= Marquee New York =

Nightclub in Manhattan

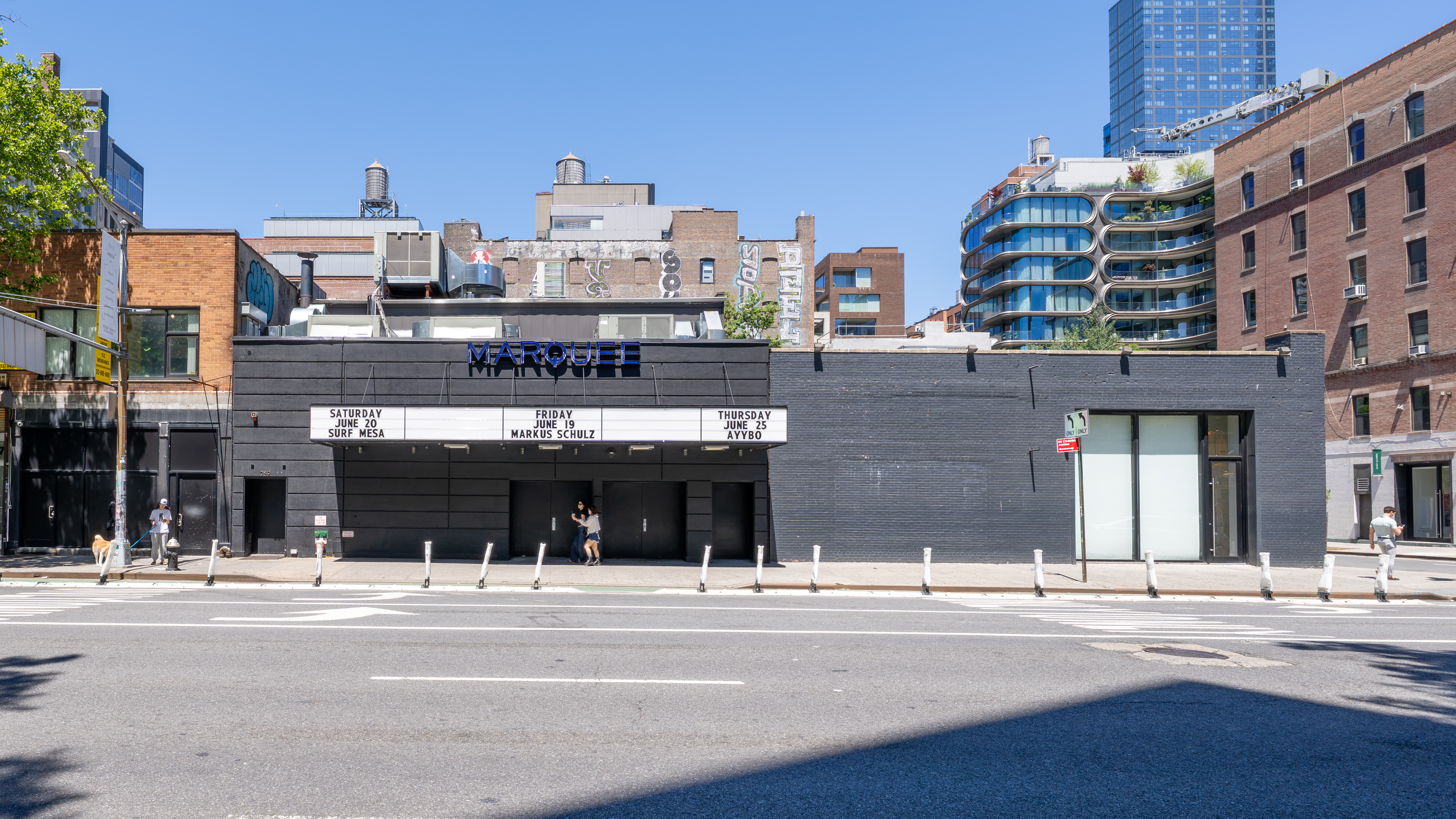
- Marquee New York in 2026
- Interactive map of Marquee New York
- Address: 289 10th Ave; New York City, NY; United States
- Coordinates: 40.75011°N 74.00282°W
- Operator: Tao Group Hospitality
- Type: Nightclub

Construction
- Opened: 2003
- Renovated: 2013, 2025

Website
- taogroup.com/venues/marquee-new-york/

Marquee New York is a nightclub located in Manhattan's Chelsea neighborhood. Established in December 2003, it has been owned and operated by Jason Strauss and Noah Tepperberg since its opening, initially under marketing and events firm Strategic Group and since 2009 under Tao Group Hospitality.

== History ==
=== Original incarnation ===
Strauss and Tepperberg had been previously handling events for Fortune 500 brands through their company Strategic Group and promoting parties to college students, and had been working with Tao Asian Bistro co-founder Marc Packer to host events at Tao since 2002. The project for Strauss and Tepperberg to start their own big nightclub after the success of their first nightlife project in New York City, Suite 16, gained $2 million invested, with Packer leading. The two Strategic Group founders would find a parking and garbage truck repair facility in Chelsea, Manhattan, where they would build their club. Tepperberg, in an interview with The Wall Street Journal, originally commented that the club would be named "Two Rooms" or "10th Avenue Club", but since the building had a marquee structure on the outside, that the club would be named Marquee.

Marquee New York opened for the first time on December 10, 2003, and quickly became known as a place frequented by celebrities. During its first New Year's Eve, the club hosted Donatella Versace and Lindsay Lohan. The New York Times would report by the club's second anniversary, Marquee would host DJ sets from Mariah Carey and Glenn Close. In its first year, Marquee New York would report revenues of $9.3 million, and surpass that in its second year with revenues of $10.8 million. Tepperberg expressed that he aimed for a 60% to 70% margin though would later dismiss his ideas as "too optimistic". By 2007, Marquee would be described by New York as being the cause of why several lanes of traffic were blocked on 10th Avenue since its first year, where Marquee is located, attributing a vast majority of cars with the club as its destination.

In 2008, Marquee was studied by Harvard Business School economist Anita Elberse, who published the case study "Marquee: The Business of Nightlife". In it, Elberse concluded that Marquee's bottle service in particular was the reason for its revenues.

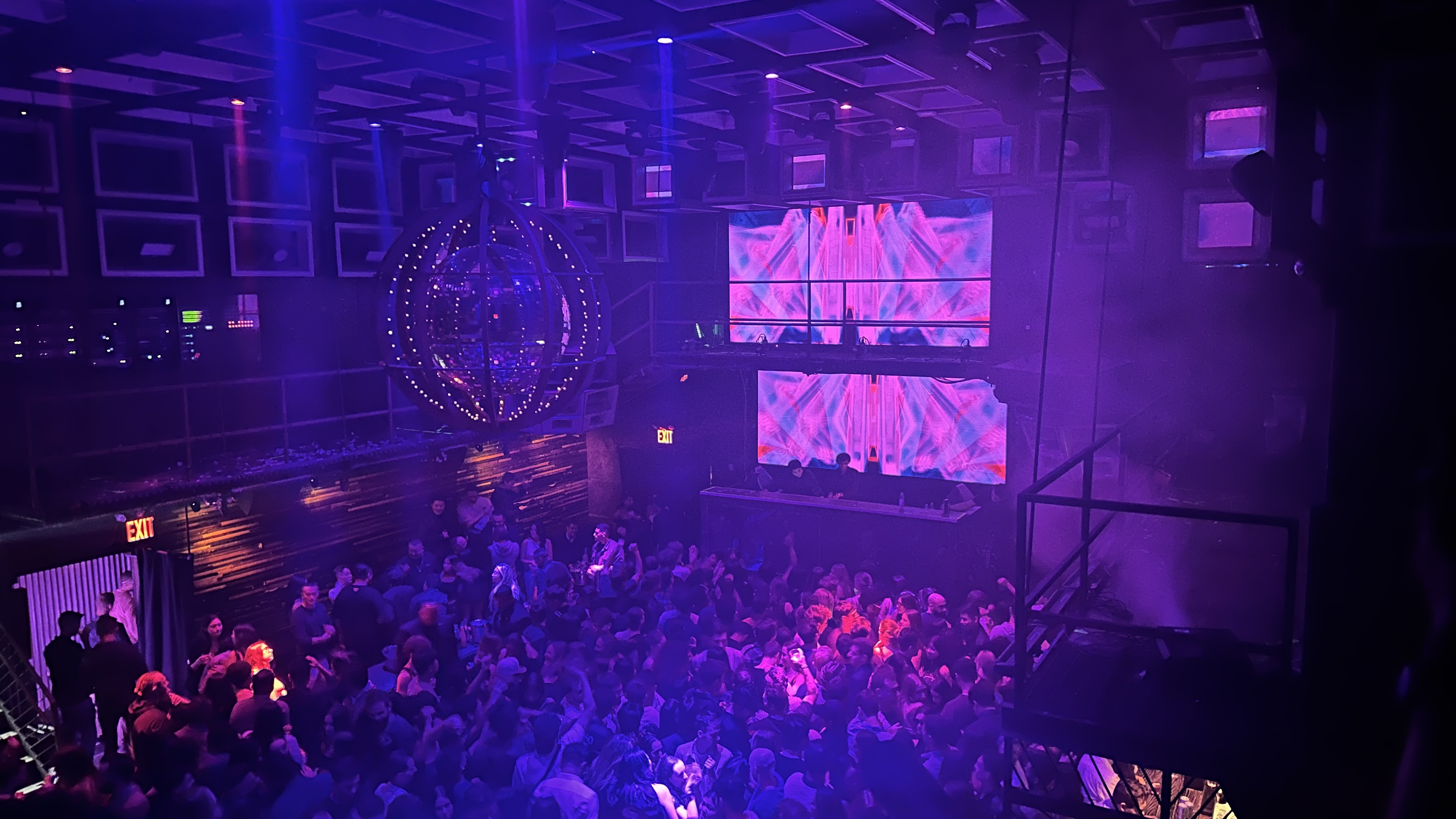
Marquee New York in November 2024

=== Second incarnation ===
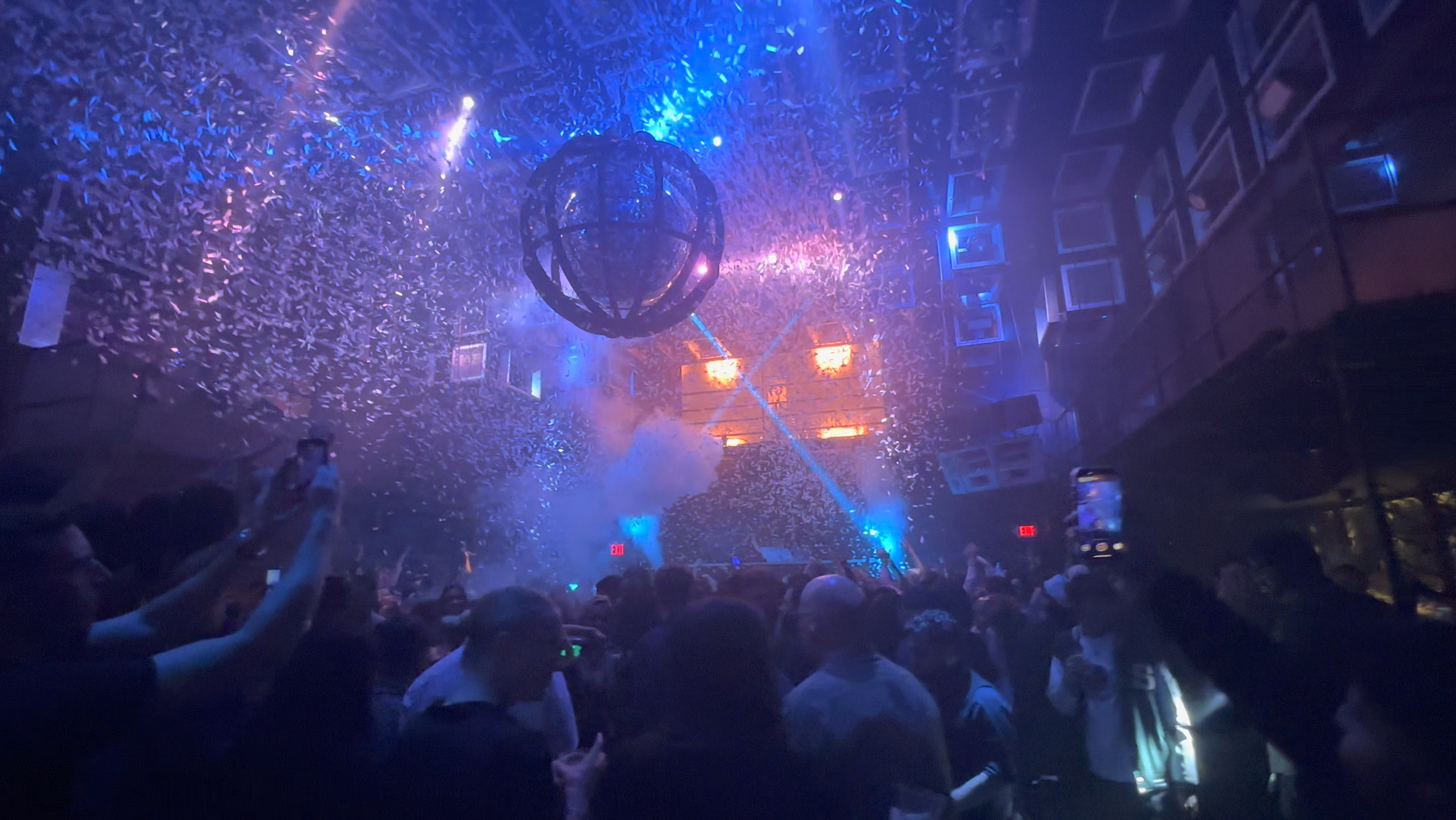
Marquee New York's second incarnation in 2025

By 2010, Strauss and Tepperberg had opened the Las Vegas location of Marquee Nightclub and Dayclub at The Cosmopolitan of Las Vegas, and had operated Tao Asian Bistro's Las Vegas restaurant and nightclub as partners with Packer and Tao co-founder Rich Wolf since 2005. Tepperberg renewed the lease for Marquee New York around the same time that Tao Group expanded Marquee to The Star casino in Sydney. In renovating Marquee New York, however, Tepperberg commented to The Wall Street Journal that he wanted to redo the entire interior, not just "change the wallpaper".

The overall redesign of Marquee New York would be led by Josh Held, who also designed multiple hotels for W Hotels. Marquee New York's second iteration would raise the ceiling by 15 feet (4.6 m), with the entire club feeling like a three-story building. The club would also add a trapeze rig, twelve costumed performers per night, a makeup room, and a 20 feet (6.1 m) LED wall with a dedicated video jockey. Marquee also expanded its dance floor, removing some tables. The club would further decorate Marquee as having an industrial feel, using old leather belts as some of its wall decorations. The overall design philosophy of the New York club resembled a miniature compressed version of Marquee's Las Vegas location, and Marquee New York would no longer resemble a chic club but have a more stadium-like design.

The first event at the renovated Marquee would be a private party celebrating the wrap party of the Martin Scorsese film The Wolf of Wall Street.

=== Third incarnation ===
In April 2025, Marquee New York announced it would be closing between then and September to renovate the interiors, while moving its summer events to the 112th floor observation deck at 30 Hudson Yards. Tao would onboard architect Jack Hotho as the primary designer behind the renovation. Branded as "Marquee New York 3.0" by Tao Group Hospitality, the club would reopen to the general public for the first time on September 25, 2025, with Diplo as the headliner. Steve Aoki, Kaskade, Oliver Heldens, Elderbrook, and Chris Lorenzo also scheduled shows to be performed at Marquee post-renovation.

== Venue design ==
Since 2025, Marquee New York 3.0 utilized a design language layering a rich purple tone over dark oak. The dance floor was expanded and the ceilings were covered with LED panels.

== Incidents ==
In 2008, Marquee was shuttered after cops made seven undercover buys of cocaine and illegal narcotics inside.

Marquee has been the site of multiple sexual abuse incidents. In December 2008, a woman from Brooklyn vanished after leaving the club with a convicted sex offender. A guest at Marquee was alleged of committing rape at the club in 2009, alongside kidnapping and sexual abuse charges.

In 2014, Marquee New York was the last reported location of costume designer Michele Savoia, before he went missing and was later found dead in the Hudson River. Savoia's death would later be attributed to him slipping into the river after attempting to board a boat.

== Marquee Skydeck ==
During the 2025 renovation of Marquee New York, Tao Group Hospitality moved events to the 112th floor of 30 Hudson Yards, which during the day is branded as "Edge at Hudson Yards". Marquee's takeover of The Edge was named the Marquee Skydeck, and the club remains the highest outdoor nightclub in the Western Hemisphere at 1,131 feet (345 m) high.

== Notable performers ==
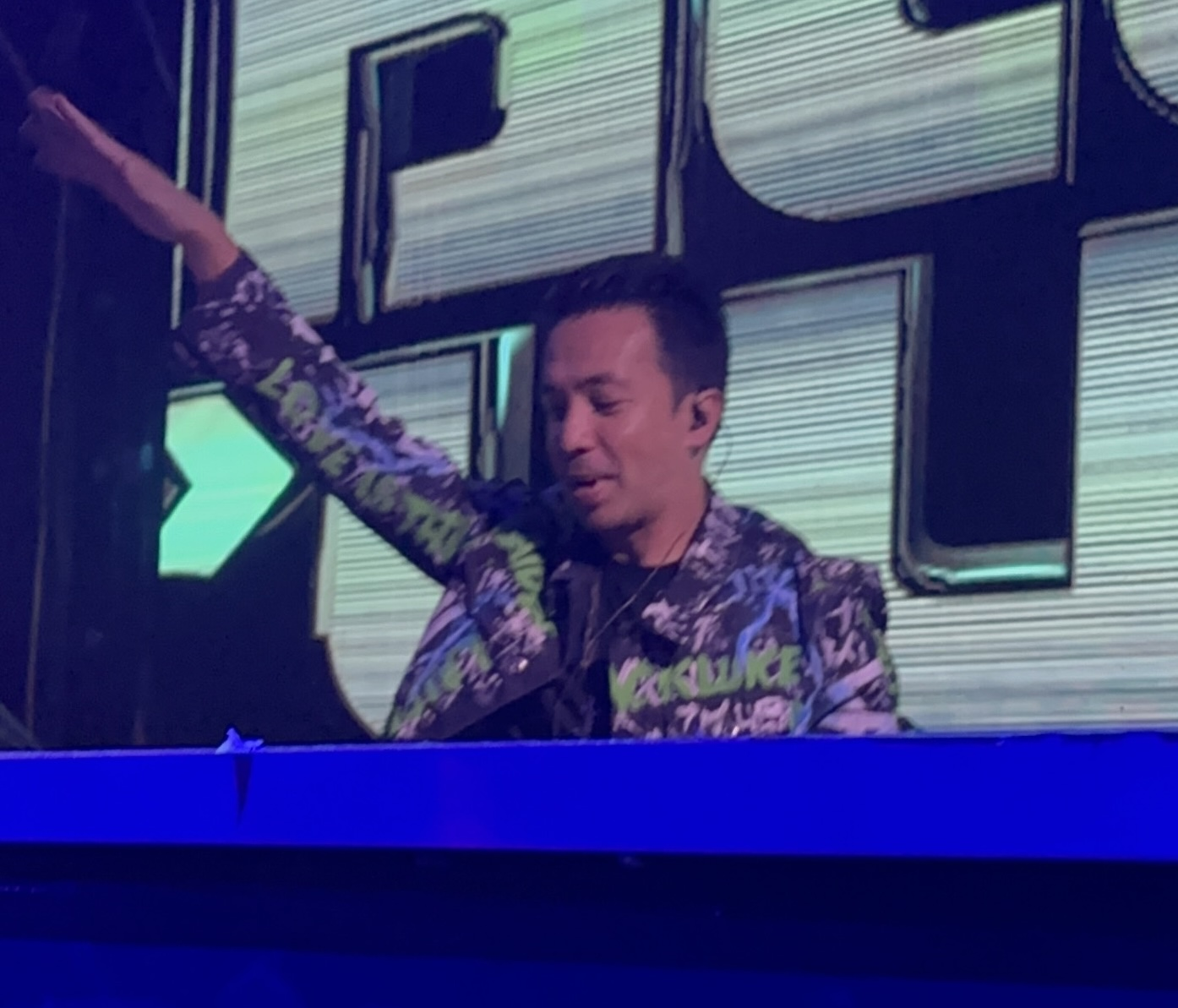
Laidback Luke playing at Marquee New York in 2024

- Afrojack
- Alan Walker
- Chris Lorenzo
- Claptone
- Dimitri Vegas
- Diplo
- Fisher
- Elderbrook
- Kaskade
- Kshmr
- Laidback Luke
- Oliver Heldens
- Robin Schulz
- Rune Reilly Kölsch
- Steve Aoki
- Zedd
