= Marquee nightclub =

Marquee nightclub may refer to:

- Marquee Club, a former music club in London
- Marquee New York, a nightclub in Manhattan
