= Tao Asian Bistro =

Asian fusion restaurant and nightclub chain

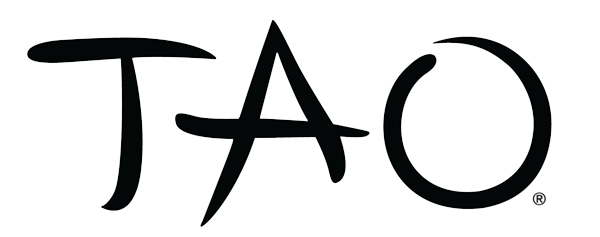

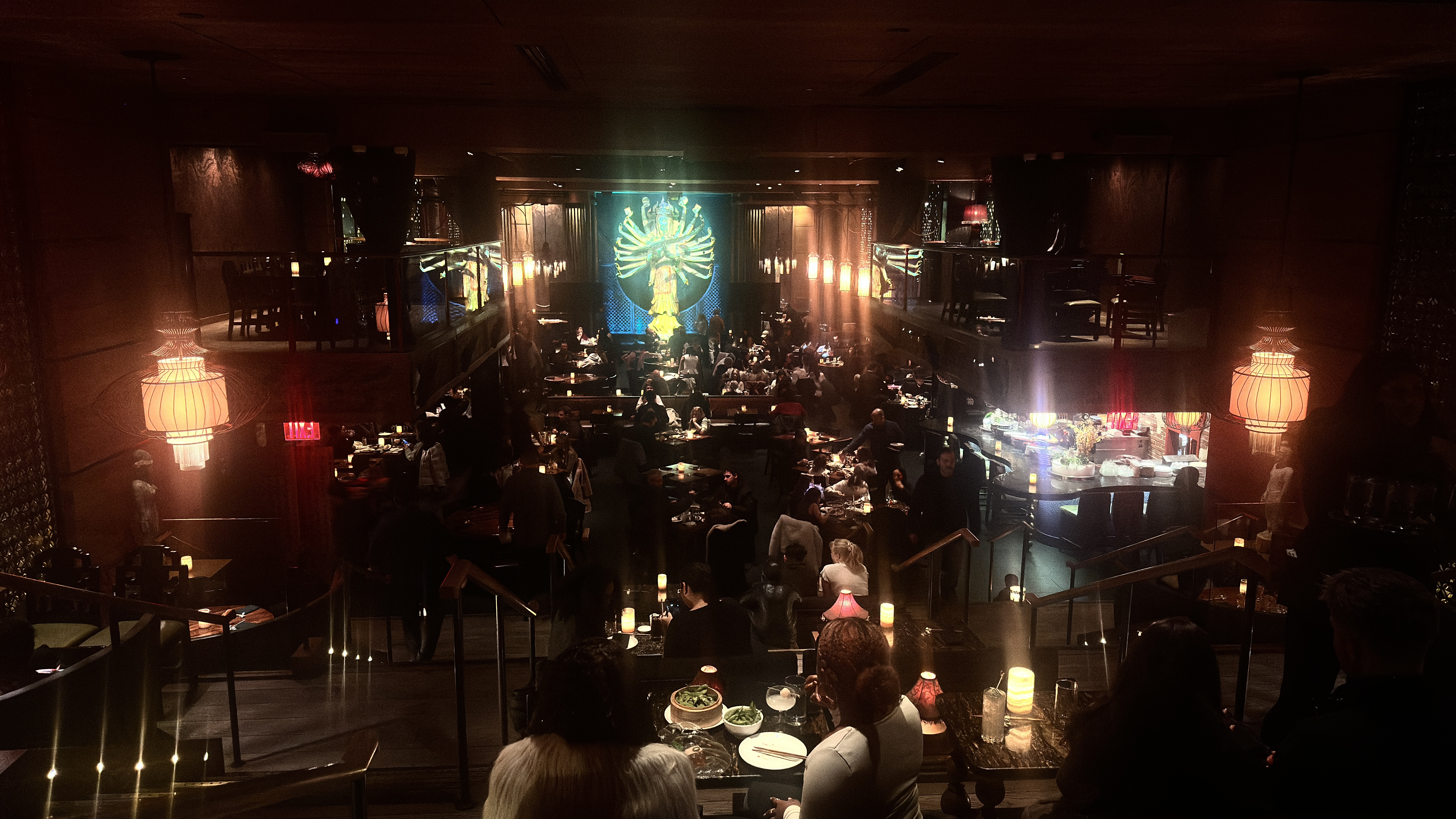
- Tao Downtown in Chelsea, Manhattan

Restaurant information
- Established: 2000
- Owners: Mohari Hospitality; Rich Wolf; Marc Packer; Jason Strauss; Noah Tepperberg
- Food type: Asian Fusion
- Location: New York City, Las Vegas, Los Angeles, Chicago, Mohegan Sun
- Website: taogroup.com

Tao Asian Bistro is an Asian fusion (Note: According to a promotional blurb from the Venetian Resort, where Tao's Las Vegas location is based out of, the restaurant fuses Thai, Chinese, and Japanese cuisines) restaurant and nightclub chain founded in New York City in 2000. The flagship brand of Tao Group Hospitality, in addition to two locations in New York, Tao further operates one location each in Los Angeles, Chicago, Las Vegas, and the Mohegan Sun resort, with the locations in Chicago, Manhattan's Chelsea district and The Venetian in Las Vegas containing adjacent nightclubs. Furthermore, the Vegas location further houses the dayclub Tao Beach.

The idea of Marc Packer and Rich Wolf, Tao gained early recognition for its decorations, including large buddha statues, and its partnership with Jason Strauss and Noah Tepperberg, the owners of a marketing firm and the New York City nightclub Marquee. The original location was followed by the opening of Tao Las Vegas in 2005, which by 2007 became the highest-grossing independent restaurant in America, earning approximately $60 million in revenue in 2011. Tao is viewed as one of the earliest modern examples of a restaurant-nightclub hybrid, or clubstaurant.

The success of Tao led the four founders eventually restructuring their ventures into Tao Group Hospitality by 2009, presently a subsidiary of PokerStars founder Mark Scheinberg's investment firm Mohari Hospitality and formerly owned by James L. Dolan through Madison Square Garden Entertainment. Tao has garnered attention for its high revenue figures, celebrity clientele, and its Las Vegas location's unique ability to attract both conventional diners and club-goers, though has faced criticism for its use of Buddha imagery and for advertising practices perceived as culturally insensitive.

== History ==
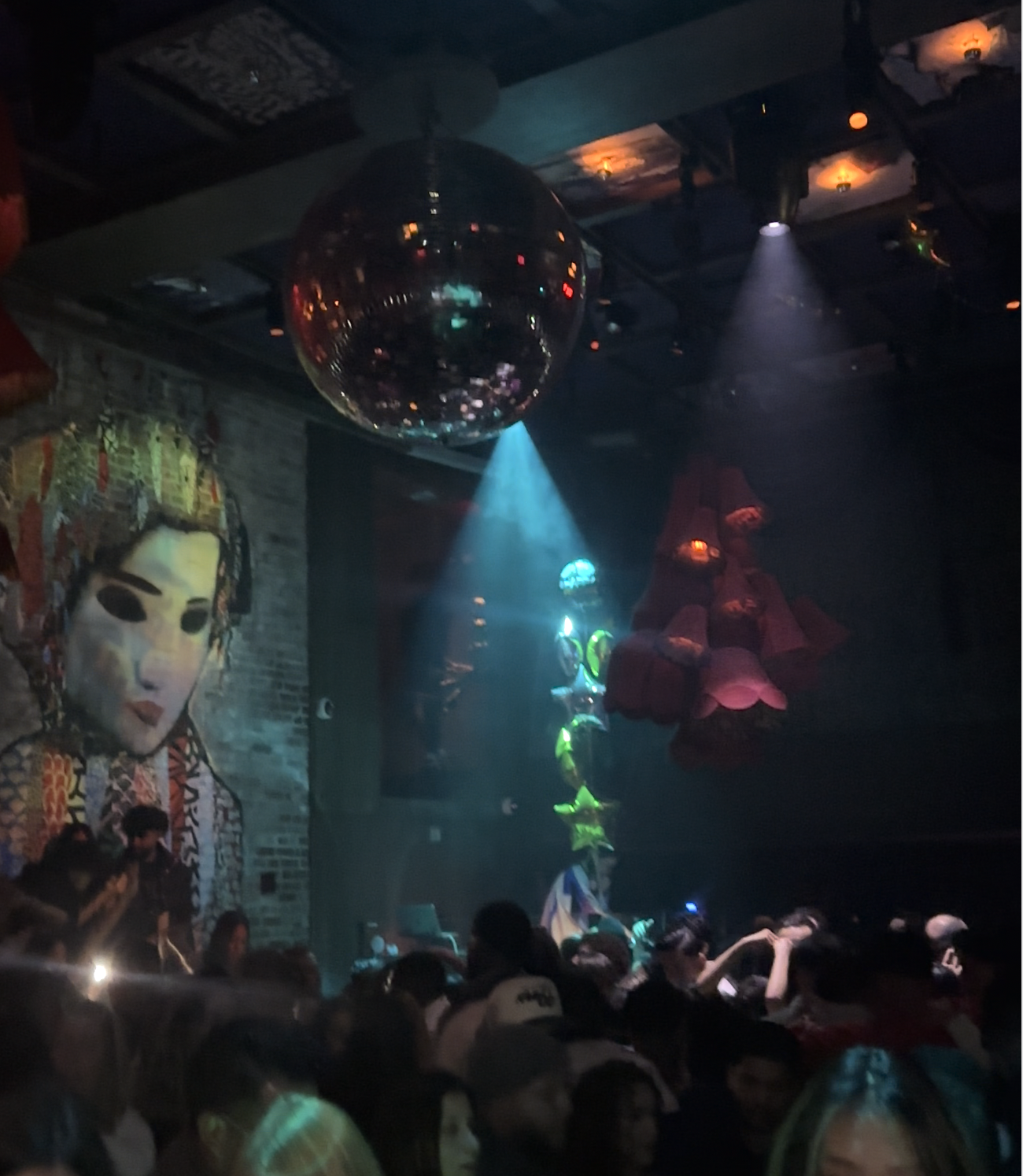
Tao Downtown's nightclub in New York City

Tao was founded in 2000 by Marc Packer and Rich Wolf at the site of a former coach house used by the Vanderbilt family. The original location, today known as Tao Uptown after a second New York restaurant opened in 2013, partnered extensively with Strategic Group, an event marketing firm and owners of the Chelsea nightclub Marquee owned and operated by Jason Strauss and Noah Tepperberg. Wolf in particular made a noted effort to populate Tao with buddha statues, including a large 12-foot tall and 9,000 pound center statue of the buddha sitting which sits at the center of Tao Uptown. In one of the earliest reviews of the restaurant, The New York Times noted Tao in January 2001 as "not so much a restaurant as a nonstop party interrupted by funny food".

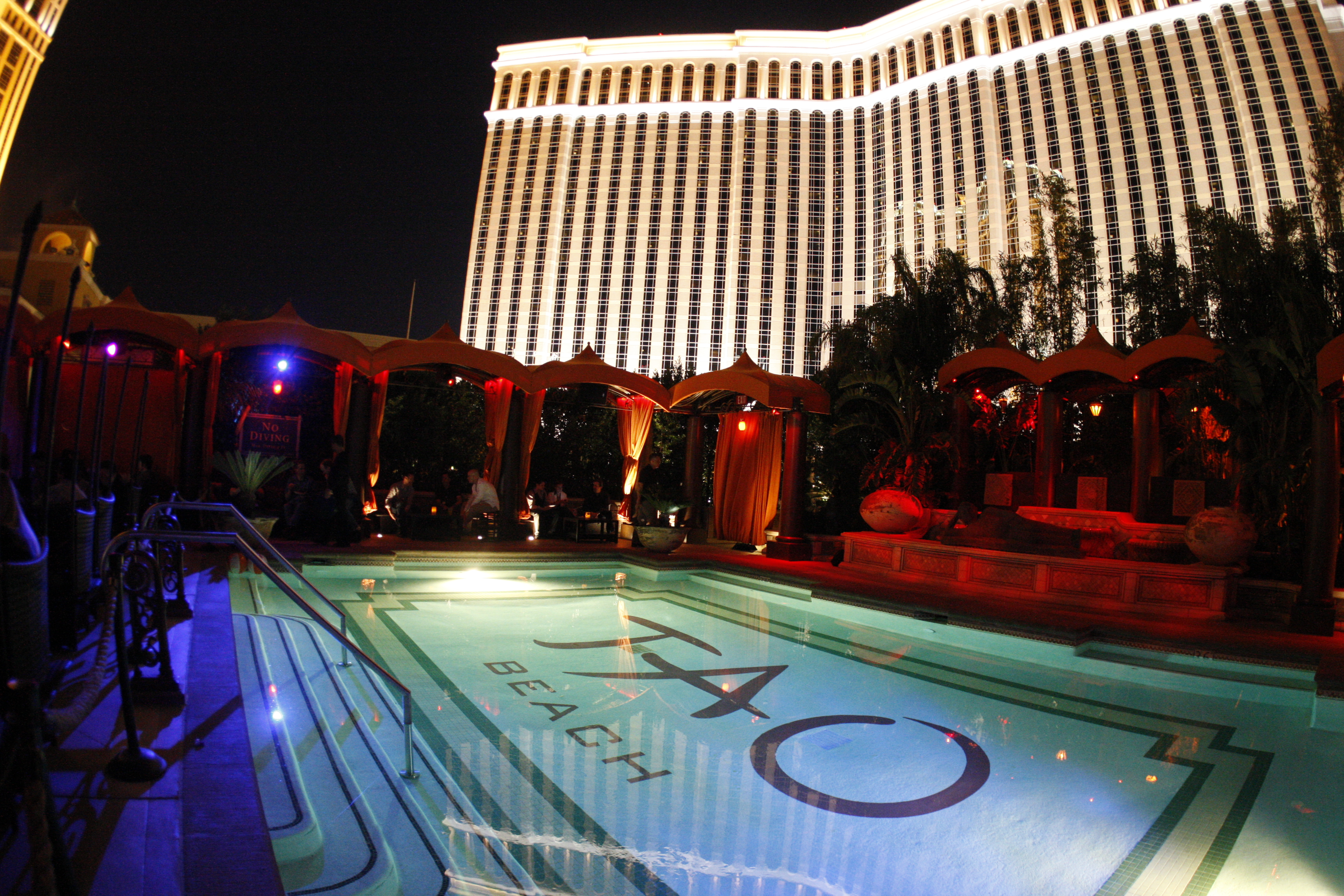
Tao Beach in 2009

Packer, Strauss, Tepperberg, and Wolf later decided to open a Las Vegas location for Tao based on the success of both Tao and Marquee. Bringing in a fifth partner, Lou Abin, who would later go on to found the Bua Group, Tao's Las Vegas location opened in 2005, and by 2011, that location became the highest-grossing independent restaurant in the United States by revenue, earning around $60 million that year. Tao's downtown New York location, which opened near the Chelsea Market in 2013 and features an adjacent nightclub, ranked at third place in 2017. In 2007, the group opened Tao Beach, a daytime pool party on the roof of both the nightclub and the restaurant, and in 2010, Tao Beach was used to film the music video for LMFAO's single "Shots". Tao Beach underwent a major renovation in 2020, coincidentally the year of the COVID-19 pandemic, and reopened in 2022.

In 2013, Tao opened a second location in the Chelsea neighborhood, referred to as Tao Downtown, after Packer and Wolf beat out multiple competitors to take over the Hiro Ballroom and Matsuri restaurant spaces at the Maritime Hotel, today rebranded as the Dream Downtown hotel. Designed by David Rockwell, Tao Downtown per a 2017 Bloomberg article seats about 1,200 customers every night, and per 2016 figures in Restaurant Week, Tao Downtown is the highest-grossing non-chain restaurant in New York City and third highest in the world with $34 million in sales, only trailing Tao Las Vegas' $47.9 million and Joe's Stone Crab in Miami at $38 million.

2017 was also a year where Tao opened a bistro in Hollywood, Los Angeles, located next to the Dream Hotel. Tao also opened a bistro and nightclub in Chicago that year in the city's River North district, at the Former Chicago Historical Society Building, itself the previous home of many defunct nightclubs. Tao's most recent new location opened at Connecticut's Mohegan Sun resort, in 2021.

In 2024, a former employee of the group who was terminated in December 2022 entered Tao Downtown wearing a disguise and dumped fecal matter into the koi pond, and subsequently protesting the company by yelling at diners. According to the company, which filed a criminal complaint against the former employee, after her termination, she had engaged in various activities which included harassing other employees and threatening to burn down the group's venues. Tao claimed that the former employee caused $3,000 in damages and sought to ban her 50 yards from all of their property.

== Present locations ==
Tao presently has two locations in Manhattan. The original, today referred to as Tao Uptown, is located on 58th Street between Madison Avenue and Park Avenue, while the newer Tao Downtown is located at the intersection of 16th Street and Ninth Avenue adjacent to the former Maritime Hotel, today the Dream Downtown. Tao Downtown also houses a nightclub inside of it. The only other Tao location in the Northeastern United States is at the Mohegan Sun casino resort in Connecticut.

Tao additionally has locations in Chicago's River North district, where it also features a nightclub, and a restaurant-only location in Hollywood, Los Angeles. Tao's restaurant and nightclub in Las Vegas is located within The Venetian, and is the only Tao location to also feature a day club named Tao Beach.

=== Tao Beach ===
Tao Beach

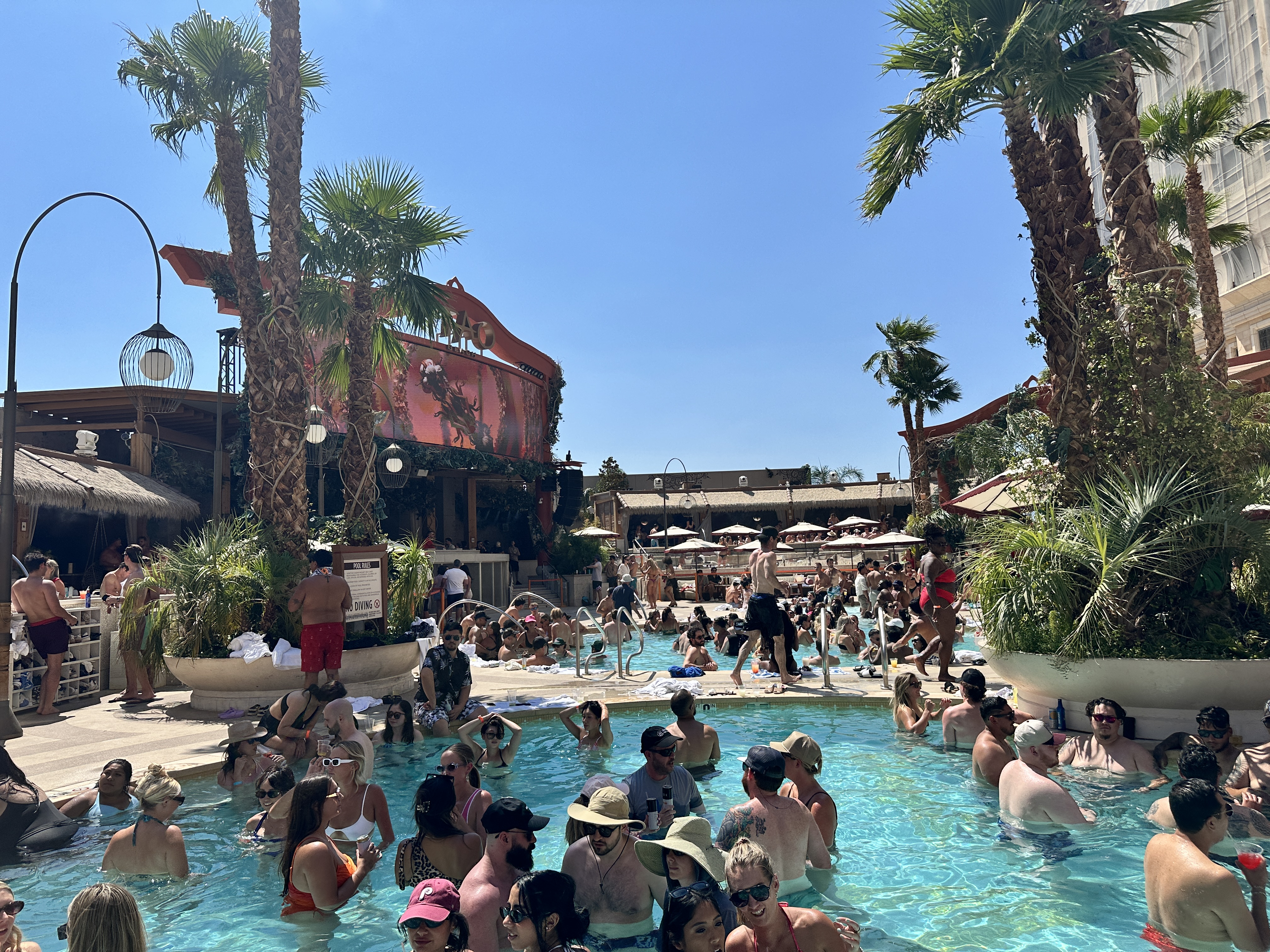
- Tao Beach in 2025

General information
- Location: 3355 Las Vegas Blvd; Las Vegas, Nevada, 89109, United States
- Opened: 2007

Other information
- Number of bars: 5

Website
- taogroup.com

Tao Beach is a dayclub located on the roof of the Venetian hotel, directly above and connected to Tao's restaurant and nightclub. Tao Beach is widely considered to be one of the two first true "dayclubs" in the context of its modern form of the venue category alongside Bare Pool Lounge at The Mirage, and was the first in Las Vegas to operate daily throughout its season. The original version of Tao Beach lasted from 2007 to 2020, when it was moved to a new part of the Venetian and renovated into a much larger venue, reopening in 2022. This first version of Tao Beach became known for being the location of where LMFAO filmed the music video for their 2009 single "Shots".

Tao Beach's renovation cost US$50 million, and the new venue, at 44,000 square feet and a capacity of 3,000 people, became one of the largest dayclubs in Las Vegas. The new Tao Beach, themed around the island of Bali, holds five bars and 29 cabanas. In November 2024 during Tao Beach's offseason, the roller skating company Flipper's World temporarily opened a rink to operate during the winter months open from noon to 8pm. The venue is often noted by magazines, just like the rest of the Tao brand, to be a celebrity magnet, with Maxim calling it a festival-like experience and Dancing Astronaut deeming it a much more intimate experience, especially those not buying a VIP table and in comparison to the much larger Encore Beach Club.

== Ownership ==
Tao's founders, Marc Packer and Rich Wolf, brought onboard Jason Strauss and Noah Tepperberg, the two founders of Strategic Group and owners of the nightclub Marquee New York who had been partnering with Tao frequently, to open Tao Las Vegas as a joint venture between all of them. In 2009, the four would officially restructure their venture into Tao Group Hospitality, and by 2017, Madison Square Garden Entertainment would acquire a 62.5% stake in the company for $181 million. MSGE would later sell off this stake to PokerStars founder Mark Scheinberg via his hospitality investment fund Mohari Hospitality in 2023 for US$550 million in order to fund MSGE's construction of the Sphere in Las Vegas.

== Revenue and reception ==
According to The Atlantic, Tao's Las Vegas location is not just the highest grossing restaurant in America, but per 2011 figures, also its most profitable, and that it is able to keep much of its revenue by marketing to more conventional demographics during the week juxtaposed by populations keen on clubbing during the weekends, assisted by the nature of visiting Las Vegas revolves much more around spending than other destinations; both demographics do not see the other party at Tao Las Vegas. Tao Las Vegas had been the highest grossing restaurant in the United States since 2007, and for three years straight between then and 2009. Furthermore, in 2016, Tao Las Vegas alone made $42.4 million in revenue according to the magazine Restaurant Business, though that figure is a decline from 2015, where Tao Las Vegas' revenue was $47.9 million. Tao is often regarded as a place for celebrity sightings in New York, with Billboard noting that various celebrities including Beyoncé, Jay-Z, Chance the Rapper, and Afrojack being spotted at both the Downtown and Uptown locations. Furthermore, Tao Uptown was used for an episode of Sex and the City for a fictional restaurant's opening.

Conversely, the mini-chain has been strongly criticized though for the inclusion of a Buddha statue inside of most of its restaurants, and for "exoticizing" Asian cuisines. One example of the restaurant's advertising practices being perceived as racist by locals was when the club ran a billboard outside of Los Angeles International Airport in 2014, featuring a naked woman's back with the text "Always a Happy Ending", a reference to an erotic massage. Tao Downtown has also been noted as one of the loudest restaurants in New York, and in testing the conversation boosting features in Apple's AirPods Pro, The New York Times used Tao Downtown as their testing ground.

== Gallery ==
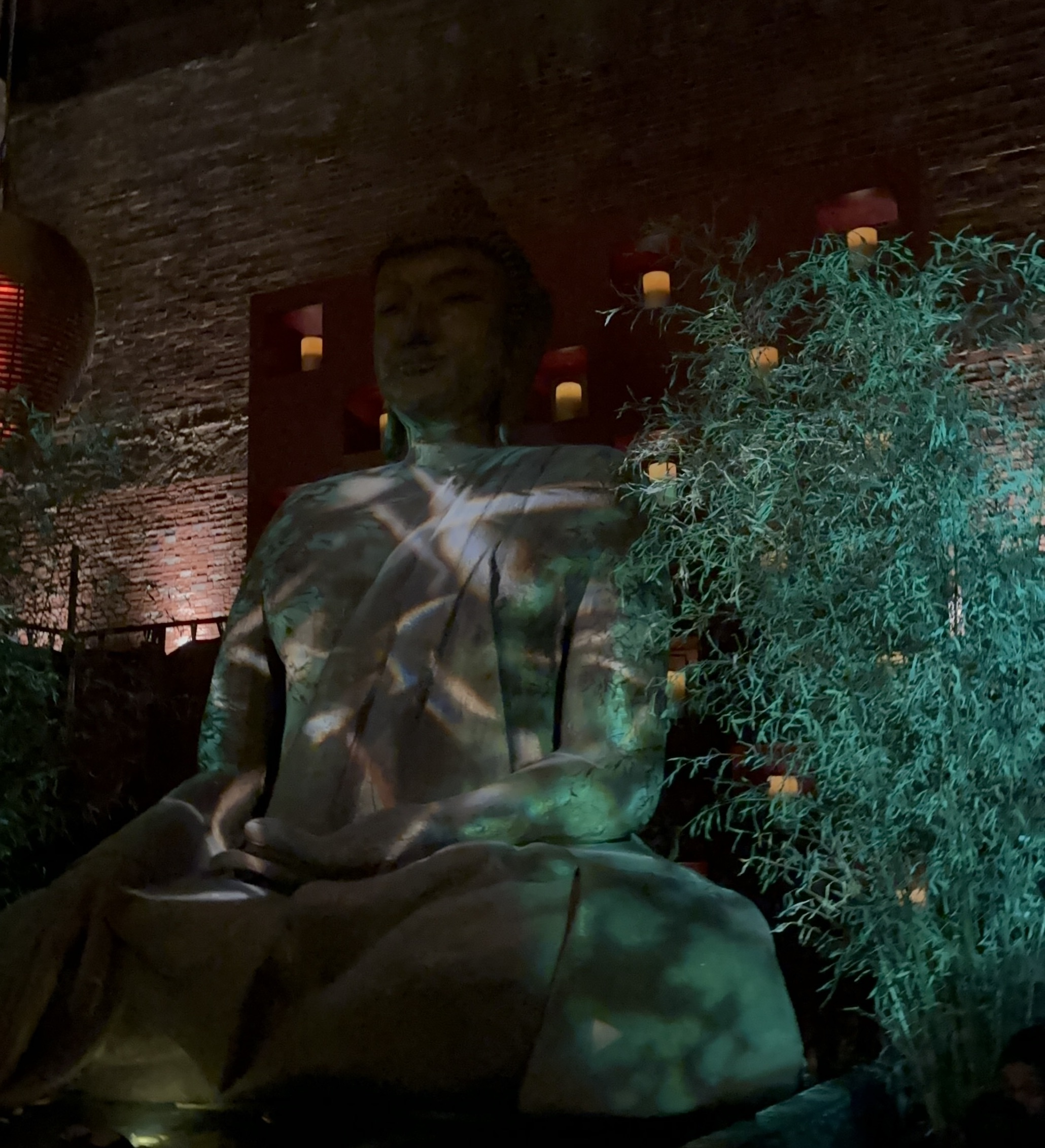
The Buddha statue at Tao Uptown

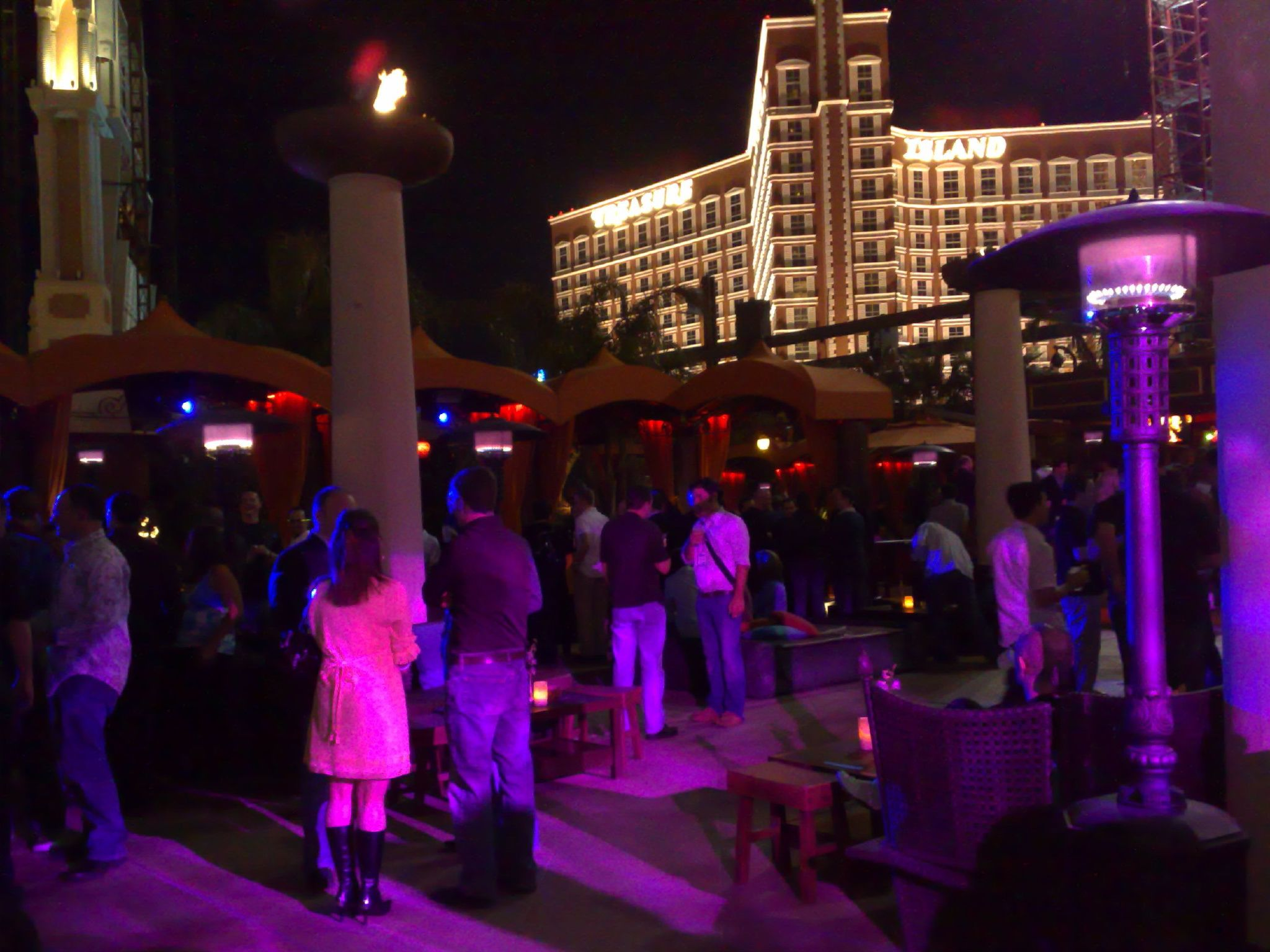
Tao Beach at night

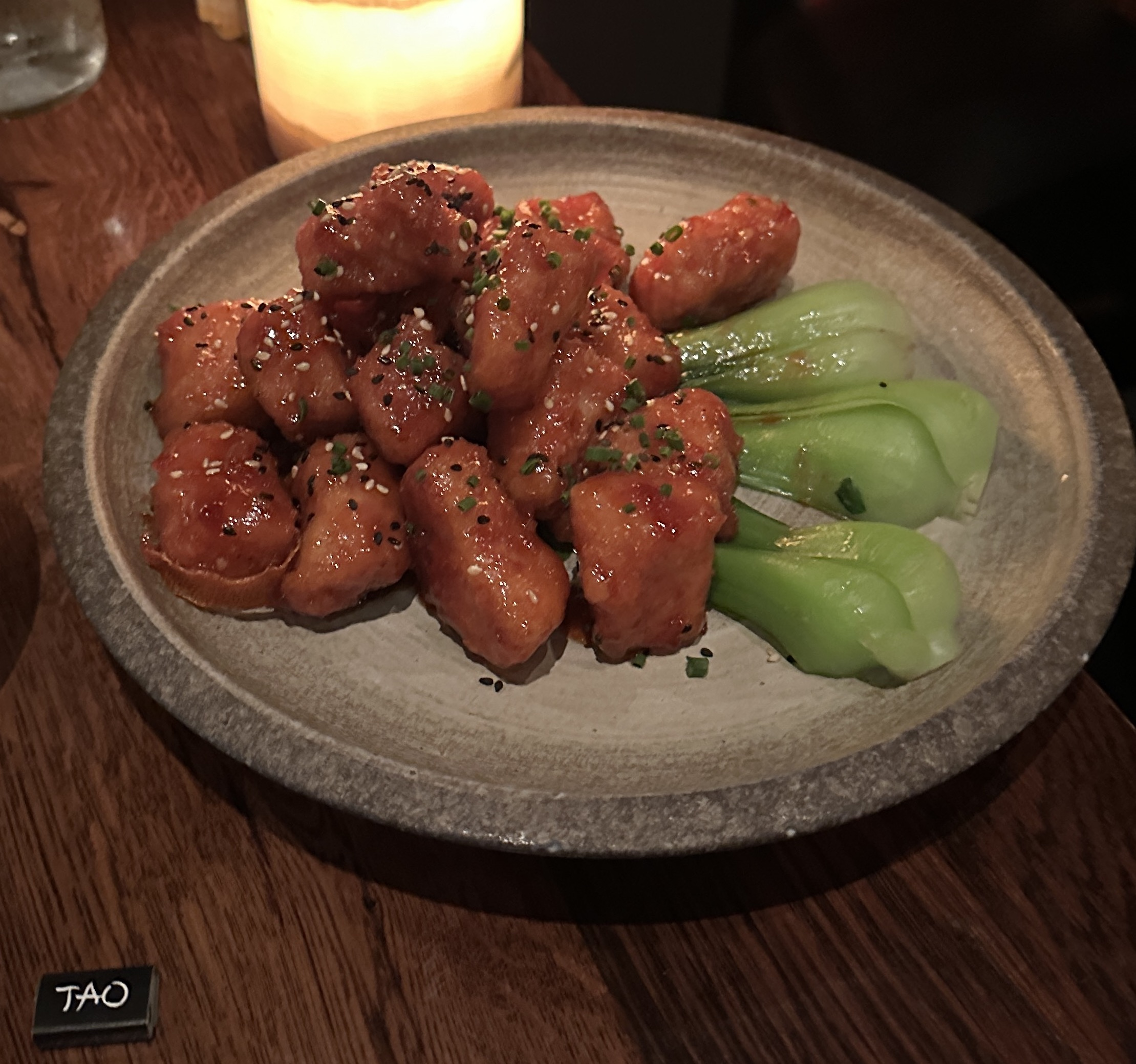
Tao's orange chicken dish

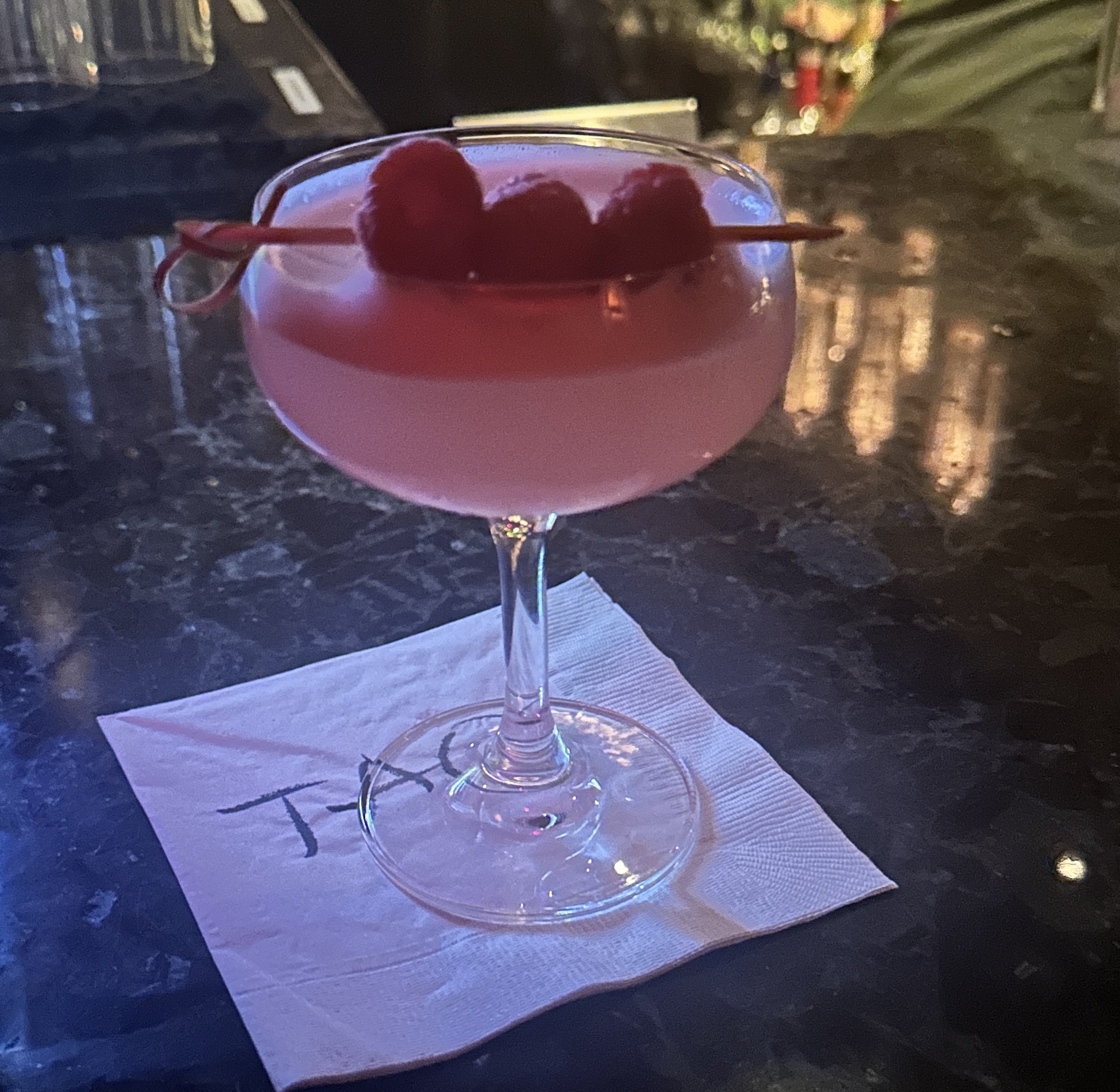
A "Tao-tini", one of the restaurant's cocktails

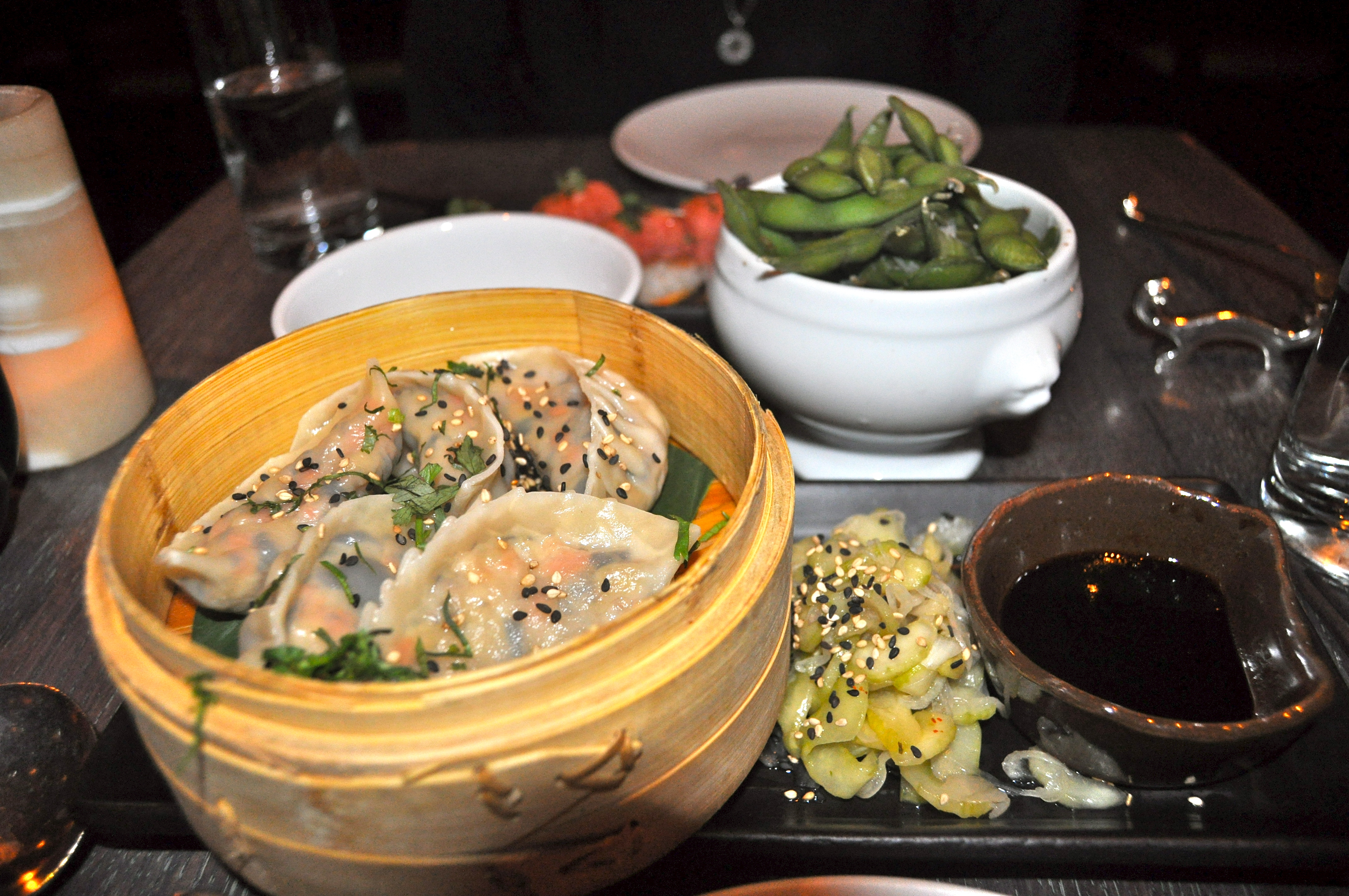
Dumpling appetizers and snow peas at Tao Las Vegas

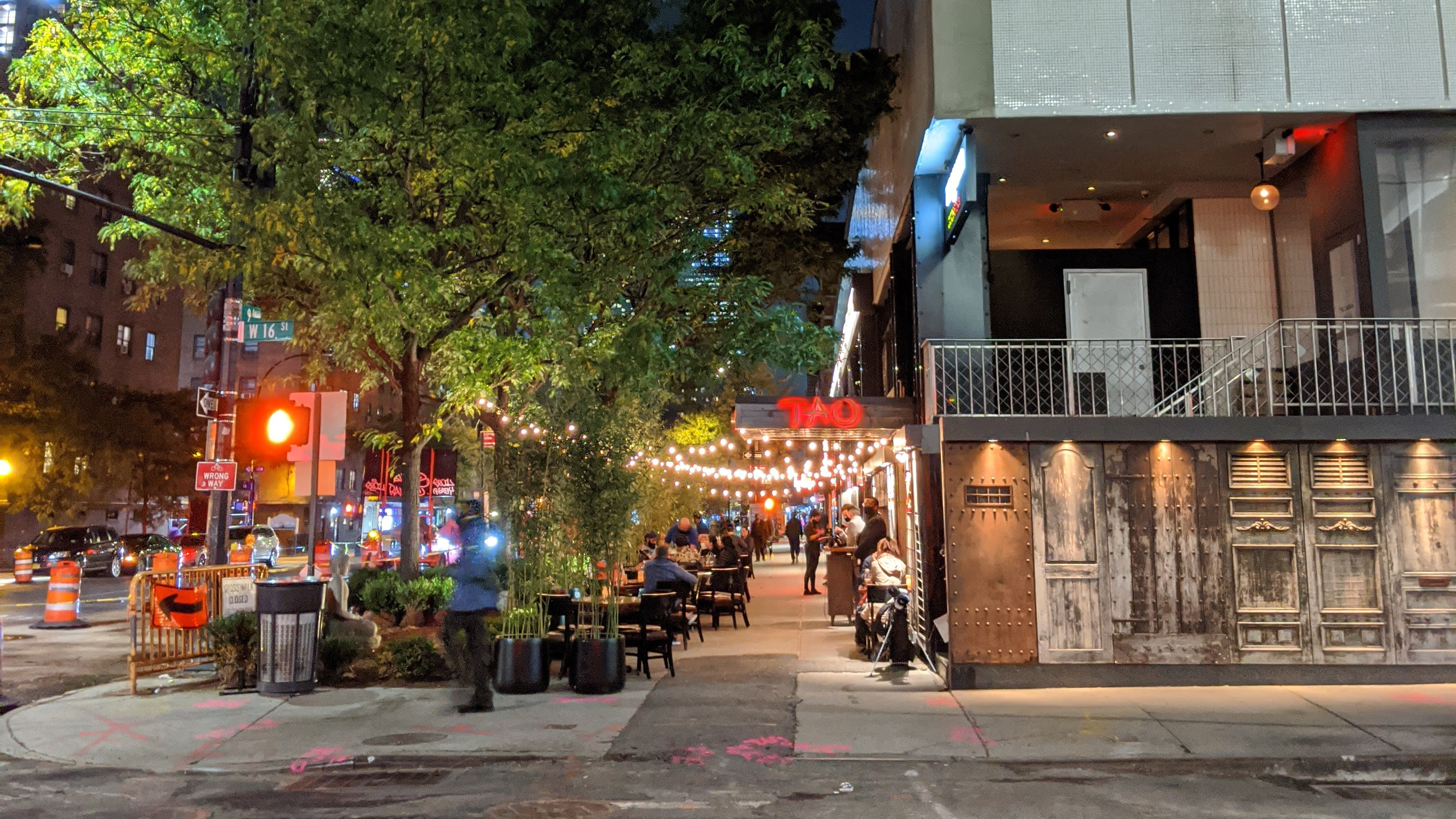
The exterior of Tao Downtown

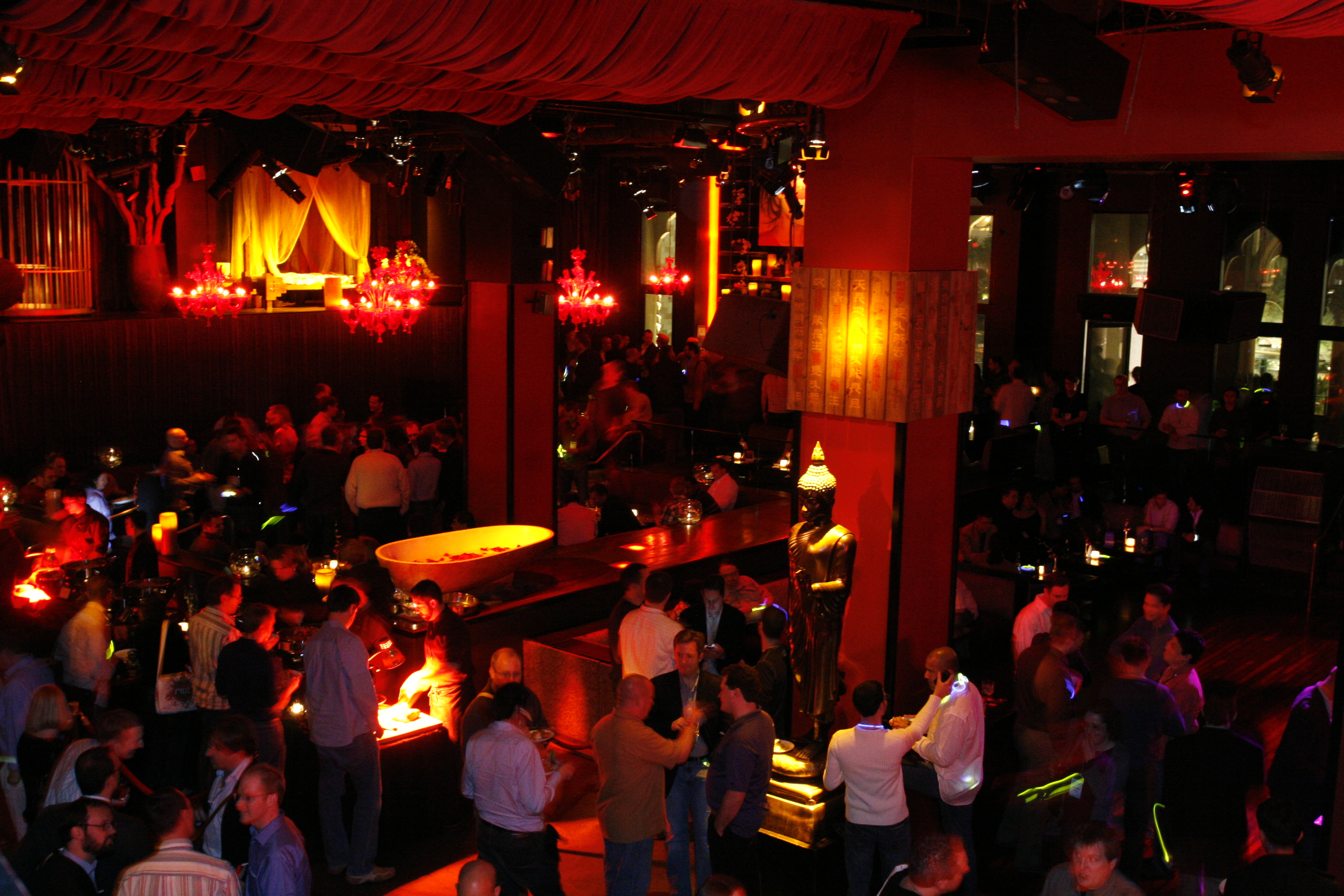
Tao Nightclub in Las Vegas

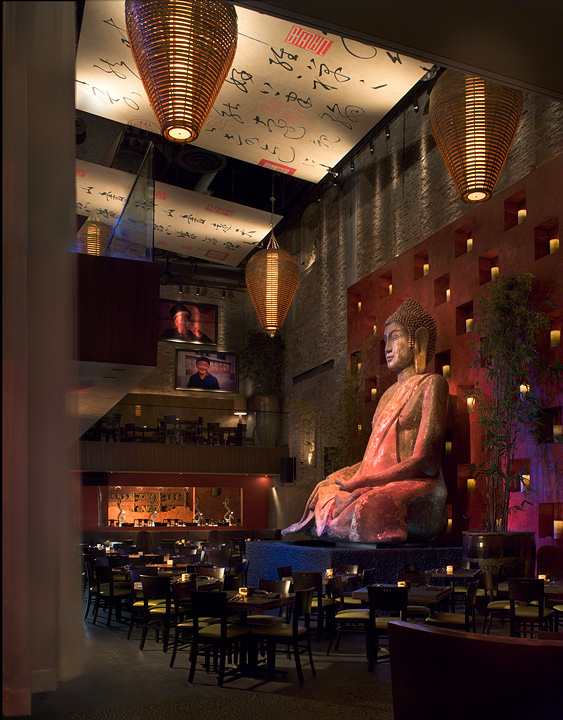
Tao Las Vegas' buddha statue

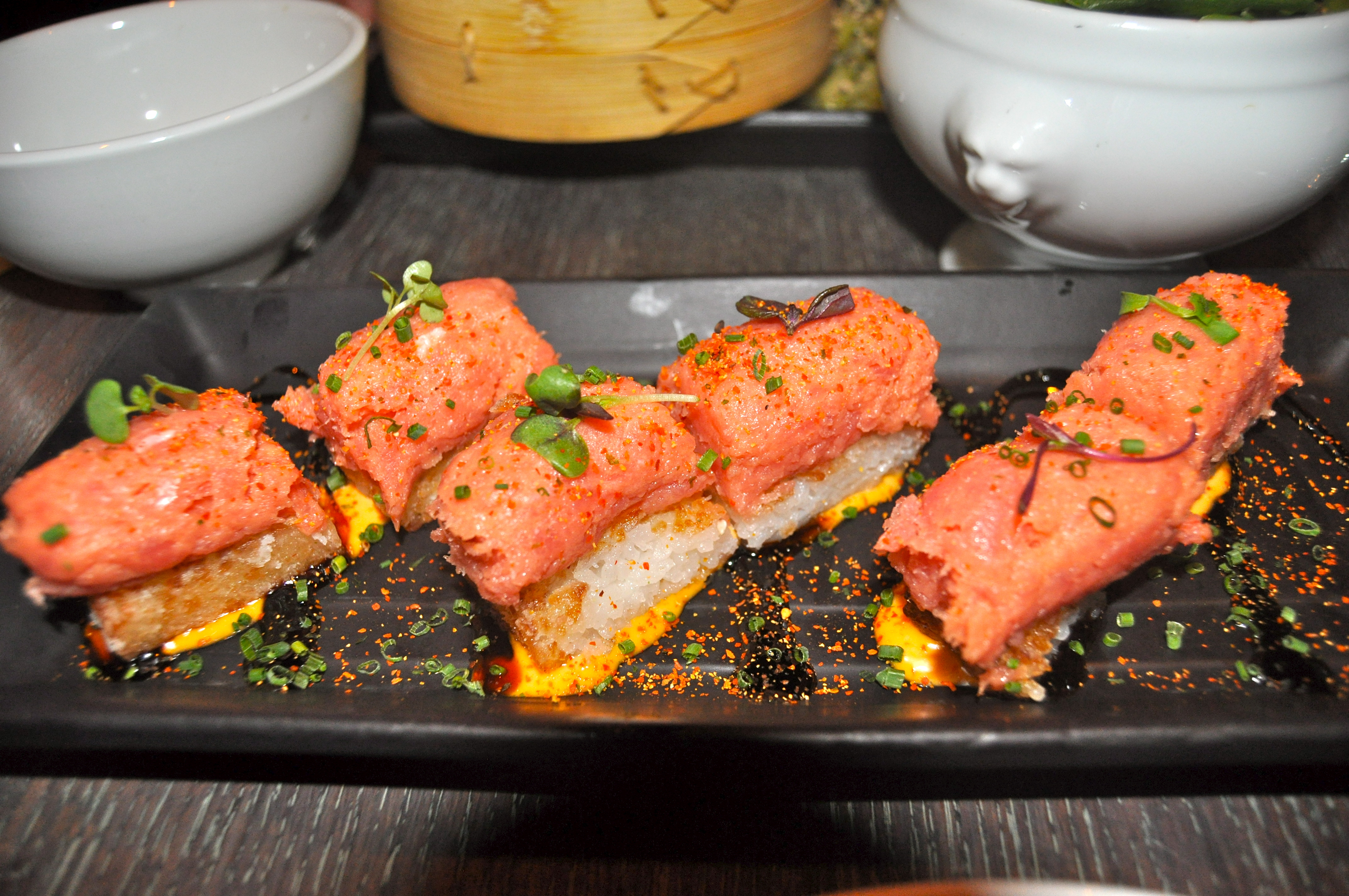
Tuna Tatare at Tao Las Vegas
