= Tao Group Hospitality =

American multinational restaurant and nightclub operator

- Type: Subsidiary
- Industry: Restaurant and nightclub
- Founded: 2009
- Founder: Rich Wolf; Marc Packer; Jason Strauss; Noah Tepperberg
- Headquarters: New York, New York
- Number of locations: 80+
- Area served: Mexico; Singapore; United States
- Key people: Jason Strauss (Co-CEO); Noah Tepperberg (Co-CEO)
- Brands: Tao Asian Bistro
- Services: Foodservice; Nightclubs
- Owner: Mark Scheinberg (67% via Mohari Hospitality)
- Website: taogroup.com

Tao Group Hospitality is an American restaurant and nightlife conglomerate founded in 2009 and headquartered in New York City. The group, whose roots can be traced to as early as 2000, presently owns and operates restaurants, nightclubs, dayclubs, private event venues, and food delivery services under 44 brands.

Tao can trace its roots to the partnerships of Jason Strauss and Noah Tepperberg's marketing firm Strategic Group, which also owned the nightclub Marquee New York. Strategic Group often collaborated with Marc Packer and Rich Wolf's Tao Asian Bistro, often hosting events at Tao. All four were partners in Tao's first location and nightclub outside of New York City, located at The Venetian in Las Vegas, which opened in 2005, incorporating as Tao Group Hospitality officially in 2009. In 2017, Tao sold 62.5% of their business to James L. Dolan through his Madison Square Garden Entertainment corporation for $181 million, which they would later sell to PokerStars founder Mark Scheinberg's Mohari Hospitality investment firm for $550 million in 2023, though not before acquiring the Hakkasan Group in 2021 and merging it into Tao, before splitting the Hakkasan brand off in 2025 alongside Yautacha, Ling Ling, and Sake No Hana.

The group also boasts lucrative revenue figures, with Tao Asian Bistro's Las Vegas location in particular frequently ranking as the highest grossing restaurant in the United States by revenue. In addition to Tao, Marquee, and Hakkasan, the Tao Group also owns and operates the restaurants Beauty & Essex, Lavo, and Cathédrale, the nightclubs Omnia, Jewel, the Highlight Room, PHD Rooftop, and Little Sister Lounge, and the fine dining restaurant and members lounge, Crane Club.

== History ==
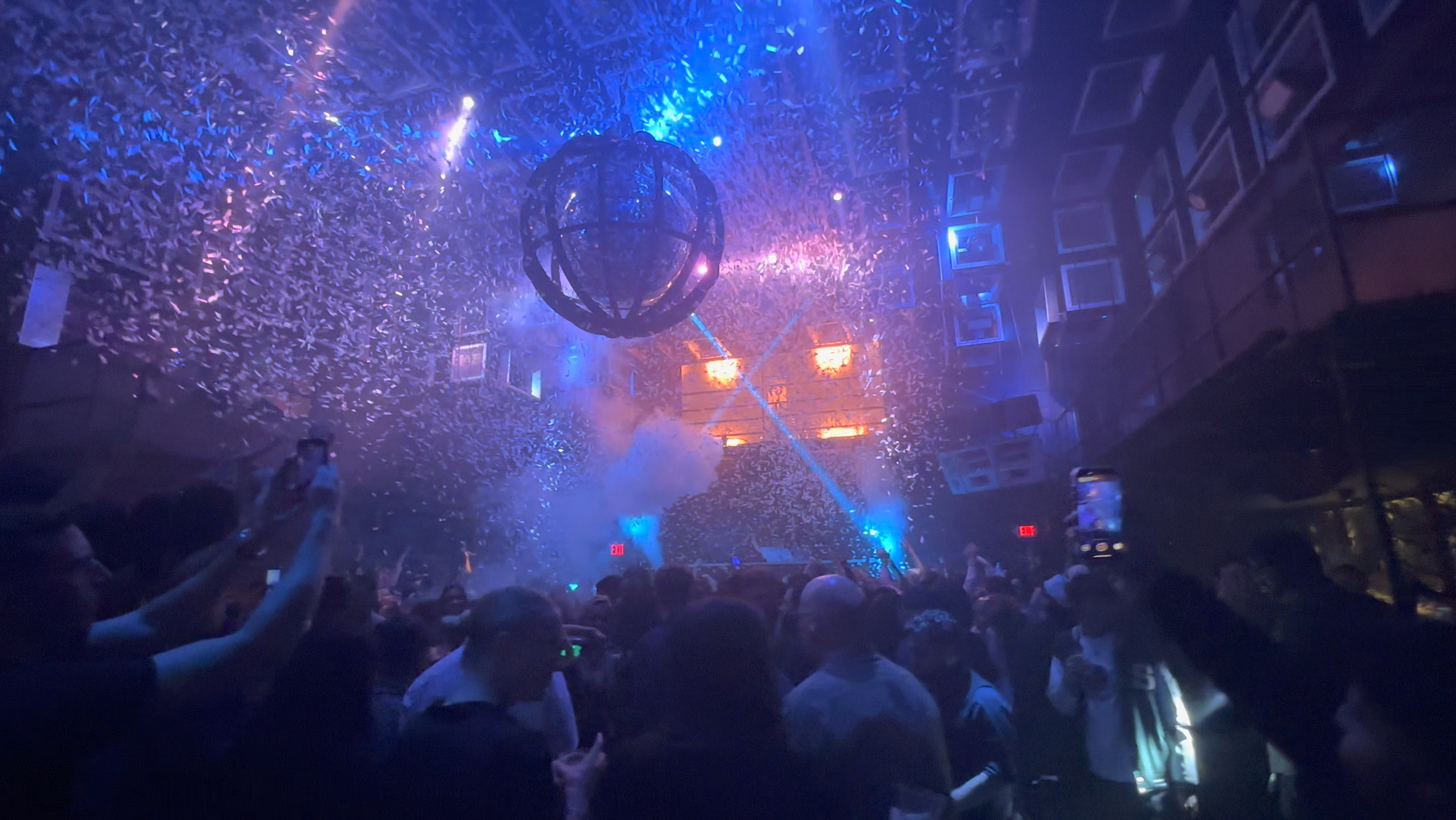
Strauss and Tepperberg's first nightclub, Marquee New York, in March 2025

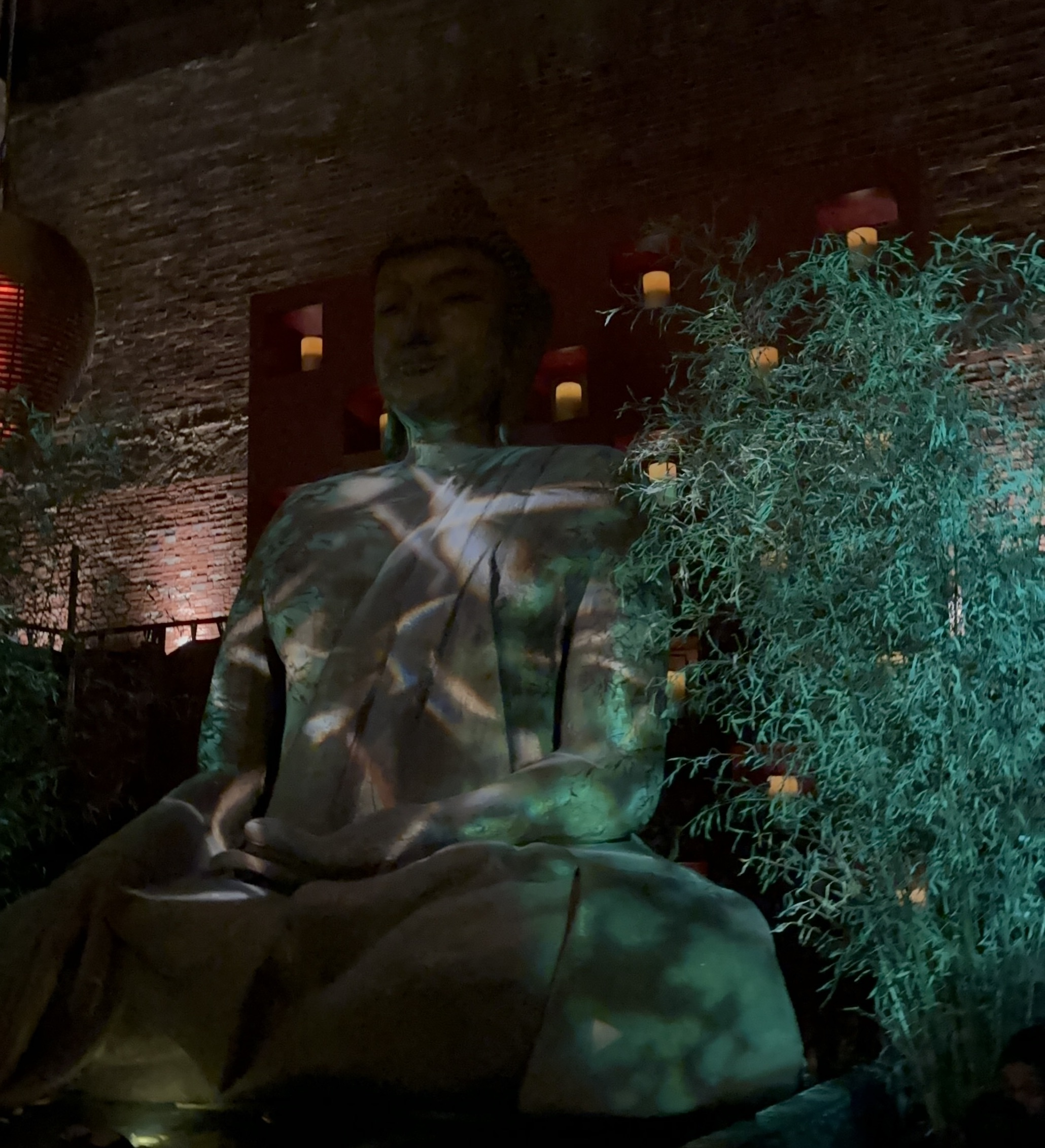
Tao Uptown's Buddha statue

=== Strategic Group (2003-2017) ===
Officially incorporated in 2009, the business that would later become Tao was started by Jason Strauss and Noah Tepperberg promoting parties and eventually spring break vacation and party packages between Boston University and the University of Miami, with these parties being dubbed as "Jason and Noah present". Strauss and Tepperberg would later expand their promotional services into Strategic Group, a PR, events, and marketing company which primarily gained business by offering all three services under one firm. The founders of the 58th-street restaurant Tao Asian Bistro, Marc Packer and Rich Wolf, had hired Strategic Group previously to throw events at Tao. In 2003, Strauss and Tepperberg, backed by Packer and Wolf, opened their first nightclub, Marquee, in Manhattan's Chelsea neighborhood at a former parking garage.

Strauss and Tepperberg would later pair with Tao's original founders, Marc Packer and Rich Wolf, to open a Las Vegas location inside of the Venetian Hotel, including both a Tao restaurant and a nightclub in 2005. Per an interview with Hospitality Design in 2023, Tepperberg sees the success of Tao Las Vegas as credited to Tao becoming the first restaurant nightclub hybrid with a seamless transition between the two venues. By December 2010, Marquee would open a Las Vegas location as well which would include a dayclub pool party side. According to a 2012 interview with Eater, Strauss described the Marquee as a "mini-Coachella" happening on the roof of the Cosmopolitan hotel. Also in March of 2012, Marquee expanded to Australia, with a location inside of The Star, Sydney.

By 2011, Tao Las Vegas was described by The Atlantic as the most profitable restaurant in the United States, in addition to the highest grossing, with over $60 million per year in revenue. The key to its growth, according to the Bloomberg author Joel Stein, was credited to the nature of high spending in Vegas and its high revenue percentage of alcoholic beverages at 75% compared to 30% from other restaurants, though Stein elaborates the most on Tao's ability to marketing both to conventional audiences from the Venetian's convention center as well as to the celebrity and party crowds. That same year, Tao also hosted the grand opening of the Dream Downtown Hotel at the site of the former Maritime Hotel, and presently operates both the hotel's bar and two of its own nightclubs inside, PHD Rooftop and the Electric Room, in addition to the former steakhouse Marble Lane.

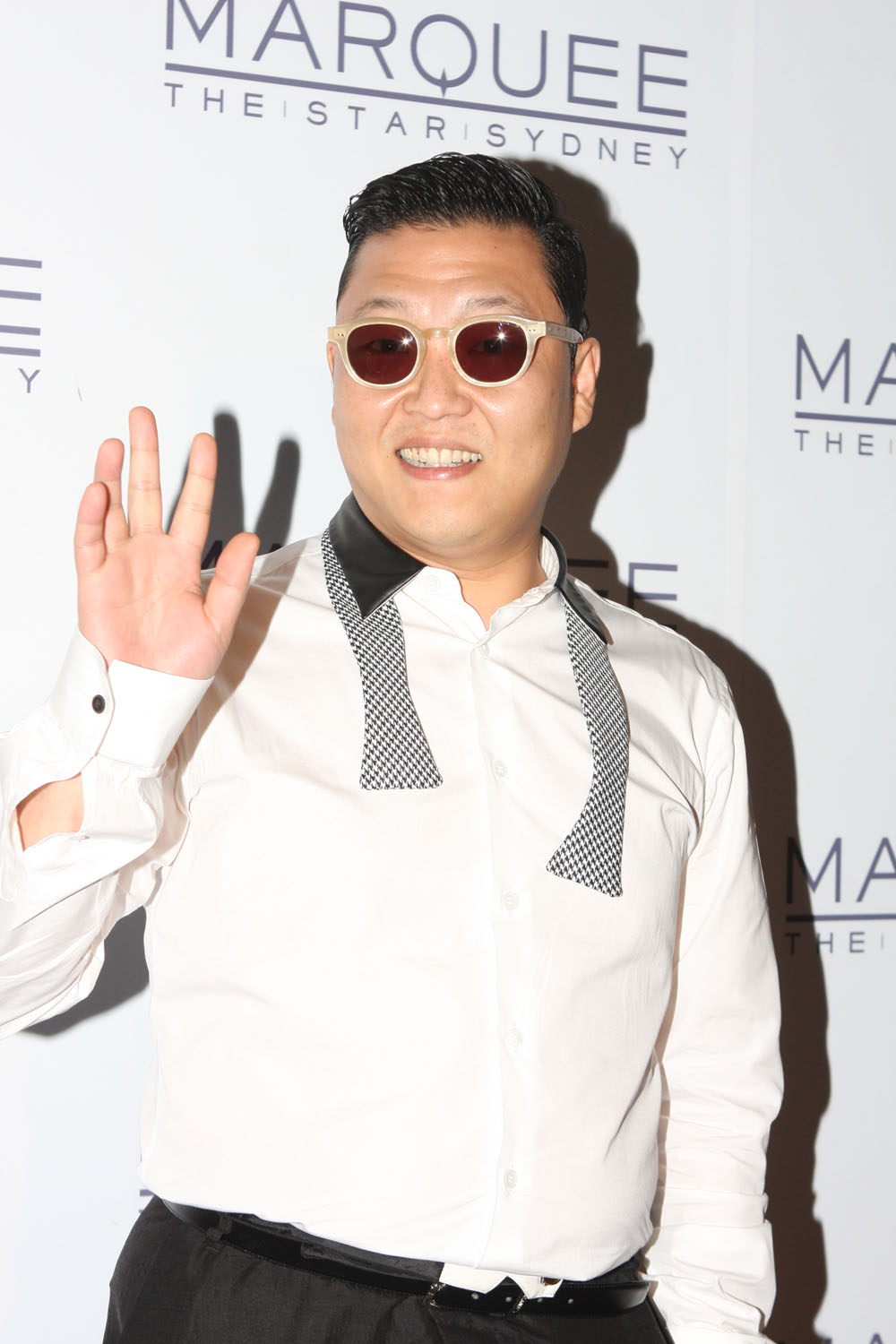
Psy in 2012 at Marquee Sydney

Across the early 2010s and continuing afterwards to the present day, the Tao Group would partner with the Moxy Hotel group to begin most of their new concepts. Moxy hotels in New York City are presently the home of numerous Tao concepts, such as the Magic Hour rooftop nightclub at the Times Square Moxy, the Fleur Room rooftop lounge at the Chelsea location, the Silver Lining Lounge jazz club and Loosie's nightclub both at Moxy's Lower East Side location, and the French restaurant Cathédrale inside of the East Village hotel. In 2014, Marquee Las Vegas also tested delivering bottles by drone.

Tao faced a class action lawsuit in 2015 filed by Abu Ashraf, a busser from 2000 to 2012, saying that he and other bussers were forced to split their tips with non-tipped workers while being paid below minimum wage, specifically workers at Tao who polished silverware and dishes plus those who stocked dishes, all without interacting with customers unlike servers and bussers. According to the suit, Tao changed the operations around 2012 so that polishers were paid above the hourly minimum wage and excluded the tip pool, though Ashraf's class action asked for the unpaid wages plus attorneys costs and damages for the employees the suit alleges were shorted by Tao. The next month, the suit was voluntarily dismissed without prejudice. A separate controversy involving tips at Tao preceded the 2015 class action by two years, where a tennis player listed the Tao Group as among many New York City restaurants that automatically added tips to bills, a practice prohibited by the city's laws for parties smaller than eight people.

=== MSG investment (2017–2023) ===
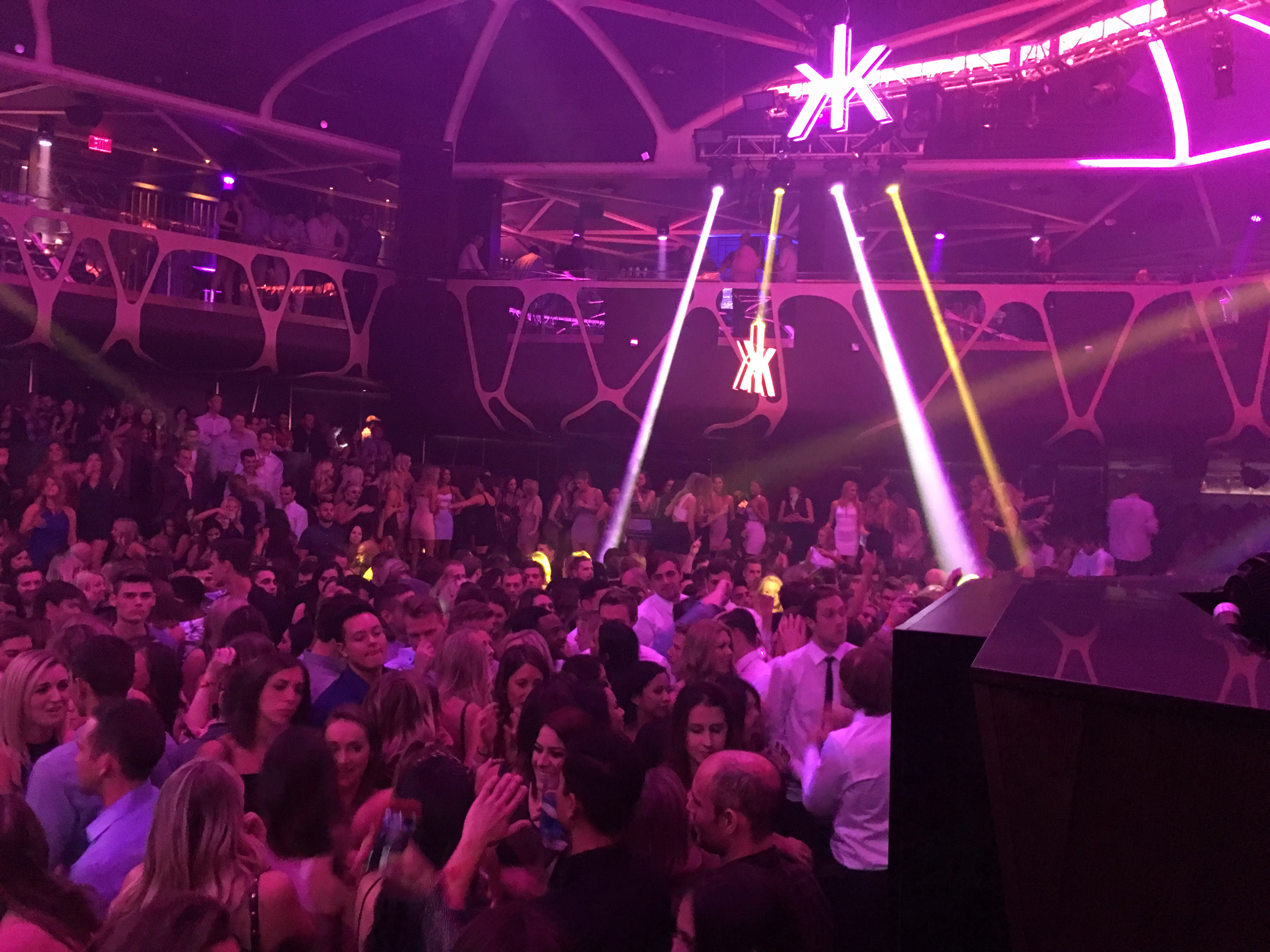
Hakkasan Nightclub at the MGM Grand Las Vegas, acquired by Tao in 2021

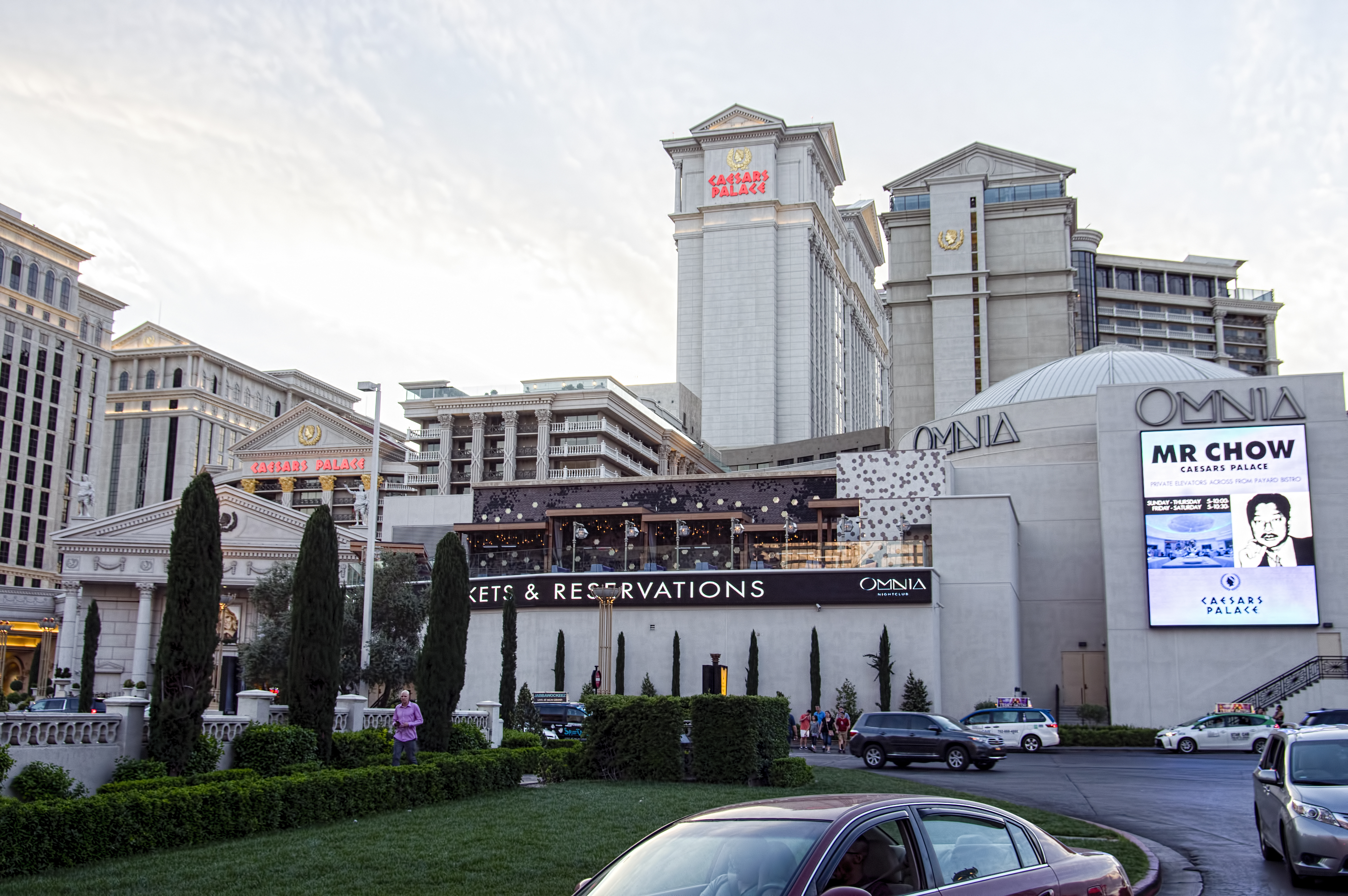
Omnia Nightclub at Caesars Palace from the exterior

In 2017, former Cablevision CEO James L. Dolan, whose family controlled the Madison Square Garden Entertainment, purchased a 62.5% stake in the Tao Group for $181 million USD in 2017; Wolf, Packer, Strauss and Tepperberg would keep a 37.5% remaining stake as well as run day-to-day operations for the group. Tao had previously been the target of other potential offers and discussions, including a potential buyout from the Hakkasan Group, which Tao itself would later acquire in 2021.

Tao would later launch a partnership with Las Vegas Sands to open concepts inside of the Marina Bay Sands resort in Singapore. In April 2019, Tao opened Singapore's largest nightclub – an offshoot of Marquee – which included an indoor ferris wheel and a three-story slide. The group had earlier expanded their LAVO Italian concept to the rooftop of Marina Bay Sands in 2017, and concurrent with the opening of Marquee Singapore, Tao also opened and operated a Singapore location of its Avenue speakeasy first started in New York and a new Japanese concept named Koma.

Back in Las Vegas, Tao would begin collaborating with Station Casinos through its public holding company Red Rock Resorts to open restaurants at Palms Casino Resort, though this agreement would be terminated in 2018. While details were confidential, both companies confirmed that no payment would be required on either's side; in covering the deal's termination, Scott Roeben from Vital Vegas would suggest that MSG's acquisition would drive off-strip competition and stifle plans for their new Sphere venue, which was undergoing the initial planning and constriction stages at that time.

In 2021, Tao announced plans for its first hotel, located in Orlando, Florida near the Walt Disney World resort. The hotel, part of a collaboration between real estate developer Unicorp at their new development named O-Town West, will feature a Rockwell-designed Tao restaurant as well as a rooftop experience. Construction on the hotel began in 2024, with expected opening in 2025.

2021 also saw Tao enter into an agreement to acquire Alan Yau's Hakkasan Group, which put not only the namesake Cantonese restaurant under Tao ownership and operation but also three Las Vegas nightclubs and numerous other restaurants, including Yauatcha, Omina, Jewel, Casa Calavera, and Ling Ling. As Tao's chief competitor in Vegas, Strauss saw the opportunity come as of a result of the COVID-19 Pandemic, and given the high amount of "synergy" between the two groups, Strauss described the acquisition of Hakkasan as a "one plus one equals three, right of the bat".

=== Mohari ownership (2023–) ===
With MSG Entertainment building the Sphere in Las Vegas which would open in 2023, to help finance its construction, MSG sold off its 66.9% ownership in the Tao Group to Mohari Hospitality, a firm dominated by Mark Scheinberg. The deal, which was hinted at as early as January of that year, was announced the following April, with Mohari buying MSG's stake in Tao for $550 million USD. Mohari prior to the acquisition was primarily known for luxury hotel investments like the Four Seasons Hotels location in Madrid.

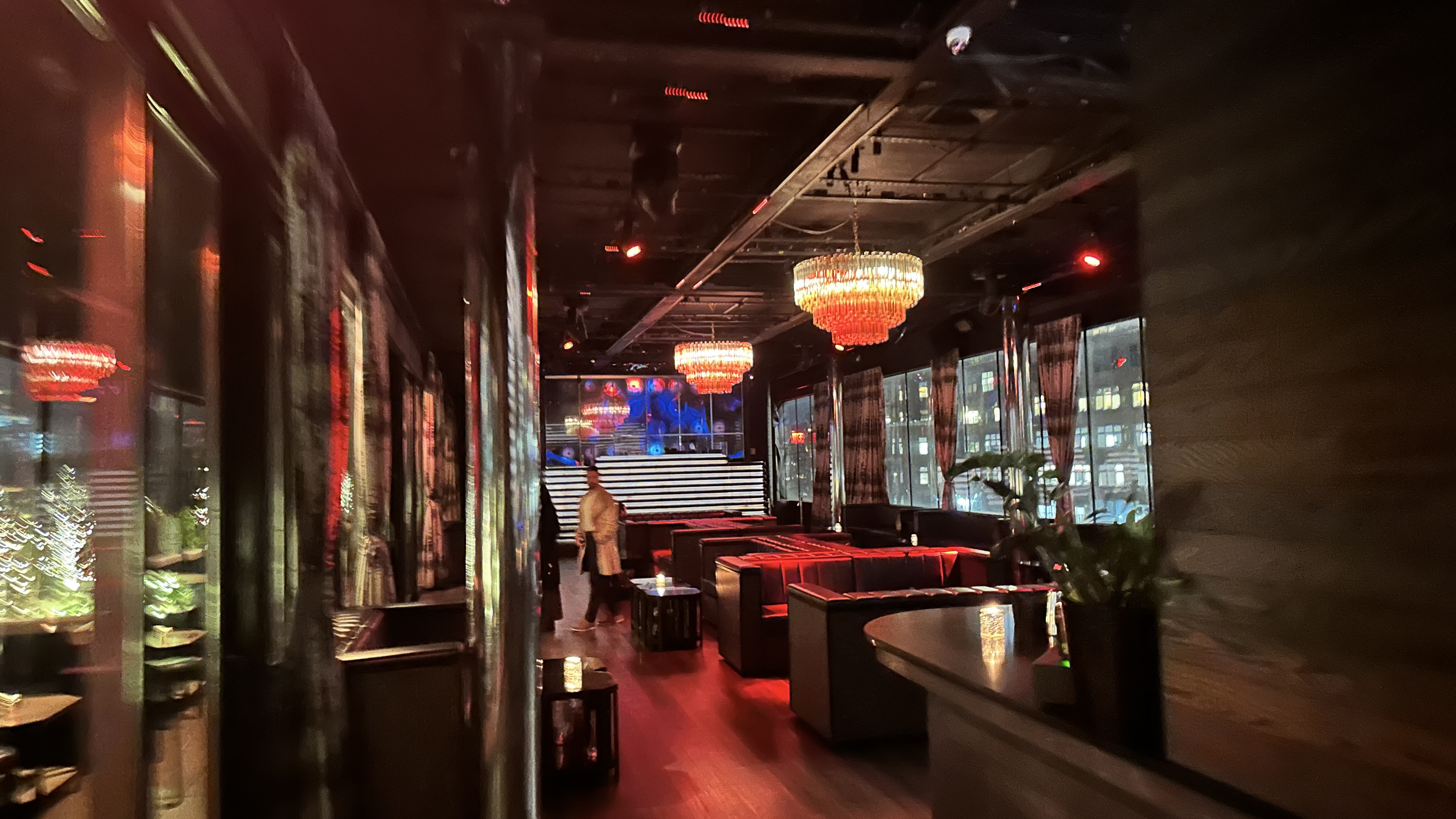
PHD Rooftop at the Maritime Hotel (today Dream Downtown)

After the October 7 attacks, Strauss and Tepperberg hosted a November fundraiser for the Israeli emergency services provider United Hatzalah at the Los Angeles location of Lavo Ristorante, and shortly before at Al Coro, a recently bought restaurant prior to its transformation into Crane Club. The Los Angeles fundraiser, organized in partnership with Jason Pomeranc, noted Danny Abeckaser, Elon Gold, and many other hospitality group owners and partners as guests, and raised $1 million for United Hatzalah.

Under Mohari ownership, Tao announced a partnership in 2024 with OKO Group to develop a rooftop Mediterranean members only restaurant in Miami's Brickell district. Previously in Miami in 2023, Tao opened a joint venture with David Grutman's Groot Hospitality named Casadonna, a waterfront Italian restaurant that first opened in 2023. In August 2025, however, magazine The Real Deal reported that Tao and OKO had parted ways on the venture, though OKO would still open a restaurant and service club now independent of Tao.

Also in Miami, Tao collaborated with the 2025 edition of Ultra Music Festival to operate their VIP sections, though received considerable attention for offering a $425,000 bottle service package titled "Fuck You Money", which offered 200 bottles of Pharrell William's own Moet & Chandon Nectar Imperial Rosé ,100 bottles of Dom Perignon Brut Luminous and 100 Dom Perignon Rosé Luminous.

In 2025, the Tao Group and MGM Resorts International partnered with Kygo's Palm Tree Crew to rebrand the dayclub Wet Republic into the Palm Tree Beach Club, with Tao handling operations. The 3,000-guest venue will span 60,000 square feet in area, with Strauss promoting the rebranded pool party as a cross between Palm Springs and Beverly Hills. That same year, the club would separately ink a deal with the Australian fashion brand Outcast Clothing to supply Tao venues with uniforms for one year. Part of the deal also included Tao working with its festival partners to offer Outcast-branded VIP tables at music festivals such as Coachella, Ultra, and Electric Daisy Carnival. Tao also renovated Marquee New York and Marquee Las Vegas during the summer and opening a Marquee seasonal popup at 30 Hudson Yards' rooftop observation deck, while closing French concept Cathedrale's location at the Aria in Las Vegas and dropping prices at the London locations for Hakkasan and Yautacha.

==== Proposed Greenpoint venue ====
The Northern Brooklyn neighborhood of Greenpoint in New York experienced a surge of restaurant openings and demand in 2024, with Tao among the groups interested opening. The group filed paperwork including liquor licenses to open at 25 Franklin Street, formerly the home of Vans' "House of Vans" music venue and more recently a short-lived immersive arts venue named ArtsDistrict after it failed to repay its vendors. Tao's applications request serving liquor until 4am and have a maximum capacity of 1,000 customers. Residents and representatives of Greenpoint have led highly publicized movements against the planned venue, and according to some local accounts including New York State Senator Kristen Gonzalez, Assembly member Emily Gallagher, and New York City Council Member Lincoln Restler, almost the entire neighborhood opposes Tao's new project. New York's State Liquor Authority has confirmed that it has received letters of opposition already from elected leaders and numerous residents.

==== Hakkasan Group divestiture ====
In September 2025, Scheinberg and Mohari unveiled plans to separate Hakkasan, Ling Ling, and Yautacha from Tao Group and reestablish the Hakkasan Group. Mohari hired Yavuz Pehlivanlar as CEO of Hakkasan, formerly the CEO of Caprice Holdings. Scheinberg stated that he intended to expand Hakkasan's concepts as a fine dining company worldwide.

== Venues ==
Tao presently lists 91 venues and establishments on its website, though some, such as Tao Downtown, are listed separately for its restaurant and nightclub sections. Many of Tao's locations and brands that shuttered underwent so due to the impact of the COVID-19 pandemic on the hospitality industry.

=== Tao Asian Bistro ===
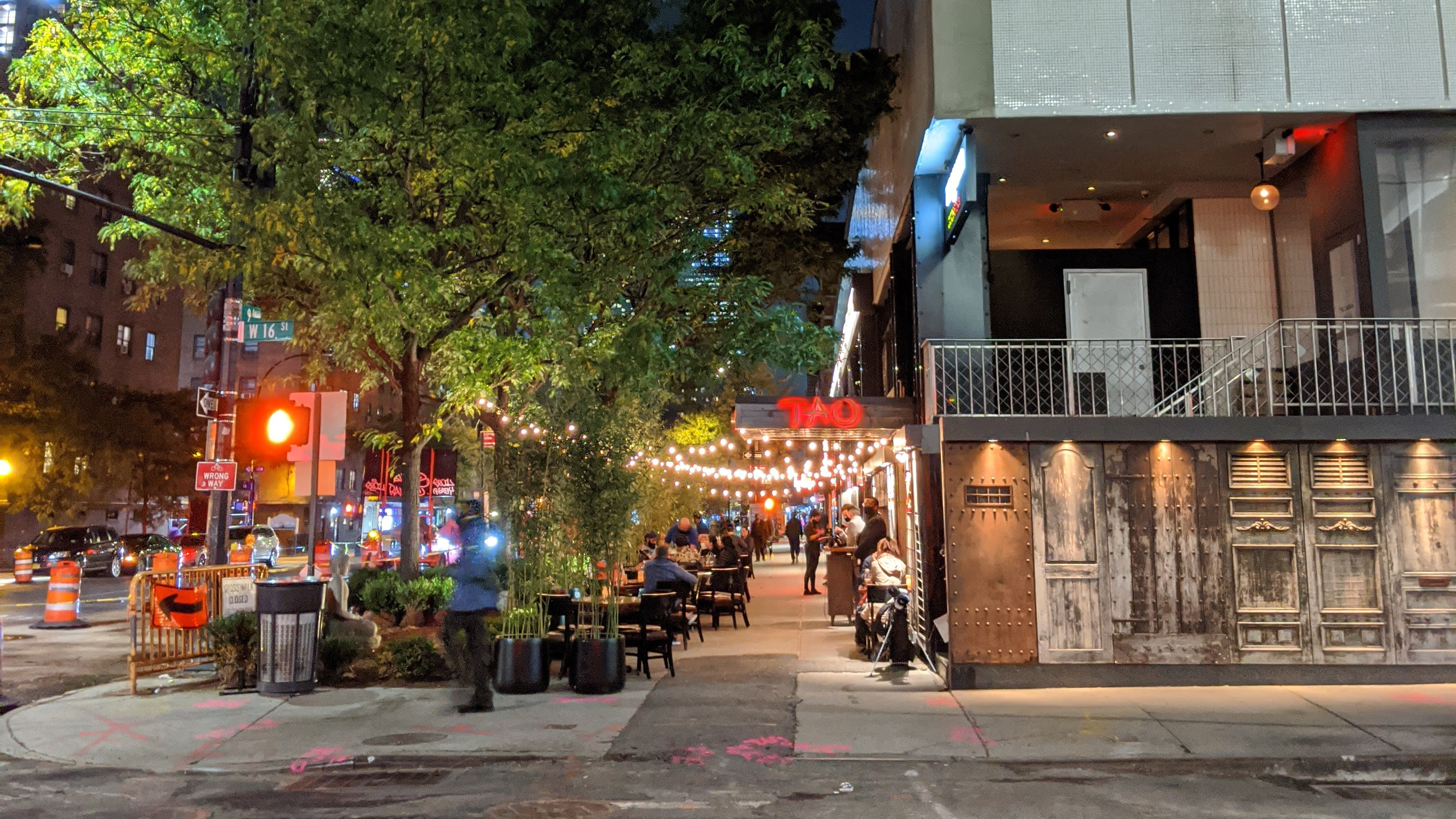
The exterior of Tao Downtown in Chelsea, Manhattan

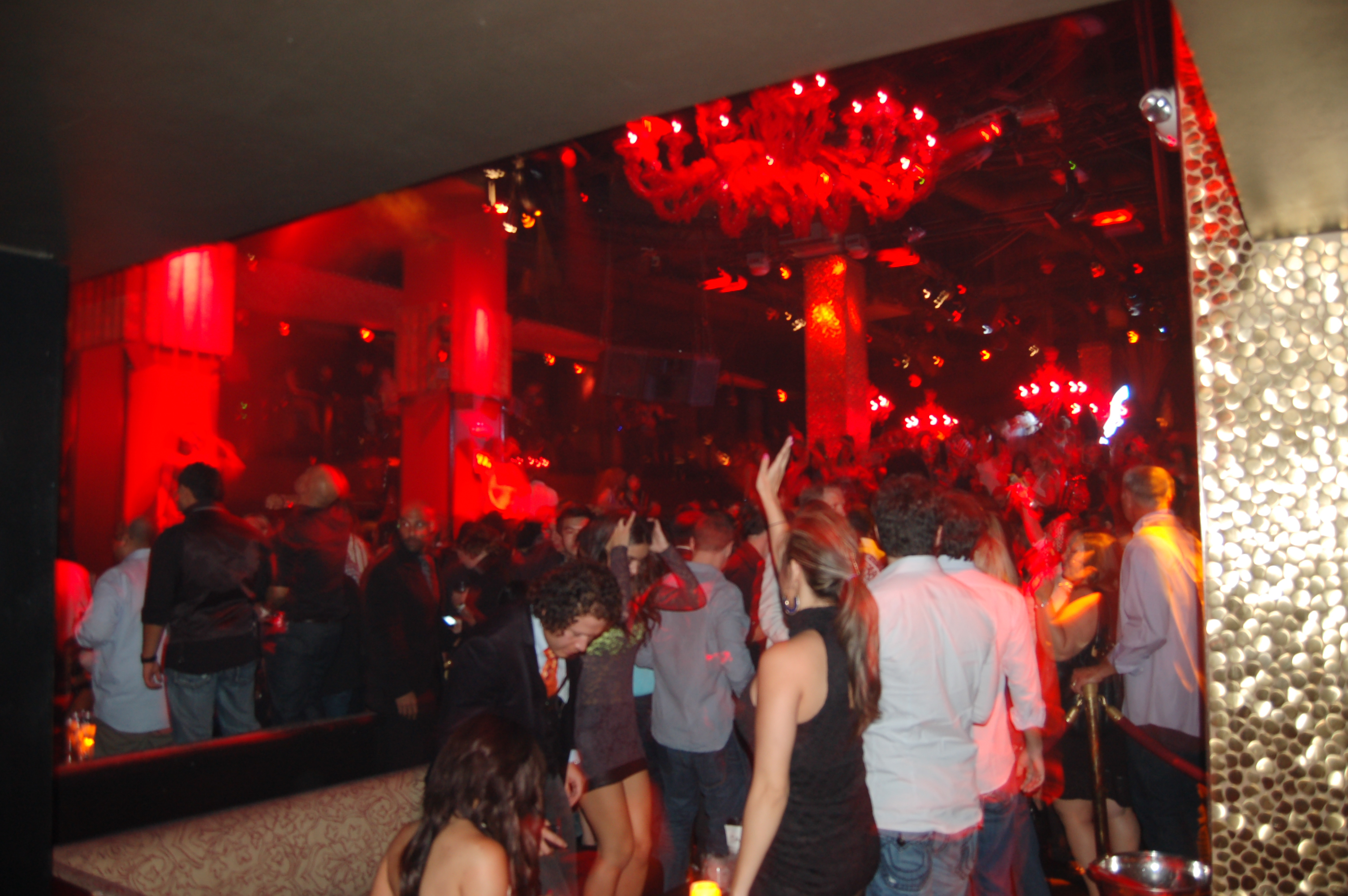
Tao Las Vegas' nightclub inside The Venetian

Tao is an Asian Fusion restaurant (Note: According to the Venetian Resort, where Tao's Las Vegas location is based out of, the restaurant fuses Thai, Chinese, and Japanese cuisines) which opened its first location in 2000 at the site of a former Vanderbilt coach house. There are six Tao locations all in the United States, namely two in New York and one each in Chicago, Las Vegas, Los Angeles, and the Mohegan Sun, with the locations in Chicago, Manhattan's Chelsea district and the Venetian in Las Vegas containing adjacent nightclubs also called Tao, and the Vegas location further being the home of the dayclub Tao Beach.

Tao's Las Vegas location opened in 2005, and by 2017, that location became the highest-grossing independent restaurant in the United States by revenue, earning around $43.7 million. Tao's downtown New York location, which opened near the Chelsea Market in 2013 and features an adjacent nightclub, ranked at third place in 2017. In 2007, the group opened Tao Beach, a daytime pool party on the roof of both the nightclub and the restaurant. Tao Beach underwent a major renovation in 2020, coincidentally the year of the COVID-19 pandemic, and reopened in 2022.

According to The Atlantic, Tao's Las Vegas location is not just the highest grossing restaurant in America, but per 2011 figures, also its most profitable, and that it is able to keep much of its revenue by marketing to more conventional demographics during the week juxtaposed by populations keen on clubbing during the weekends, assisted by the nature of visiting Las Vegas revolves much more around spending than other destinations; both demographics do not see the other party at Tao Las Vegas. Tao is often regarded as a place for celebrity sightings in New York, with Billboard noting that various celebrities including Beyoncé, Jay-Z, Chance the Rapper, and Afrojack being spotted at both the Downtown and Uptown locations. Conversely, the mini-chain has been strongly criticized though for the inclusion of a Buddha statue inside of most of its restaurants, and for "exoticizing" Asian cuisines. Tao Downtown has also been noted as one of the loudest restaurants in New York, and in testing Apple's AirPods Pro with hearing aid features, The New York Times used Tao Downtown as their testing ground.

=== Lavo ===
Lavo is an Italian restaurant which first opened in Midtown Manhattan before expanding to Las Vegas, Singapore, Los Angeles, and London. Lavo's New York location, which opened originally in 2010, closed in January 2024 due to the new landlord redeveloping the site. The restaurant, planning to reopen at another location, presently offers delivery service. The New York location also featured an underground nightclub Tepperberg viewed his club as the last remaining nightlife hotspot in uptown Manhattan, despite the first Tao restaurant located across the street from Lavo's former location.

Lavo has expanded to Las Vegas, Los Angeles, London, and Singapore, the latter of which was the first collaboration between the Tao Group and the Marina Bay Sands resort through the implementation of Lavo into the resort's rooftop pool area. Located on the 57th floor, the Singapore venue includes both indoor and outdoor dining areas overlooking the city skyline. Los Angeles' Lavo location opened in 2022 on the Sunset Strip. The London location was the most recent to open inside of London's BoTree hotel in 2024, where the year prior Tao partnered with the hotel to oversee all food and beverage services.

=== Beauty & Essex ===
Opened in 2010, Beauty & Essex is a Chris Santos-operated restaurant initially established in New York's Lower East Side and later expanding to Las Vegas' Cosmopolitan in 2017 and the Mohegan Sun resort in 2025. The restaurant features a pawn shop-themed entrance leading into a series of distinct dining rooms and lounges, creating a hidden, speakeasy-style atmosphere. The menu offers a variety of shareable plates and classic cocktails with modern twists, emphasizing social dining.

Beauty & Essex's pawn shop entrances also double as functional pawn shops, and the Las Vegas location's shop at opening was the sole store of its type on the Las Vegas Strip. 2016 estimates saw the New York location serve approximately 6,500 customers per week, and both the New York and Las Vegas venues are each 10,000 square feet.

In 2017, Beauty & Essex opened a Los Angeles location in the same complex as Tao Asian Bistro, Avenue, the Highlight Room, and the Dream Hotel in Hollywood. Santos expressed interest in opening a Los Angeles location for Beauty & Essex as early as 2015. The Los Angeles location was reported closed on Yelp by March 28, 2024.

=== Crane Club ===
In 2023, the Tao Group bought the New York Italian restaurant Al Coro, which gained fame for earning two Michelin Stars. Al Coro's head chef, Melissa Rodriguez, stated though that the restaurant, while it would close, would be redeveloped into another restaurant which Rodriguez would continue to work at as head chef. The new restaurant, Crane Club, differed from Al Coro by no longer strictly confiding to French or Italian cuisines. In an interview with Eater, Tepperberg commented he viewed Crane Club as the most formal restaurant that Tao had ever been a part of. Tepperberg further commented that Tao's new majority owners in Mohari had influenced the more formal luxury direction some of the company's restaurants have taken, citing Mohari's luxury hotel portfolio. In contrast to Al Coro and its former iteration Del Posto, while still retaining Rodriguez, Crane Club relies heavily into proteins and meat-based dishes. Crane Club was also heavily inspired by the trend of members-only restaurants opening in New York.

=== Marquee ===
Marquee is a nightclub with three locations presently open in New York City, Las Vegas, and Singapore. The first Marquee was opened in 2003 on 10th Avenue in New York by Strauss and Tepperberg, at the site of a former parking garage. Opening first in 2010, Marquee Las Vegas in its first full year of business was the highest-grossing nightclub in the world, with an annual revenue between $70 million and $80 million USD in 2011.

Harvard Business School published a case study on Marquee's original location titled "Marquee: The Business of Nightlife," authored by Professor Anita Elberse. Initially suggested to study the nightclub by her two students, Elberse was later invited by Tepperberg to study the club. Her study analyzes the launch and operational strategies employed by the high-profile Marquee nightclub upon its opening in New York City. It examines key challenges and decisions faced by the management team, focusing on elements crucial to success in the upscale nightlife industry, such as creating buzz and exclusivity, managing capacity and demand (including door policies), implementing premium pricing strategies like bottle service, and dealing with intense competition. The case is utilized in business education to explore concepts of marketing, brand building, operational management, and strategy within the context of the luxury entertainment and hospitality sector. Upon Marquee renovating and reopening to the public in 2013, Elberse reconducted her study and published "Marquee: Reinventing the Business of Nightlife" as a follow up to her initial study. By 2010, Marquee was making annual revenues of $7 million.

Marquee later opened a location at The Star, Sydney, which operated for ten years starting in February 2022 before closing in 2022. The club also wasted for being one of the few establishments not affected by Sydney's lockout laws, which required that no new people were admitted after 1:30 AM and last drinks for bars, pubs and clubs at 3:00 AM. Scott Wharton, then the recently appointed CEO of The Star, stated that "incidents and issues have surfaced at times", though the Marquee Sydney's closure happened at the same time The Star was implementing changes based on a government review investigating whether The Star was able to hold a gambling licence from the state of New South Wales.

In 2019, Marquee opened its fourth location in Singapore inside of the Marina Bay Sands resort inside a former theater at Marina Bay Sands. At the time of opening, Marquee was Singapore's largest nightclub spanning 2,300 square meters under a 30 meter high ceiling, and more than twice as large as other Singaporean nightclubs like Zouk in Clarke Quay and Ce La Vi inside of the Marina Bay Sands. Distinctly, Marquee Singapore also hosted an indoor ferris wheel and a slide. Marquee Singapore opened alongside more Tao concepts at Marina Bay Sands, including Koma, a new sushi bar and Japanese restaurant, and Avenue, a speakeasy which originated in New York City in 2009 and expanded to Los Angeles in 2017.

=== Omnia ===
Omnia is a nightclub brand with one location at Caesars Palace in Las Vegas. Acquired by Tao when the company bought the Hakkasan Group, Omnia formerly had a San Diego location that opened in 2015. The club, which hosted many famous DJs, shut down in 2020 due to the COVID-19 pandemic, and did not reopen after restrictions were relaxed; after the acquisition, the Tao Group instead opted to sell Omnia San Diego to Insomniac and reopened as Nova San Diego. Tao would remain as a minority partner in Nova.

=== Avenue ===
Avenue was a former nightclub in New York which operated between 2009 and 2020; the Singapore location inside of the Marina Bay Sands resort remains open. The club branded itself as a "gastrolounge" and had no cover charge upon opening, and was comparatively quieter and more open to conversation. In addition to serving food, Avenue also lacked a dance floor, with The New York Times comparing it more so to a living room rather than Strauss and Tepperberg's previous work.

Avenue gained coverage in 2009 after Jho Low, the primary figure behind 1Malaysia Development Berhad, allegedly spent $160,000 in a single night. Jho, however, would later push back against the claims and state that the party at Avenue was for a friend's engagement, which he was told would cost around US$160,000, before going on to say he would "not spend that kind of money".

=== Vandal ===
Vandal was a former two-floor street art and street food inspired restaurant and nightclub located in New York's Bowery neighborhood, open from 2016 to 2020. The 22,000 square foot restaurant featured two dining areas, a cellar bar and lounge, a "secret garden", and a private dining area, and was decorated with art from artists including but not limited to Hush, Apex, and Shepard Fairey. Vandal's cuisine was primarily inspired by European and Asian street food, and like Beauty & Essex, its menu was designed by Chris Santos. The New York location further was the location of IMG's fashion week party in 2016, hosted by Rich Wolf. Vandal was also due to come to the Palms Casino Resort in Las Vegas, though the termination of the agreement in 2018 ultimately prevented this from happening.

== Incidents ==
In 2008, Marquee New York was shuttered after cops made seven undercover buys of cocaine and illegal narcotics inside.

In 2012, Marquee's Las Vegas location became the target of an injury lawsuit after security allegedly assaulted him over an issue with the signature on his $10,000 VIP table. The plaintiff, hedge fund manager David Moradi, alleged that the nightclub staff "hit and smashed David's head into the concrete and continually held his head and right eye against the concrete with a high degree of pressure", demanding a credit card and an ID. Moradi's hedge fund, which managed roughly $1 billion and netted $11 million in revenue, closed after Moradi's night at Marquee, and he subsequently sued the group for causing him a brain injury. Moradi was ultimately awarded $160 million in compensatory damages and asked for $640 million when including punitive damages; the suit was later settled out of court, though Marquee lawyers argued that any amount over $49 million in punitive damages would be financially ruinous for the company.

Marquee's Singapore location became the setting of a ticketing scam in 2022, where a teenager, posing as a Marquee employee, sold 21 fraudulent tickets to a sold-out event featuring Jackson Wang at the club in order to make back losses from gambling. The 19-year old suspect netted $7,055 from the illegal operation, and pleaded guilty to six counts in 2023.

November 2022 saw one of Tao's rooftop New York venues, the Highlight Room, attract criticism for denying two plus-size influencers and models, Alexa Jay and Ella Halikas. The two stated they were turned away by the bouncer of The Highlight Room because of their size. The group responded to NBC News saying that they were engaged in talks with the two, though the two influencers, despite confirming they had spoken with the group, stated that they had not received an apology from Tao. Jay and Halikas also started the hashtag #NotTonight on TikTok to raise awareness of ongoing discrimination against plus-sized people in nightlife.

In July 2024, Ariel Roman, a former employee of the group who was terminated in December 2022, entered Tao Downtown wearing a disguise and dumped fecal matter into the koi pond. According to the company, which filed a criminal complaint against Roman, after her termination, she had engaged in various activities which included harassing other employees and threatening to burn down the group's venues. Tao claimed that Roman caused $3,000 in damages and sought to ban her 50 yards from all of their property. Roman countered Tao's allegations against her by arguing she had attempted to flag the group about a promoter for one of the group's clubs engaging in abusive relationships, spiking drinks, and sexually harassing younger female clientele. Roman additionally detailed that she stopped showing up to work after she by her account discovered her boyfriend, then a promoter independently contracting with the Tao Group, cheated on her and impregnated two women, and that she threw the poop into the koi pond in order to attract attention.

Near the end of that year in a separate incident, a man with severe food allergies died eating at Beauty & Essex' Las Vegas location, after informing the restaurant of his severe shellfish allergy. The lawsuit alleged that Beauty & Essex's staff actively prevented aid from coming to the man while he was in anaphylactic shock, and that staff made insufficient efforts to help.
