= Al Coro =

Italian restaurant in New York City

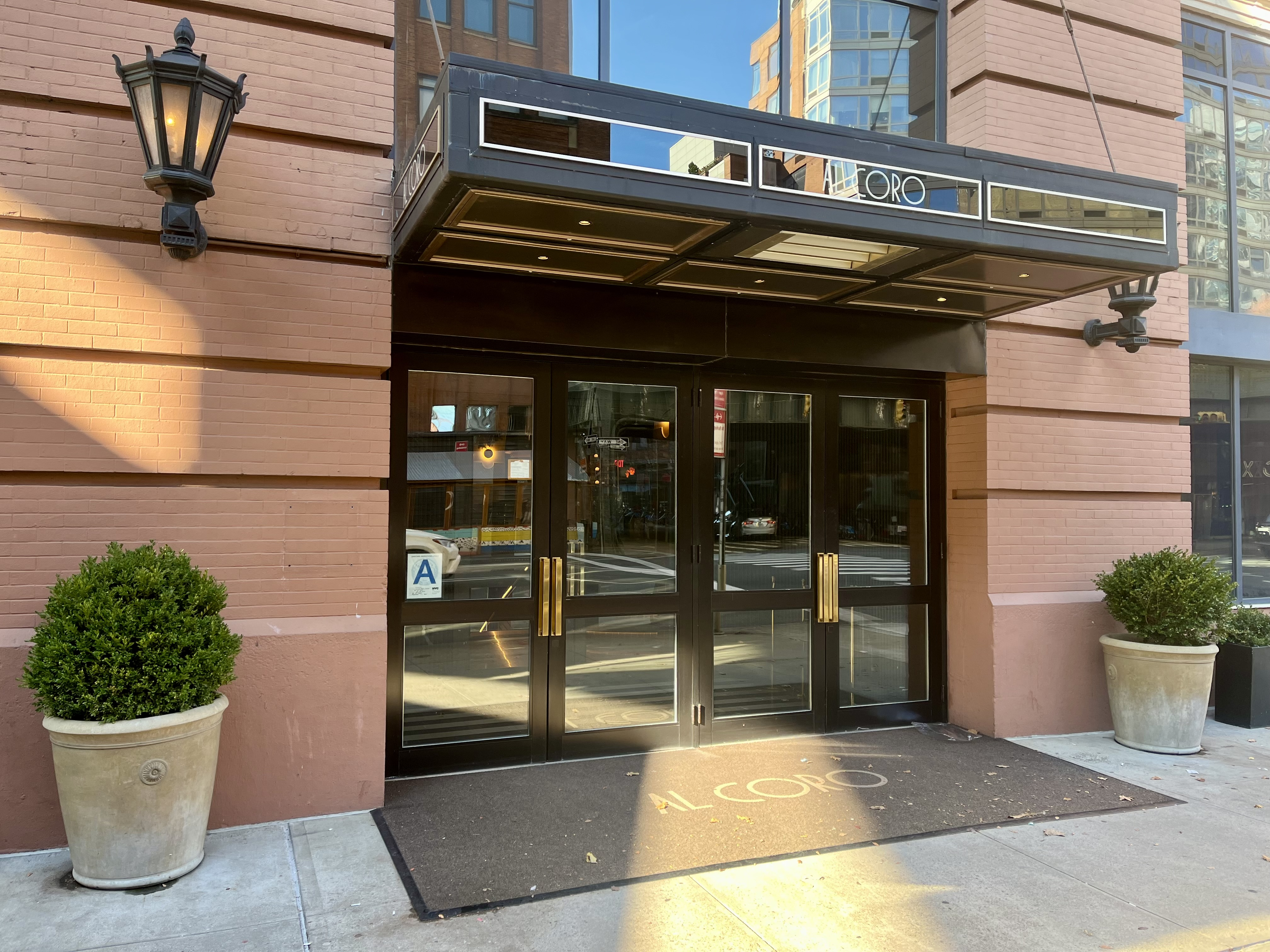
- Al Coro in December 2023
- Interactive map of Al Coro

Restaurant information
- Head chef: Melissa Rodriguez
- Chef: Katherine Rock
- Pastry chef: Georgia Wodder
- Food type: Italian
- Rating: (Michelin Guide)
- Location: 85 Tenth Avenue, New York City, New York, 10011, United States
- Coordinates: 40°44′36.3″N 74°0′27.2″W
- Website: www.alcoro-nyc.com

Al Coro was a restaurant in New York City, New York. The Italian restaurant opened in 2022 in the space formerly occupied by Del Posto, and had received two Michelin stars.

Al Coro closed in 2023 after the venue was acquired by Tao Group Hospitality and the staff repurposed into Crane Club, a new restaurant still headed by Al Coro's head chef Melissa Rodriguez.

== See also ==
- List of Italian restaurants
- List of Michelin-starred restaurants in New York City
