= Jason Strauss =

American businessman and property developer

- Born: April 7, 1974 (age 52); Manhattan, New York City, U.S.
- Education: Boston University
- Occupations: Nightclub and restaurant owner
- Known for: Co-CEO of Tao Group Hospitality

Jason Strauss (born April 7, 1974) is an American businessman and developer who is the co-CEO of Tao Group Hospitality, a restaurant and nightlife conglomerate with over 50 locations in which he co-founded with his childhood friend, Noah Tepperberg.

== Early life ==
Strauss was born in 1974 and raised in Manhattan. He attended Riverdale Country School in The Bronx, where he later hosted a homecoming party, at which he met Noah Tepperberg. The two became friends and had a mutual interest in throwing parties. The two began by hosting prom and college parties before entering the nightclub industry. Strauss graduated from Boston University in 1997 with a Bachelor of Science degree in communications and Hospitality management.

== Career ==
Strauss moved back to New York City and in 1997 formed a special events, public relations, and marketing company known as Strategic Group whose clients included PlayStation and Coca-Cola. In 2003, he started Marquee New York in Manhattan's Chelsea neighborhood with Tepperberg. The nightclub quickly grew to host over 1,200 guests a night and began Strauss' full time career in the nightclub hospitality business. He, Marc Packer and Rich Wolf, who owned Tao Asian Bistro New York nightclub, and Tepperberg partnered to open a new nightclub known as Tao Asian Bistro Las Vegas inside the Venetian in 2005.

The venue became the most successful of his career. By 2011, Tao Las Vegas had become both the highest-grossing and the most profitable restaurant in the United States, generating over $60 million in annual revenue. It went on to top Restaurant Business magazine's annual "Top 100 Independents" ranking of highest-grossing independent restaurants for multiple consecutive years through the mid-to-late 2010s.

Tao Group Hospitality was formed in 2009 to operate his and Tepperberg's properties. He has hosted some of the world's most famous

Strauss founded LAVO, an Italian restaurant with locations in the Marina Bay Sands, Mexico City, and Las Vegas.

== Recognition ==
Strauss and Tepperberg have also been named among nightlife's most influential figures: Observer's inaugural "Most Powerful People in the Nightlife and Dining Industry" list and as one of the "50 Most Powerful People in EDM"

The commercial durability of Marquee became the subject of two Harvard Business School case studies by professor Anita Elberse: "Marquee: The Business of Nightlife" (2009) and its revised sequel, "Marquee: Reinventing the Business of Nightlife" (2013, revised 2019) where Strauss and Tepperberg were invited to Harvard for the case study's presentation. For more than a decade the pair have returned to co-teach the case study annually, including an April 2026 full-day course with Professor Elberse on the hospitality industry, structured around Marquee's expansion from a single New York venue to a global, multi-brand portfolio.

== Asia Expansion ==
Strauss and Tepperberg led Tao Group's expansion into Asia through the company's partnership with Las Vegas Sands, its landlord at the Venetian and Palazzo in Las Vegas and the owner of Marina Bay Sands in Singapore. LAVO opened atop the Marina Bay Sands SkyPark in January 2018 as the group's first venture in Asia. It was followed in April 2019 by Marquee Singapore, the country's largest nightclub, built inside a former theater at the resort. The group also opened the lounge Avenue and the Japanese restaurant KOMA at Marina Bay Sands.

== Sale to MSG Company ==
In February 2017, Strauss, Tepperberg, Marc Packer and Rich Wolf sold a 62.5% stake to The Madison Square Garden Company for $181 million plus a potential $25.5 million earn-out, retaining a 37.5% interest and day-to-day operating control.

== Hakkasan Acquisition ==
In April 2021, Tao Group Hospitality acquired Hakkasan Group, roughly doubling the size of the company to 61 venues across 22 markets on five continents. The acquisition expanded Tao's U.S. footprint into Southern California and Miami and gave it its first foothold in London and the Middle East.

== Sale to Mohari ==
In April 2023, MSG Entertainment agreed to sell its 66.9% interest to Mark Scheinberg's Mohari Hospitality in a deal valuing the company at roughly $550 million, with Strauss and Tepperberg remaining co-CEOs and shareholders.

== Current Operations ==
Tao Group Hospitality today operates more than 80 branded locations in over 20 markets across four continents, with flagship venues in New York, Las Vegas, Los Angeles, London, Dubai, Singapore and Sydney. Strauss and Tepperberg jointly lead the company as co-CEOs.

== Omnia Nightclub ==
Omnia Nightclub at Caesars Palace came under Tao's operation through the Hakkasan acquisition. Tao Group subsequently developed OMNIA Dayclub & Skybar — a 46,000-square-foot complex designed with Rockwell Group and connected to the nightclub by a dedicated bridge, forming a combined 121,000-square-foot venue. It opened May 15, 2026, with mainstream coverage from Rolling Stone and many others.

== Personal life ==
Strauss resides in Las Vegas and purchased a home for 10.75 Million Dollars in 2025.

In November 2023, he and Tepperberg helped raise over $1 million for Israel through the United Hatzalah Emergency Relief Fund, following the Hamas attack the month prior and said, "the hospitality industry is all about bringing people together. It’s what we do".
