= Noah Tepperberg =

American businessman

- Born: August 15, 1975 (age 50)
- Education: University of Miami
- Occupations: Nightclub and restaurant owner
- Spouse: Melissa Wood (m. 2016)

Noah Tepperberg (born August 15, 1975) is an American businessman who is the co-CEO of Tao Group Hospitality, founded when he with longtime friend Jason Strauss merged their nightclub and event operations group with Marc Packer and Rich Wolf's Tao Asian Bistro.

== Biography ==
Tepperberg is a graduate of Stuyvesant High School. He earned a BBA degree from the University of Miami with a double major in business management and entrepreneurship.

== Career ==
Tepperberg began promoting parties with a friend, Jason Strauss, when the pair were in high school. In 1997, they created a business partnership focused on creating nightclubs, restaurants and other venues of nightlife entertainment. Among their early ventures was the supper club, Metronome, located in New York City's Flatiron district; Conscience Point, an existing nightclub-restaurant that they redesigned and relaunched in Southampton, NY with partners, Billy Masterson and Stephen Baldwin; and Luahn, a Manhattan lounge-restaurant.

In 2003, Tepperberg and Strauss with investor Chris Barish, opened Marquee nightclub in New York City. In April 2004, Vanity Fair included Tepperberg, Strauss and Barish in the magazine's "Kings and Queens of Clubs" article, featuring the major nightlife impresarios of New York at the time. Soon thereafter, Tepperberg and Strauss partnered with Tao Asian Bistro founders Marc Packer and Rich Wolf to open their location at The Venetian Las Vegas and added partner Lou Abin to the Tao Group in 2008.

As part of Tao, Tepperberg, Strauss and associates opened AVENUE in New York's Chelsea neighborhood (May 2009); LAVO restaurant and nightclub in Midtown Manhattan (September 2010; temporarily closed in 2024); Marquee Nightclub and Dayclub at Cosmopolitan of Las Vegas (New Year's Eve 2011); Dream Downtown Hotel in New York City (June 2011); Marquee at The Star Casino in Sydney, Australia (March 2012); TAO Downtown in New York's Chelsea neighborhood (September 2013); as well as numerous other clubs and restaurants in the US and internationally.

On February 1, 2017, Tepperberg, along with his partners, sold a majority stake in Tao Group to the Madison Square Garden Company. They continue to run the day-to-day operations of the company. In 2023, the stake was, in turn, sold to Mark Scheinberg's Mohari Hospitality for $550 million.

The success factors behind the unusual longevity of Tepperberg and Strauss's nightclub, Marquee, have been the subject of two case studies by Harvard Business School professor Anita Elberse -- "Marquee: The Business of Nightlife" (2009) and its updated follow-up version, "Marquee: Reinventing the Business of Nightlife." (2013, revised 2019).

== Personal life ==
In 2016, Tepperberg married model and health and wellness coach Melissa Wood in a ceremony at the Plaza Hotel in Manhattan. He and his wife live in New York City and have two children.
