= Maritime Hotel =

Hotel in Manhattan, New York

Coordinates: 40°44′33″N 74°00′14″W

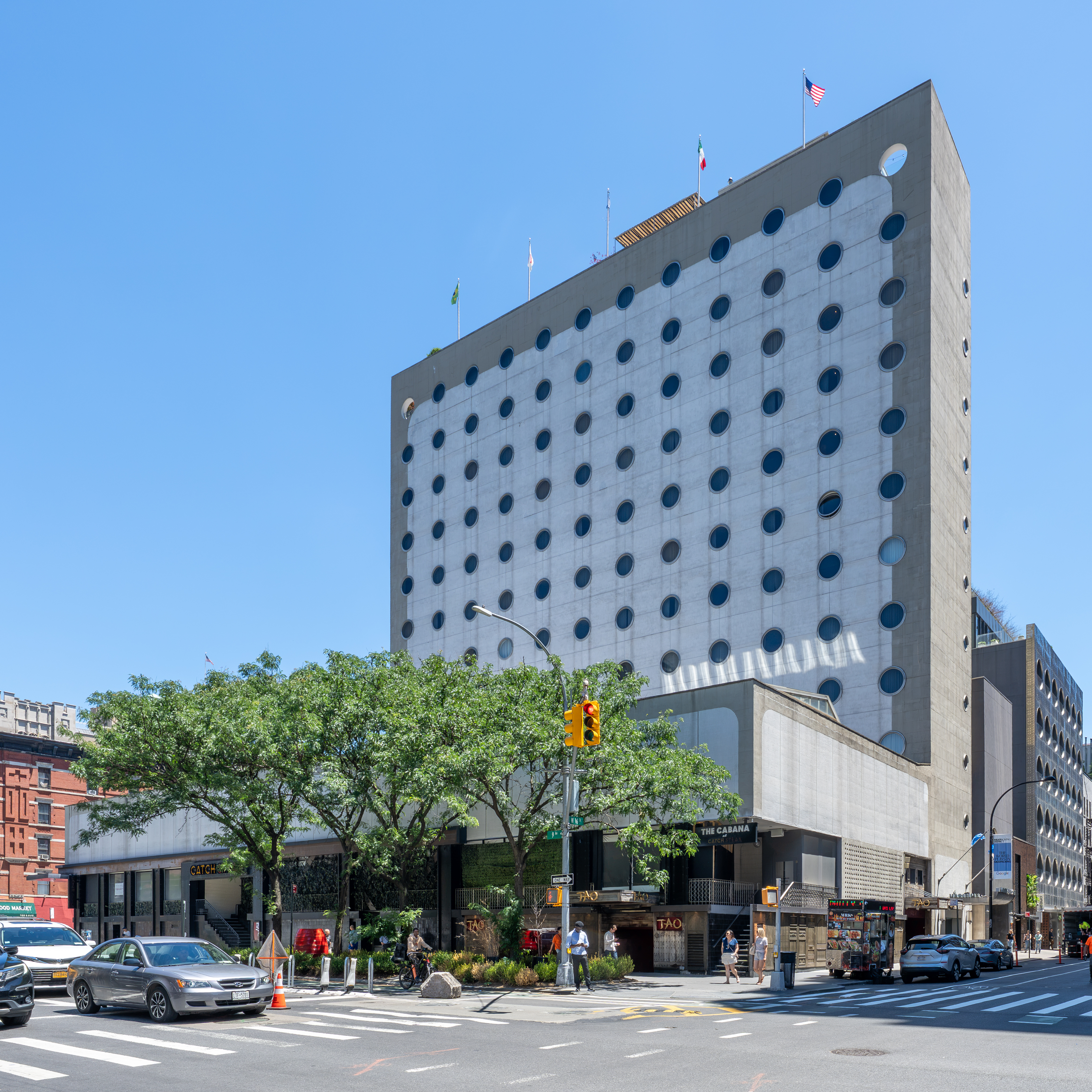
The Maritime Hotel's Ninth Avenue facade

The Maritime Hotel is a luxury boutique hotel located at 363 West 16th Street at Ninth Avenue in the Chelsea neighborhood of Manhattan, New York City, close to the Meatpacking District. It has 121 rooms and 5 suites, all decorated in a nautical theme, in line with the building's maritime history, and the porthole-inspired facade.

== Building ==
New Orleans–based architect Albert C. Ledner designed three buildings for the National Maritime Union of America in the 1960s, all white buildings that prominently featured portholes as an architectural feature. The first, in 1964, was the union's headquarters building at Seventh Avenue between 12th Street and 13th Street, which became part of the now-closed St. Vincent's Medical Center and is now the Lenox Health Greenwich Village Phyllis and William Mack Pavilion. The second was the building at 346 West 17th Street, which runs through to 16th Street, which the union used as an annex to their headquarters. The final one was the "pizza box" building which became the Maritime Hotel, whose primary facade faces Ninth Avenue.

The 17th Street building was completed in 1966, and the Ninth Avenue building a few years later; they were named the Joseph Curran Annex (17th Street) and Plaza (Ninth Avenue), after the union's first president. The Curran buildings held offices for the union and its pension fund, medical and training facilities, dormitory rooms for seaman, a gymnasium, swimming pool and 900-seat auditorium.

The fortunes of the union collapsed due to reduced activity in the Port of New York, and the two buildings at Ninth and 17th were sold in 1987 to Covenant House, a drug-rehabilitation program, which used them as a shelter and educational facility for runaways, and then in 1994 to the Chinese government, which operated them as the New York Service Center for Chinese Study Fellows, which provided housing and other services for Chinese artists, students and businessmen. In 2001, Sean K. MacPherson and Eric Goode, two nightclub and restaurant entrepreneurs, bought Ninth Avenue "pizza box" building for $19 million, and began converting it into a hotel with developers Richard Born and Ira Drukier. The hotel opened in 2003.

In the 1990s, the 17th Street building had its unique sloped facades – created to meet the setback requirements of the 1961 Zoning Resolution – covered up with fake brickface storefronts, designed to "unify" the building with the rest of the block and eliminate the "total lack of human scale" of the sloped facade; the alteration appalled Ledner when he came to visit in September 2007. It was converted into another hotel in 2011, named the Dream Downtown Hotel, designed by Frank Fusaro. The brickface from the 1990s was removed.

== See also ==
- National Maritime Union
