= Anita Elberse =

American economist

Anita Elberse is a Dutch-American economist who is a professor of business administration at Harvard Business School, specializing in the entertainment, media and sports sectors.

Trained as an economist and econometrician, according to The Wall Street Journal, she "takes the same statistically rigorous approach to entertainment and cultural industries that sabermetricians do to baseball" in her scholarly research. She has published more than four dozen in-depth case studies on companies and personalities in the world of entertainment, and one book, “Blockbusters: Hit-making, Risk-taking, and the Big Business of Entertainment.”

Elberse has garnered attention for drawing famous athletes, actors, musicians, and other entertainers to her classes and programs, both as speakers and as students.

== Career ==
Elberse joined Harvard in 2003, and was awarded tenure eight years later, making her one of the youngest female professors to have earned that honor in Harvard Business School's history. Prior to joining Harvard, Elberse was a visiting fellow at The Wharton School, University of Pennsylvania. She holds a PhD from London Business School, an MA in communication from the Annenberg School for Communication, University of Southern California, and an MA in Communication Science from the University of Amsterdam (cum laude). She is a native of the Netherlands.

External videos
- The Business of Entertainment, Media, and Sports -- The 2018 Edition, Anita Elberse YouTube Channel, 6:08

Elberse was named one of the 40 best business school professors under the age of 40. She has also won the HBS Faculty Teaching Award and the Case Centre's “Outstanding Case Teacher” award.

== Research ==
Elberse first rose to public prominence with a 2008 article in the Harvard Business Review on Chris Anderson's long tail theory. She analyzed sales and customer transaction data that revealed that digital distribution does not diminish the importance of blockbuster hits. On his blog, Anderson responded to the study, praising Elberse and the academic rigor with which she explores the issue but drawing a distinction between their respective interpretations of where the "head" and "tail" begin. Elberse addressed the inconsistencies in Anderson's arguments in a subsequent response.

In more recent years, she has primarily focused on field research. Variety has cited her “series of fresh, entertainment-focused cases for future execs and management students.” That series includes studies on entertainment conglomerates Disney and NBCUniversal, soccer clubs FC Barcelona and Manchester United, top athletes LeBron James, Roger Federer, and Dwyane Wade, A-list entertainers Beyoncé, Dwayne 'The Rock' Johnson, Jay-Z, and Lady Gaga, content platforms Hulu and Disney+, sports leagues the NBA, NFL, and MLB, and the Metropolitan Opera.

== Teaching ==
=== MBA Course: The Business of Entertainment, Media, and Sports ===
Elberse has developed and teaches a popular course for second-year MBA students at Harvard on the "Businesses of Entertainment, Media, and Sports." The course debuted in 2008, and enrolls 180 students each year.

=== Executive Education Course: The Business of Entertainment, Media, and Sports ===
In 2014, Elberse launched a four-day executive education version of her MBA course. Open to executives and entertainers alike, past participants include Chris Bosh, Ciara, Chip and Joanna Gaines, Gerard Pique, LL Cool J, Kaká, Karlie Kloss, PK Subban, Lindsey Vonn, and Dwyane Wade.

=== Mentorship Program for Professional Athletes: Crossover Into Business ===
Since 2017, Elberse chairs a free mentorship program that matches active and recently retired professional athletes who want to learn about business to second-year MBA students who have volunteered to serve as mentors.

== Selected works ==
- Blockbusters: Hit-making, Risk-taking, and the Big Business of Entertainment (Henry Holt, 2013) ISBN 9780805094336
