= Michael Fuller (DJ) =

American DJ and nightclub executive

Michael Fuller (born October 17, 1972) is an American DJ, nightlife visionary and nightclub executive. He has managed the Palms Casino Resort, Baby's at the Hard Rock Hotel, Rain Nightclub, the Playboy Club, and others.

== Background ==
Fuller was born in Las Vegas, Nevada, and attended Faith Lutheran High School. He did not attend college or university, but worked his way through the ranks of Las Vegas' nightlife industry. He played a key role in developing rave and underground parties in the early '90s, and worked as a promoter and DJ, then marketing executive and vice president.

== Nightlife career ==
Fuller entered the Las Vegas nightlife industry as a promoter^{13} at the age of 19.^{5} He was instrumental in developing Las Vegas' rave and underground party scene in the early '90s, and has a reputation for events that combine fashion, art, performance and music into multi-sensory experiences.^{14} ^{13}

Fuller founded a graphic design and nightclub consulting firm, Moving Sun Studios, in 1992, which completed work for the Light Group^{1}, Peter Morton's Hard Rock Hotel and the House of Blues.

Fuller joined the management team at what was then a brand-new club, Utopia, in 1996,^{13} which became the go-to spot for electronic music in Las Vegas. During his tenure, he opened the Shamballah Lounge (Empire Ballroom), where he served as resident DJ (see below for details of his DJ career)

Fuller created a range of popular weekly parties, including SIN on Sundays at House of Blues, Godspeed at Foundation Room^{9} and Red Dragon Lounge^{13} at China Grill.

He managed Baby's at the Hard Rock Hotel (later renamed Body English, closed on New Year's Eve 2010), and ICE Las Vegas^{1} ^{13} ^{6} (now closed). During his time at ICE, he was frequently featured on the reality show, The Club on Spike TV.

Fuller made the move to the Palms Casino Resort in 2006, when he became the corporate director of marketing at the N9NE Group. Less than two years later, he was named vice president, and oversaw operations at Rain Nightclub, Moon and Ghostbar nightclubs, the Playboy Club, and two restaurants, Nove Italiano and N9NE Steakhouse. Fuller also delivered Las Vegas its first international superstar DJ resident—Paul Oakenfold and Perfecto Las Vegas—as well as DJ AM^{14} ^{12} ^{13}, who was later replaced by DJ Z-Trip. During this time, he attracted considerable attention for his international marketing campaigns, which helped attract new, mostly European clients to N9NE Group venues.^{7} Fuller also created Ditch Fridays at Palms Pool & Bungalows, Sunday After Dark at Playboy Club^{11}, an annual Playboy-themed Midsummer Night's Dream party, and brought Hed Kandi to Moon^{4} and Down & Derby to the Rain^{3}.

Fuller and N9NE Group parted ways in March 2010^{5} ^{10}, but he soon landed as vice president of business development at Neil Moffitt's Angel Management Group in 2010, where he did a brief stint doing brand development, advertising and promotions for Rehab at the Hard Rock Hotel, Wet Republic, and Studio 54 at MGM Grand, among other venues. In 2012 became the Executive Vice President of Development for Warner Hospitality after consulting for the company, as well as Paul Oakenfold, Hyde Bellagio, and Red Bull. His project portfolio includes entertainment strategy for the Hard Rock Hotel & Casino Sioux City and developing new boutique hotel franchises such as The William in New York City (opening December 2013).

== DJ career ==
As a DJ, Fuller performs under the name The Funkler. He has held residencies in Ibiza, Hawaii, and Las Vegas, and has performed for thousands at one-off shows across the country.

He performed at the Love Festival at the Palms and several other venues, internationally. He was named Las Vegas' best local DJ in 2003 and his album, "Live, Love, Laugh, Life" was named Las Vegas' best local music CD in 2000. Fuller's DJ career is officially on hiatus as of 2009, but he still performs on occasion.

Notable performances include:

- Club Utopia (Las Vegas), 1996–1999.
- Pimp n Ho/Club Rubber (Las Vegas) 1996–2006.
- Baby's at the Hard Rock Hotel (Las Vegas), 1999.
- Funky Tekno Tribe (San Francisco), 2000–2005.
- Godspeed at the Foundation Room (Las Vegas), 2001–2005.
- El Divino (Ibiza) 2004 (summer residency)^{13}
- Love Festival (Memorial Day Weekend) at the Palms (Las Vegas) 2009.
- Fabulous (Labor Day Weekend) at the Palms (Las Vegas),^{15} ^{13} 2009.
- Rain Nightclub at the Palms — Perfecto (Las Vegas), 2009 and 2010.

== Honors and awards ==
- Fuller was responsible for two Nightclub & Bar awards: Resident DJ of the Year (Paul Oakenfold, Perfecto Las Vegas at Rain Nightclub) and Single Promotion of the Year (Midsummer Night's Dream), both in 2010.^{2}
- Best Local DJ, Las Vegas Weekly, 2003
- Lifetime Achievement Award, Las Vegas Weekly, 2005.^{17}
- Best Nightlife Figure, Las Vegas Weekly, 2009.^{15}
- Best Local Music CD (for "Live, Love, Laugh, Life"), Las Vegas CityLife (Mike Prevatt), 1999–2000.
- Named as one of Las Vegas' Top 40 under 40 by In Business Las Vegas, 2006.^{18}
