= List of television shows set in Las Vegas =

This is a list of television shows set in Las Vegas and the Las Vegas Valley. Vega$ starring Robert Urich, which aired on ABC from 1978 to 1981, was the most notable TV series set in Las Vegas until 2000, when CSI: Crime Scene Investigation debuted on CBS. While casinos in Las Vegas were initially wary of hosting reality TV shows, the popularity of The Real World on MTV made them more receptive to working with TV producers.

== Series ==
First Run Start	First Run End	Title	Network	Studio	Notes
2010	2016	American Restoration	History	Leftfield Pictures	Chronicles the daily activities at Rick's Restorations, an antique restoration store, with its owner Rick Dale, his staff, and teenage son, as they restore various vintage to their original condition. A spin-off of Pawn Stars.
2004	2005	American Casino	Discovery Channel; The Travel Channel		Reality series tracking the daily events of the managers and employees of the Green Valley Ranch Casino.
2012	2012	Bad Girls Club	Oxygen	Bunim/Murray Productions	
2013	2014	Bad Ink	A&E	Sharp Entertainment	Reality series following tattoo artist and musician Dirk Vermin, owner of Pussykat Tattoo in Las Vegas.
1977	1977	Blansky's Beauties	ABC		Sitcom canceled after only 13 episodes. The series was a spin-off of Happy Days.
2005	2005	Caesars 24/7	A&E		Reality show.
1993	1994	Caesar's Challenge	NBC		
2004	2004	The Casino	Fox Network		Reality television program
2004	2006	Celebrity Poker Showdown	Bravo		Texas hold 'em tournament
1989		Cops	Fox Network		several episodes
2012		Counting Cars	History	Leftfield Pictures	Reality series chronicling the daily activities at Count's Kustoms, an automobile restoration and customization company. A spin-off of Pawn Stars.
1986	1988	Crime Story	NBC		starring Dennis Farina
2005	2010	Criss Angel Mindfreak	A&E		
2000	2015	CSI: Crime Scene Investigation	CBS		Crime drama series
2021	2024	CSI:Vegas	CBS		Crime drama series, based on CSI: Crime Scene Investigation
2010	2011	The Defenders	CBS	CBS Productions	starring Jerry O'Connell and James Belushi. Canceled after one season.
2011	2011	Drew Carey's Improv-A-Ganza	GSN		
2004	2004	Dr. Vegas	CBS		
2004	2005	Father of the Pride	NBC	DreamWorks	13 episodes. Cancelled after one Season.
2001	2006	Fear Factor	NBC		several episodes
1986	1990	Gorgeous Ladies of Wrestling	Syndicated		104+ episodes. 4 full seasons, a fifth season started shooting but was not distributed
2021		Hacks	Max		A famous veteran comedian showcased in Vegas hires a young L.A. writer. Starring Jean Smart, Hannah Einbinder, and Carl Clemons-Hopkins.
1992	1992	Hearts Are Wild	CBS		on Saturday evenings set at the Caesars Palace
2006	2010	Heroes	NBC		Features a fictional casino called "The Corinthian", owned by mob boss Daniel Linderman; characters of Niki Sanders, D. L. Hawkins, and Micah Sanders are from Las Vegas
2006	2007	High Stakes Poker	GSN		Poker series focusing on cash games rather than tournaments
1985	1985	Jem	NBC	Hasbro, Marvel Productions, and Sunbow Productions	The Holograms are scheduled to play a concert at a casino in Las Vegas, Nevada. When they discover that the Misfits are their opening act, they start to worry. The Misfits bring along Ashley and use her to lure Aja away, hoping that if Aja isn't there, the Holograms can't play and the Misfits will headline instead. Fortunately, Aja comes back in time, and they perform. Unfortunately, while the girls are on stage Eric Raymond's goons steal the money from the concert and frame Jem. Stormer and Ashley team up to tell the truth, and Jem's name is cleared.
2006	2007	King of Cars	A&E		
2006		King of Vegas	Spike TV		
2003	2008	Las Vegas	NBC		Comedy-drama series
2003	2003	Lucky	FX		Starring John Corbett
2011	2011	The Lying Game	ABC Family		
2009		Pawn Stars	History	Leftfield Pictures	Produced at the Gold and Silver Pawn Shop, 713 Las Vegas Blvd S
2015	2015	The Player	NBC		Thriller/Drama starring Philip Winchester, Wesley Snipes and Charity Wakefield.
2007	2021	Poker After Dark	NBC		late night poker television
2002	2003	The Real World: Las Vegas	MTV		Reality television program
2011	2011	The Real World: Las Vegas (2011)	MTV		Reality television program
2008	2010	Rehab: Party at the Hard Rock Hotel	truTV		Reality series of goings on at the Rehab pool party at the Hard Rock Hotel and Casino in Las Vegas
2014	2014	Queen of Hearts	NBC		Crime drama series
2026		Strip Law	Netflix	Gamblin' Cullentertainment; Underground; Titmouse, Inc.; Netflix Animation Studios	Adult animated series about lawyer Lincoln Gumb and his team practicing law in a hyper-exaggerated version of Las Vegas.
2007	2007	The Surreal Life: Fame Games	VH1		Reality television program featuring past contestants of The Surreal Life
2011	2018	Tanked	Animal Planet		Produced at Acrylic Tank Manufacturing, 3451 W . Martin Ave. Suite C
1962	1966	Teenbeat Club	KLAS-TV		Interview and Dance Show Production with Steve Miller and Keith Austin, hosts
2005	2005	Tilt	ESPN	ESPN Original Entertainment	Miniseries set in Las Vegas at the fictional World Championship of Poker (an obvious allusion to the World Series of Poker, covered by ESPN)
1978	1981	Vega$	ABC		starring Robert Urich
2012	2013	Vegas	CBS		Premieres September 25, 2012; Tuesdays at 10:00
2003	-	World Poker Tour	Travel Channel, NBC		several episodes

== Miniseries, specials or individual episodes ==
- Lucy-Desi Comedy Hour
  - "Lucy Hunts Uranium"
- What's New, Scooby-Doo?
  - "Riva Ras Regas"
- Rugrats
  - "Vacation"
- Ben 10
  - "Tough Luck"
- ICarly
  - "iLost My Head in Vegas"
- Timeless
  - "Atomic City"
- Modern Family
  - "Las Vegas"
- Friends
  - "The One in Vegas"
- Scooby-Doo and Guess Who?
  - "The Cursed Cabinet of Professor Madds Markson!"
- "Family Guy"
  - "Roads to Vegas"
- The Queen's Gambit (miniseries)
  - "Doubled Pawns"
- Married... with Children
  - "You Gotta Know When to Hold Them: Part 1"
  - "You Gotta Know When to Hold Them: Part 2"

== See also ==
- List of films set in Las Vegas
