= Dayclub =

Entertainment venue operating during the daytime

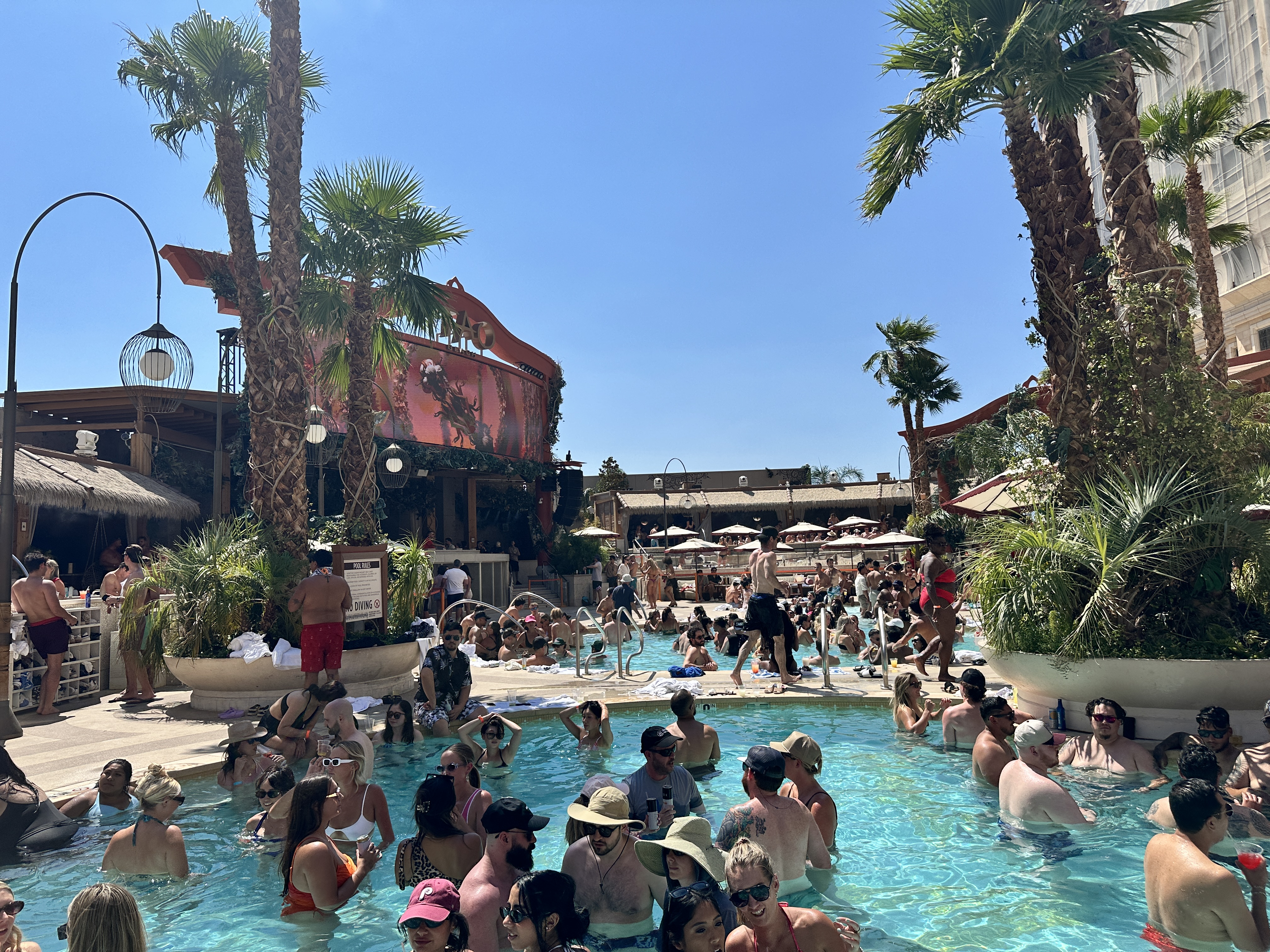
Tao Beach, a dayclub located in Las Vegas

A dayclub is a type of entertainment venue that operates primarily during the daytime, typically centered around poolside partying, music, and socializing. Similar in atmosphere to nightclubs, dayclubs in contrast often feature swimming pools, cabanas, daybeds, and large outdoor spaces designed for lounging and dancing. While like nightclubs they commonly include high-energy music played by live DJs, dayclubs emphasize on daytime leisure and vibrant atmospheres. Dayclubs originated in the resort city of Las Vegas, with the first major dayclub being Rehab at the first incarnation of the Hard Rock Hotel and Casino, while the first venues bearing the term "dayclub" would be at Bare Pool Lounge at The Mirage and Tao Beach at The Venetian.

Dayclubs generally serve food and beverages, with a focus on cocktails and bottle service. Many venues enforce dress codes, usually requiring swimwear or resort-style attire, and may impose restrictions on age, personal belongings, and behavior to maintain exclusivity and safety. Like nightclubs, dayclubs often employ security personnel and bouncers to manage entry and crowd control.

The busiest days for dayclubs are typically weekends and holidays, with peak seasons aligning with warm-weather months. Many dayclubs are located in resort destinations such as Las Vegas, Miami, and Ibiza, where they cater to tourists and partygoers seeking a high-energy daytime experience.

== History ==
Prior to day clubs being established, hotel pools at Las Vegas resorts were often restricted to guests of the hotel, and locals able to sneak into the resort. The first major hotel pool party to allow non-guests in, pending a cover charge, would be the former Hard Rock Hotel and Casino, when the hotel started hosting Rehab in 2004. Rehab would later become the subject of Rehab: Party at the Hard Rock Hotel, a three-season TV show on TruTV which highlighted life at the dayclub. Rehab would operate until 2018. As a result of growing popularity, a dayclub version of the Omina nightclub at Caesars Palace opened in 2026.

== Dayclubs outside of Las Vegas ==
=== Cleveland ===
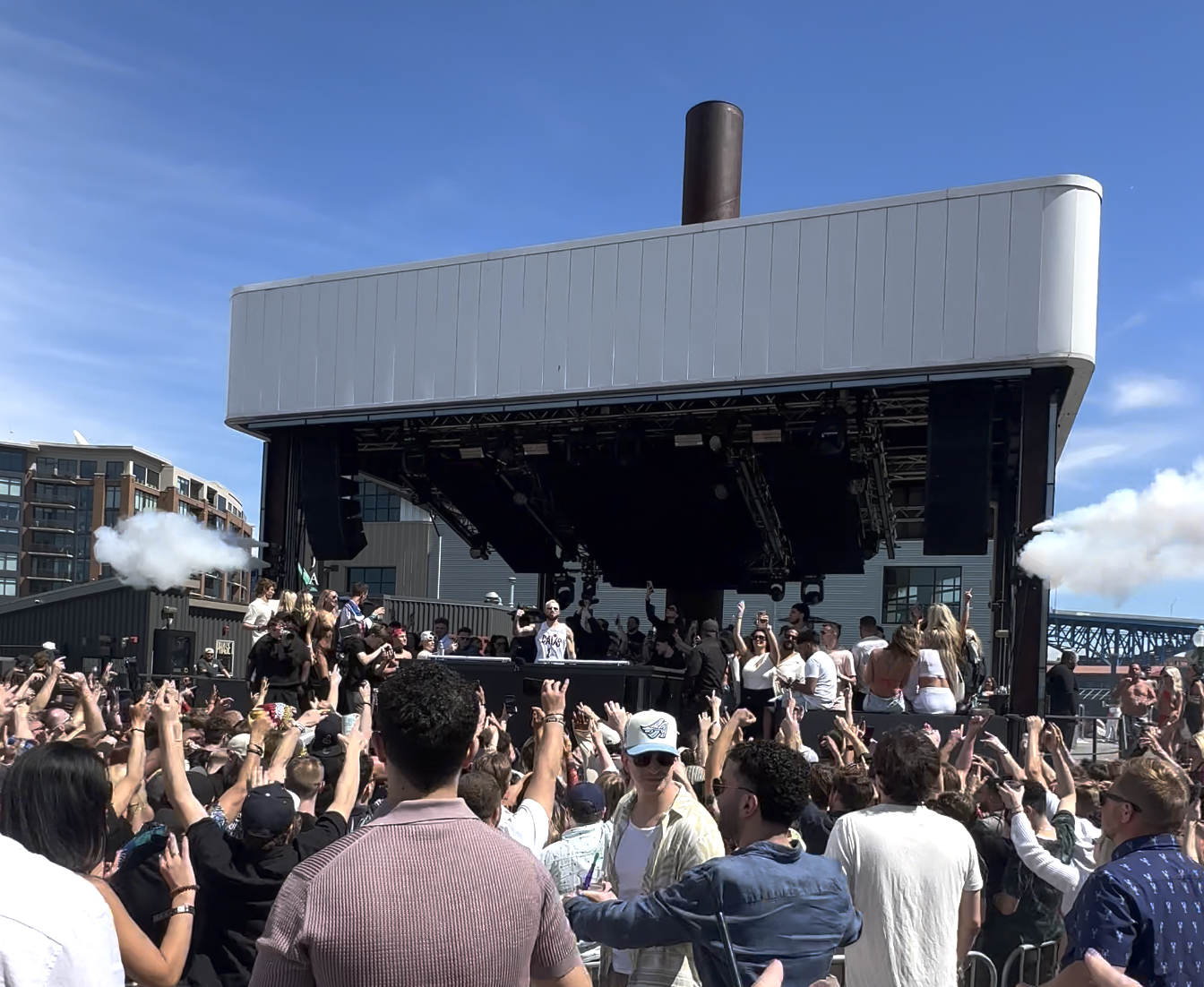
The dayclub FWD in Cleveland

Since the early 2010s, The Flats, a part of Cleveland located on the eastern bank of the mouth of the Cuyahoga River, has been at the center of proposals for a seasonal outdoor dayclub and nightclub. These ideas and proposals would eventually materialize in the form of an outdoor club with a pool known as FWD.
