= Rehab: Party at the Hard Rock Hotel =

American reality television series (2008–2010)

- Genre: Reality
- Country of origin: United States
- Original language: English
- No. of seasons: 3
- No. of episodes: 29

Production
- Executive producers: Anthony Horn; Bill Bracken; Brad Lachman; Jeff Ross; Phil Shalala; Robyn Hutt
- Running time: 42 minutes
- Production company: Genco Entertainment

Original release
- Network: TruTV
- Release: November 11, 2008 – November 16, 2010

Rehab: Party at the Hard Rock Hotel is an American reality television docudrama on TruTV that premiered on November 11, 2008. It focuses on the staff (bartenders, cocktail waitresses, security, etc.) of the Rehab pool party hosted at the Las Vegas Hard Rock Hotel and Casino and also chronicles the staff as they attempt to keep the partygoers under control while trying to do their jobs well and avoid their bosses' anger.

The series ran for 3 seasons until its cancellation in December 2010. Main cast members include Matt Minichino, Julia Velotas, Chantel Corradino and Sharon Meyers

== Cast ==
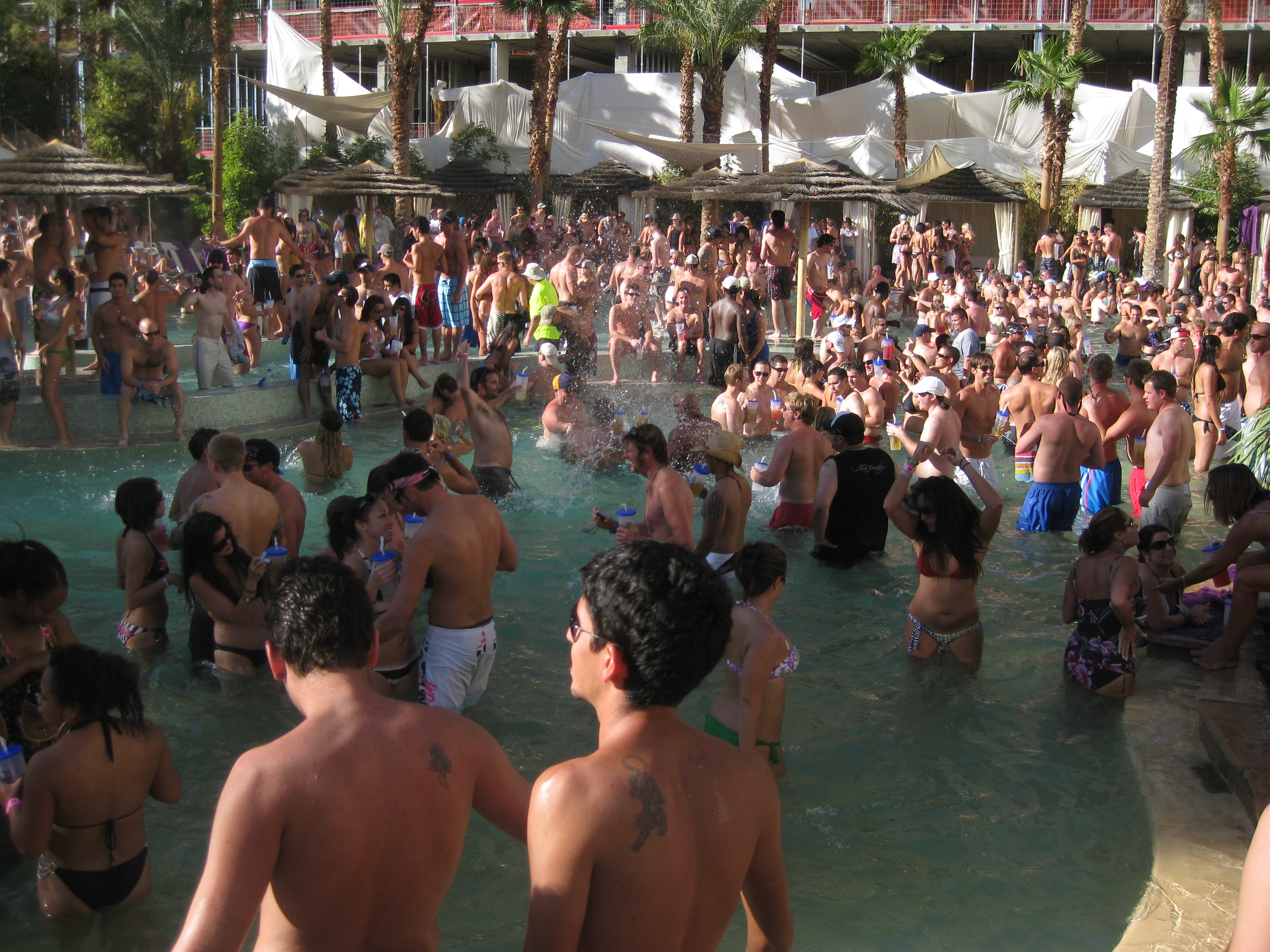
The Rehab party in October 2008

=== Recurring cast ===
- Matthew Minichino — Director of Nightlife
- Sharon Meyers — Special Events Security Supervisor
- Julia Velotas - Lead cocktail server
- Chantel Corradino and Jessica Snook - Bartenders
- Amanda Caldwell and Jonna Mannion — Cocktail Servers
- Jake - Security Officer
- Doug Hayes

== Lawsuit ==
In September 2010 the owner of the Hard Rock brand filed a lawsuit against the company which acquired the rights to the name of the hotel, Morgans Hotel Group, stating that the show has damaged the company name by associating it with "drunken debauchery, acts of vandalism, sexual harassment, (and) violence." Despite the lawsuit, truTV ran the third season. Morgans Hotel Group argued that "This show and the lively behavior it portrays have already been on the air for two years... it has brought enormous popularity to the Hard Rock brand.

== Undercover drug sting ==
In 2010, undercover police officers investigated security officers and VIP hosts who were allegedly selling drugs to guests and allowing (at least on one occasion) an undercover officer to smoke marijuana in a public restroom after bribing a security officer. These stings occurred at the now-closed Body English and Vanity nightclubs also on the Hard Rock Hotel property and featured on the show. Hard Rock Hotel has reportedly fired all employees listed in the complaint, and agreed to pay a $700,000 fine.

== See also ==
- List of television shows set in Las Vegas
