= Rehab (party) =

Pool party event in Nevada, United States

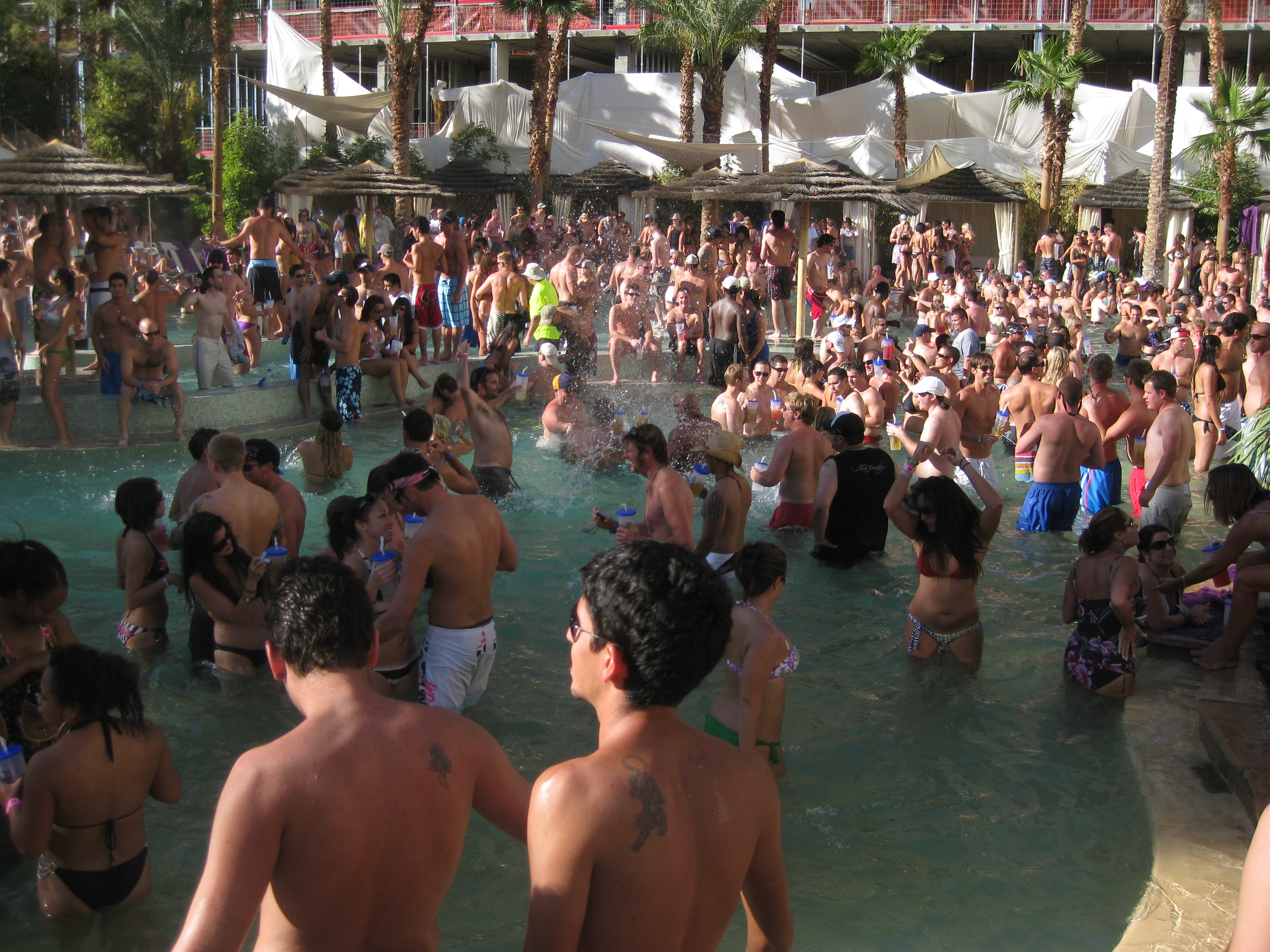
- A Rehab party in 2008
- Frequency: Every Sunday, April through October
- Venue: Hard Rock Hotel
- Locations: Paradise, Nevada
- Coordinates: 36.110014°N 115.154935°W
- Country: United States
- Years active: 2004–2018
- Inaugurated: May 2, 2004
- Most recent: October 14, 2018
- Capacity: 2,000 (as of 2008)
- Website: bikini.rehablv.com

Rehab was a pool party event held from 2004 to 2018, at the Hard Rock Hotel and Casino in Paradise, Nevada, near the Las Vegas Strip. Rehab popularized the pool party concept in Las Vegas, leading other resorts to begin offering their own versions. Its success also spawned a reality television series, Rehab: Party at the Hard Rock Hotel, which aired from 2008 to 2010.

== Description ==
Rehab was similar to a spring break party, and each event featured DJ music. Rehab also featured live performances throughout its history, from musicians such as Akon, Snoop Dogg, Drake, Lil Wayne, Lady Gaga, Deadmau5, Pauly D, and Psy. Aside from the cost of admission, alcohol and cabanas were offered for additional costs. Rehab parties were held on Sundays. The event operated during warm seasons, usually starting in April. It would typically end each year in October, depending on the weather.

== History ==
Before Rehab was launched, the Hard Rock Hotel pool was not open to the public and was only accessible to resort guests. In 2004, Chad Pallas, the director of nightlife for the Hard Rock went to Phil Shalala the CMO who was looking for ways to keep the resort popular. He focused on improving the pool area and got the idea for Rehab after explaining a weekly boat party on Lake Mead. Pallas later said, "It was the greatest time ever to get out there in that cheap pontoon boat and party during the day. I had just come home and was relaxing one day when I got a call from a girl who wanted to get a group of her friends into the resort pool. She said she couldn't just walk in, that they had grown more strict, yet I was going to meetings where we were complaining that pool business was down." The pool area had sometimes hosted private concerts and special events.

Shalala had seen Nikki Beach in Miami, but he was not certain that such an idea could work in Las Vegas, so adjustments were made to the concept to suit the locale. Pallas said about Rehab, "At first we made the mistake of thinking it was more of the electronic [music] scene, but the crowd that came showed us it was more of a Spring Break party scene." Rehab opened to the public on May 2, 2004, and Pallas hoped that the event could bring in revenue of $20,000 on its opening day. The first party proved to be successful, bringing in $90,000, and the event brought in profits of $1.5 million by the end of its first season in 2004. Following its initial success, the event returned the following year.

Rehab was initially popular among local residents, including those who worked in nearby resorts on the Las Vegas Strip. Word about the Rehab parties gradually spread to tourists, and the event pioneered the local trend of daylife (or dayclub) entertainment, similar to nightlife. Celebrity visitors over the years included Rob Gronkowski, Justin Bieber, Paris Hilton, and Kim Kardashian. Rehab's initial success was partly due to the lack of competition. By 2007, its popularity had inspired other Las Vegas resorts to begin offering similar pool party events. By 2008, yearly profits had reached $9 million. Lines would form hours prior to the opening of a Rehab party. As of 2008, the event had capacity for 2,000 people, and lines would sometimes reach into the casino once capacity was hit. VIP customers could skip the line and enter through a separate entrance. Rehab's popularity led to a reality television show titled Rehab: Party at the Hard Rock Hotel, which premiered in 2008. As of 2009, Rehab averaged 2,000 to 2,500 guests during each party, although some busy weekends attracted up to 5,000 people. Cabana rentals ranged from $1,000 to $10,000 depending on how busy each party was.

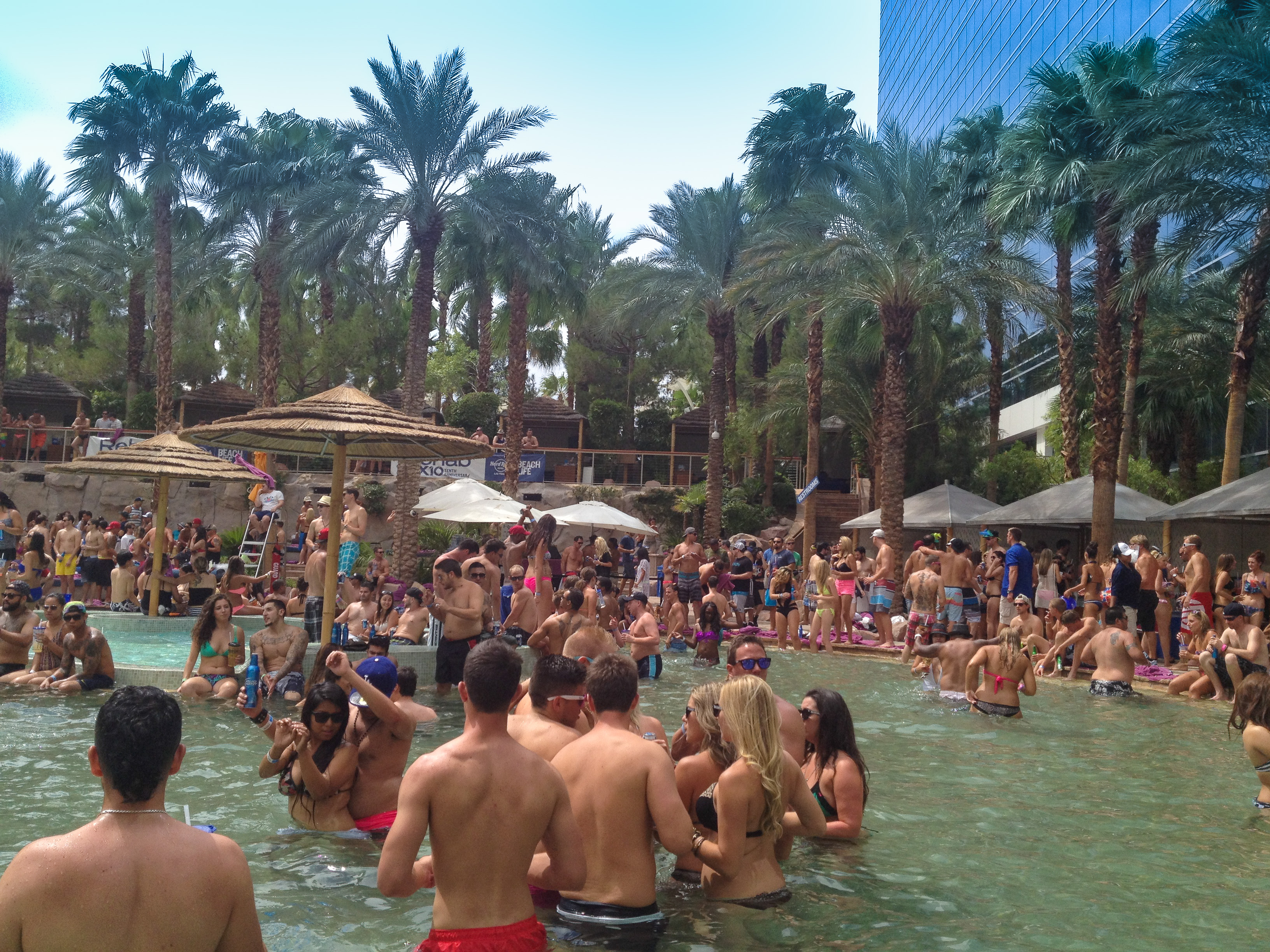
Rehab in 2009

By 2009, drugs and prostitution had become an issue at resort pools in the Las Vegas Valley. That year, detectives with the Las Vegas Metropolitan Police Department launched an undercover operation at Rehab. They subsequently arrested seven people on narcotic-related charges, while another was arrested for solicitation of prostitution. The arrests prompted the Nevada Gaming Control Board to investigate aspects of the pool operation, to determine whether such crimes were commonly occurring on the property.

In 2010, Hard Rock Cafe International sued the Hard Rock Hotel to cancel its name licensing agreement, citing negative publicity associated with Rehab and its reality television series. The lawsuit alleged that the resort was being portrayed on television as "a destination that revels in drunken debauchery, acts of vandalism, sexual harassment, violence, criminality and a host of other behavior". The lawsuit also cited the 2009 arrests. Rehab: Party at the Hard Rock was canceled later in 2010.

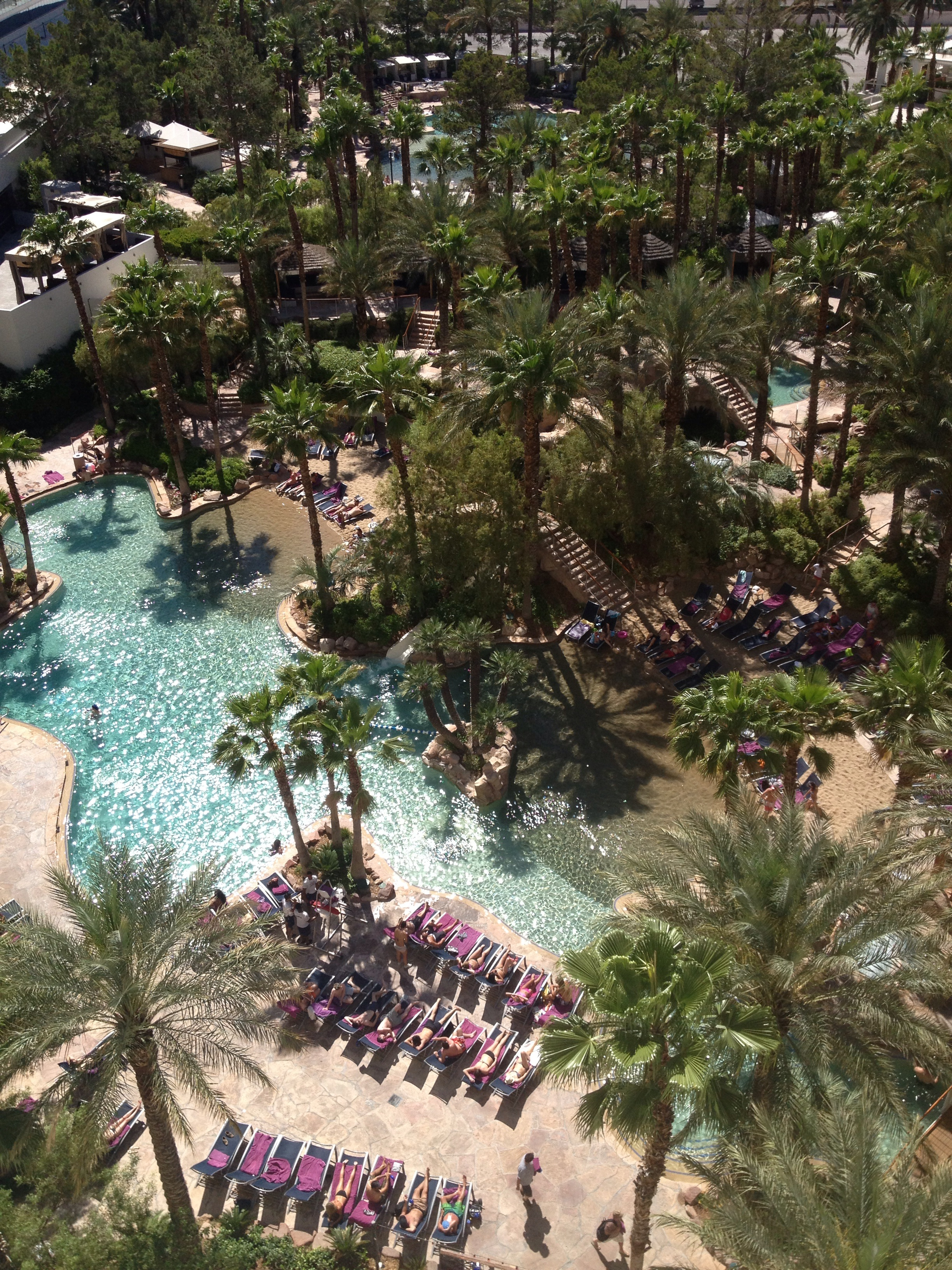
Pool area in 2013

In 2011, Ian Kohoutek became the director of nightlife and launched an effort to help Rehab's public image following the lawsuit. Kohoutek said about the television series, "I think it was a poor depiction of what Rehab is all about. This is actually a very fun, clean environment. We have a clean pool; we operate effectively and by the law." At the time, Rehab offered 22 daybeds and 51 cabanas. Describing the success of Rehab, Kohoutek said, "People want to come out and get some sun by the pool no matter what, but making it a nightclub atmosphere just entices them more. Everybody wants to party and they want to be in the sun while they do it."

Rehab remained popular a decade after its opening. Aside from pool renovations and expansions, the event stayed largely the same over the years, a fact that the Hard Rock Hotel cited as a reason for Rehab's success. In 2013, Rehab hosted a bikini contest called the Bikini Invitational, which became a yearly event at Rehab. New bungalows were added to the event in 2015, followed by a revamped stage in 2016. In June 2018, it was announced that Rehab would come to an end later that year, as new owners prepared to renovate the Hard Rock and rebrand it as Virgin Hotels Las Vegas. Rehab held its final pool party on October 14, 2018.
