= Hard Rock Hotel and Casino (Las Vegas) =

Former off-Strip resort and cafe in Las Vegas

Coordinates: 36°06′31″N 115°09′13″W

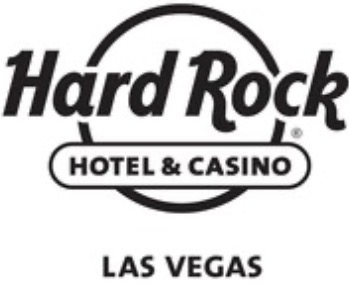

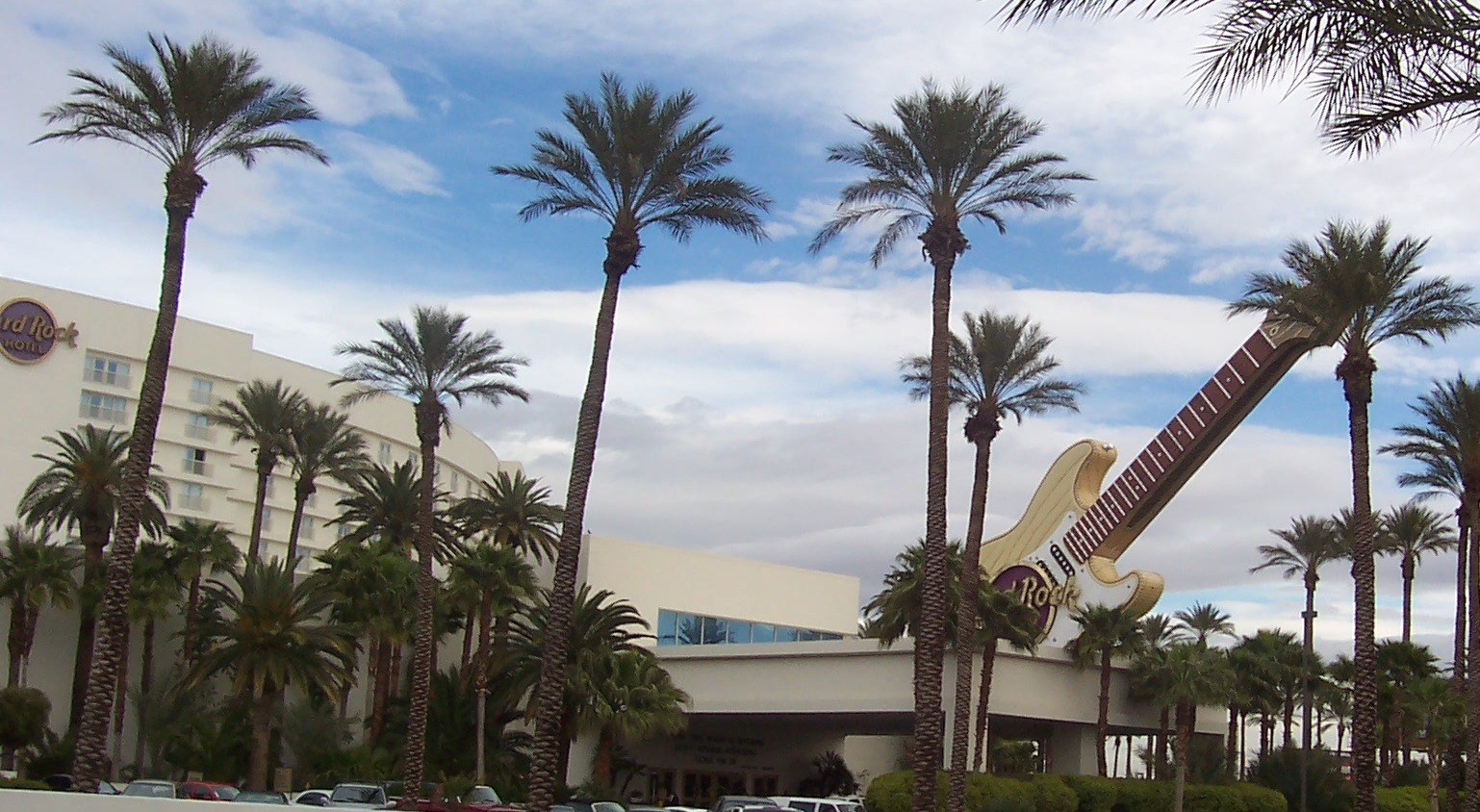
- Exterior view (March 2005)

- Location within Las Vegas Strip
- Interactive map of Hard Rock Hotel and Casino
- Location: Paradise, Nevada; 4455 Paradise Road, 89169
- Opened: March 10, 1995; 31 years ago
- Closed: February 3, 2020; 6 years ago
- Theme: Rock and roll
- No. of rooms: 339 (1995); 670 (1999); 1,506 (after 2009)
- Gaming space: 61,704 square feet (5,732.5 m^{2})
- Permanent shows: Magic Mike Live
- Signature attractions: The Joint; Rehab
- Notable restaurants: Hard Rock Cafe (September 1990 – December 2016); Culinary Dropout; Dunkin' Donuts; Mr. Lucky's 24/7; Nobu; Oyster Bar; Pink Taco; Simon Kitchen & Bar; MB Steak
- Casino type: Land-based
- Owner: List: Harveys (1994–1997); Peter Morton (1994–2007); Morgans Hotel Group and DLJ Merchant Banking Partners (2007–2011); Brookfield Asset Management (2011–2018); Virgin Hotels and others (2018–present)
- Operating license holder: List: Harveys (1995–1997); Peter Morton (1997–2007); Golden Gaming (2007–2008); Morgans Hotel Group (2008–2011); Warner Gaming (2011–2020)
- Renovated in: 1998–1999; 2000–2001; 2007–2010; 2012; 2015–2016

The Hard Rock Hotel & Casino was a resort located near the Las Vegas Strip in Paradise, Nevada, United States. Virgin Hotels Las Vegas opened at the site following renovations, in 2021. The resort is located on 16.7 acres (6.8 ha) on the corner of Harmon Avenue and Paradise Road, about a mile east of the Las Vegas Strip. At the time of its closure, the Hard Rock included 1,506 rooms across several hotel towers, a 61,704-square-foot (5,732.5 m^{2}) casino, and a music venue known as The Joint. It had also hosted a weekly pool party event known as Rehab.

Plans for a Hard Rock hotel were announced in 1991, and the resort opened on March 10, 1995, as the world's first rock and roll-themed hotel. The Hard Rock Hotel & Casino began as a joint venture between Hard Rock Cafe co-founder Peter Morton and Harveys. Following disagreements, Morton bought out Harveys' share of the resort in 1997. A new 11-story hotel tower was added in 1999, as part of a $100 million renovation.

The Hard Rock was featured in various media, including television shows and music videos. It was also a frequent source of controversy and legal problems. In the 2000s, drugs and sexual conduct were common issues at the resort's nightclubs and pool area. The Hard Rock was also criticized for its advertising. The resort catered to a younger demographic, and it began using risqué advertising to compete against the Palms resort, which opened in 2001. However, such advertising led to a complaint from the Nevada Gaming Control Board in 2004. The board alleged that the Hard Rock ads promoted casino cheating and drug use, and a battle ensued over the resort's free-speech rights. The complaint was eventually settled.

In 2004, Morton announced plans to add a $1 billion condo hotel, but this was canceled after he received purchase offers on the Hard Rock. Morgans Hotel Group and DLJ Merchant Banking Partners bought the resort in 2007, and Morgans handled operations. A $750 million renovation and expansion project began in 2007, and was completed three years later. The project added two additional hotel towers, as well as new restaurants and nightclubs.

Morgans ended its involvement with the resort in 2011, when it was sold to Brookfield Asset Management with Warner Gaming as the operator. Virgin Hotels and a group of investors purchased the Hard Rock in 2018 and announced plans to renovate and rebrand it as a Virgin hotel. The Hard Rock closed on February 3, 2020, for renovations. Virgin Hotels Las Vegas opened on March 25, 2021.

== History ==
=== Background ===
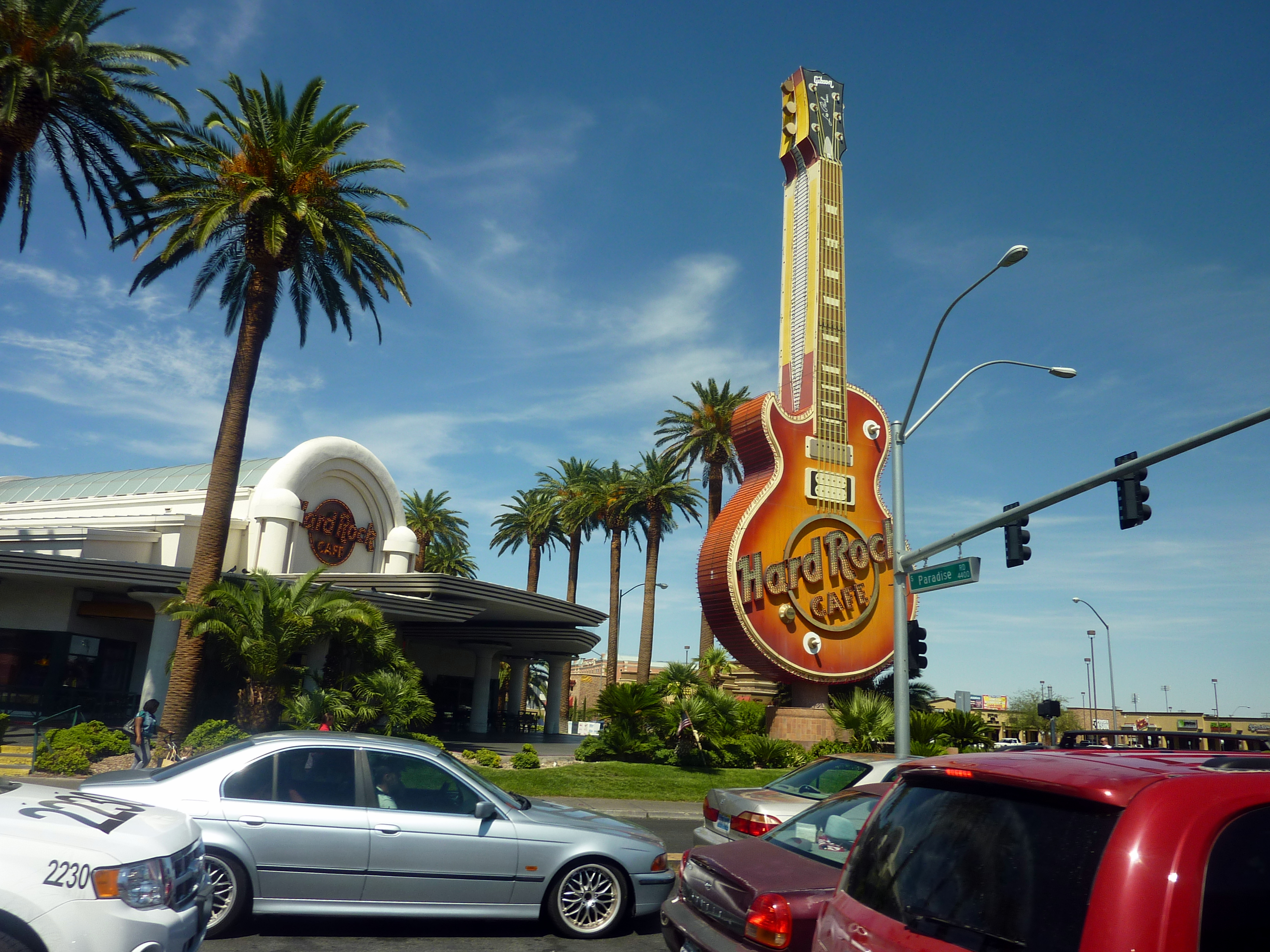
Hard Rock Cafe and guitar sign (September 2012)

Initially, a standalone Hard Rock Cafe opened in September 1990, on the southeast corner of the property that would eventually include the Hard Rock resort. The restaurant entrance featured a 45-foot-tall Gibson Les Paul guitar sign.

=== 1991–1995: Development and opening ===
The Hard Rock casino hotel project was announced on June 5, 1991, as the first such project in the company's history. It would be built beside the restaurant. Company co-founder Peter Morton said, "We did a lot of marketing studies. Everything gave us an extremely strong indication that there are a lot of 30-year-olds in America who go to Bruce Springsteen concerts and like to gamble." Groundbreaking was scheduled for later that year, with a planned opening in late 1992 or early 1993. The casino would be developed and managed by Harrah's Casino Hotels, the gaming subsidiary of Promus Companies. Plans to build the project with Harrah's were later abandoned.

In September 1993, Hard Rock announced a partnership with the Lake Tahoe-based Harvey's Hotel & Casino. They formed a new corporation and planned to begin construction of the Hard Rock casino hotel later that year for an opening in December 1994. Harvey's (Note: Also spelled "Harveys") had previously made an attempt to purchase the Bally's resort in Reno, Nevada, in 1992. Harveys' banker had also been working separately on the original Hard Rock deal between Morton and Harrah's. When the latter deal also did not work out, the banker brought Morton and Harveys together to partner on the Hard Rock project. Harveys arranged the project's financing through a consortium of six banks led by First Interstate Bank of Nevada. Morton was a majority shareholder in the project, with a 60% interest. Harvey's held the remaining 40% and also managed the property, including the casino, with a contract that was to last until March 1998. The property for the eventual resort was co-owned by Paul Lowden of Santa Fe Gaming, and the land was sold to the Hard Rock developers in 1994. A groundbreaking ceremony took place on February 23, 1994. Attendees included Nevada governor Bob Miller and singers B.B. King, Eddie Van Halen, Chris Isaak, and Robin Wilson. The opening was on track for December 1994. The Hard Rock was built at 4455 Paradise Road, at a cost of $90 million.

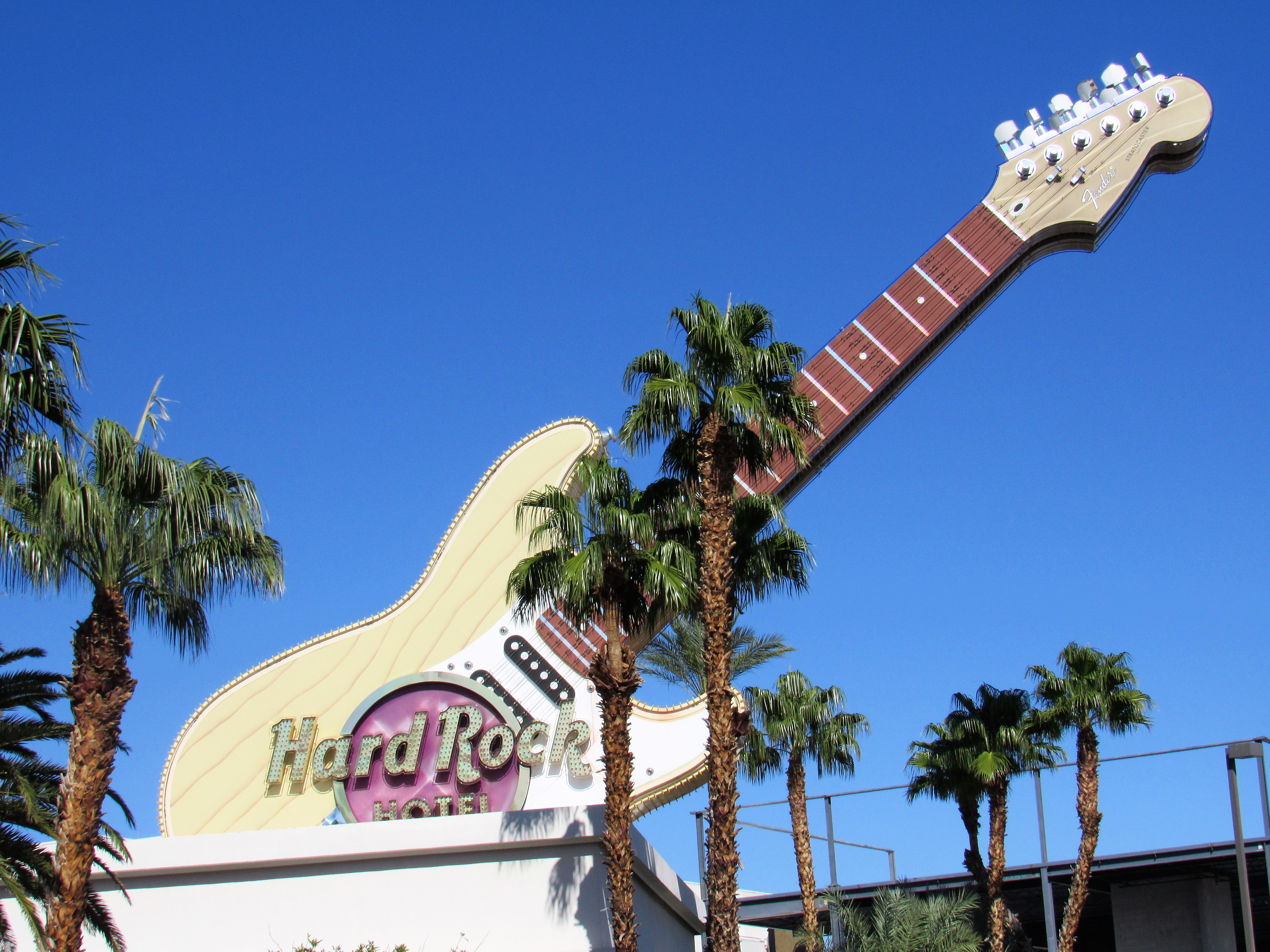
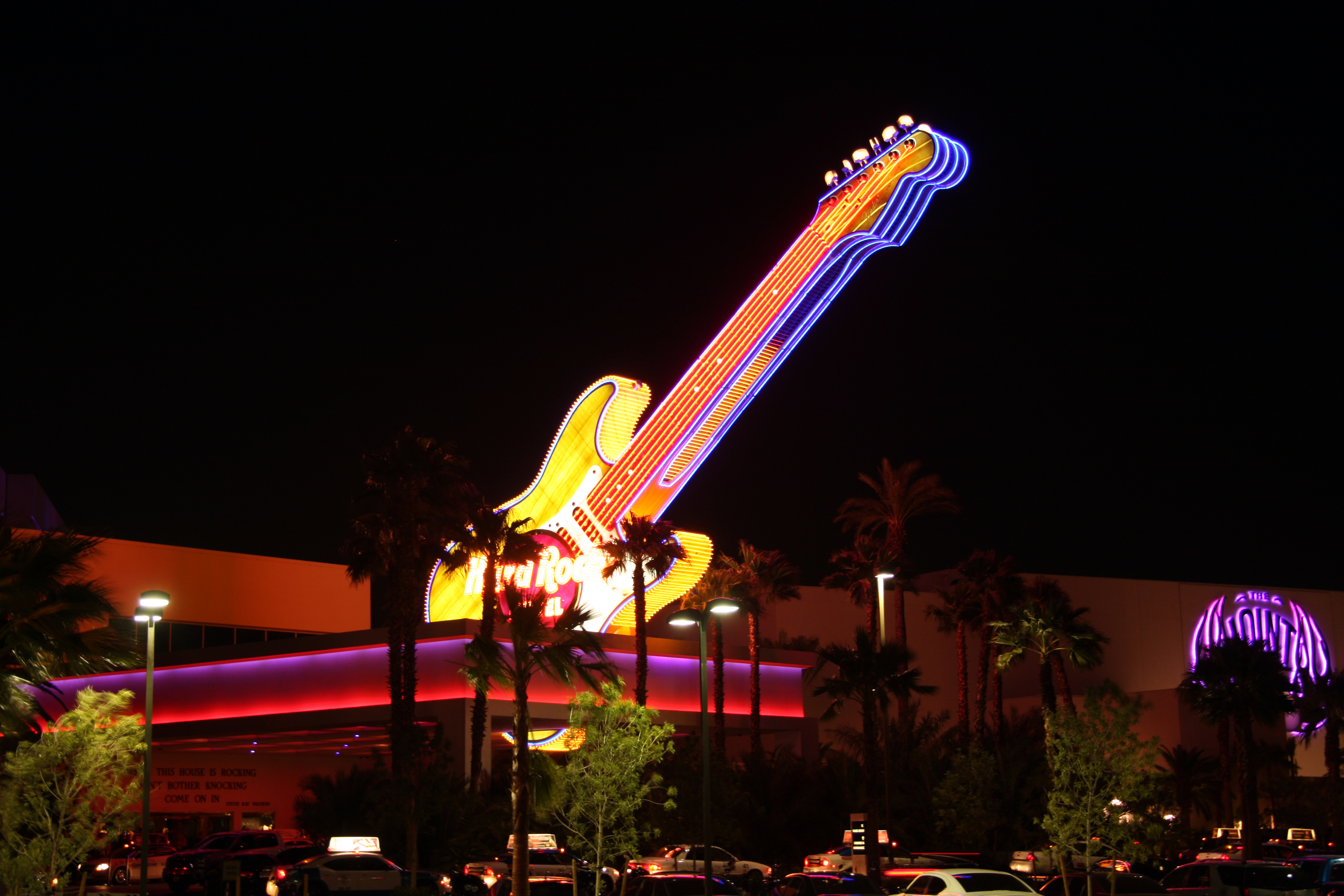
Guitar sign at the Hard Rock Hotel

The Hard Rock Hotel ultimately opened on the night of March 10, 1995, with a grand opening event attended by various celebrities. The resort included a 28,000 sq ft (2,600 m^{2}) casino and an 11-story hotel with 339 rooms. The Hard Rock was small compared to megaresorts located on the nearby Las Vegas Strip. Morton disliked the emerging trend of megaresorts in Las Vegas and described the Hard Rock as a smaller alternative. Approximately 12,500 people applied for jobs at the new resort, and 950 were selected to staff it. The resort intended to target the Generation X demographic. It was the world's first rock and roll-themed hotel, and the grand opening included performances by Al Green, Sheryl Crow, and the Eagles. The Joint was the Hard Rock's 1,200-seat concert venue, which held rock concerts. Aside from the guitar sign at the nearby cafe, the resort had its own giant guitar located atop the porte-cochère. It was the world's largest Fender Stratocaster guitar. Danny Way later performed a skateboarding stunt in which he dropped onto a ramp from a platform positioned near the top of the guitar sign.

The property had environmentally friendly features, including low-flow toilets, biodegradable cleaning products used by housekeepers, laundry and pool water recycled for irrigation, automatic shut-off valves on each of the public faucets, recycle bins located throughout the resort, and the donation of leftover food to charities. In addition, the earnings from certain slot machines were donated to environmental organizations such as Conservation International and Rainforest Foundation. T-shirts featuring the Hard Rock logo were sold at the resort and proved to be popular. In its first year of operation, the Hard Rock earned more revenue from the T-shirts than its hotel rooms.

=== Early years ===
A planned 350-room expansion was on hold as of October 1996, due to disagreements between Morton and executives of Harvey's Casino Resorts. The disagreements related to the management of the Hard Rock, the timetable for expanding the resort, and the marketing of the property. Morton had purchased an option that year to buy an adjacent parcel occupied by Las Vegas Discount Golf & Tennis, which would be replaced by the intended expansion of the Hard Rock. However, Morton reportedly did not want to approve the expansion while he was in the process of extending Harveys' management contract. Morton later said that Harveys did not want to proceed with the expansion because of differences with him.

=== Morton ownership ===
In mid-1997, it was announced that Morton would purchase Harveys' share of the resort for $45 million. The deal included paying Harveys $24.2 million to end the managing agreement, and another $20.7 million to buy Harveys' stake in Hard Rock Hotel common stock. At the time, the resort was considered overwhelmingly successful. The sale was approved by the Nevada Gaming Control Board and the Nevada Gaming Commission in October 1997. The purchase increased Morton's ownership to 90 percent, while the remainder was held by investors such as film producer Jon Avnet and MTV chairman Tom Freston. That month, Morton had plans for an expansion that would include a new hotel tower, a six-story parking garage, a health spa, and an enlargement of the Hard Rock Beach Club. Morton also planned to add four new restaurants, as hotel guests would frequently get tired of the limited dining options and would often leave the premises to eat elsewhere. Morton said the casino, which had 800 slot machines, would perform better with new restaurants and additional rooms. Morton purchased the land owned by Las Vegas Discount Golf & Tennis for $8.5 million, and the sale increased the Hard Rock's total property size to more than 18 acres. The $85 million expansion was expected to begin in early 1998.

The new 11-story hotel tower opened on May 10, 1999, with 330 rooms for a total of 670. The expansion cost a final total of $100 million, and included 35 suites, four new restaurants, the Baby's nightclub, 6,000 sq ft (560 m^{2}) of meeting space, and a bigger pool. Morton had county approval to add another 350-room tower, but he felt that such an addition would hamper the Hard Rock's boutique hotel nature: "I think if we grew this much larger ... it would definitely lose that intimacy and that ability to make the product personal." Morton said the Hard Rock's limited size was inspired by Las Vegas hotels of the 1950s, which were smaller than the newer megaresorts that had become common on the Las Vegas Strip. The expansion also included the Hard Rock Athletic Club and RockSpa. A two-day celebration was held to showcase the expansion, which brought increased revenue.

The Hard Rock hosted its first boxing match in August 1999, between David Reid and Keith Mullings. That month, the Hard Rock laid off approximately 75 employees, reportedly because Morton was disappointed with the resort's financial results following the expansion. However, Morton said the resort was performing well. In late 1999, Morton invested an additional $28 million in the Hard Rock. A new general manager, Rick Richards, was named in August 2000.

In late 2000, the Hard Rock began a one-year, $8 million renovation of the 339 rooms in the original hotel tower. The Palms resort opened in Las Vegas in 2001, and it competed with the Hard Rock, where the targeted clientele consisted of young adults. The Hard Rock tried to stay competitive by paying for top-dollar musicians such as The Rolling Stones and Ozzy Osbourne. Howard Stern also hosted his radio show at the Hard Rock on several occasions, from 2001 to 2004. (Note: Refer to the following sources for 2001, 2002, 2003, and 2004.) Richards resigned his position as general manager in September 2001, and the hotel was subsequently operated by a committee of executives until the following year. Another new general manager, Don Marrandino, was named in early 2002, becoming at least the fifth person to hold the position since the Hard Rock's opening. Morton had a reputation for being a perfectionist who was difficult to please. During the second quarter of 2002, the Hard Rock spent $600,000 on entertainment and marketing expenses, including a national advertising campaign. The expenses brought increased revenue, and the resort had plans to eventually add extra banquet space, several new high roller suites, and a few additional floors in the parking garage.

John Entwistle, the bassist for The Who, died of a heart attack in a suite at the Hard Rock on June 27, 2002. Entwistle and the band were scheduled to perform at the Joint the next day to kick off a North American tour. The hotel declined to publicly identify the number of the room where Entwistle died, and it turned down dozens of requests from people wanting to stay in the room days after his death. The room was made available again four days later, although the hotel still withheld its location. It was later revealed to be room number 658.

The Hard Rock refinanced its bonds in May 2003, raising approximately $25 million for expansion work over the next two years. A parking garage expansion began in 2003, after years of consideration. The expansion cost $4 million and it increased the six-story garage to eight stories. The expanded garage would alleviate past issues regarding a lack of parking, as concert-goers at the Joint would frequently occupy most of the resort's parking for prolonged periods of time. There were also plans to expand the convention and meeting space, but not the hotel. The resort's chief financial officer said it was unlikely that the hotel would ever exceed 800 rooms, because of a desire to maintain the resort's small scale and because of lack of space. The garage expansion was completed in January 2004, and added 280 new parking spaces. Construction on additional meeting space was delayed while hotel officials evaluated whether to add a new hotel tower, which would be built simultaneously with the meeting facility.

An email marketing campaign was launched in December 2003, targeting 250,000 Hard Rock subscribers. The goal of the campaign was to have customers reserve rooms directly with the resort, bypassing online bookers. The first two days of the campaign produced the highest number of direct reservations in the hotel's history. In 2004, a multimillion-dollar marketing campaign was being planned to promote the resort's image as a party environment, with young adults as the target demographic. The Hard Rock launched a second, successful email marketing campaign later that year.

==== Residential project ====
In July 2004, the Hard Rock was considering a purchase of 23 acres (9.3 ha) located directly west of the resort. The property was occupied by the Paradise Bay Club apartments, with nearly 550 units. The land would be used for an expansion of the Hard Rock. Morton purchased the adjacent property in September 2004, at a cost of $86 million. That month, Morton announced plans for a $1 billion condo hotel addition, consisting of four towers with a total of at least 1,500 units, to be built on the newly acquired property. At the time, Las Vegas was experiencing a condominium boom. Morton described the new project as a chance for people to own "a little piece of the Hard Rock." Other features in the project would include restaurants, retail shops, nightclubs, and a health spa. Construction was expected to begin in 2005, with completion of the first phase in 2006.

In March 2005, early planning work was underway on the proposed expansion, which was scheduled to open in mid-2007. Part of the expansion would include a relocated and expanded version of the Joint that would also open in 2007, while the original Joint would be demolished, to make room for new casino space. Supermodel Claudia Schiffer and her husband Matthew Vaughn purchased a $2.5 million suite in one of the planned towers.

The Hard Rock celebrated its 10th anniversary on April 30, 2005, with concerts by Nine Inch Nails and Bon Jovi. Various celebrity guests were also in attendance at the resort for its anniversary. The late celebration was timed to coincide with the opening weekend of the Wynn resort on the Las Vegas Strip. During the weekend celebration, Morton unveiled further details about the proposed residential expansion, which was unanimously approved by the county in May 2005.

By October 2005, the Hard Rock had secured a $1.25 billion loan from Credit Suisse First Boston for the intended expansion. The project was expected to begin construction later in the year and would consist of three elements: The Residences, a luxury condominium property with 372 units spread across three high-rise towers; The Flats, an 800-room condo hotel; and The Bungalows, consisting of 36 private beachside villas. By the end of 2005, the proposed residential project had reached $800 million in advance sales.

Morton announced the postponement of the residential project on February 23, 2006, stating that he had received offers to sell the Hard Rock to new owners. The sale would include the 23 acres intended for the expansion, which Morton delayed as it was unclear what the new buyers would want to do with the property. In addition, Morton's prospective partner had pulled out of the residential project, which was ultimately cancelled. Construction had been expected to begin in 2006, with completion in 2008. Morton's sudden announcement of the sale was unexpected for many of the resort's employees. MGM Mirage considered purchasing the resort and the Hard Rock Cafe. The Rank Group, which owned the Hard Rock Cafe chain, also considered purchasing the Hard Rock Hotel.

=== Morgans/DLJ ownership ===
On May 11, 2006, Morton announced that he would sell the Hard Rock and the 23 acres (9.3 ha) to Morgans Hotel Group for $770 million. Morton believed it was the right time to sell, saying he was pleased with the offer price and that, "I just sort of felt there came a point in my life where I wanted to do more with my life and re-evaluate things. I want to do some different things." As part of the deal, Morgans retained the rights to use the "Hard Rock" name for hotels and casinos in the Western United States and certain other territories. Morgans planned to raise the resort's hotel room rates to increase revenue, and intended to appeal to a more affluent clientele who would also spend money on the resort's gaming and restaurants. Morgans did not have any immediate or specific plans for the vacant property adjacent to the Hard Rock.

Analysts and investors were initially skeptical about Morgans' financial ability to purchase the Hard Rock, as the company was a boutique hotel operator with only eight properties. In November 2006, Morgans announced that it had signed an agreement with Credit Suisse's DLJ Merchant Banking Partners to help finance its purchase of the Hard Rock. Through the deal, the two companies would form a joint venture, Hard Rock Holdings, which would own the resort. DLJ and its affiliates would invest up to $250 million in Hard Rock Holdings.

The Hard Rock Hotel was Morgans' first casino venture. Morgans announced that Golden Gaming would temporarily operate the casino, until Morgans received its own gaming license, a process that was expected to take about a year. Golden Gaming was approved as the interim casino operator by Nevada gaming regulators in January 2007. Golden Gaming would receive a management fee to operate the casino and could share part of the gaming revenue after expenses. The balance of any revenue from the casino would be placed in an escrow account which would go to Morgans once it became licensed to operate the casino. In addition, around 520 of the Hard Rock's employees would be loaned to Golden Gaming for the casino operations. The deal was described by gaming regulators as being somewhat uncommon.

The $770 million purchase of the Hard Rock was completed on February 2, 2007, after nearly nine months. DLJ invested $100 million to help fund the purchase of the Hard Rock, gaining a two-thirds investment in the resort. Morgans contributed $50 million to $60 million for a one-third stake, and also operated the non-gaming areas of the resort. The resort's environmental efforts were continued under the new ownership.

==== Renovation ====
Details for a $750 million expansion and renovation project were unveiled in March 2007. The project would double the size of the resort with additional hotel rooms, convention space, and a larger concert venue. The hotel expansion would consist of a 15-story tower with 550 rooms and a separate VIP tower with 400 suites. The expansion was scheduled to begin construction in October 2007 for completion in mid-2009, although renovations to the existing hotel rooms and restaurants began immediately. The Hard Rock remained open during the renovation project. NRFC HRH, an entity of NorthStar Realty Finance Corporation, provided $100 million as part of a $1.36 billion loan that was used to finance the 2007 purchase and the subsequent renovation and expansion.

New York architect Mark Zeff designed the property's existing and future facilities. Zeff wanted to give the resort an "elegant, young vibe." A renovation of the hotel's 64 suites, located on the hotel's 11th floor, began in June 2007. Zeff had four different redesigns which were implemented into the suites as a way of gauging how customers react to them, ahead of construction for the new hotel towers. The new towers were intended to target boutique hotel customers who visit the Hard Rock but may stay at more upscale hotels on the Las Vegas Strip. The Hard Rock performed better than expected in the first full quarter of its new ownership.

As part of the expansion, the Paradise Bay Club apartments would be closed and demolished. The apartments would be replaced by new parking for employees and guests, and the land would also serve as a temporary staging area for construction. The expansion would ultimately utilize only eight of the 23 acres (9.3 ha), and the remaining acreage would be left vacant with the future possibility of development. Meanwhile, the parking lot located in front of the resort along Paradise Road would be replaced by 60,000 sq ft (5,600 m^{2}) of convention and meeting space, as well as the new and enlarged Joint. The original Joint, capable of holding 2,000 people during concerts, would be opened up to make room for 35,000 sq ft (3,300 m^{2}) of new casino space, for a new total of 65,000 sq ft (6,000 m^{2}). The new Joint was built on what used to be 300 parking spaces. The Paradise Bay Club apartments were closed in July 2007, and demolition was underway the following month. A groundbreaking ceremony had been planned for August 7, 2007, but was postponed as hotel officials wanted to wait a few months for a backdrop that would be more photogenic. In addition to a parking garage, the former apartment land would also be used for the new hotel towers.

Morgans was licensed to operate the casino in January 2008, ending its agreement with Golden Gaming. Renovations on the upper-floor suites were finished, while lower-floor suites were in the process of being upgraded. The resort initially performed well, despite the presence of construction vehicles and disruptions caused by the renovation work. To prevent traffic problems, much of the construction work was ended each day around 12:30 p.m. By June 2008, construction was underway on the new, northern hotel tower, which had reached the fourth floor. Later that year, construction began on the south tower.

During the Great Recession in 2008, Morgans Hotel Group began gradually reducing its equity in the Hard Rock joint venture, and the resort suffered financially as a result of the recession. As of August 2008, Morgans held a 20% stake in the resort. The Hard Rock took advantage of the recession by hiring skilled construction workers who otherwise would have been busy working on other projects, if not for the economic slowdown. Construction proceeded ahead of schedule, with 1,600 workers and M.J. Dean as the general contractor. The company had worked on a previous expansion of the Hard Rock as well. Later in 2008, the Hard Rock experienced its largest quarterly revenue drop under its new ownership. The poor revenue was attributed to decreased consumer spending as well as disruptions caused by the ongoing expansion work.

The 17-story north tower, with 479 rooms, was topped off on October 24, 2008. The 15-story south tower was topped off on February 6, 2009, and approximately 65,000 sq ft (6,000 m^{2}) of meeting space was added. In May 2009, Morgans announced that due to declining revenue caused by the recession, it would reduce its ownership stake to 14 percent by the end of the year. Despite decreased revenue, plans remained on track to open the new hotel towers, which had already been fully financed. The Hard Rock planned to hire 1,200 people to operate the new additions to the resort. This would include 800 employees who would be split between the two new hotel towers. More than 3,800 people interviewed for the 800 available job positions.

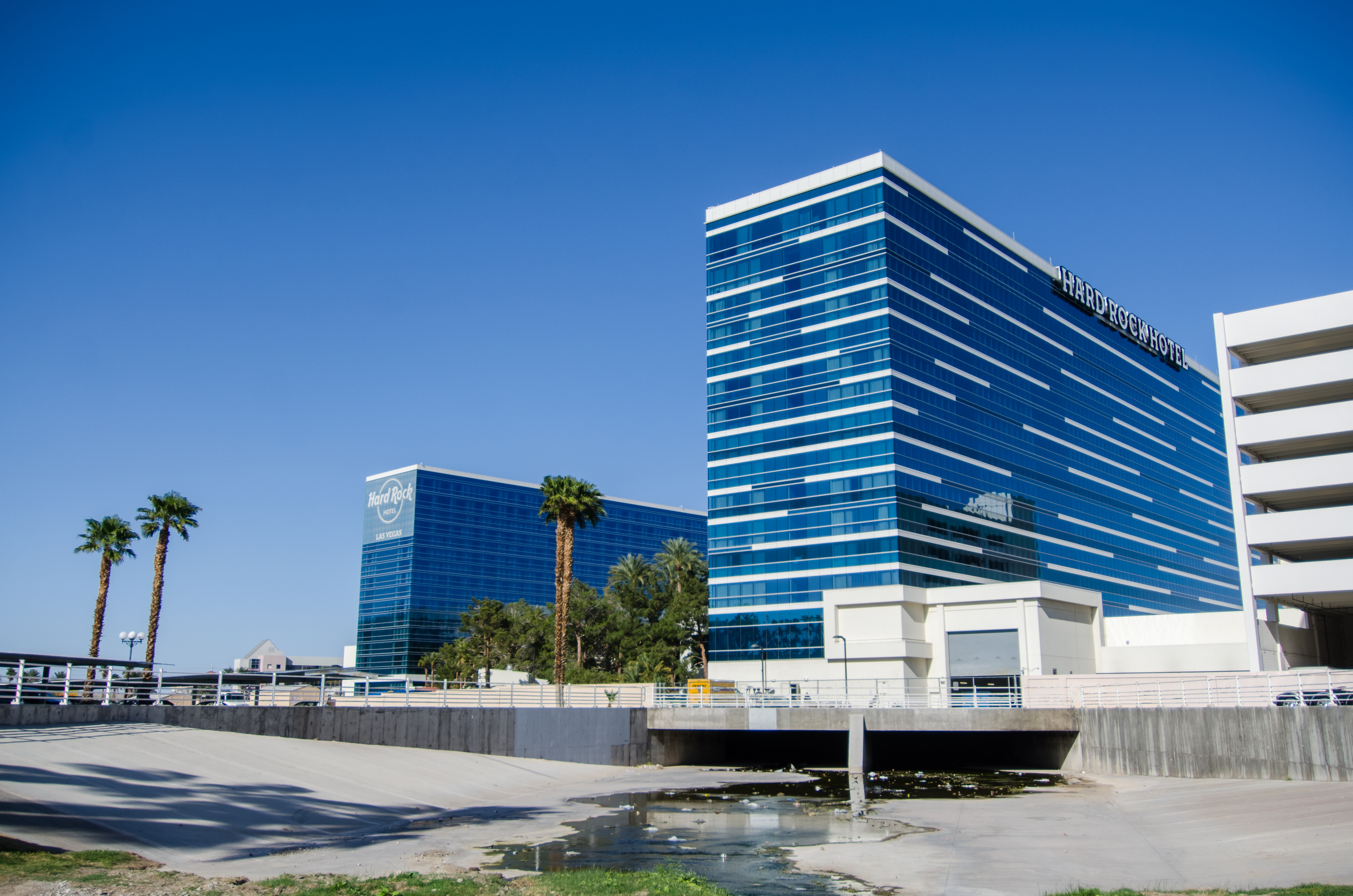
The Paradise Tower (left) and HRH Tower

The Paradise Tower, located on the north portion of the property, opened ahead of schedule in July 2009. Despite the recession, the hotel was performing well because of the new Joint and convention space, and the additional rooms were considered a necessity. The tower opened with 479 rooms, while 10 suites and a penthouse would be finished the following month.

In August 2009, the Hard Rock Hotel was in discussions with its lenders to delay the upcoming maturity date on its $1 billion loan, from February 2010 to February 2014. The extension was granted at the end of 2009. The south hotel tower, the HRH Tower, opened on December 28, 2009. With the towers complete, the Hard Rock Hotel had a new total of 1,506 rooms. The original hotel towers, which are connected, became known as the Casino Tower. The $750 million renovation and expansion project was completed in 2010, and the resort had approximately 2,800 employees. Additional restaurants and nightclubs were among the new features added during the expansion.

==== Final year ====
In March 2010, the resort's chief operating officer of three years, Randy Kwasniewski, committed suicide in his Las Vegas home. Fred Kleisner, the chief executive officer of Morgans, took over the position temporarily. A permanent replacement was announced in June 2010, after a dozen potential candidates from around the world had been interviewed for the job. The Hard Rock continued to experience financial difficulties during 2010, and the resort ultimately turned out to be a costly investment for Morgans and DLJ.

In February 2011, NorthStar filed a notice of foreclosure against the resort regarding its earlier $100 million loan. The dispute related to an alleged agreement that the Hard Rock made to rent out its entertainment venues, which NorthStar claimed to be a violation of the loan provisions. The Hard Rock filed a lawsuit against NorthStar, claiming that the latter had no right to foreclose on the resort. The Hard Rock's lawsuit also alleged that the foreclosure process was being rushed. NorthStar subsequently stated that the resort missed a monthly loan payment of $460,000 that was due at the beginning of the month, with $96.2 million still owed in total.

NorthStar contacted 160 prospective buyers, and planned to have Navegante Group operate the resort in the event of foreclosure. A public foreclosure auction of the resort was scheduled for February 2011, but it was cancelled after NorthStar and the Hard Rock came to an agreement. The deal would give the Hard Rock until the end of the month to continue negotiations with NorthStar.

=== Brookfield ownership ===
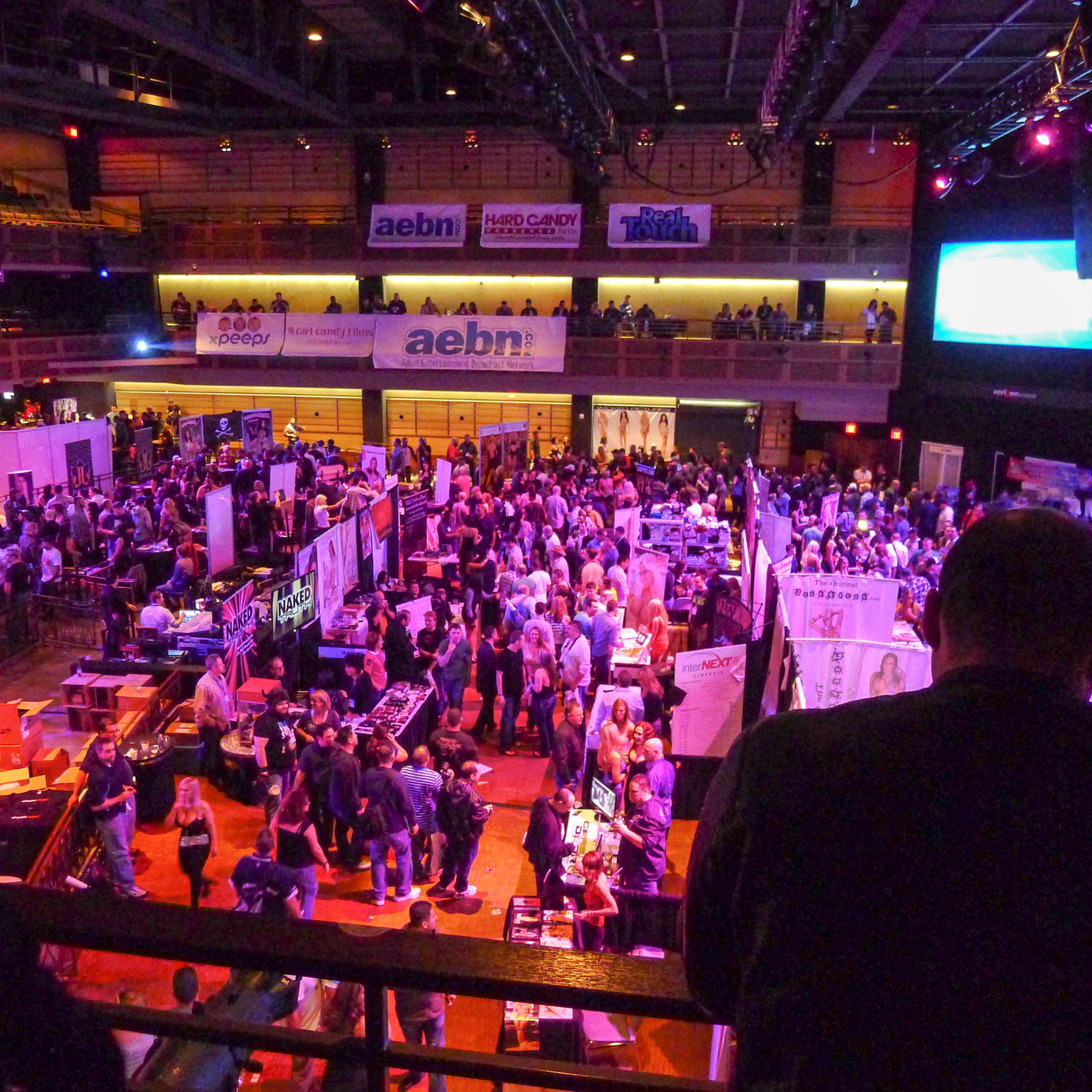
The AVN expo in 2012

In late February 2011, Nevada regulators approved a plan for the Las Vegas-based Warner Gaming to take over operations of the resort from Morgans Hotel Group. Through the deal, Hard Rock Hotel lender Brookfield Asset Management would also invest additional capital in the resort and take over the stake held by Morgans. The deal was finalized in March 2011, and the debt was restructured to approximately $897 million. Brookfield's purchase included the property occupied by the adjacent Hard Rock Cafe, but the restaurant itself remained under the ownership of Hard Rock International. The Hard Rock Hotel experienced another year of financial loss in 2011, because of the poor local economy and new competition from the Cosmopolitan of Las Vegas, which targeted the same demographic of young, hip people. However, financial losses for the year were not as bad as 2010.

In 2012, the Hard Rock began hosting the annual AVN Adult Entertainment Expo, which would return to the resort each subsequent year. In 2012, Brookfield and Warner Gaming were nearing completion on various renovations, including a new restaurant, the Vinyl music venue, and additional gaming space. The project cost between $20-$30 million. The Hard Rock regained an interest among people between the ages of 25 and 40. The increase in this demographic was attributed to the AVN expo, a Mötley Crüe mini residency at the Joint, and the resort's hosting of the Dew Tour. Actor Ben Affleck, a longtime gambler at the Hard Rock, was permanently banned from the casino's blackjack tables in May 2014, on suspicions of card counting.

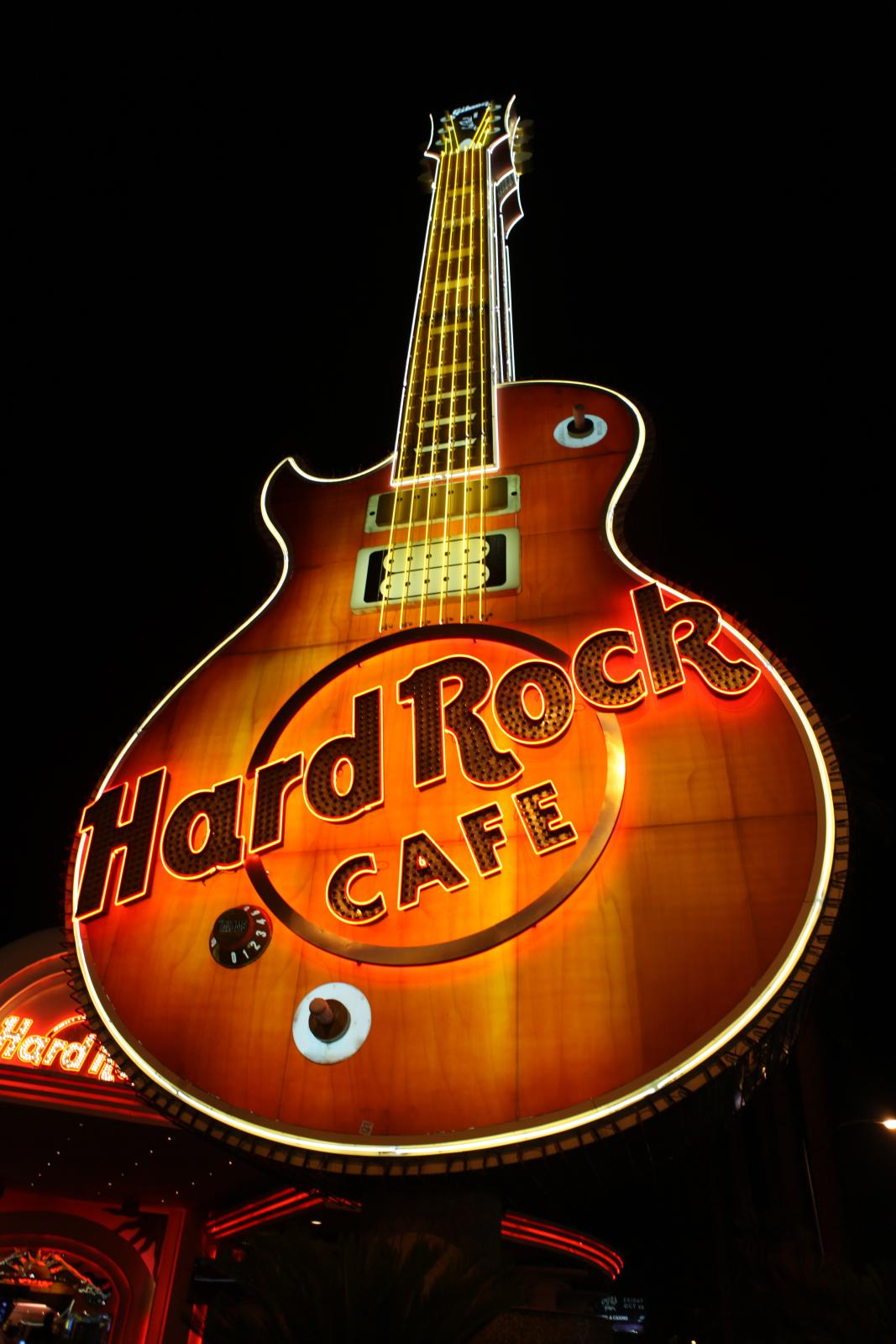
Hard Rock Cafe guitar sign in 2013

The casino's Center Bar closed in June 2015, for remodeling. The circular-shaped bar was built in the center of the casino and was opened in 1995, with the rest of the resort. The Center Bar had been popular among celebrities and local residents, but it was also largely unchanged since its opening, prompting the renovation project. The expanded Center Bar opened several months later, and it subsequently began hosting DJs.

Although the Joint was built as a music venue, it was also frequently being used as convention space, with groups often competing for the venue. At the suggestion of convention clients, the Hard Rock began construction on additional convention space in October 2015. The expansion was built on a Hard Rock parking lot located along Paradise Road. The addition was topped off in May 2016, and it was finished by 2017, adding 19,000 sq ft (1,800 m^{2}). A renovation was also completed on 575 rooms in the Casino Tower, and the resort added a large hair salon as well.

The Hard Rock Cafe closed permanently on December 31, 2016, as Hard Rock International wanted to focus efforts on its newer location at the nearby Showcase Mall. The café sat vacant for several years, and its Gibson Les Paul guitar sign was disassembled in October 2017. YESCO had built the sign and rented it to Hard Rock International while the restaurant was in operation. The sign was refurbished and put on display at the city's Neon Museum in 2019.

In early 2018, construction was underway on a 700-seat venue to host The Voice: Neon Dreams, a live stage show scheduled to open later that year. Base Entertainment was constructing the facility on land adjacent to the café.

=== 2018 sale and Virgin rebranding ===
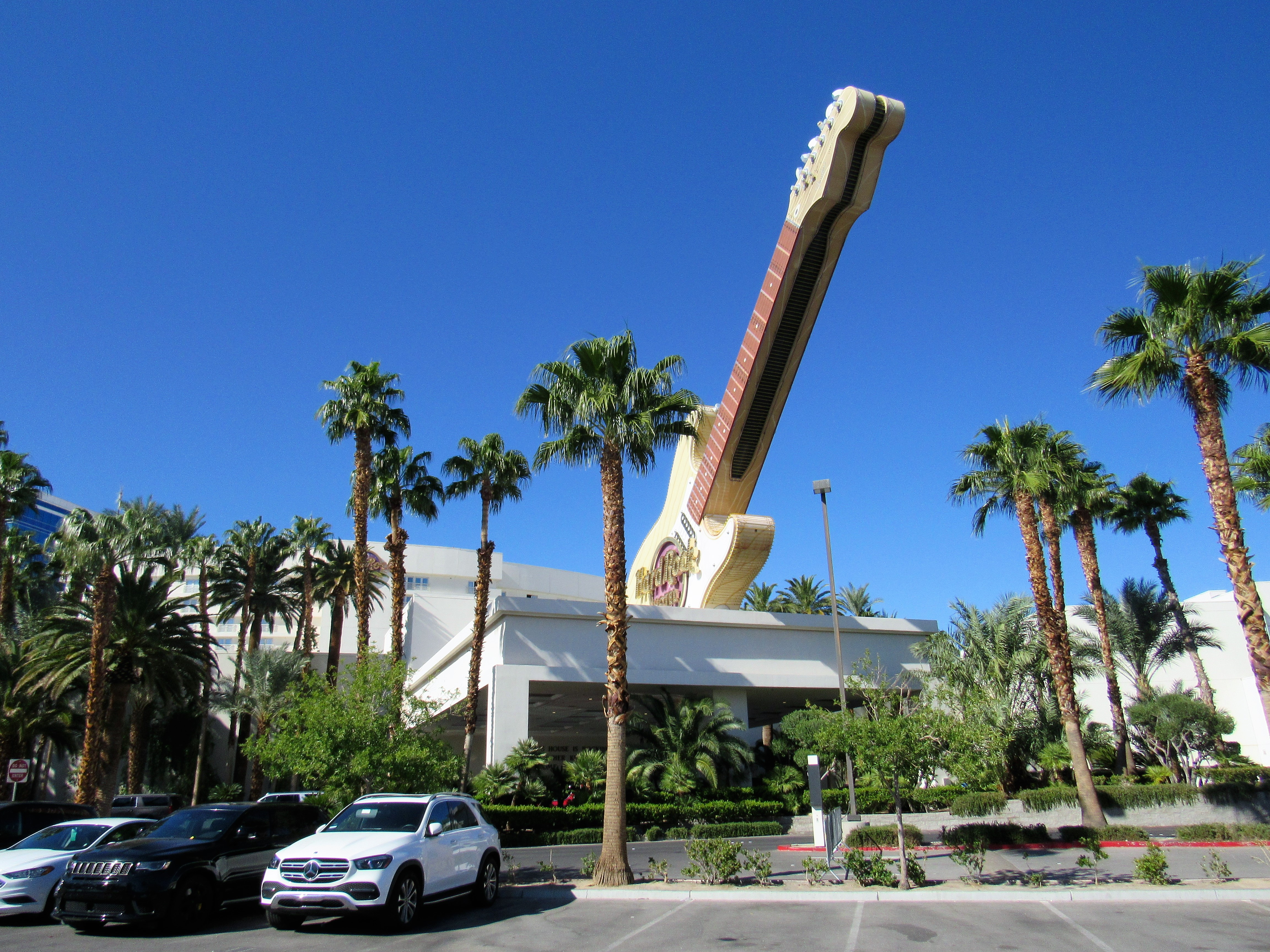
Hard Rock Hotel & Casino in October 2019

In March 2018, the Hard Rock was purchased by Virgin Hotels in partnership with a group of investment firms. JC Hospitality became the majority owner of the resort. At the time of the sale, plans were announced to renovate the property and rebrand it as Virgin Hotels Las Vegas by late 2019, later delayed to 2020. Following the purchase, Base Entertainment pulled out of the plans for The Voice: Neon Dreams, leaving the facility only partially built.

It was announced in August 2019 that the Hard Rock would close for approximately eight months beginning in early February 2020, to allow for the renovations to take place. Initially, the resort was to remain partially open during renovations, but it was determined that a full closure would be more efficient. As part of the Virgin project, the Hard Rock Cafe was demolished in November 2019, making room for landscaping, additional valet parking, and vehicle for hire companies.

The Hard Rock Hotel closed on February 3, 2020. Casino operations began shutting down around 1:00 a.m., and the resort was fully closed at 6:00 p.m. with a brief ceremony in which the entrance doors were chained shut. A four-day celebration, The Last Great Party, was held in the days leading up to the Hard Rock's closure. The celebration included free live music, discounted food and drinks, and a chance for guests to win memorabilia. A Super Bowl LIV party was also held at the resort. The Hard Rock's hotel furniture was sold to the public. Approximately 14,000 people had worked at the Hard Rock over the course of its history. At the time of its closure, the Hard Rock had 1,850 employees, who had the option of returning to their original jobs once the property reopens. By March 2020, the hotel's guitar sign had been disassembled and was in the process of being sold to an interested buyer. Virgin Hotels Las Vegas eventually opened on March 25, 2021, after several delays.

== Music theme and memorabilia ==
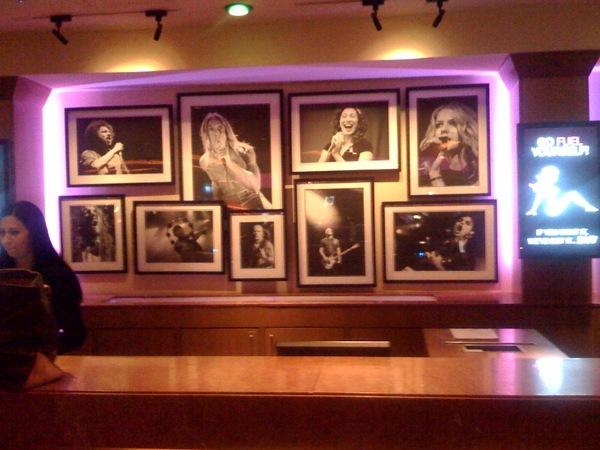
Hotel desk, featuring pictures of musicians

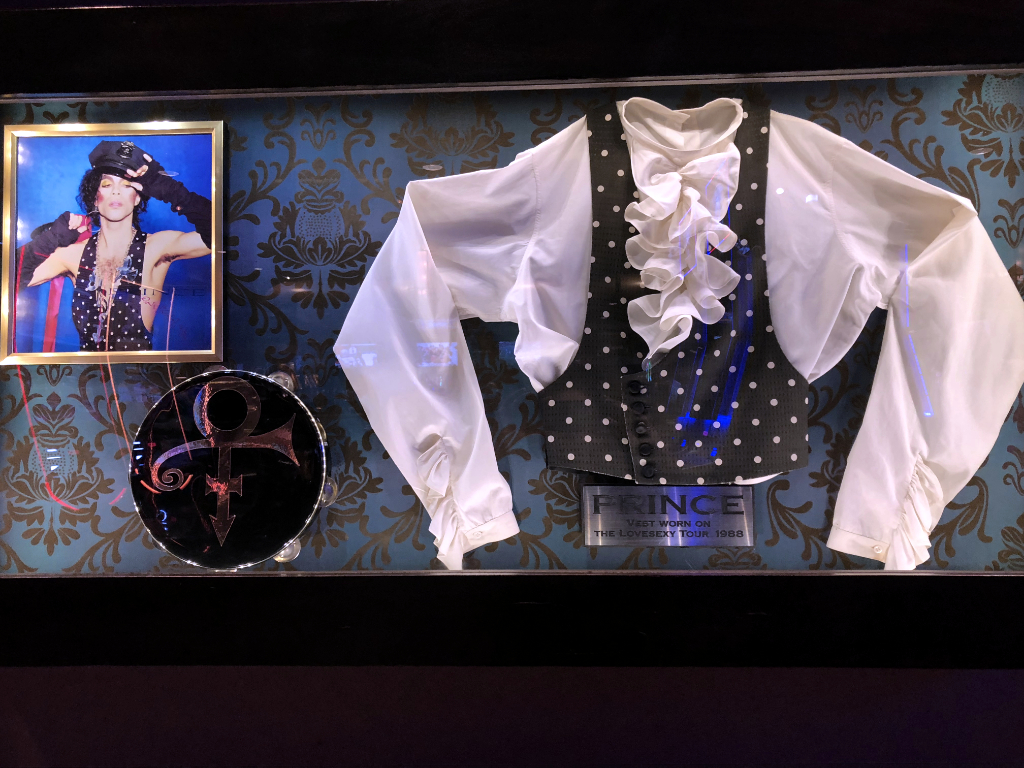
An outfit worn by Prince

The Hard Rock featured various memorabilia in conjunction with its music theme. Warwick Stone was the longtime curator for the Hard Rock Hotel and Hard Rock International. At the time of its opening, the resort contained $2 million worth of music memorabilia, including concert outfits worn by Aerosmith, Lenny Kravitz, Madonna, and Van Halen. The Hard Rock also had a display dedicated to Kurt Cobain, and a piece of the plane that Otis Redding died in. Other items included one of Elton John's pianos, a drum kit used by Stone Temple Pilots, and the shoeshine stand that James Brown worked at as a child. Casino chips featured the likenesses of rock musicians such as Jimi Hendrix and Bob Seger. The resort's Viva Las Vegas Lounge featured a façade with screens showing music videos. Other music-themed features included a piano-shaped roulette table and a chandelier made of gold saxophones.

As of December 1998, the Hard Rock's collection of musical memorabilia totaled more than 10,000 items, including guitars autographed by Bob Dylan and George Michael. Other items included an Elvis Presley jumpsuit and black acoustic guitar which were worth $300,000. The Hard Rock also had a collection of various Beatles memorabilia worth more than $100,000. The oldest item in the collection was a Les Paul guitar from around 1955 that had been played by Bill Haley. Many of the items came from musicians who performed at the Joint. Because of a lack of space, some items were stored in warehouses and were expected to be put on display at the Hard Rock once the 1999 expansion was complete.

When Morton agreed to sell the Hard Rock in 2006, the sale agreement included all of the music memorabilia, with the exception of two items that his sons wanted: a floral print jacket and Flying V guitar, both used by Hendrix. A storage room, located on the sixth floor of the hotel, contained memorabilia that was not currently on display. Exhibits in the collection were rotated based on current popularity and relevance. For example, items relating to a specific singer would be put on display following the singer's death.

As of 2011, one of the most photographed and recognizable items in the collection was a British flag dress that had been worn, more than 15 years earlier, by Geri Halliwell of the Spice Girls. Other items included Hendrix's address book; a leather jacket, guitar and top hat worn by Slash; and a colorful suit worn by David Bowie. Also in the collection was an airbrushed painting of Bowie that was used as the cover art for his 1974 album Diamond Dogs. At the time, one of the most expensive items in the collection was the Elvis Presley jumpsuit, worth $300,000.

Stone left the resort in 2016 and chose Beau Dobney to replace him as the overseer of the collection. At the time, the resort had more than 3,000 pieces of memorabilia, with approximately 200 items on display. In 2019, Dobney opened a 2,600 sq ft (240 m^{2}) exhibit to commemorate the upcoming 25th anniversary of the Hard Rock Hotel. The exhibition included rare items from musicians, and hard hats and shovels used in the resort's 1994 groundbreaking ceremony.

== Features ==
=== Casino ===
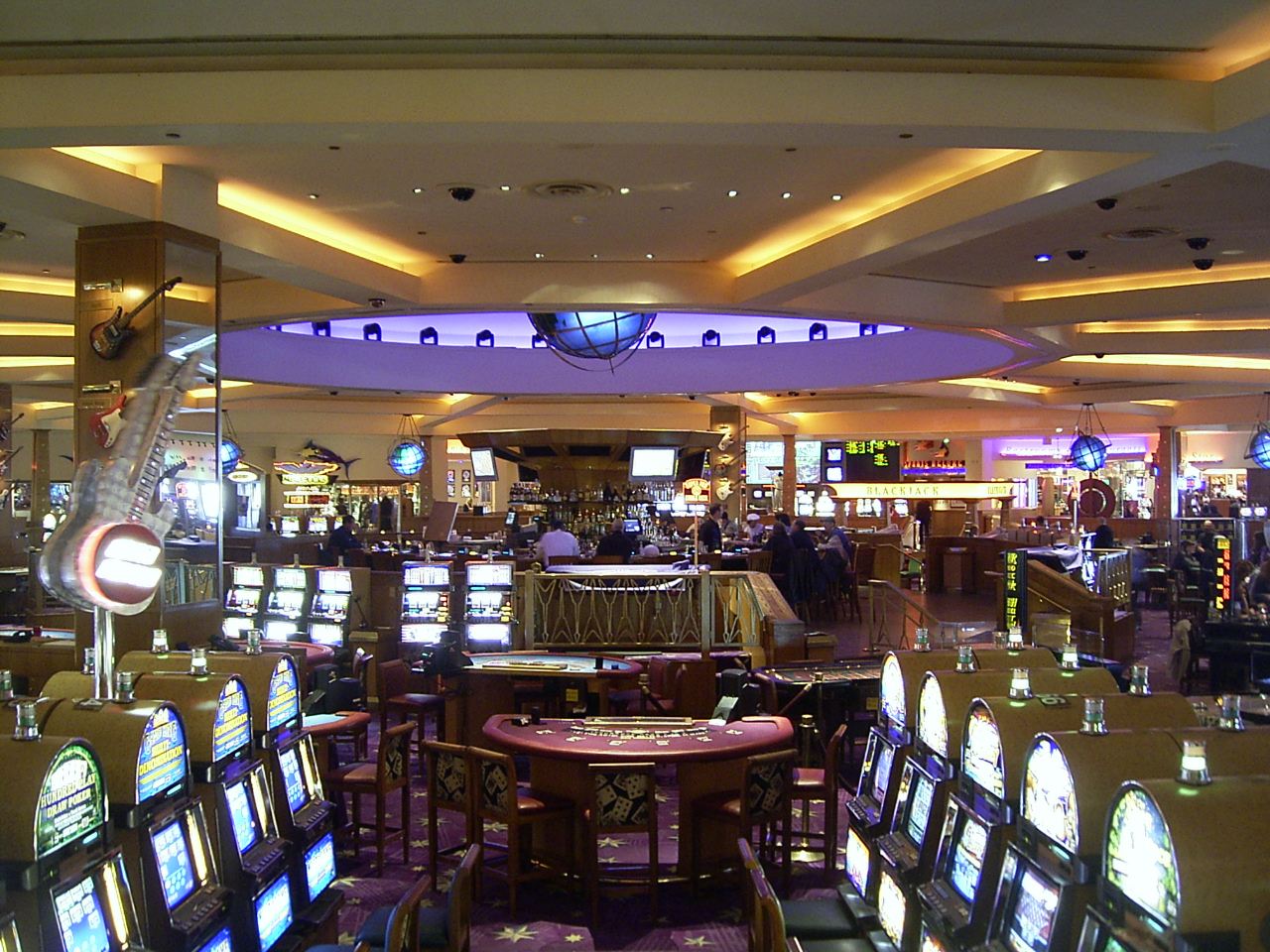
Hard Rock casino in 2004

The Hard Rock opened with a 28,000 sq ft (2,600 m^{2}) casino, which included 800 slot machines. By June 2005, the Hard Rock's Peacock Lounge had become one of the first venues in Las Vegas to use "smart" casino chips embedded with radio-frequency identification hardware. As of September 2008, a $30 million poker room had been opened in the casino, replacing a cigar shop. The poker room measured 7,000 sq ft (650 m^{2}) and included 18 tables. Following the resort's 2007-2010 expansion, the casino measured 61,704 square feet (5,732.5 m^{2}). Up to that time, the casino portion of the resort had not been a significant source of revenue.

In February 2010, the Hard Rock signed a deal to begin offering eDeck portable devices, created by Cantor Gaming. The eDeck allowed customers to play gambling games in non-gaming areas of the resort such as bars, restaurants, and near the pool area. Simultaneously, the Hard Rock launched an effort to attract Asian gamblers, a group who had frequently played at other resorts on the Las Vegas Strip. The casino began offering popular Asian games such as baccarat, and the resort also scheduled several events to celebrate the Chinese New Year. Later in 2010, modifications were made to table games and slot machines in an effort to appeal to local gamblers. Cantor also began operating a sports book at the resort. A high limit gaming area was added in 2012. At the time, Asians made up 10% of the casino's clientele, and the Hard Rock hoped to increase the figure to 30% within a year.

=== Hotel ===
The Hard Rock opened with 339 rooms in its 11-story hotel tower. The 1999 hotel expansion consisted of another 11-story tower, built north of the original, that increased the total room count to 670. The two towers that were added in 2009 increased the room count to 1,506. The 17-story Paradise Tower had 490 rooms, including 10 suites and a penthouse. The HRH Tower was an all-suite facility with 374 rooms, including 359 regular suites, eight spa villas with pool access, and seven penthouses located on the 16th floor. After the new towers were added in 2009, the original, conjoined towers became known as the Casino Tower.

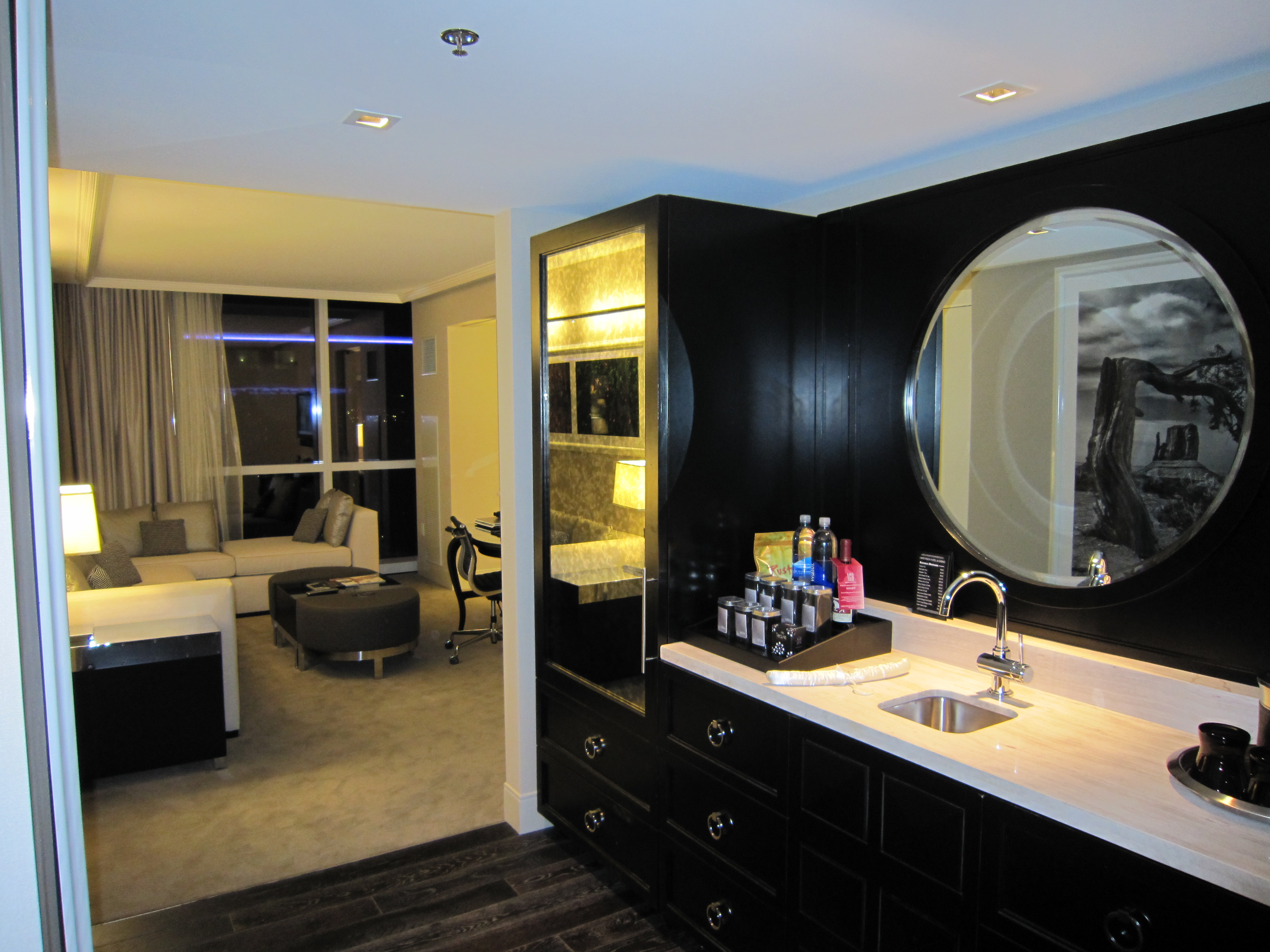
A room in the HRH Tower

The Paradise Tower was built on the north side of the Hard Rock property, and the HRH Tower was built on the southern side. While the Paradise Tower was designed with corporate and convention guests in mind, the HRH Tower targeted a sophisticated, upper-class clientele. The HRH Tower included a hair salon and the 25,000 sq ft (2,300 m^{2}) Reliquary spa, while the original Rock Spa also continued to operate at the resort.

In 2003, the hotel unveiled a new 5,000 sq ft (460 m^{2}) high roller suite designed by Kelly Wearstler. The suite included its own bowling alley and a 24-hour on-call butler, as well as two televisions providing live footage of performances at the Joint. The suite cost $7,500 per night. As of 2012, the hotel included the 2,800 sq ft (260 m^{2}) Provocateur suite, which had an intimate setting and rented for $3,500 a night. The HRH Tower included the Nirvana suite, typically reserved for high rollers. The suite measured nearly 3,000 sq ft (280 m^{2}) and had its own outdoor plunge pool.

=== Music venues and nightclubs ===
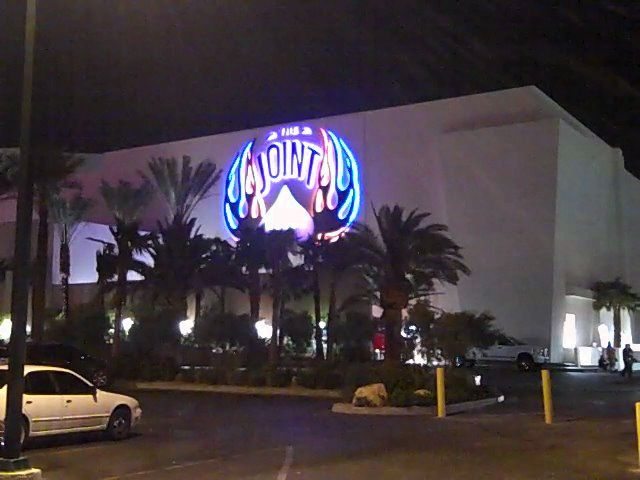
The new Joint, seen in 2009

The original Joint opened in 1995. It initially had capacity for 1,200 people, later increased to 2,000. It closed in February 2009, and the new, larger Joint opened two months later.

The 1999 expansion added a nightclub named Baby's, located in the Hard Rock's basement. Ownership of Baby's was split between the resort and Los Angeles nightclub operator Sean MacPhearson, who operated Baby's as well. Baby's closed in February 2004, for a $6 million renovation to take place. It reopened three months later as Body English. Peter Morton named the new nightclub after an Edward Ruscha painting with the same name, which he came upon while collecting artwork in New York. Body English was designed by Kelly Wearstler. Hard Rock executive Harry Morton, son of Peter Morton, said, "We wanted it to resemble a 1960s British rock star's mansion. There's a big move to get ultra-modern. We wanted a throwback." Attendees to the club's opening included Robin Leach, Joey Fatone, and Chris Kirkpatrick. The club offered memberships at a cost of $25,000 a year.

A 5,000 sq ft (460 m^{2}) club, with occasional live performances, opened in July 2008, under the name Wasted Space. It was designed by Carey Hart and was a joint venture between him and the Hard Rock. Other investors included Benji and Joel Madden, as well as Jason Giambi. Wasted Space had capacity for 400 to 500 people, and it had a less-strict dress code compared to other Las Vegas nightclubs. It occupied space previously held by the Viva Las Vegas Lounge. Wasted Space showcased local musicians on Friday nights, and also hosted independent musicians on Tuesday nights before largely scrapping such acts in 2009. The club subsequently sat vacant on Tuesday nights, as it often did on Mondays. A renovation in 2009 tore down walls to expose the club's lounge to the casino area, in an attempt by the resort to increase its liquor profits.

Another nightclub, Vanity, opened with a New Year's Eve celebration on December 31, 2009. Vanity was built on the second floor of the HRH Tower. It included two seating areas, and an outdoor terrace overlooking the resort's pool area. The club's centerpiece was a $1 million floor-to-ceiling chandelier with 20,000 crystals. Vanity was owned by Jason Giambi and Cory McCormack. The club was created by Charles Doell and Mister Important Design. Vanity measured 14,000 sq ft (1,300 m^{2}), and numerous mirrors were located throughout the club for patrons to check their appearance. The club had a theme of self-importance, with McCormack saying, "Vanity will cater to your ego, where the most important person in the club is you." The women's bathroom at the club consisted of 2,000 sq ft (190 m^{2}) and included several vanity stations, as well as a $40,000 chandelier.

Body English closed with a New Year's Eve party on December 31, 2009, and was only occasionally used for special events over the next few years. It was announced in August 2010 that Wasted Space would close some time before spring 2011. It ultimately closed on September 19, 2010, with Alien Ant Farm as the final performance. Wasted Space was closed to become the site of the Hard Rock's race and sports book.

Another music venue, Vinyl, opened in August 2012, taking the former site of the Hard Rock Lounge. Vinyl had capacity for 650 people, and it often featured after-shows following other performances held at the Joint, as a way of keeping customers at the resort longer. Vinyl was described by the Hard Rock as "an incubator for young bands" who could later go on to perform in the Joint. Michael Grimm had a short-lived residency at Vinyl during 2015, and a musical, Raiding the Rock Vault, premiered there in March 2017. The venue also hosted stand-up comedians such as Tom Green, Andrew Dice Clay, and Steve-O. Drummer Vinnie Paul had his final performance at Vinyl in June 2018, five days before his death.

Body English reopened in December 2012, before closing again in July 2015, to become a new entertainment space. In November 2014 the Rockband Kiss played a historic nine-show run at the Hard Rock Hotel. In May 2016, the Hard Rock announced plans for a male revue show, Magic Mike Live, based on the 2012 film Magic Mike. The show had been in the works for more than a year, and was part of an effort to attract more of a female demographic to the resort. Body English was turned into Club Domina, a 450-person cabaret nightclub. Magic Mike Live debuted at the club in April 2017, and 500 shows were performed within a year of its opening. Magic Mike Live surpassed 1,000 shows in 2019. It was announced that the show would end that year and relocate to Sahara Las Vegas in 2020, as a result of the Hard Rock's impending closure and renovation.

=== Pool area ===
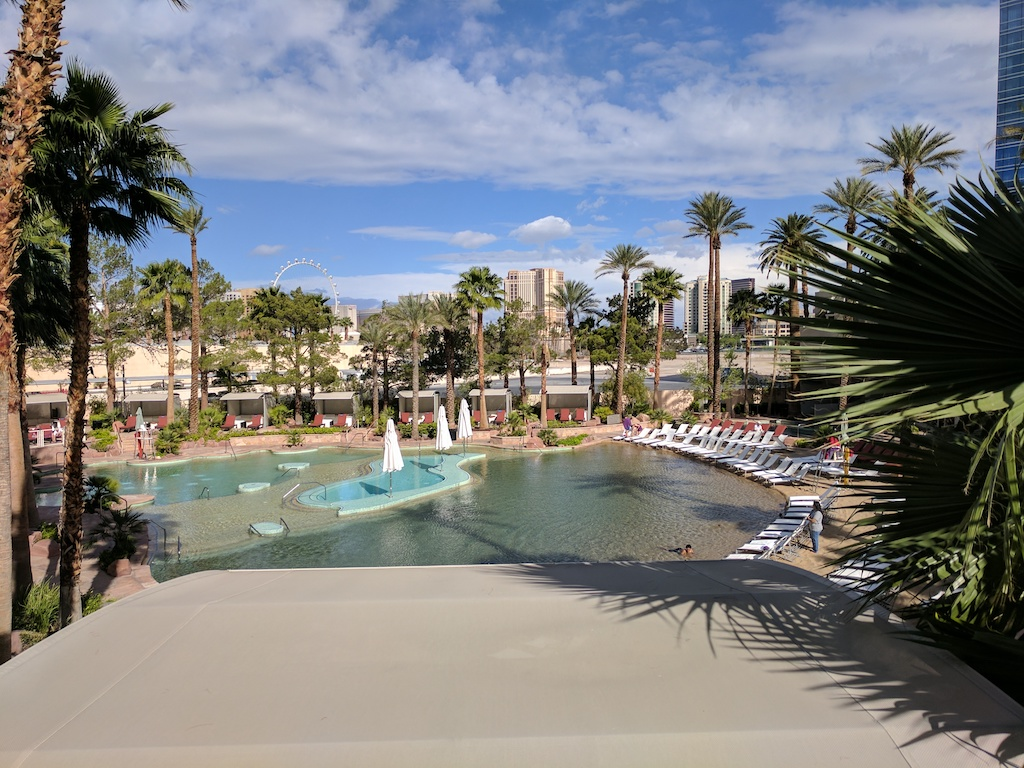
Pool area in 2017

Upon its opening, the resort included the Hard Rock Beach Club, featuring a pool, cabanas, and a sandy beach. Each year from 1996 to 2006, the hotel hosted beach volleyball tournaments. (Note: As stated in the Las Vegas Sun and Las Vegas Review-Journal:) During the 1999 expansion, the pool and beach club area was expanded by two acres, and became one of the most popular party spots in Las Vegas. The pool included two floating craps tables. In 2004, the resort launched a public pool party known as Rehab, which became a successful, annual event until its end in 2018.

By 2006, the pool had been chosen as one of the top 10 pools in the world by the Travel Channel, and the property occupied by the pool was valued at $50 million. A series of poolside concerts debuted in 2007, under the name Friday Night Live, and it continued in subsequent years. A $4 million redesign of the north pool area had been completed by June 2008. During 2008 and 2009, the hotel offered its Relax pool parties as a laidback alternative to Rehab.

HRH Beach Club opened in March 2010, along with the two-story Skybar. The area was meant as a quiet and sophisticated alternative to the original, adjacent Hard Rock pool, where Rehab was held. The new beach club added three pools to the resort, and it featured an upscale and modern design similar to the HRH Tower. Skybar was designed as a relaxing location, with capacity for only 200 people, to avoid crowding. In 2015, the pool area was ranked number one by USA Today readers, as part of a list of the top 10 hotel pools in the U.S.

=== Restaurants ===
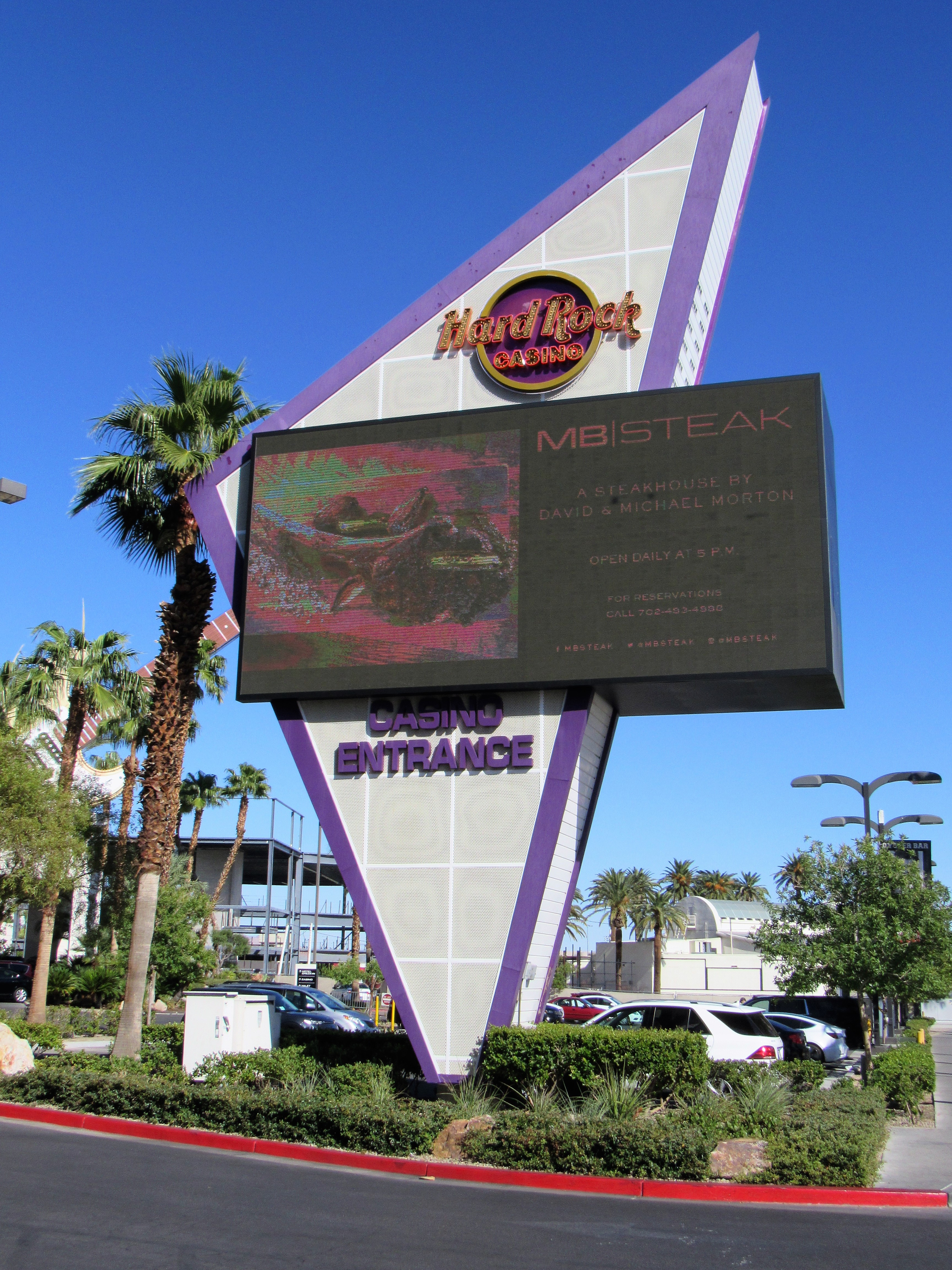
Hard Rock sign, advertising MB Steak

Aside from the adjacent Hard Rock Cafe, the resort itself included two restaurants at the time of its opening: Mortoni's, an Italian restaurant; and Lucky's 24/7, a 24-hour coffee shop, later known as Mr. Lucky's. Mortoni's was popular among celebrities. The restaurant had seating for 120 people and featured a view of the pool area. Several restaurants were added in 1999 with the resort's expansion. One new eatery was Nobu, a Japanese restaurant by Nobu Matsuhisa, with actor Robert De Niro as a partner. Nobu continued operations inside the Hard Rock until the closure of the resort in 2020. Peter Morton's father, Arnold J. Morton, was involved in developing the new restaurant A.J.'s, also added in the 1999 expansion. In addition, Harry Morton created Pink Taco, a restaurant which also offered approximately 150 types of tequila.

Simon Kitchen & Bar, by chef Kerry Simon, was added in November 2002, before closing five years later. A new Italian restaurant, Ago, was open by 2008, as part of ongoing renovations. Ago was owned by Agostino Sciandri and De Niro, and it replaced Simon. At the time, Nobu was in the process of an expansion. A steakhouse, Rare 120, opened in April 2009. It was developed and marketed by the Dolce Group, and was operated by the Hard Rock Hotel, before closing in 2011. A 170-seat restaurant, 35 Steaks + Martinis, opened in 2012. The Culinary Dropout restaurant opened later that year, and featured a uniform-free wait staff.

By 2013, the resort included an Asian restaurant known as Fu. Forte Pizza opened in 2015, and Goose Island Pub opened its first Nevada location inside the Hard Rock in 2016. In 2017, the 16-seat Oyster Bar opened inside the HRH Tower, and MB Steak opened at the resort after the closure of 35 Steaks. MB ("Morton Brothers") was created by David and Michael Morton, the brothers of Peter Morton. The steakhouse marked the return of the Morton family to the Hard Rock Hotel.

=== Retail ===
The Hard Rock had several retail stores. An expanded retail store opened in November 1998, as part of the then-ongoing expansion. The store measured over 3,600 sq ft (330 m^{2}), more than three times the size of its predecessor. A lingerie store was added in 2003, and it eventually began offering delivery service of its products to hotel guests. Carey Hart opened a tattoo shop, Hart & Huntington, at the Hard Rock in April 2009. John Varvatos opened a clothing store at the Hard Rock later that year. The store sold vinyl records and vintage music equipment, and had a stage for live musical performances. Affliction, a chain of clothing stores, opened its flagship store at the Hard Rock in October 2009. The resort's 3,300 sq ft (310 m^{2}) retail store was replaced by casino space in the 2012 renovation, and a 1,100 sq ft (100 m^{2}) store was opened elsewhere in the resort. The earlier store was considered too large, and the new location carried items typically sold in casino souvenir stores, rather than rock and roll merchandise. Three luxury retailers opened in 2017, specializing in clothing, jewelry, and wristwatches.

== Appearances in media ==
The guitar sign at the Hard Rock Cafe is featured in the 1992 film Honey, I Blew Up the Kid. The Hard Rock Hotel is featured in the 1997 film Con Air, in which a plane crashes through the hotel's Fender Stratocaster guitar sign. The film inaccurately portrays the hotel as being on the Las Vegas Strip. The Hard Rock's Joint hosted the world premiere of Con Air on June 2, 1997. In 2000, scenes were shot at the Hard Rock for the film Tomcats. The Hard Rock was also featured in the April 2001 "Girls of the Hard Rock" issue of Playboy.

The 2004 video game Grand Theft Auto: San Andreas features numerous fictional casinos based on real ones, such as the V-Rock Hotel, inspired by the Hard Rock. In 2004, scenes were shot at the pool and a penthouse suite for a first-season episode of The O.C. A 2006 episode of Entourage titled "Vegas Baby, Vegas!" was shot at the Hard Rock as well. Scenes were also filmed there for the 2008 film 21.

Rehab and its security, bartending, and waitressing staffs are the subject of a reality television series titled Rehab: Party at the Hard Rock Hotel, which aired for three seasons from 2008 to 2010. The 25th season of The Real World, which premiered in 2011, was filmed partially in a suite at the Hard Rock's Casino Tower, which served as the living quarters for the show's participants. The suite was redesigned to accommodate filming, and it was reopened to hotel guests after production concluded.

On a few occasions, VH1 and MTV used the resort to host music video countdowns such as Total Request Live. Canadian hard rock group My Darkest Days filmed their video for "Porn Star Dancing" at the Vanity nightclub in 2010. The music video for Sean Paul's 2011 song "Got 2 Luv U" was also filmed partially at the hotel and Vanity.

== Lawsuits and controversies ==
In April 1996, Harley-Davidson sued the Hard Rock for damages, alleging trademark violations. Harley-Davidson stated that the casino had used its logo on slot machine reels, and that 10 of these machines were used in a slot promotion that offered a Harley-Davidson motorcycle as a jackpot. Harley-Davidson did not want its logo to be associated with the casino. A confidential settlement was reached between the two later that year.

Also in 1996, two wheelchair users sued the hotel, alleging that its two shuttle buses were inaccessible to them and were in violation of the Americans with Disabilities Act of 1990. In 1998, the hotel was ordered to replace or modify the buses to comply with the law. Areas of the resort were also modified to be wheelchair-accessible. In 1999, a woman sued the Hard Rock over alleged inadequate security in the resort's parking lot, where she was injured during an attempted robbery.

In 2000, a Hard Rock surveillance employee leaked a video tape of police officers who had behaved in a belligerent manner while arresting a woman at the resort. The employee was later fired for violating the resort's confidentiality policy. He filed a complaint with the Nevada Gaming Control Board, which rejected the complaint, stating that they did not have authority to punish the Hard Rock for his firing. The former employee later filed a lawsuit against the Hard Rock. In 2002, a couple sued the resort and MTV for invasion of privacy, fraud, and emotional distress. The couple had been unwittingly involved in a television prank that depicted a fake human corpse in their hotel bathroom.

A man sued the Hard Rock in 2003, claiming that he was injured by security guards while attending a concert at the Joint. The resort claimed that the man was actually intoxicated and had started a fight with someone, who was not a security guard. Other patrons also filed lawsuits against Hard Rock security guards over the years, alleging issues such as assault and false imprisonment.

Sara Robinson, a former beverage manager at a Hard Rock bar, sued Dennis Rodman and the resort in 2007. She alleged that Rodman had assaulted her in 2006, and that the Hard Rock was negligent in keeping him off the property after that. She also alleged that the resort retaliated against her when she complained about the incident, ultimately firing her. She and the Hard Rock settled the issue, and she later won a $225,000 judgment against Rodman.

In April 2011, an attorney for Paris Hilton filed a lawsuit against the Hard Rock, alleging that she was owed $200,000 for promotional appearances that she made at the resort in 2009. As of June 2011, the Rare 120 steakhouse was performing poorly. That month, the Hard Rock terminated a contract to share the restaurant's revenue with the Dolce Group. When the Hard Rock closed Rare 120 in July 2011, the resort was sued by the Dolce Group, which alleged that the restaurant suffered low revenue because of various cost-cutting measures and management changes ordered by the resort.

Carey Hart's S&H Projects, which operated the Wasted Space club, sued the Hard Rock in 2011, alleging that the resort "engaged in a systemic pattern of failing to attribute revenues due to the Wasted Space Lounge while simultaneously attributing expenses from other venues at the resort to the lounge." Companies affiliated with Jason Giambi had invested in Wasted Space and Rare 120, and the companies filed a lawsuit in 2012, against Morgans Hotel Group, Credit Suisse, Brookfield, and Warner Gaming. The suit alleged that the defendant companies "acted in concert with the intention to defraud, convert and otherwise misappropriate (the Giambi companies) out of their investment money through, among other things, improper accounting practices, intentional mismanagement of venues and refusal to pay profits generated to (the Giambi companies)."

In 2011, Brookfield challenged the results of a 2009 election in which the resort's valet parking staff had voted to unionize. The issue remained unresolved as of 2015. In 2017, the Hard Rock agreed to settle a separate issue with the Culinary Workers Union, which had previously accused the resort of distributing anti-union materials to its workers to persuade them from unionization.

=== Nightclub and pool problems ===
In 2000, the Las Vegas Metropolitan Police Department conducted a month-long investigation into rumors that drugs were sold and used at the Baby's nightclub. Ecstasy was found to be a particular problem at the nightclub, and the investigation also found that some guests were allowed inside without paying a cover charge, while some bartenders were allowed to overcharge for cocktails. Owner Sean MacPhearson and his management team were removed from operations following the investigation.

In 2002, the Hard Rock settled a complaint with the Nevada Gaming Control Board and agreed to pay a $100,000 fine to the Nevada Gaming Commission. The five-count complaint alleged that several instances of inappropriate sexual conduct had occurred at Baby's one year earlier and that security guards there allowed the activity to proceed. The complaint also alleged that the resort inappropriately used its surveillance cameras to follow and videotape members of the control board, as well as nightclub customers. Hard Rock Hotel president Don Marrandino said, "We've had a lot of training, and we've explained to our people that people can't go over the line. We know public nudity is over the line. But provocative dress. That's fine. Look, the Hard Rock is the sexiest, coolest place in town. We want to be the edgy, fun place."

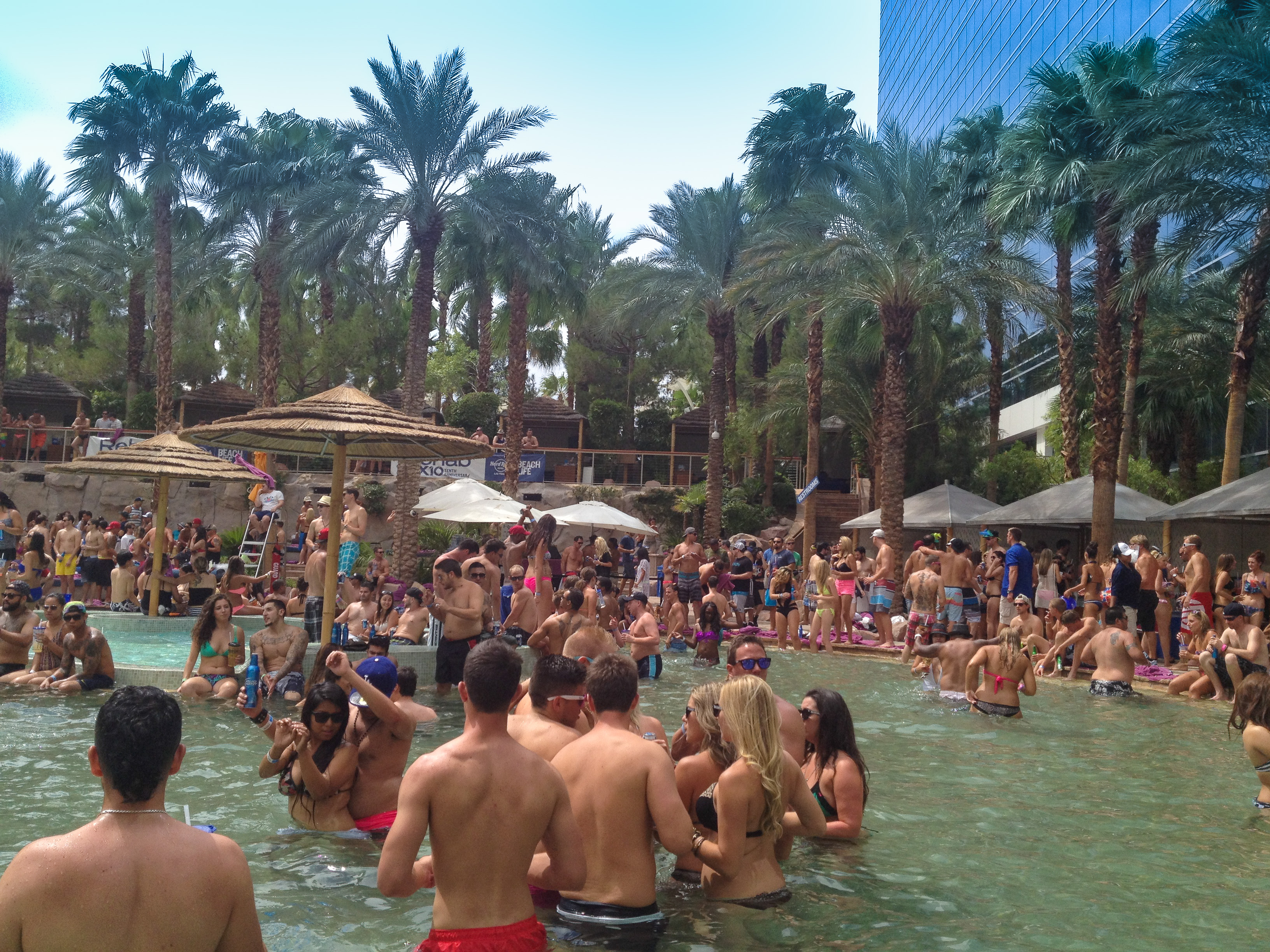
A Rehab pool party

By 2009, drugs and prostitution had become an issue at resort pools in the Las Vegas Valley. That year, detectives with the Las Vegas Metropolitan Police Department launched an undercover operation at Rehab. They subsequently arrested seven people on narcotic-related charges, while another was arrested for solicitation of prostitution. Later that year, and into 2010, undercover detectives initiated sting operations and found that they were easily able to acquire illegal drugs from employees of the Hard Rock's nightclubs. In Las Vegas, drug use at casino nightclubs was becoming a frequent problem. While Fred Kleisner operated the resort in 2010, he emphasized policies that would help keep the Hard Rock out of trouble with Nevada regulators. Such policies related to issues such as conduct and alcohol consumption on the property, and Kleisner also hired a company to ensure that the policies were being observed. Later that year, random drug tests were performed on Hard Rock employees to ensure a drug-free environment at the resort.

In September 2010, Hard Rock Cafe International sued the Las Vegas resort to cancel its name licensing agreement, citing negative publicity associated with the resort's Rehab pool parties and its reality television series, Rehab: Party at the Hard Rock Hotel. The lawsuit alleged that the resort was being portrayed as "a destination that revels in drunken debauchery, acts of vandalism, sexual harassment, violence, criminality and a host of other behavior". The lawsuit also cited the earlier arrests made at Rehab. The Hard Rock Hotel filed a counterclaim that the company was harassing the resort. At the end of 2010, the Hard Rock was fined $650,000 by Nevada regulators for the earlier drug offenses. It was the highest fine in Nevada history for drug violations. After the Hard Rock was fined, Hard Rock Cafe International amended its lawsuit to include new information about the drug dealing and inappropriate sexual activity taking place at the resort, citing these as further reasons the property should lose its Hard Rock name. When Brookfield took over ownership in 2011, it tried to settle the dispute with Hard Rock Cafe International.

=== Advertising ===
After the Palms resort opened in 2001, the Hard Rock began using risqué advertising to stay competitive and appeal to its target clientele of people ages 21 to 40, the same demographic sought by the Palms. As part of the 2002 nightclub settlement, the Hard Rock was required to submit questionable advertising material to compliance officers for a review before publication.

In January 2003, the resort was criticized for a billboard advertisement that featured a topless woman with only a pair of dice to conceal her nipples. The billboard was considered obscene and was removed after county agencies complained about it. In November 2003, Nevada Gaming Control Board member Bobby Siller criticized risqué print advertisements for the Hard Rock. One such ad featured a man and woman in seductive poses, accompanied by playing cards, poker chips, and the tagline, "There's always a temptation to cheat." Siller believed the ad could suggest that cheating occurs in casinos, and he said another ad contained references to drug use.

==== 2004 complaint ====
In January 2004, the Nevada Gaming Control Board filed a three-count complaint against the Hard Rock for its past advertising, some of which was deemed sexually suggestive. Included in the complaint was a billboard ad that was shown during the National Finals Rodeo that featured a woman with panties down around her ankles, accompanied by the slogan, "Get ready to buck all night." The control board also alleged that a radio advertisement gave the implication that having wives in two states was acceptable behavior for Hard Rock customers. The control board stated that the Hard Rock failed to "conduct advertising and public relations in accordance with decency, dignity, good taste, honesty and inoffensiveness", as required by state gaming law. The complaint carried a potential fine of up to $300,000. The control board stated that it was less concerned with sexual ads and more worried about the ads that allegedly promoted cheating and drug use. The control board alleged that the ads harmed the reputation of Nevada's gaming industry, and pro-family groups were also opposed to the ads. The advertising campaign was successful despite the controversy, and Morton later said that he had the final approval on all ads, including the ones in question.

The Hard Rock announced in March 2004 that it would fight the complaint, stating that the ads were protected under the First Amendment to the United States Constitution. The following month, the Hard Rock agreed to settle the complaint and pay a $300,000 fine. The proposed settlement included a sentence stating that the resort's free speech rights were subject to constraints by local, state and federal law. This portion of the settlement received criticism from Allen Lichtenstein, an uninvolved ACLU general counselor who said that the government could not censor such advertisements. Some opinion writers also believed that the control board was misusing its power to harass the resort over its advertising, infringing on free speech rights covered by the First Amendment. Siller declined to support the proposed settlement, alleging that it included a sentence which inaccurately portrayed the terms of the 2002 advertising agreement. According to the proposed settlement, Hard Rock executives believed that the 2002 agreement only applied to advertising that would be done on the premises. Siller denied that this was the case, and stated that hotel officials had failed to admit their mistakes.

The settlement was approved by the control board in May 2004, but was rejected by the Nevada Gaming Commission later that month. The commission felt that the settlement was too vague and that it would set a new and unhelpful precedent throughout the gaming industry on how to handle advertising. Some commissioners also questioned the earlier assertion by the control board that one of the ads promoted casino cheating, stating that no reasonable person would perceive the ad in such a way. Lichtenstein also stated that "the intent of the ad was quite obvious. No reasonable person could assume otherwise. That someone (unreasonably) construed the words to suggest illegality doesn't make the ad illegal." The models featured in the advertisements stated that the ads were not meant to encourage illegal activity, and that the content of the ads had an obvious meaning despite the accusations by the control board. One commissioner concluded that Siller had threatened the Hard Rock when he said, earlier that month, that he would seek disciplinary action against the resort's gaming license if future ad violations occurred. Siller denied claims from critics who said that he was biased against the Hard Rock, saying that he was only performing his job duties.

In July 2004, the Hard Rock was planning a risqué $15 million advertising campaign across the United States, despite the past controversy and fines. Kevin Kelley, the president of the Hard Rock, said, "We are mindful of our relationship with the regulators and authorities, but we also try to do a good job of balancing things for our customers. We have a market to serve and we are doing things to connect to that market." In August 2004, the Hard Rock was planning to reduce its use of heavily sexual advertisements. Phil Shalala, the vice president of marketing for the resort, said about such ads, "That's what everybody else is doing. We were the ones that set the standard. We need to move away from skin and do something different." However, Shalala said the new marketing approach was not in response to the concerns raised by the gaming control board. That month, the resort unveiled a new billboard advertisement which featured cartoon illustrations of animals accompanied by the message, "Another clean & inoffensive billboard from your friends at the Hard Rock Hotel & Casino." The resort denied that the ad was meant as a sarcastic response to Nevada gaming regulators. Some critics believed the billboard contained hidden sexual references.

In August 2004, the Hard Rock filed a motion to dismiss the three-count complaint, and the ACLU filed a friend of the court brief asking the gaming commission to grant the motion. The motion stated that a government agency could not censor content that it deems inappropriate, and that, "Moreover, given current Las Vegas community standards, the advertisements, as a legal matter, also cannot be characterized as obscenity." Nevada attorney general Brian Sandoval argued that the Hard Rock was not eligible for free speech, and that state regulations took precedence over constitutional arguments.

In September 2004, the gaming commission dismissed two of the complaints, relating to the ads. The commission concluded that the ads were satirical and did not promote illegal activity. The final complaint remained in effect, and related to the 2002 advertising agreement that the Hard Rock allegedly broke. In October 2004, the Hard Rock settled with the gaming control board and agreed to pay a $100,000 fine. The settlement was approved by the gaming commission the following month. As part of the deal, Hard Rock management – rather than a compliance committee – would be directly responsible for determining whether advertisements were appropriate. In response to the 2004 advertising controversy, state senator Mark Schneider introduced a senate bill in March 2005 that would have limited the control board's ability to fine casinos over their ads. Schneider withdrew the bill a month later after meeting with Siller and other control board members.

==== 2012 criticism ====
In October 2012, the Clark County Commission voted to temporarily rename Paradise Road as Paradise City Road, after the Guns N' Roses song "Paradise City". The name change was made to reflect residency concerts that the band would be holding at the Joint into the following month. An illustrated advertisement for the residency depicted a disheveled woman with an exposed breast and her underwear pulled down. It was a modified version of the original, controversial cover art for the group's 1987 album Appetite for Destruction, which had been replaced shortly after release. The advertisement was criticized for its alleged suggestion and glorification of sexual abuse towards women. One commissioner regretted voting to rename Paradise Road in light of the ad controversy, but also said there was little the commission could do regarding the ad, citing First Amendment rights. The Hard Rock apologized for the ad and modified it.
