= Daniel Chávez Morán =

Mexican businessman and real estate developer

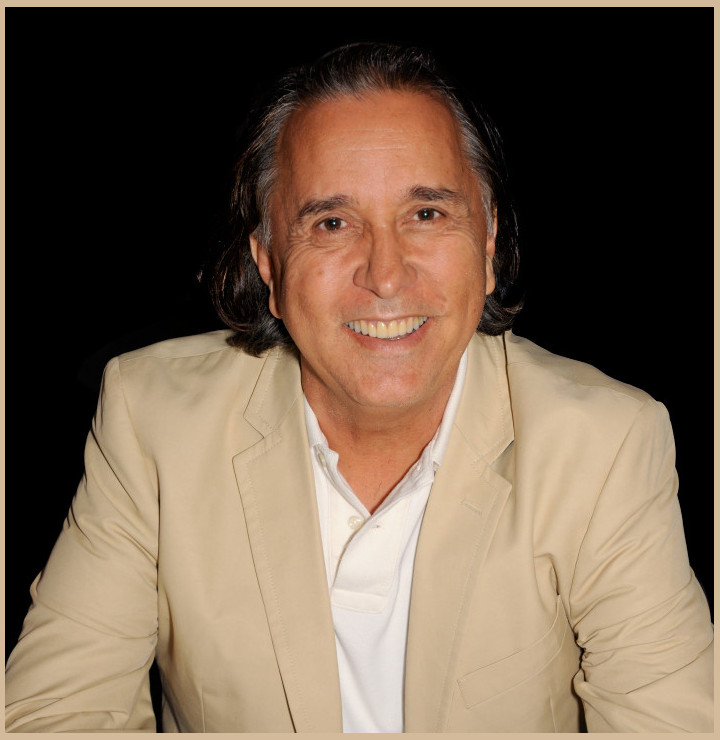
- Born: Daniel Jesús Chávez Morán; November 16, 1951 (age 73); Delicias, Chihuahua, Mexico
- Occupation(s): Founder of Grupo Vidanta, Delia Moran Vidanta Foundation, Grupo Vidanta Foundation
- Years active: 1974–present
- Children: Iván Chávez; Erika Chávez
- Website: http://www.danielchavezmoran.com/

Daniel Jesús Chávez Morán (born November 16, 1951) is a Mexican real estate developer and the founder of Grupo Vidanta, a real estate consortium which operates over 30 hotels in Latin America. He is also the founder of the Delia Moran Vidanta Foundation and the Vidanta Foundation, two non-profit philanthropic organizations.

Chávez Morán was named one of the top 100 most important businessmen in Mexico by CNN, and one of the 100 most important businessmen in Mexico by Expansión magazine in 2019. He is also a member of the Citizen Security Advisory Council of the United Nations Development Program. He lives in Mexico.

== Biography ==
Chávez Morán graduated from the University of Guadalajara, with a degree in civil engineering in 1973. In 1974, he founded the real estate company, Grupo Vidanta, a company which would go on to develop hotels, resorts, and golf courses.

Under Chávez Morán, Grupo Vidanta became one of Latin America’s largest employers with a staff of more than 17,000 employees and consistent appointment to the Great Place to Work Institute’s list of Best Companies to Work for in Mexico. It operates over 30 hotels and several golf courses. Moran’s son Iván Chávez has been with Grupo Vidanta since 2007 and as executive vice president is involved in the company's resort and entertainment interests.

Chávez Morán and Grupo Vidanta were also responsible for the funding for the Mar de Cortés International Airport which opened in 2009 in La Jolla de Cortés, near Puerto Peñasco in the state of Sonora.

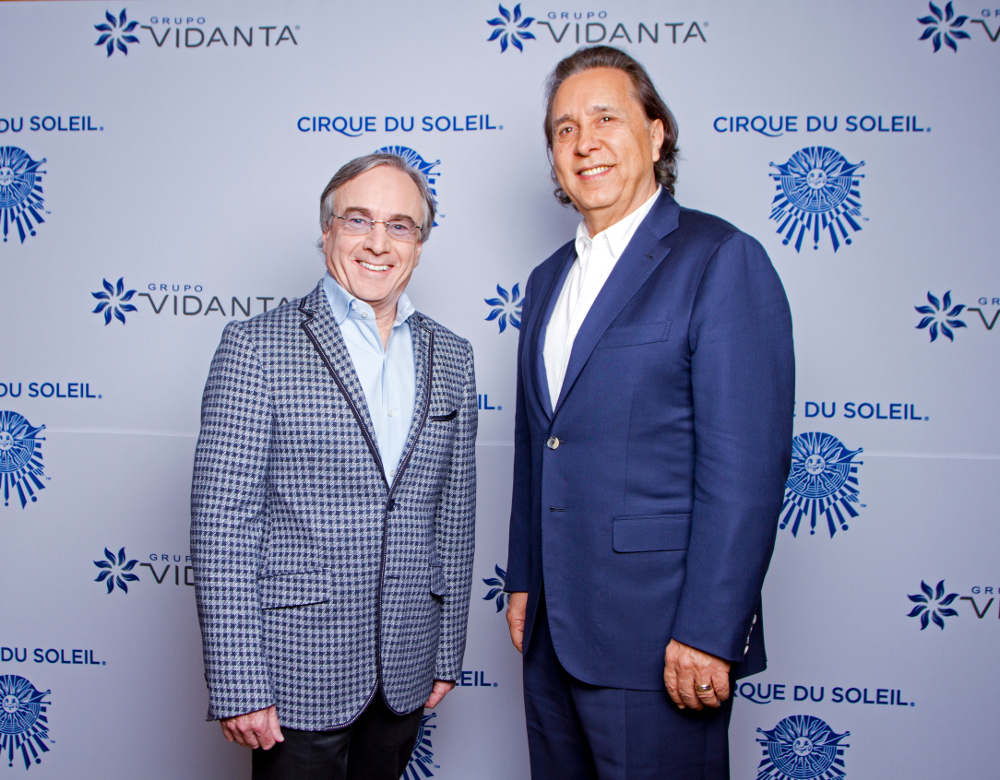
Daniel Chávez Morán with Daniel Lamarre from Cirque du Soleil

Chávez Morán and Grupo Vidanta also brought a Cirque du Soleil dinner show, titled JOYÀ, to Vidanta Riviera Maya.

In April 2016, Chávez Morán announced that Grupo Vidanta will be investing nearly $150 million and partnering with Hakkasan Group. In February 2018, the two companies debuted four new concepts at the Vidanta Los Cabos resort as part of this collaboration: OMNIA Dayclub, Herringbone, SHOREbar and Casa Calavera. In addition, it will be opening a theme park in Nuevo Vallarta in collaboration with Cirque du Soleil in 2023.

In November 2018, it was announced that Chávez Morán will be a part of the business advisory council to Mexico's President-elect Andrés Manuel López Obrador.

== Awards ==
- In March 2016, he was named Tourism Entrepreneur of the Year by Mexico's Confederation of National Chambers of Commerce, Services, and Tourism (CONCANACO Servytur).
- On November 17, 2015 Chávez Morán was given the Distinguished Leadership Award for the Americas Award by the Inter-American Dialogue in recognition of his philanthropic investments.
- On March 11, 2016, Daniel Chávez Morán was recognized with the Lifetime Achievement in Entrepreneurship Award by the Mexican Government.
- President's Leadership Council, Inter-American Dialogue
