= Grupo Vidanta =

Mexican conglomerate of hotels and resorts

- Type: Mexican conglomerate
- Industry: Real estate, resorts, golf courses, cruises
- Founded: 1974
- Founder: Daniel Chávez Morán
- Headquarters: Nuevo Vallarta, Mexico
- Area served: Mexico
- Key people: Ivan Chavez (Executive Vice President)
- Services: Design, construction, financing, operation of hotels
- Revenue: US$750 million (FY 2015)
- Number of employees: 17,000
- Subsidiaries: Vida Vacations; VidantaWorld; Vidanta
- Website: www.grupovidanta.com

Grupo Vidanta is a Mexican conglomerate involved in design, construction, financing, and operation and maintenance of hotels, resorts, cruises, and associated infrastructure. It also owns and operates the Mar de Cortés International Airport. Grupo Vidanta was founded by Daniel Chávez Morán in 1974 and is headquartered in Nuevo Vallarta, Mexico. The group has 25,000 employees and an estimated annual revenue of US$750 million (FY 2015).

== History ==
Grupo Vidanta was founded by Daniel Chávez Morán in 1974. It was registered as a company that is involved in design, construction, financing, operation and maintenance of hotels, resorts, cruises, and associated infrastructure.

== Businesses ==
In December 2010, the company launched a luxury, private destination club named Vida Vacations. The resort hotel brands associated with Vida Vacations' private club membership include Grand Luxxe, The Grand Bliss, The Grand Mayan, The Bliss, Mayan Palace, and Sea Garden.

In November 2014, Grupo Vidanta opened JOYÀ, a resident show of Cirque du Soleil with a capacity of 600 attendees within the Vidanta Riviera Maya resort in Riviera Maya, Mexico.

In 2015, the company invested in the James Bond film Spectre whose opening scene was filmed in Mexico.

In April 2016, Grupo Vidanta signed an exclusive partnership agreement with the Hakkasan Group. The deal, worth $150 million, led to the development of new concept beach clubs, nightlife venues, restaurants and a hotel at Mexico's Vidanta Resorts. In February 2018, three such concepts opened at the Vidanta Los Cabos resort: OMNIA Dayclub, SHOREbar, and Casa Calavera.

The company is in the planning/building stages of a $1.3 billion theme park-resort in Nuevo Vallarta, Nayarit, Mexico, in partnership with Cirque du Soleil.

Along with the founder Daniel Chávez Morán, his son Ivan Chavez forms the core leadership team at the company. Ivan Chavez joined the company as executive vice president in 2007 and currently oversees the company's resort and entertainment interests. Grupo Vidanta employs around 17,000 people across its businesses.

In July 2019, the company launched Jungala, a luxury waterpark at its resort in Riviera Maya, Mexico. Among other attractions, it features the longest lazy river setting in Latin America, spanning more than 1 kilometer in length.

=== Mar de Cortés International Airport ===
The Mar de Cortés International Airport, located in La Jolla de Cortés, Sonora, was opened on November 5, 2009.

=== Vidanta Golf ===
Grupo Vidanta owns seven golf courses under the Vidanta Golf Brand at Nuevo Vallarta, Riviera Maya, Los Cabos, Acapulco, and Puerto Peñasco. A Jack Nicklaus Golf Academy opened in Nuevo Vallarta in July 2012, which is the fifteenth Nicklaus Academy worldwide.

In 2011, it organized an annual Uniting Nations Cup golf tournament in Puerto Peñasco. In 2014, Mexican golfer Carlos Ortiz became the brand ambassador for Vidanta Golf.

In May 2015, the company opened a new golf course, designed by Greg Norman, in Riviera Nayarit in Mexico. The course can only be accessed by the longest golf cart suspension bridge in the world.

In 2016 and 2017, Grupo Vidanta held the Vidanta Celebrity Invitational Golf Tournament. In October 2017, the company opened The Lakes Course, a 10-hole course, at Nuevo Vallarta.

In late 2021, Vidanta Vallarta was announced as the new host venue for the PGA Tour's Mexico Open from 2022.

=== Vidanta Cruises ===
In 2017, Grupo Vidanta acquired and rebuilt a cruise ship. The renovations include a new engine, new technology, and custom redesign of the ship's interior and exterior. Renamed as VidantaWorld Elegant, the vessel has a passenger capacity of 298. and is currently set to debut April 14, 2022.

=== VidantaWorld ===
VidantaWorld is an entertainment and theme park of 2,500 acres currently under construction in Vallarta, consisting of three "dream parks" along with accommodations. Among many of its themes will be a "realm" dedicated to Cirque du Soleil and the SkyDream Parks Gondola which will provide transportation between the parks and the hotels on a loop of 4 miles and 150 feet in height. The park was originally scheduled to open in 2023.

== Initiatives ==
=== Vidanta Foundation ===
Vidanta Foundation is a not-for-profit organization that falls under Grupo Vidanta and was formed in 2005 by Daniel Chávez Morán. Its mission statement is “to promote the social sciences and democratic values in Latin America.".

=== Foro Vidanta ===
Foro Vidanta is an international symposium organized by Grupo Vidanta. It exists with an aim to initiate a dialogue between industry leaders and experts from around the world in order to establish recommendations on how to responsibly use tourism as an engine of positive change. The forum is supported by the College of Mexico, the National Autonomous University of Mexico (UNAM), and the Center for Research and Teaching in Economics.

Foro Vidanta's inaugural event was held in May 2018 in Nuevo Vallarta. Some of the presenters and speakers at the event included Mexico's Commissioner of Protected Areas Alejandro del Mazo Maza, Lonely Planet CEO Daniel Houghton, Cirque du Soleil President and CEO Daniel Lamarre, and Hollywood actresses and philanthropists Brooke Shields and Gwyneth Paltrow.

=== Delia Morán-Vidanta Foundation ===
Delia Morán-Vidanta Foundation is a CSR initiative started by the company in 2013 to contribute to the preparation and development of underprivileged children in Mexico. As of 2017, more than 500 children have benefited from its programs in the state of Nayarit.

== Financial performance ==
In 2015, the company recorded an annual revenue of $750 million.

== Sustainability ==
In 2004, Grupo Vidanta partnered with EarthCheck to promote sustainable tourism in Mexico. Together, they ensure the preservation and protection of flora and fauna in and around the company's resorts. Over the years, most Vidanta resorts have been recognized and certified by EarthCheck for their efforts in water and energy conservation, waste management and recycling, and food sustainability. In 2016, the Mayan Palace Puerto Peñasco received a gold certification from EarthCheck for its long-term commitment to sustainable tourism in Mexico.

In December 2016, Grupo Vidanta opened an EPA-regulated farm called 'Almaverde' on the grounds of its Vidanta Nuevo Vallarta resort. It was developed as a way to engage in sustainable farming to supply fresh produce to its own restaurants while preventing food wastage. Almaverde is spread out across seven hectares of land near the Ameca River in Mexico and annually produces around 67 varieties of fruits and vegetables.

In February 2019, the company was recognized by the Mexican Center for Philanthropy (CEMEFI) for its "socially responsible management and continuous improvement as part of its culture and business strategy." The same year, Vidanta Riviera Maya received EarthCheck Master Certification for meeting the watchdog body's environmental benchmarks.

== Awards and recognition ==
Obras awarded its 2015 ‘Building Project of the Year’ award to a theater owned by Grupo Vidanta in which a Cirque du Soleil performance and dinner venue, JOYÀ, is housed.

In 2016, Travel+Leisure magazine's México Hotel Awards recognized Vidanta's Grand Luxxe Riviera Maya in two categories: The award for Best Design/Décor; and the Reader's Choice Award for best overall experience, noting the hotel as the Best Hotel in Mexico. At the 2018 awards ceremony, it recognized Vidanta Los Cabos for Best Party and Vidanta Riviera Maya for Experiencia Gourmet.

In 2017, Grupo Vidanta was ranked 2nd in the Hospitality Sector as one of Mexico's Great Places to Work. It has been consistently ranked in the top 10 for eight years.

Grand Luxxe in Riviera Maya, Mexico received AAA Five Diamond in 2017. Grand Luxxe in Nuevo Vallarta, Mexico received the AAA's Five Diamond rating for a third year in a row in 2018.

In 2019, Vidanta Nuevo Vallarta was named one of the Top 100 hotels in the world in Travel + Leisure magazine's ‘World’s Best’ award series. It also featured in the list of the Top 10 hotels in Mexico. Vidanta Riviera Maya was recognised as one of the Top 5 hotels in Eastern Mexico in Conde Nast Traveler's 2019 Readers’ Choice Awards. In 2019, Grupo Vidata was named one of the 500 Most Important Companies in Mexico by Grupo Expansión magazine.
