= Vidanta =

Mexican luxury resort chain

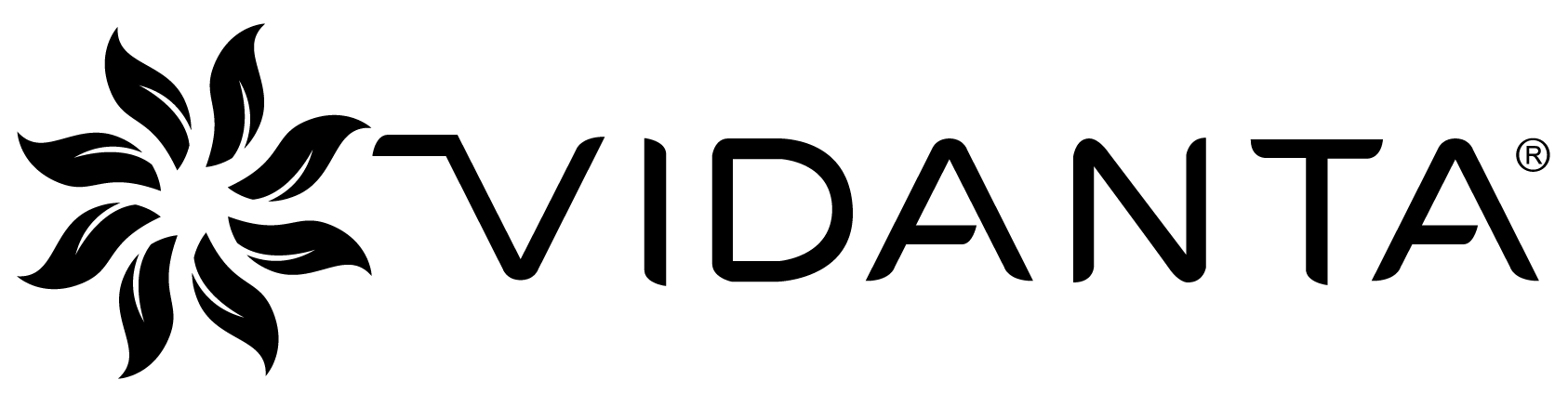

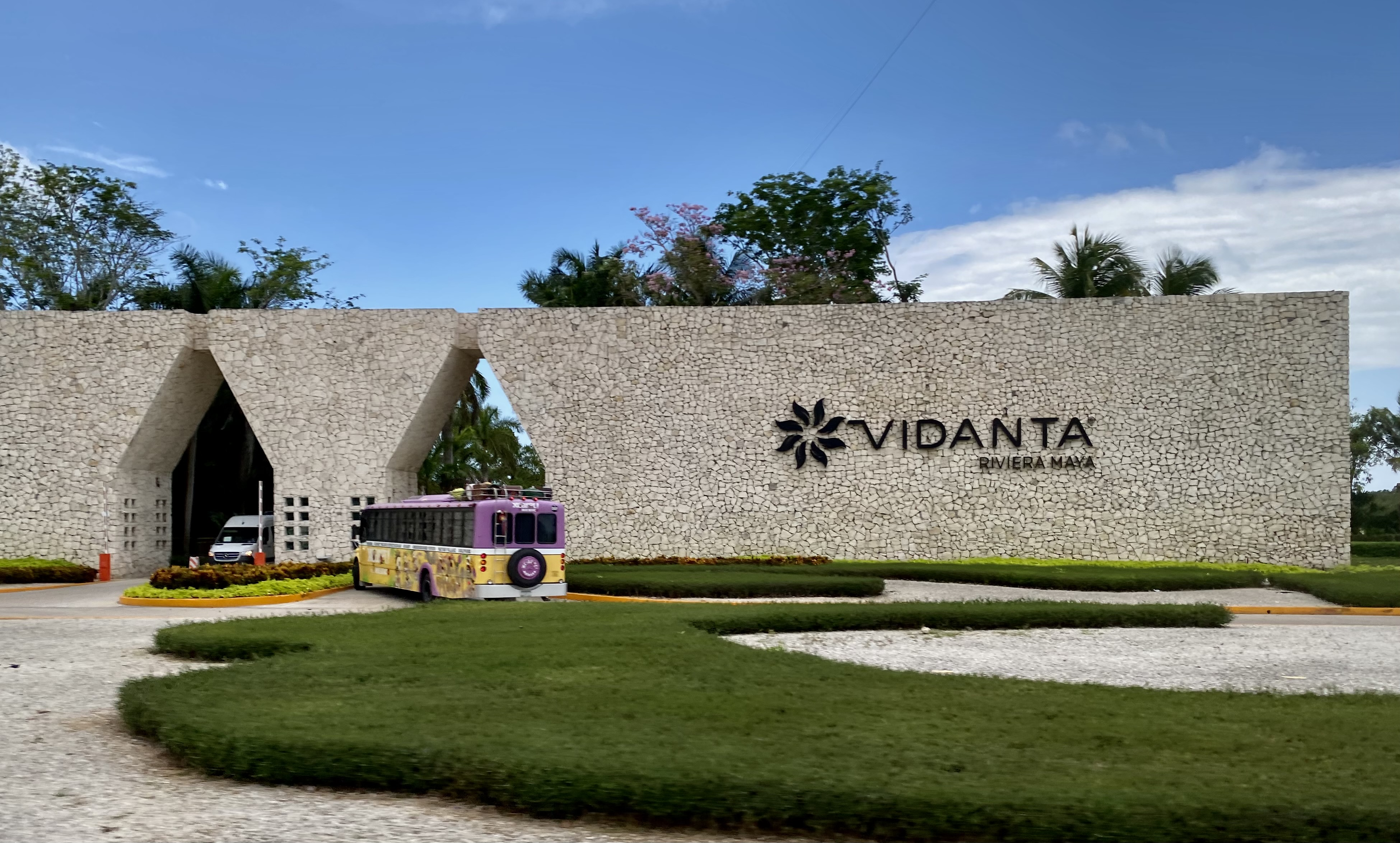
- Industry: Hospitality, resorts
- Area served: Mexico
- Parent: Grupo Vidanta
- Website: www.vidanta.com

Vidanta is a Mexican luxury resort chain owned and managed by Grupo Vidanta. It manages resort hotels, golf courses and theme parks in the coastal regions of Mexico. Since 2022, PGA Tour’s Mexico Open is hosted at its resort in Nuevo Vallarta.

== Resort locations ==
Vidanta's resorts are located in Nuevo Vallarta, Riviera Maya, Acapulco, Puerto Penasco, Los Cabos, and Puerto Vallarta. Its resort brands include:

- The Estates
- Grand Luxxe
- The Grand Bliss
- The Grand Mayan
- The Bliss
- Mayan Palace
- Vidanta World
  - Vidanta Nuevo Vallarta

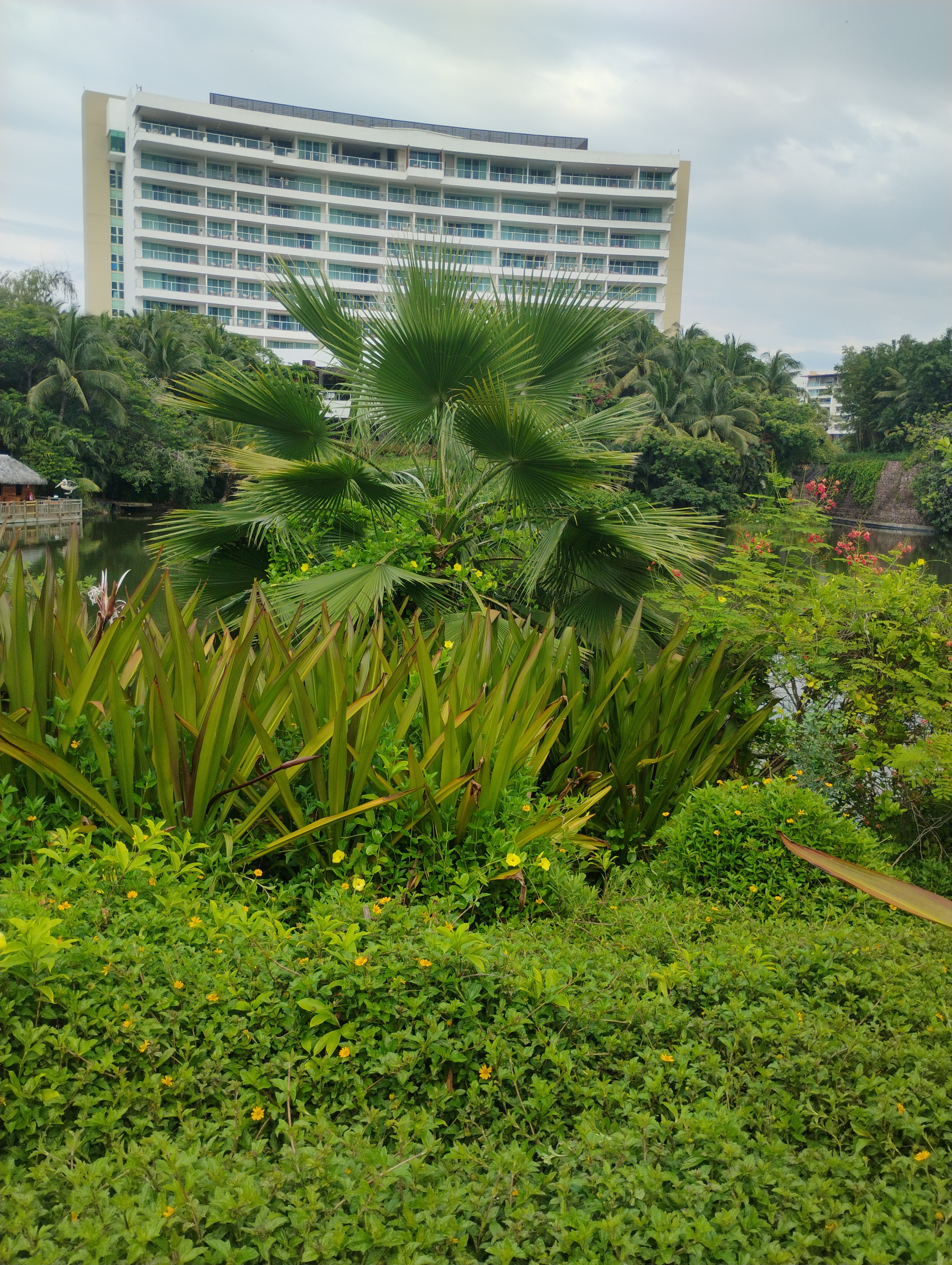
Vegetation at Mayan Palace

== Entertainment ==
The resort at Vidanta Riviera Maya features Jungala Aqua Experience, a luxury waterpark, and Cirque du Soleil JOYÀ, the first resident show by Cirque du Soleil in Latin America.

== Golf ==
Vidanta manages seven golf courses in Mexico, including one of the biggest golf courses in the country, stretching over 2,500 acres. Since 2022, PGA Tour’s Mexico Open at Vidanta is conducted in the Vidanta Vallarta course in association with Grupo Salinas. Past winners who have played at the course include Tony Finau and Jake Knapp in 2023 and 2024 respectively.

== Awards and recognition ==
Grand Luxxe in Nuevo Vallarta and Riviera Maya has received the AAA Five Diamond Award.

Vidanta Riviera Maya was ranked among the top resorts in Mexico in Condé Nast Traveler's Readers' Choice Awards in 2019, 2020, and 2021. The latter was ranked among the top 15 hotels in Mexico by Travel + Leisure in 2019.

In 2020, Jungala was awarded the Leading Edge Award by the World Waterpark Association for its unique water attractions.

In 2021, Vidanta Nuevo Vallarta, Vidanta Riviera Maya, and Vidanta Los Cabos were included in the list of top 500 hotels and resorts in the world by Travel + Leisure.

In 2022, the resorts in Nuevo Vallarta and Riviera Maya were included in the 25 best resort hotels in Mexico by Travel + Leisure.

In 2022, Vidanta Vallarta course was awarded the 2022 Renovation of the Year by Golf Magazine.
