= List of ship launches in 1990 =

The list of ship launches in 1990 includes a chronological list of all ships launched in 1990.

Date	Ship	Class / type	Builder	Location	Country	Notes
12 January	Dolphin Caravelle	cruise ship	Rauma Yards	Rauma	Finland	For Delfin Risteilyt Oy
26 January	Sendai	Abukuma-class destroyer escort			Japan	
13 February	Renaissance Five		Nuovi Cantieri Apuania	Marina di Carrara	Italy	
24 February	Asheville	Los Angeles-class submarine	Newport News Shipbuilding	Newport News, Virginia	United States	
2 March	Wega	de:Vermessungs-, Wracksuch- und Forschungsschiffe des BSH	Kröger-Werft	Schacht-Audorf	West Germany	For Federal Ministry of Transport and Digital Infrastructure
16 March	Triton	Thetis-class patrol vessel	Svendborg Shipyard	Svendborg	Denmark	
20 March	Natsushio	Harushio-class submarine			Japan	
29 March	Regal Princess	Cruise ship	Fincantieri	Monfalcone	Italy	For Princess Cruises
9 April	City of Westminster	Dredger	Appledore Shipbuilders	Appledore	United Kingdom	For United Marine Dredgers Ltd.
12 April	Lütje Hörn	Nordstand-class tug	Husumer Schiffswerft	Husum	West Germany	For German Navy
21 April	John Ericsson	Henry J. Kaiser-class replenishment oiler	Sun Shipbuilding & Drydock Company	Chester, Pennsylvania	United States	
28 April	Hoverspeed France	WPC74 class fast ferry	Incat	Hobart, Tasmania	Australia	For Hoverspeed
April	Chang Zheng 5	Type 091 nuclear-powered attack submarine	Huludao Shipyard	Huludao, Liaoning	China	
2 May	Álvares Cabral	Vasco da Gama-class frigate	HDW	Kiel	West Germany	
24 May	Lancaster	Type 23 frigate	Yarrow Shipbuilders	Glasgow	United Kingdom	
25 May	Golden Odyssey	luxury yacht	Blohm + Voss	Hamburg	West Germany	For Chalid ibn Sultan
31 May	Lady Moura	luxury yacht	Blohm + Voss	Hamburg	West Germany	
May	Bell Pioneer	open-top container ship	Teraoka	Nandan	Japan	For Bell Lines; IMO 8907668
1 June	Hué City	Ticonderoga-class cruiser	Ingalls Shipbuilding	Pascagoula, Mississippi	United States	
12 June	Fort Victoria	Fleet replenishment ship	Harland & Wolff	Belfast	United Kingdom	For Royal Fleet Auxiliary.
17 June	Frontier Spirit	cruise ship	Mitsubishi Heavy Industries	Kobe	Japan	For Frontier Cruises
23 June	Alexandria	Los Angeles-class submarine	Electric Boat	Groton, Connecticut	United States	
June	Shalki	Type 209 submarine	Mazagon Dock Limited	Mumbai	India	For Indian Navy
7 July	Aethalia	Ferry	Fincantieri-Cantieri Nav. Italiani S.p.A.	Palermo	Italy	For Toremar
21 July	George Washington	Nimitz-class aircraft carrier	Newport News Shipbuilding	Newport News, Virginia	United States	
11 August	Kentucky	Ohio-class submarine	Electric Boat	Groton, Connecticut	United States	
17 August	Jefferson City	Los Angeles-class submarine	Newport News Shipbuilding	Newport News, Virginia	United States	
23 August	Scharhörn	Nordstand-class tug	Husumer Schiffswerft	Husum	West Germany	For German Navy
4 September	Narwal	submarine	Abeking & Rasmussen	Lemwerder	West Germany	For German Navy
8 September	Shiloh	Ticonderoga-class cruiser	Bath Iron Works	Bath, Maine	United States	
22 September	Kanawha	Henry J. Kaiser-class replenishment oiler	Sun Shipbuilding & Drydock Company	Chester, Pennsylvania	United States	
27 September	Knechtsand	Nordstand-class tug	Husumer Schiffswerft	Husum	West Germany	For German Navy
6 October	Floréal	Floréal-class frigate	Chantiers de l'Atlantique	Saint-Nazaire	France	
6 October	Supply	Supply-class fast combat support ship	National Steel & Shipbuilding	San Diego, California	United States	
16 October	Regent Sky	ferry	Stocznia im Lenina	Gdańsk	Poland	For Regency Cruises
2 November	Anzio	Ticonderoga-class cruiser	Ingalls Shipbuilding	Pascagoula, Mississippi	United States	
5 November	Britannia Beaver	Dredger	Appledore Shipbuilders	Appledore	United Kingdom	For NatWest Leasing.
15 November	Silja Symphony	cruiseferry	Masa-Yards Turku New Shipyard	Turku	Finland	For Silja Line
18 December	Toronto	Halifax-class frigate	Saint John Shipbuilding	Saint John, New Brunswick	Canada	
21 December	Vædderen	Thetis-class patrol vessel	Svendborg Shipyard	Svendborg	Denmark	
Unknown date	Crown Monarch	Cruise ship	Unión Naval de Levante	Valencia	Spain	Crown Cruise Line
Unknown date	Goldfinder	Fishing trawler	David Abels Boatbuilders	Bristol	United Kingdom	For Graham Perkes.
Unknown date	Maid of the Lakelands	Ferry	David Abels Boatbuilders	Bristol	United Kingdom	For Brownsea Island Ferries
Unknown date	Sun Bright	General cargo ship				
Unknown date	Saint Edmund KL	Buoy tender	David Abels Boatbuilders	Bristol	United Kingdom	For King's Lynn Conservancy Board.
