= VidantaWorld =

Resorts, entertainment parks and yachts, Mexico

- Type: Subsidiary
- Industry: Entertainment, Hospitality
- Founded: 2014
- Founder: Daniel Chávez Morán
- Number of locations: 2 Resorts (2024), 1 Yacht (2024)
- Area served: Mexico, Caribbean, Mediterranean Sea
- Products: Hotels, Theme Parks, Luxury Yachts, Aquaparks
- Parent: Grupo Vidanta
- Website: www.vidantaworld.com

VidantaWorld is a luxury tourism and world-class entertainment brand developed by Grupo Vidanta, a Mexican company founded in 1974 by Daniel Chávez Morán. It brings together hospitality, dining, entertainment, golf, and wellness across destinations including Riviera Maya and Vallarta–Nuevo Nayarit, while extending its reach to the Mediterranean through VidantaWorld Voyages, with itineraries aboard VidantaWorld’s ELEGANT.

Upscale entertainment is a core element of the VidantaWorld experience, brought to life through a portfolio of attractions and experiences across its destinations. At VidantaWorld Riviera Maya, Jungala Aqua Experience offers a low-density water park experience that combines extreme and high-speed water attractions with private cabanas, food and beverage offerings, and spa services.

Entertainment at VidantaWorld has also been shaped by a strategic partnership with Cirque du Soleil that began in 2014 with JOYÀ at VidantaWorld Riviera Maya and has since grown to include two resident productions in Latin America. JOYÀ brings together live performance, gastronomy, and immersive design in an experience created specifically for the destination and presented in a purpose-built theater.

The collaboration expanded to VidantaWorld Vallarta–Nuevo Nayarit in December 2025 with LUDÕ, the second Cirque du Soleil resident production developed in partnership with VidantaWorld. Inspired by water, LUDÕ combines acrobatics and underwater artistry, gastronomy, and immersive storytelling inside a purpose-built theater surrounded by aquarium walls and offering nearly 360-degree views. LUDÕ also serves as a gateway to BON Luxury Theme Park (opening in phases from 2026 to 2027), the world’s first luxury theme park, featuring more than 20 attractions alongside themed environments, technology, nature, and gastronomy.

With an investment of more than $1.5 billion, BON Luxury Theme Park reflects Grupo Vidanta’s strategy of bringing the principles of luxury hospitality to the theme park industry. Its approach includes intentionally limited capacity to create a less crowded experience, dedicated spaces for relaxation, and world-class full-service restaurants, all designed as part of an integrated experience that aims to establish a new category of entertainment on an international scale.

VidantaWorld’s vision for transforming the vacation experience also extends beyond land. Through VidantaWorld Voyages, the company has brought its approach to hospitality and entertainment to the sea, launching the division with VidantaWorld’s ELEGANT, a luxury mega yacht that embarked on its inaugural voyage in spring 2026. Originally configured to accommodate more than 600 passengers, the vessel was redesigned for no more than 190 guests, providing greater space per guest, personalized service, and extended stays in port.

VidantaWorld’s reach extends to air travel as well through Mar de Cortés International Airport, an uncommon asset within the tourism industry. Built by Grupo Vidanta and completed in 2009, the airport provides direct access to Vidanta Puerto Peñasco while strengthening air connectivity to one of the Mar de Cortés region’s key tourism destinations.

Golf also plays an important role within VidantaWorld. Since its inaugural edition in 2021, the Mexico Open has evolved into the VidantaWorld Mexico Open, an official PGA Tour event that celebrates its fifth edition at Vallarta–Nuevo Nayarit in 2026, bringing together some of the world’s leading golf talent. The 2026 edition also marks a new chapter for VidantaWorld, which for the first time serves as the tournament’s title sponsor, operator, and host.

Live music is another key part of the VidantaWorld entertainment offering through VidantaWorld Concert Series, which has welcomed world-class artists since its launch in 2022, including Marc Anthony, Lionel Richie, Michael Bublé, Alejandro Fernández, Sebastián Yatra, Juanes, and Morat, among others. The 2026 lineup continues with performances by Robbie Williams and Maroon 5 at VidantaWorld Vallarta–Nuevo Nayarit.

VidantaWorld represents Grupo Vidanta’s expansion into an integrated destination model that brings together accommodations, entertainment, gastronomy, sports, wellness, and travel experiences.

== History ==
VidantaWorld began as a theme park, initially focused on family-friendly attractions. Over time, Grupo Vidanta, the company behind VidantaWorld, shifted its focus to meet the growing demand for luxury travel. This led to the transformation of the resort to include expanded accommodation, dining, and entertainment. Over time, VidantaWorld grew to include new resorts and a variety of entertainment and recreational activities. The rebranding to VidantaWorld reflected this shift from a theme park model to a broader hospitality and entertainment brand, designed to cater to affluent travelers. In 2024, VidantaWorld consists of two resorts with entertainment parks, and a luxury yacht. VidantaWorld's resorts opened their doors to guests on 18 October 2024. The Beauty of Nature theme park is set to soft open on October 24, 2026, before its public opening in April 2027.

== Development ==
Concept art

=== Nuevo Vallarta ===
On November 12, 2014, Cirque du Soleil, Grupo Vidanta and Legacy Entertainment announced a plan for a theme park in Nuevo Vallarta, Mexico. This includes at least two lands, the Village of the Sun and the Village of the Moon, and an outdoor evening show accommodating 3,000 to 5,000 spectators. It has water park and nature park elements. Construction began in September 2015. On November 30, 2015, Goddard Group released concept drawings for a previously unannounced water park.

In April 2021, the operator announced the plan of a fantasy-themed park, a water park, and a nature park, all connected to the Vidanta Nuevo Vallarta resort hotel and the beach by an aerial lift. Among many of its themes are a realm dedicated to Cirque du Soleil and the SkyDream Parks Gondola to provide transportation between the parks and the hotels on a loop of 4 miles (6.4 km) long and 150 feet (46 m) high.

Launch was anticipated for 2018, but was delayed until 2023. BON: Beauty of Nature park opened for previews on August 1, 2023. The park opened with limited amenities available, including attractions, midway games, restaurants and retail.

=== Riviera Maya ===
In 2019, Grupo Vidanta announced the construction of a waterpark called Jungala Luxury Waterpark. Built on the site of VidantaWorld Riviera Maya, Jungala Luxury Waterpark was one of the first components of the resort. With a focus on high-end experiences and "sophisticated attractions", Jungala Luxury Waterpark plans featured VIP cabins, spa treatments and "gourmet cuisine".

=== Elegant ===
In March 2019, Grupo Vidanta announced an investment for 2.7 billion Mexican pesos (approximately $143,937,000 USD) into a luxury shipping fleet. The first in the fleet was Vidanta Elegant, later rebranded as VidantaWorld Elegant. After being acquired by Grupo Vidanta, the Elegant was extensively renovated into a luxury mega yacht for guest bookings.

== VidantaWorld Locations ==
Locations of VidantaWorld Locations

=== Riviera Maya ===
Located on the Mexican Caribbean coast, this resort offers beachfront access, dining options, golf courses, and access to attractions, like Cirque du Soleil's Joyà and the Jungala Aqua Experience, which offers water slides, a lazy river, and private cabanas.

=== Nuevo Vallarta ===
Situated in a jungle environment, this resort includes attractions like Cirque du Soleil's show Ludõ show and the BON Luxury Theme Park. It also features pools and other recreational facilities.

=== VidantaWorld Voyages ===
VidantaWorld's ELEGANT is a mega-yacht operated by VidantaWorld. The yacht features staterooms and suites, multiple dining options, and deck-top pools. Elegant is over 500 feet (152.4 Meters) long, with six decks, 149 staterooms and 13 restaurants and lounges, and sails throughout the Caribbean and Europe.
