= Indrė Šerpytytė =

Lithuanian artist

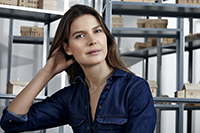
- Šerpytytė at her studio in London, 2015
- Born: 1983 (age 42–43); Palanga, Lithuania
- Education: Royal College of Art and University of Brighton
- Known for: Contemporary Art, Fine Art Photography
- Notable work: 150 mph, 2 Seconds of Colour, (1944 – 1991), Drancy, A State of Silence
- Awards: The Arts Foundation, Rencontres d’Arles, Magenta Foundation Flash Forward, National Media Museum, Hoopers Gallery, Metro Imaging, Fujifilm Distinction Award, Terry O’Neill Award, Jerwood Foundation
- Website: indre-serpytyte.com

Indrė Šerpytytė ([ˈɪn.dʲɾʲeː ˈɕɛɾʲ.pʲiː.tʲiː.tʲeː]; born 1983) is a Lithuanian artist living and working in London. Šerpytytė is concerned with the impact of war on history and perception, and works with photography, sculpture, installation and painting.

Her work is held by the Victoria and Albert Museum, Roberts Institute of Art and Derwent London and have been exhibited at Tate Modern, The Museum of Modern Art (MoMA), The Photographers' Gallery, Museum of Contemporary Art in Kraków and Museum Folkwang, among others.

== Life and work ==
Šerpytytė was born in 1983 in Palanga, Lithuania and moved to London at the age of 14. She received her MA in photography from The Royal College of Art, London and her BA in editorial photography from the University of Brighton.

=== (1944 – 1991) ===
Former NKVD - MVD - MGB - KGB Buildings (2009 - 2015, ongoing) centres on the after-effects of World War II in Lithuania. These black and white images tell an almost forgotten story of the domestic conflicts of war, in which people were interrogated and tortured in what were once family homes. Rather than representing the buildings themselves, or showing the inhabitants or victims directly, Šerpytytė uses commissioned, hand-carved wooden models based on archival research and site visits to comment on both the physical and humanitarian scale of the conflict and to recall events that have faded over time. From the same series, Forest Brothers (2009) looks at the Lithuanian forest as a place both to hide and to disappear as it revisits the environments once home to the period's most active resistance force.

=== A State of Silence ===
A State of Silence (2006) pays tribute to the artist's father, Albinas Šerpytis, Lithuania's Head of Government Security, who died in suspicious circumstances in a car accident in the early hours of October 13, 2001.

=== 2 Seconds of Colour ===
The large scale photographic palettes of 2 Seconds of Colour arise from a Google Image search for the term ‘Isis beheadings’. The works present the patchwork of rectangular placeholders automatically generated while the page is loading, their colours extracted from the 'black of the executioner’s garments, the orange of the victim’s jumpsuit [or] the blue of the sky’. Responding to the oversaturated media landscape in which they find themselves, the images 'seeking to break the closed circuit between violence that is thoughtlessly executed and violence that is thoughtlessly consumed'.

=== 150 mph ===
The 150 mph paintings depart from images of individuals jumping from New York's World Trade Center during the September 11 attacks. Each image’s human subject has been removed leaving the architecture itself as sole "witness and unintentional memorial."

== Publications ==
=== Publications by Šerpytytė ===
- (1944 – 1991). London: self-published, 2010. ISBN 9780956691705. Includes an interview with Martin Barnes and a text by Nigel Rolfe.

=== Publications with others ===
- Pokario Istorijos / Post-war Stories. Kaunas, Lithuania: Lithuanian Photographers’ Association Kaunas Department, 2015. By Šerpytytė ("Forest Brothers: Former NKVD-MVD-MGB-KGB Buildings"), Claudia Heinermann ("Wolf Children") and Michal Iwanowski ("Clear of People"). ISBN 9786098099126. With a text by Sonya Winterberg ("Wolf Children"). Published to accompany an exhibition. English and Lithuanian language.

== Awards ==
- Jerwood Photography Award, Jerwood Visual Arts, Jerwood Foundation, 2006
- The Terry O’Neill Award, 2007
- The Fujifilm Distinction Award, 2008
- National Media Museum Photography Bursary, 2009
- Hoopers Gallery Prize, 2009
- Metro Imaging Prize, 2009
- Magenta Foundation Flash Forward Prize, 2010
- Nominated for the Rencontres d’Arles Discovery Award by Simon Baker, Tate Senior Curator, International Art (Photography), 2011
- Shortlisted for The Arts Foundation’s Still Life Photography Award, 2013

== Exhibitions ==
=== Solo exhibitions ===
- The Embassy of the Republic of Lithuania, London, 2009.
- Camera 16, Milan, 2010
- Vilniaus Fotografijos Galerija, Vilnius, 2011
- The Photographers' Gallery, London, 2010
- Ffotogallery, Penarth, 2013;
- Kraków Photomonth Festival, Museum of Contemporary Art in Kraków (MOCAK), 2015

=== Group exhibitions ===
- The Photographers' Gallery, London
- Victoria and Albert Museum, London
- Rencontres d’Arles, Arles, France, 2011
- National Gallery of Art, Vilnius, 2013
- Street Level Photoworks, Glasgow, UK
- Conflict, Time, Photography, Tate Modern, London, 2014–2015.
- Museum Folkwang, Essen, 2015
- Tbilisi Photo Festival
- Ocean of Images, Museum of Modern Art (MoMA), New York, 2015–2016

== Collections ==
Šerpytytė 's work is held in the following public collections:

- Victoria and Albert Museum, London
- Roberts Institute of Art, London
- The collection of Jay Jopling, London
- Derwent London, London
