= Paul Gaffney =

Irish photographer

Paul Gaffney (born 1979) is an Irish landscape photographer. His book We Make the Path by Walking was made on long distance walks across southern Europe.

== Life and work ==
Gaffney gained a diploma in documentary photography from the University of Wales, Newport and an MFA in photography from Ulster University in Belfast.

His first book, We Make the Path by Walking (self-published, 2013), is a collection of landscape photographs made on walking trips through rural Spain, Portugal, and France. long-distance walking, as a form of meditation and personal change, was integral to his creative practice. In total Gaffney walked more than 3,500 kilometres. The book Stray (2016) was photographed in a dense pine forest in almost total darkness. The book Perigee (2017) was also made in forests, photographed by the light of the full moon.

== Publications ==
- We Make the Path by Walking. Self-published, 2013. Includes the poem "Caminante no hay camino" by Antonio Machado. Edition of 1000 copies.
- Stray. Self-published, 2016. Edition of 50 copies.
- Perigee. Self-published in association with National Audiovisual Centre, Luxembourg, 2017. Two books in an edition of 750 copies.

== Exhibitions ==
=== Solo exhibitions or with one other ===
- Paul Gaffney/Michal Iwanowski, Ffotogallery, Turner House Gallery, Penarth, Wales, February–March 2014. We Make the Path by Walking by Gaffney and Clear of People by Michal Iwanowski.
- Perigee, Photo Museum Ireland, Dublin, October–November 2019

== See also ==
- Walking Artists Network
