= Magenta Foundation =

Canadian charitable art publishing house

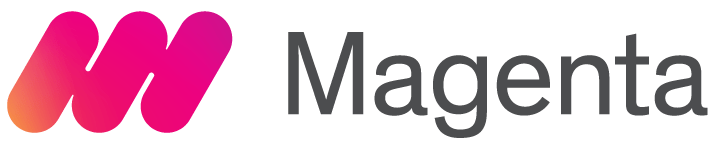
- Founded: 2004
- Founder: MaryAnn Camilleri
- Country of origin: Canada
- Headquarters location: Toronto, Canada
- Distribution: University of Toronto Press Thames & Hudson
- Nonfiction topics: Art and photography publishing
- Official website: www.magentafoundation.org

The Magenta Foundation is a charitable art publishing house based in Toronto. It was established in 2004 by MaryAnn Camilleri to publish work from both domestic and international emerging artists through exhibitions and publications. In 2005 the foundation produced its first book, Carte Blanche Vol.1: Photography, with the proceeds supporting the promotion and publication of work by artists between the ages of 13 and 25. Magenta publications and exhibitions are circulated in Canada and abroad, and the foundation brings international contemporary art to Canadian audiences.

In its 17 years, the foundation has created new arts programming in Canada to help change the visual arts community. Through festivals, competitions, pop-up exhibits, and programming, the foundation has undergone many iterations since it started as a publishing house in 2004.

== History ==
After a decade working in New York, Camilleri returned to Toronto in 2004 and decided to create a photography compendium featuring Canadian photographers. In 2005, the foundation produced its first book, Carte Blanche Vol.1: Photography, a five pound coffee table sized book. A nationwide call for submissions was put out, and by the December 2004 deadline, there were more than 1,100 submissions for Carte Blanche. Carte Blanche was the first time 230 Canadian photographers were highlighted in one publication. In tandem with creating the compendium, an emerging artists competition, Flash Forward, was formed. Over the years, the Flash Forward competition has become a staple of the foundation. In 2008, the Toronto Star referred to Camilleri as "a one-woman publishing powerhouse."

Following the completion of Camilleri's first independent projects, Flash Forward and Carte Blanche, the Magenta Foundation was born. Since then, the foundation has developed a global network of like-minded individuals and organizations, which helps to bring international contemporary art to Canadian audiences and increase the profile of under-documented emerging artists.

Artwork submitted to Magenta's Flash Forward Competition for Emerging Artists has received international media coverage, with photos appearing in publications including The Guardian, The Washington Post, the Globe and Mail, and NPR.

== Flash Forward Competition for Emerging Artists ==
Since 2004 The Magenta Foundation has hosted an annual photography competition, open to photographers in Canada, the United States, and the United Kingdom. The competition has successfully awarded more than $150,000 in cash awards and launched over 1,500 artists during its run from 2004 to 2019. Flash Forward is a career boost for young emerging photographers, and it is known as a reputable contest that gets artwork seen by a large group of people and launches careers in the arts.

In 2017, the competition was opened up to photographers anywhere in the world. In 2018 special interest categories were introduced to the competition, which have included racial issues, LGBTQ+, and indigenous photographers. In 2019 four of the jurors of the Flash Forward competition withdrew in protest at the competition's financial sponsorship by TD Bank, in light of its financing the Dakota Access Pipeline. The Flash Forward Competition ran for 15 years before ending in 2019. Flash Forward prize winners include Indrė Šerpytytė, Glenna Gordon, Lewis Bush, Simon Roberts, and Jessica Eaton.

Flash Forward jurors are influential photo editors, curators, and industry leaders, including Clare Vander Meersch of the Globe and Mail, Chloe Coleman of The Washington Post, Paul Moakley of Time Magazine, Liz Ikiriko of Toronto Life, Genevieve Fussell of the New Yorker, Lori Morgan of Air Canada's enRoute magazine, and Devan Patel of Patel Brown Gallery.

== Flash Forward Incubator Program ==
In 2012, Magenta introduced the Flash Forward Incubator Program, a digital-photography program for Canadian high school students. The incubator is an extension of high school arts programming that prepares students for a transition out of high school and into a career in the arts. The Incubator program is a nationwide initiative of gallery shows, publications, and festival partnerships. Youth are mentored through all stages of their photography-based project, from conception to production to presentation. The program has been designed to support critical and creative thinking, and to help students develop their work to show in a professional exhibition. Designed for high school students in grades 10 to 12, the program is developed in collaboration with industry professionals and educators.

Throughout the program, students partake in activities that are reflective of a real world experience in the arts: research, proposal writing, critical reviews, artist statements, and a form submission process like those for festivals, gallery shows, and grants. Students who participate in the program have a signature piece for their portfolios and a publication produced by Magenta Foundation. The program culminates in a series of exhibitions that raise funds through silent auctions. Exhibitions have been held in Vancouver, Calgary, Toronto, and Newfoundland. In 2019, 400 students from nearly 30 schools took part in the program. Due to COVID-19, in 2021 the program was developed as a virtual program.

More than 6,500 students have participated in the Incubator Program to date.

== Flash Forward Festivals ==
Since 2010, Magenta has hosted Flash Forward Festivals. Started in Liberty Village, the Canadian festival expanded to Boston where it ran for six years. The Boston Flash Forward Festival was a four-day celebration of art and photography with a series of exhibitions, parties, lectures, and discussions from professional guidance to lessons in theory and practice. "A big, flashy festival is coming to town, and it's coming from Canada," Art New England wrote in 2012. In 2013, at the Boston Flash Forward Festival, a 500-foot strip of photography was set up at the Rose Kennedy Greenway called The Fence. The open-air event attracted more than half a million people.

== Flash Forward Flashback ==
Flash Forward Flashback is an online publication launched to feature past and present Flash Forward winners through profiles and highlights. Flashback invites guest editors to present photographers whose work they admire and host discussions relating to the medium and its usages.

== Magenta POP ==
Magenta held pop-up art exhibits in Vancouver and Pittsburgh, known as Magenta POP. Their pop-ups brought creativity to outdoor public spaces in international locations in an effort to reach more people and unite artists and arts communities. In 2015, Pittsburgh's August Wilson Center hosted the international photography project Humanæ by Brazilian artist Angelica Dass, in partnership with Magenta. Pittsburgh's chapter of the exhibit was subtitled I AM AUGUST.

== /edition Toronto ==
Magenta hosts the /edition Toronto Art Book Fair in tandem with Art Toronto, Canada's International Art Fair. The art fair showcases projects by artists, publishers, galleries, and organizations who want to advance and strengthen Canadian and International art book initiatives.

Since its inception in 2016, more than 40,000 visitors attended the fair, and 300 Canadian and International vendors presented a diverse selection of mediums and interests. The event was created as a way to support and grow the arts publishing community. Approximately 8,000 visitors attended in the inaugural year. The four-day event is held at the Metro Toronto Convention Centre. For its second iteration in October 2017, the annual event had 11,000 attendees.

The 2020 /edition Toronto was held virtually, and in October 2021, the 6th annual /edition Toronto fair returned in-person at the MTCC. There were 25 booths at /edition in 2021, including Art Metropole and Latitude 53.

== Books ==
Since 2005, Magenta Foundation has published and printed more than 100 books, including artist monographs. Their high quality books feature photography, painting, and all visual arts. The scope of their work includes emerging photographers, mid-career artist monographs, and Indigenous artists.

== Selected bibliography ==
- The Watchers. By Haley Morris-Cafiero. Toronto: Magenta Foundation, 2015. ISBN 978-1-926856-07-0.
- Unperson: Portraits of North Korean Defectors. By Tim Franco. Toronto: Magenta Foundation, 2021. ISBN 978-1-926856162.
- Carte Blanche: Vol. 1, Photography. Toronto: Magenta Foundation, 2006. ISBN 978-0973973907.
- In Guns We Trust. By Jean-Francois Bouchard. Toronto: Magenta Foundation, 2019. ISBN 978-1-926856-13-1.
- Tokyo-Yokosuka 1976–1983. By Greg Girard. Toronto: Magenta Foundation, 2019. ISBN 978-1-926856-14-8.
- The Dead. By Jack Burman. Toronto: Magenta Foundation, 2010. ISBN 978-1-926856-00-1.
- Self & Others: Portrait as Autobiography. By Aline Smithson. Toronto: Magenta Foundation, 2015. ISBN 978-1926856063.
- Under Vancouver: 1972–1982. By Greg Girard. Toronto: Magenta Foundation, 2017. ISBN 978-1926856100.
- The Station Point. By Robert Bourdeau. Toronto: Magenta Foundation, 2011. ISBN 978-0973973983.
- Hanoi Calling: One Thousand Years Now. By Greg Girard. Toronto: Magenta Foundation, 2010. ISBN 978-1-926856-01-8.
- 2nd: The Face of Defeat. By Sandy Nicholson. Toronto: Magenta Foundation, 2008. ISBN 978-0-9739739-4-5.
