= C2 Montréal =

Canadian annual creativity and business conference

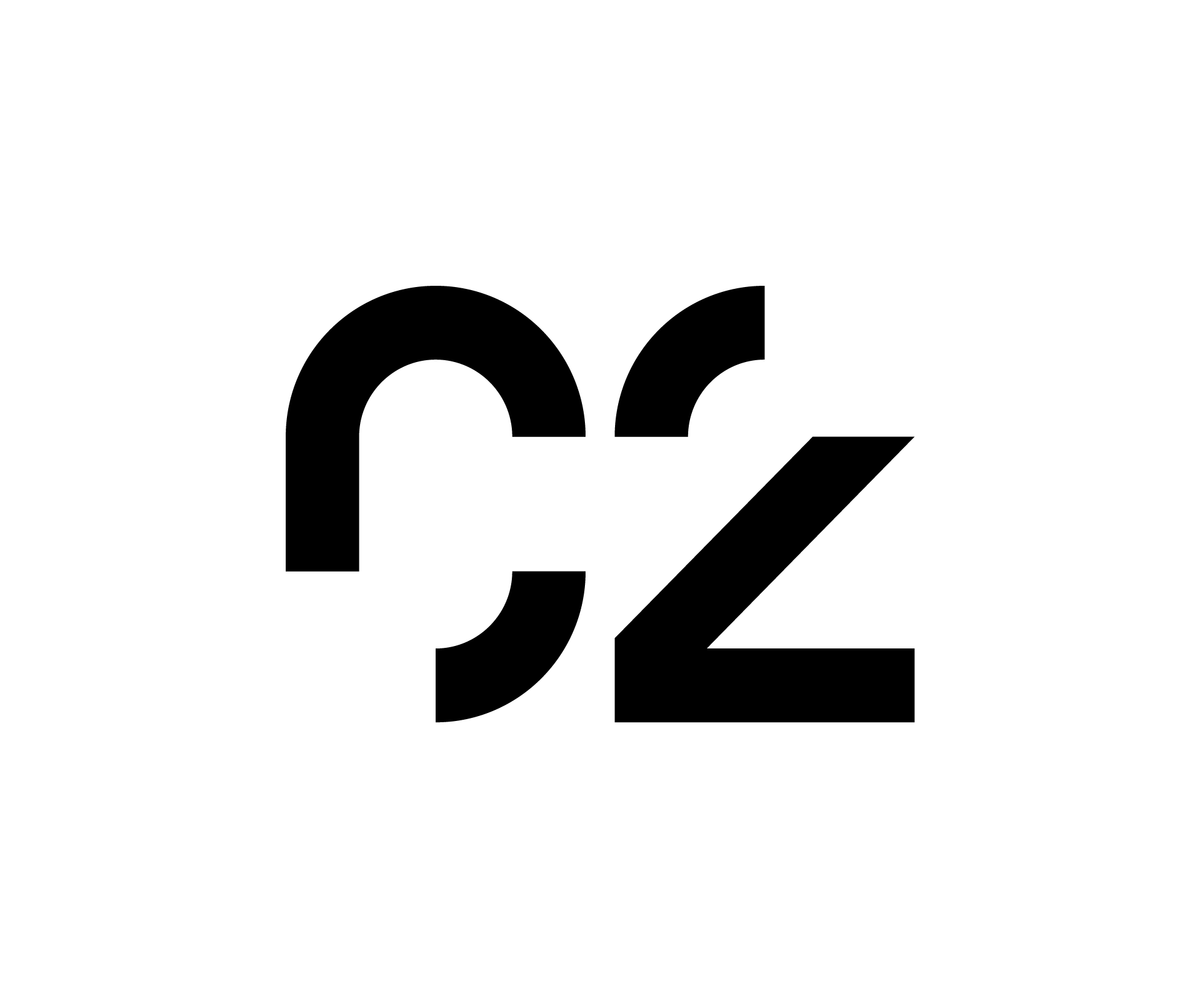
- Status: Active
- Genre: Business conference
- Frequency: Annually
- Location: Montreal
- Country: Canada
- Years active: 9 years
- Inaugurated: 22–25 May 2012 (Montreal)
- Founders: Jean-François Bouchard, Daniel Lamarre
- Most recent: 22–24 May 2019
- Next event: 26-28 September 2022 - C2 Online
- Attendance: 7,500 (2019)
- Leader: Jacques-André Dupont
- Organizer: C2 International
- Website: c2montreal.com

C2 Montréal is a nonprofit organization which holds an annual 3-day international conference in Montreal, Quebec. Its intention is to stimulate the economy in the province of Quebec by facilitating collaboration and networking within the business and creative communities. The conference was conceived by the Montreal-based creative agency Sid Lee in partnership with Cirque du Soleil and has been held every year in May since 2012. C2 Montréal is subsidized by profits generated by C2 International Inc.

== Conference ==
Intended to represent an "intersection of commerce and creativity" (the "Cs" of C2), C2 Montréal was founded in 2012 by Jean-François Bouchard from Sid Lee and Daniel Lamarre from Cirque du Soleil, with Benoît Berthiaume appointed as executive producer at the time. It is held every year in Montreal, Quebec in the month of May. Over 72 partners currently sponsor the conference, including Royal Bank of Canada, Cirque du Soleil, Solotech, BMW, and Facebook. Formal minutes following the conference have been made available since 2015.

The conference requires active participation from the attendees. Participant activities include attending speaker segments, participating in workshops, and one-on-one meetings with other participants (“Braindates by e180”). Due to the media exposure generated by the conference, attending participants are required to agree to a recording and image waiver.

=== Governance ===
Fourteen administrators govern C2 Montréal, two of whom are representatives from the organization's cofounding partners (Sid Lee and Cirque du Soleil).

=== Funding ===
As a nonprofit organization, C2 Montreal receives its funding from corporate sponsors and from the Government of Canada. For its first conference in 2012, the organization received grants totalling 40% of its total budget from the federal government. In 2017, the grants had been reduced to 15% of the organization's total budget as C2 Montréal had successfully secured more significant funding from their private sponsors.

The Canada Economic Development for Quebec Regions, an agency working within the Government of Canada providing assistance to Quebec-based organizations, has awarded a $1.5 million non-repayable grant to C2 Montreal, with half of the amount allocated to the 2018 conference and the other half allocated to the upcoming 2019 conference.

== C2 International Inc. ==
Created in 2015, C2 International Inc. specializes in the facilitation and logistical services for international high-profile events. It is owned by the Montreal-based creative agency Sid Lee. Earnings gained by C2 International finance C2 Montréal. The for-profit company shares expenses with C2 Montréal, which includes employees. C2 International also produces the Movin' On Summit and C2 Melbourne (now cancelled).

=== C2 Melbourne ===
C2 International was preparing for the C2 Melbourne conference, scheduled for October 2018. Arrangements for this event came to a halt upon an announcement from its creator Martin Enault, claiming health issues. It would later be confirmed by current president of C2 Montréal, Richard St-Pierre, that low ticket sales and the retraction of a major partner were the cause of cessation of C2 Melbourne. Thirty employees were discharged from C2 International as a result.

== Criticism ==
Economics professors François Vaillancourt of Université de Montréal and Amine Ouazad of HEC Montréal stated that C2 Montréal's $167.5 million economic impact affirmed in a 2017 study conducted by PricewaterhouseCoopers produced "exaggerated" claims. The professors declared issues with the study, one being that C2 Montréal doesn't follow the method mandated by Tourisme Québec to calculate economic impact, and the other being that the value of the contracts between the participating Québec institutions and C2 Montréal is unknown.
