= Vida Vacations =

Mexican timeshare company

- Company type: Private
- Industry: Hospitality; Resort management
- Founded: 2010
- Headquarters: Nuevo Vallarta, Mexico
- Area served: Mexico
- Products: Vacation membership, club memberships
- Parent: Grupo Vidanta
- Website: www.vidavacations.com

Vida Vacations is a vacation membership company (also referred to as a timeshare or destination club), which allows its customers to purchase a Right to Use and, more recently, a real estate interest in 15 resorts in Mexico. It was founded in 2010 by Grupo Vidanta, and was originally named "Vida Vacation Club". Before that, in the 1990s it was called Vidafel and sold only timeshares. The total number of rooms is approximately 7,000.

Vida Vacations was also formerly known as Mayan Resorts and Grupo Mayan. Resort brands of the company include The Grand Luxxe, The Grand Bliss, The Grand Mayan, The Bliss, Mayan Palace and Sea Garden. It is affiliated with Interval International, allowing exchanges of vacation time at The Grand Bliss Riviera Maya and The Bliss Nuevo Vallarta. It is also affiliated with the Registry Collection (part of the RCI Global Vacation Network, a subsidiary of Wyndham Worldwide), allowing exchanges with Grand Luxxe Nuevo Vallarta and Grand Luxxe Spa Tower Nuevo Vallarta.

== Resort locations ==
- Acapulco
  - The Grand Mayan
  - Mayan Palace
- Los Cabos
  - The Grand Mayan
- Nuevo Vallarta
  - Grand Luxxe
  - The Grand Bliss
  - The Grand Mayan
  - Mayan Palace
- Riviera Maya
  - Grand Luxxe
  - The Grand Bliss
  - The Grand Mayan
  - The Bliss
  - Mayan Palace
- La Jolla de Cortes (Puerto Peñasco)
  - The Grand Mayan
  - Mayan Palace
- Mazatlan
  - Mayan Palace
- Puerto Vallarta
  - Mayan Palace

== See also ==
- Diamond Resorts International
- Marriott Vacation Club
- Occidental Vacation Club
- WorldMark by Wyndham
