= Ffotogallery =

Photography development agency of Wales

- Formation: 1978
- Legal status: Charity
- Purpose: Gallery for lens based media in Wales
- Location: The Old Sunday School, Fanny Street, Cathays, Cardiff, Wales CF24 4EH
- Region served: Wales
- Official language: Welsh and English
- Website: www.ffotogallery.org

Ffotogallery is a gallery for photography in Wales. It was established in 1978 and since June 2019 has been based in Cathays, Cardiff. It also commissions touring exhibitions nationally and internationally. Its current director is Siân Addicott. From 2003 to 2019 Ffotogallery used Turner House Gallery in Penarth as its gallery.

== Background ==
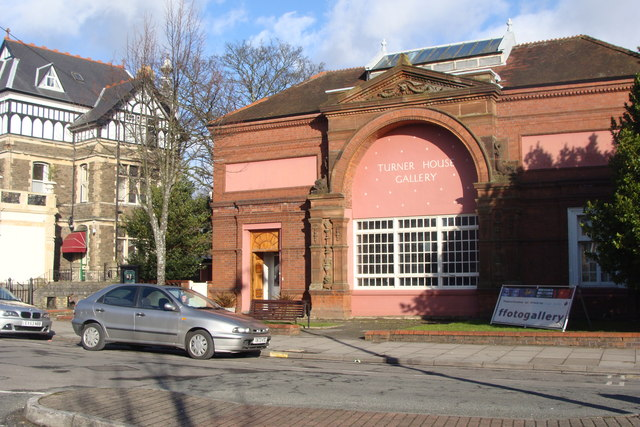
Turner House Gallery in Penarth, Ffotogallery's exhibition space from 2003 to 2019.

Ffotogallery is a gallery and has an exhibition programme featuring artists from Wales and the rest of the world. It features touring exhibitions, collaborations with other organisations and galleries, print and online publishing and an education and outreach programme. Ffotogallery also works with film and video, digital media and installation.

In 2003 it acquired Turner House Gallery in Penarth, near Cardiff, from the National Museum of Wales and used it for photography-based exhibitions. Its administration and education programme was based in Chapter Arts Centre in Cardiff. In 2009 David Drake took over as director, from Chris Coppock who had been director for 19 years.

In 2016 Penarth town council suggested they planned to convert Turner House into a food outlet. In June 2019 Ffotogallery moved to The Old Sunday School on Fanny Street, Cathays, Cardiff.

Ffotogallery receives regular funding from the Arts Council of Wales, for example receiving £198,688 in 2015/16 and a similar amount in 2016/2017.

== Projects ==
Ffotogallery organises Diffusion: Cardiff International Festival of Photography. The biannual festival was held in 2013, focusing on Europe, in 2015 when the title was "Looking for America" and in 2017 when under the theme 'Revolution.' The fourth instalment took place in April 2019 with the theme Sound + Vision, exploring the relationship between sound, photography and lens-based media.

In 2023 Ffotogallery ran a scheme with MADE Cardiff, to support graduate photographers, with a Ffotogallery exhibition to be held in November 2023.

== Commissions ==
Major Ffotogallery commissions made in and about Wales over the last three decades include The Valleys Project, A470 and Barrage. These have featured alongside important new work made in single artist projects such as Keith Arnatt, Josef Koudelka, Peter Finnemore, Willie Doherty, Peter Fraser, Wendy McMurdo, John Davies, Catherine Yass and Bedwyr Williams.

== Exhibitions ==
Some of the exhibitions Ffotogallery has hosted at Turner House include:

- January–February 2004: Urban Dreams, John Davies
- January–February 2008: Niagara, Alec Soth
- August–October 2009: Cockroach Diary and Other Stories, Anna Fox
- March–April 2010: Lost for Words, Peter Fraser
- June–August 2010: Villes/Cities, Raymond Depardon
- November–December 2011: Believing is Seeing, photographs by seven Korean artists
- January–February 2012: Works ion Memory, Daniel Blaufuks
- July–September 2013: Early Photographic Works, Daniel Meadows
- August 2013: Quiet Heroes, Ken Griffiths
- November 2013–January 2014: Stasis, Trine Søndergaard
- March–May 2014: "Day Dreaming About The Good Times?", Paul Reas
- February–March 2014 We make the path by walking, Paul Gaffney; and Clear of People, Michal Iwanowski.
- July–August 2014 The Black Hole & Hiraeth. Janire Nájera and Gareth Phillips.
- March–April 2017: Kanu's Gandhi - rare photographs of Mahatma Gandhi
- June 2017: A Million Mutinies Later, Various
- July–August 2017: The Queen, The Chairman and I
- October–December 2017: Land/Sea, Mike Perry
- January 2018: Still Lives: Consumed, Dawn Woolley

At other venues:

- September–October 2018: Land / Sea, Mike Perry (co-curated with Plymouth Arts Centre) - at Aberystwyth Arts Centre
