= Peter Fraser (photographer) =

British fine art photographer (born 1953)

- Born: 1953 (age 72–73); Cardiff, Wales, UK
- Education: Manchester Polytechnic
- Known for: Fine art photography
- Website: www.peterfraser.net

Peter Fraser (born 1953) is a British fine art photographer. He was shortlisted for the Citigroup Photography Prize (now known as the Deutsche Börse Photography Prize) in 2004.

== Life and career ==
=== Early years ===
Fraser bought his first camera at the age of 7. Fraser went to school in Wales until 1971, then studied Civil Engineering for three months at Hatfield Polytechnic, England, before deciding to study photography. He studied Photography at Manchester Polytechnic between 1972 and 1976, repeating his final year due to becoming seriously ill after crossing the Sahara Desert in early 1975.

=== Photography ===
Fraser was an early adopter of colour photography in the UK, along with Paul Graham, Jem Southam and Martin Parr. He began exhibiting colour photographs in 1982. In 1984, Fraser travelled to Memphis, USA to spend two months with William Eggleston, after meeting him at Eggleston's first UK exhibition opening at the Victoria and Albert Museum the previous year. Despite the historical pressure of the documentary tradition in British photography at this time Fraser was drawn to making photographs which were in each successive series preoccupied with philosophic and metaphysical questions, alluded to by Ian Jeffrey who said:

"...see Peter Fraser, probably the best colourist anywhere now, and as capable with metaphors as any major poet. Fraser’s work is complete, full, in its resonances and layered meanings, rich with the sort of richness you might find in Chardin or Vermeer."

=== 1983–1990 ===
Between 1983 and 1986, Fraser made the exhibitions, Twelve Day Journey, The Valleys Project, Everyday Icons, and Towards an Absolute Zero which led to his first publication Two Blue Buckets in 1988. This book won the Bill Brandt Award hosted by the Photographers' Gallery in 1989 and led to an international audience for Fraser's work. In 1990, Fraser was invited to be the British Artist in Residence in Marseilles, which led to the subsequent exhibition and publication Ice and Water in which, through the shimmering heat of the Mediterranean summer his subject had become the space between and around objects.

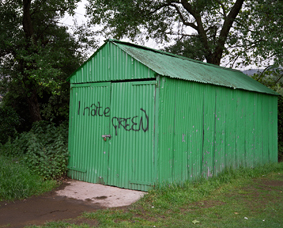
"Untitled" from The Valleys Project, 1985

=== 2000s ===
In 2002 The Photographers' Gallery (London) showed a 20-year overview of Fraser's work, drawing on photographs from a number of his series making a distinction between very large scale 'Images' which became part of the architecture of the gallery space and framed 'Works' hung from the walls. In 2004 Fraser was shortlisted (with Robert Adams, David Goldblatt and Joel Sternfeld) for the Citigroup (formally Citibank) International Photography Prize at the Photographers' Gallery for work which had been exhibited the previous year in the first Brighton Biennial. These photographs were the outcome of a synthesis between two preoccupations, namely his continuing conviction that small things are important, and that the surface of the earth more than ever looks the way it does because the human brain directs the hand to change the shape and nature of materials. This work was subsequently published by Nazraeli Press, USA in 2006. In his text for this book Gerry Badger wrote:

It may seem a long way-and some might feel the connections a mite far fetched-from the simple depiction of objects contained in Peter Fraser’s series, to the universe. But this, nevertheless is what Fraser is asking us to think about as we puzzle over these straightforward yet enigmatic images. In each photograph, he brings a forensic attention upon these everyday objects, yet however elegant each image is in itself, it is the linkages-both causal and casual-we might find between each one, jointly and severally, that we are asked to contemplate. In these relations, Peter Fraser is finding a poetic equivalent not just of the unity of opposites, but also to the simple, obvious yet profound idea expressed by Charles Eames: "Eventually, everything connects."

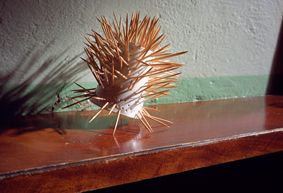
"Untitled" from Nazraeli Monograph (2006)

In early 2006, Fraser was invited to be an Artist in Residence at Oxford University to make new art with photography for the Biochemistry Department. The department had commissioned the demolition of several older buildings in which it was housed, to make way for a newly commissioned landmark building. Fraser visited Oxford twice a month for two and a half years making photographs at first in the midst of the demolition process using lower saturation colour film, and then changing to brighter colour film once the construction phase began. In 2009, Fraser was commissioned by Ffotogallery, Wales, to make new work across the entire country during that year. This resulted in the exhibition and publication Lost For Words, the first time Fraser had worked entirely digitally. These works were shown and published in spring 2010, of which Mark Durden in his accompanying essay observed that:

There is a dark strain running through many of Frasers new pictures. The sensuousness, beauty and idealism in his photography of objects is countered by a sense of the impermanence, incomprehensibility and meaninglessness of things. Objects exist not so much for us but against us, obdurate, enigmatic and other.

In 2012, Fraser exhibited 'A City in the Mind' at Brancolini Grimaldi Gallery, London. This was a series of photographs inspired by Italo Calvino's book Invisible Cities, in which the Tartar Emperor Kublai Khan discusses with Marco Polo cities in his empire Marco has visited on the Emperor's behalf, but for the Emperor can only remain Cities in the Mind.

"In London I have been making work which even though needing physical subjects for the images, collectively suggest a City which we cannot physically visit, but can only in our imagination through the book and exhibitions of the photographs".

In 2013, Tate St Ives exhibited a selected retrospective of Fraser's work, and published a monograph containing photographs from all of Fraser's major series to date, 12 day Journey (1984), Ice and Water (1993), Deep Blue (1997), Lost for Words (2010) and A City in the Mind (2012). This was the first Tate retrospective for a living British photographer working in colour. In 2013, Fraser received an Honorary Fellowship from the Royal Photographic Society. In 2014, Tate purchased 10 works from the mid-1980s for their permanent collection. In 2017, Peperoni Books, based in Berlin, published a new 'Director's Cut' of Fraser's 1988 publication Two Blue Buckets with 19 missing images from the original, and a new essay by Gerry Badger and a discussion between Fraser and David Campany. From 1 June–31 July 2017, Fraser's exhibition Mathematics was exhibited at the Real Jardín Botánico de Madrid, part of PhotoEspana 17, and Skinnerboox, Italy, published Mathematics with 52 colour plates, and essays by Mark Durden, David Campany and an afterword by Fraser.

The first UK exhibition of Mathematics opened at Camden Arts Centre, London, on 5 July and ran until 16 September 2018. The accompanying File Notes no 120 published by the gallery, featured a specially commissioned essay The Things that Count by Amy Sherlock, deputy editor of Frieze.

== Publications ==
- Nazraeli Monograph. Nazraeli Press, 2006. ISBN 1-59005-144-0
- Lost for Words. 2010. ISBN 978-1-872771-79-3
- A City in the Mind. Steidl Brancolini Grimaldi, 2012. ISBN ISBN 978-3-86930-453-3
- Peter Fraser. London: Tate, 2013. Edited by Martin Clark and Sara Matson. ISBN 978-1849761499
- Mathematics. Skinnerboox, 2017. Edition of 750 copies. With texts by Mark Durden and David Campany
- Two Blue Buckets. Cornerhouse Publications, UK, 1988. ISBN 0948797118
- Deep Blue. Viewpoint Photography Gallery, The Ffotogallery, Tullie House, Cambridge Darkroom Gallery, 1997 ISBN 1872771351
- Lost for Words. The Ffotogallery, Wales Ltd, UK ISBN 9781872771793

== Awards ==
- 2004: Shortlisted, Citigroup Photography Prize (now known as the Deutsche Börse Photography Prize)
- 2021: Pollock Krasner Award

== Solo exhibitions ==
- 1982: The Flower Bridge, Impressions Gallery, York, England
- 1983: New Colour, The Photographer's Corridor, University of Wales, Cardiff
- 1984: New Colour, Gallery Oldham, Oldham, England; Arnolfini, Bristol, England
- 1985: 12 Day Journey, Harris Museum, Preston, England; Axiom, Cheltenham, England
- 1986: Everyday Icons, Photographers' Gallery, London; Photo Gallery Hippolyte, Helsinki; toured the United Kingdom
- 1987: Spectrum Galerie, Sprengel Museum, Hannover, Germany
- 1988: Towards an Absolute Zero, Watershed, Bristol, England; Plymouth Arts Centre, Plymouth, England; Ffotogallery, Cardiff, Wales
- 1989: Triptychs, Interim Art, London
- 1993: Ice and Water, Cornerhouse, Manchester, England
- 1995: Ice and Water, Saint Louis Art Museum, Missouri, USA. Ice and Water, James Hockey Gallery, Farnham, England
- 1996: Deep Blue, Stephen Friedman Gallery, London
- 1997-1998: Deep Blue, Viewpoint Gallery, Salford; Ffotogallery, Cardiff; Cambridge Darkroom, Tullie House, Carlisle
- 1999: Peter Fraser, Gallerie 213, Paris
- 2002: Peter Fraser, The Photographers' Gallery, London
- 2003: The Inconsiderable Things, Brighton Photo Biennial, University of Brighton Gallery, England
- 2010: Lost for Words, Ffotogallery, Cardiff, Wales
- 2012: A City in the Mind, Brancolini Grimaldi, London
- 2013: Peter Fraser, Tate Retrospective, St Ives, UK
- 2017: Mathematics, Real Jardin Botanico de Madrid, PhotoEspana
- 2018: Mathematics, Camden Arts Centre, London, UK.

== Collections ==
Fraser's work is held in the following public collections:

- Arts Council of England, London
- The British Council, London
- Contemporary Art Society, London
- Manchester City Art Gallery, UK
- Oldham Art Gallery, England
- Saint Louis Art Museum, St. Louis, Missouri, USA
- Sun Life Collection, National Media Museum, Bradford, England
- Tate, London: 10 prints
- Victoria and Albert Museum, London
- Washington University Art Gallery, St. Louis, Missouri, USA
- Yale Centre for British Art, Yale University, USA
