= Ian Lambot =

British photographer

Ian Lambot (born 1953) is a British architect and photographer mostly known for his photographs of the Kowloon Walled City which he visited hundreds of times between 1985 and its demolition in 1994. Although he initially explored it out of personal interest he later joined forces with Canadian photographer Greg Girard to document this much-maligned corner of Hong Kong, which at the time was the most densely populated place on the planet.

Together they published the book City of Darkness: Life in Kowloon Walled City for the first time in 1993.

== Books ==
- City of Darkness. With Greg Girard. London: Watermark, 1993.
- City of Darkness Revisited. With Greg Girard. London: Watermark, 2014. ISBN 978-1873200889.

== Collection ==
- M+
