= Jean-François Bouchard =

Canadian visual artist

- Born: March 16, 1968 (age 58); Montreal, Quebec, Canada
- Education: University of Ottawa
- Occupations: Photographer, Visual Artist
- Notable work: Exile from Babylon (2023); In Guns We Trust (2019); Transpose (2014); Still Life (2010); Secret Societies (2008); Volvere (2005)
- Website: www.jfbouchard.com

Jean-François Bouchard (born March 16, 1968) is a Canadian lens-based visual artist whose photographic work has been exhibited in Montreal, New York, Tel Aviv, Toronto, Miami, and Paris. He is also co-founder of Sid Lee, the creative services agency he launched with Philippe Meunier in 1993. He later founded C2, a global platform and series of events exploring the intersection between creativity and commerce.

== Background ==
Jean-François Bouchard was born in Montreal in 1968. He attended Collège Notre-Dame, a boarding school, and studied law at the University of Ottawa. Before co-founding the creative company Sid Lee in 1993, he worked as an articled clerk (supervised beginning lawyer) at the Montreal-based Lavery law firm and at the Ministère du Revenu du Québec. Bouchard is also a visual artist and photographer who has exhibited in Montreal, Paris, Miami, and Toronto.

== Career ==
=== Sid Lee ===
Bouchard co-founded the creative services company Diesel/Sid Lee in 1993 with art director Philippe Meunier, whom he met at 16 when they launched a short-lived student newspaper which featured Jane Fonda in its first edition. Some of Sid Lee's first clients were the Greek restaurant near their office, a plumber, Bouchard's dentist, and Sleeman Brewery. In 2006 Diesel was renamed as Sid Lee (an anagram of “diesel”) to avoid confusion with the popular Italian jeans brand, Diesel. Sid Lee went on to collaborate internationally with brands such as Cirque du Soleil, Adidas, The North Face, Absolut Vodka, Videotron, Ubisoft, and many others.

Bouchard was CEO of Sid Lee from 1993 to early 2017, when Bertrand Cesvet took helm of the company after playing a central role in its development since 1997 as the third member of the partnership. The ownership of the company eventually expanded to include more than 30 partners. In 2012, Cirque du Soleil, a long-time partner and client, acquired a significant minority stake in the company. In 2015, Sid Lee was acquired by kyu, the strategic operating unit of the Japanese Hakuhodo DY Holdings to facilitate further expansion.

In 2006, Bouchard was listed among Canada's Top 40 Under 40 and was also named Young Entrepreneur of the Year by the Jeune Chambre de commerce de Montréal (Young Chamber of Commerce).

In 2011, Bouchard was selected along with his partners as the Personality of the Week by La Presse.

=== C2 ===
Bouchard is also the founder and chairman of C2 Montréal, a global innovation conference on commerce and creativity launched with the support of Cirque du Soleil and Stephen and Claudia Bronfman. Notable speakers have included Richard Branson and James Cameron. Described by the European press as the "Davos of creativity," C2 attracts 7,000 executives from 60 countries for its unique mix of talks, workshops, master classes, exhibitions, and festivals.

C2 also produces private events globally for corporations such as EY and Michelin.

C2 also operates a conference venue at the Fairmont Queen Elizabeth Hotel in Montreal.

The company launched C2 Melbourne in Australia in November 2017.

C2 Montréal was selected Most Innovative Event and Best Business Event by Biz Bash in 2015, 2016, and 2017.

On behalf of C2 Montréal, Bouchard interviewed many notable speakers such as Jane Fonda, contemporary artist Daniel Arsham and Marian Goodell (CEO of Burning Man), among others.

Bouchard was selected as one of the most influential leaders in Quebec in the annual ranking published by L'Actualité.

== Photography and visual art ==
Bouchard is a photographer and has held exhibitions in Montreal, Paris, Miami, and Toronto. His photo series Transpose, which features transgender men in various stages of transition, was presented at Arsenal Contemporary (Montreal and Toronto) and awarded the Nannen Prize in 2017. It also received a Pride Photo Award in 2015.

He also received the LUX Award from Infopresse on two occasions.

His previous solo exhibitions have been shown at SAS Gallery and the Sherbrooke Museum, and he has participated in group shows such as Paris Nuit Blanche, Miami Nuit Blanche and Art Souterrain in Montréal.

In April 2019, his exhibition In Guns We Trust was presented at Arsenal Contemporary in New York City. It consisted of photographs and a video installation exploring the very extremes of gun culture in the United States. The Magenta Foundation published a book on these works that is distributed by Thames & Hudson of London. Douglas Coupland wrote the foreword note of the book and curated the exhibition. Artnet chose the exhibition as one of the "Must-See Shows in NYC". This body of work was also featured in The Washington Post, Wired and the British Journal of Photography.

In the Thames & Hudson book, Edward Burtynsky notes: "Through his surreal series of images and installations, Bouchard parses the extremity of this marginalized gun culture at ground zero, their place of worship. In his brief essay, Douglas Coupland brings us a sharp and insightful take on this culture. This book is a must-have for curious minds trying to comprehend the perplexing condition in which we find ourselves."

The Exile from Babylon body of work was presented in New York City as a featured exhibition at the Contact Photography Festival in Toronto in 2023. ArtForum listed the New York exhibition among its Editor’s Picks.

In 2024, PowerHouse Books of New York City published The New Cubans, and exhibitions were presented in the United States and Cuba in the fall.

== Personal life ==
Bouchard is married to Manon Brouillette, former CEO of Verizon Consumer Group, in 2022. They have four children and live in New York City and Montreal.
