= Roberts Institute of Art =

- Formation: 2007; 19 years ago
- Founder: David Roberts
- Type: Non-profit contemporary arts organisation
- Headquarters: London
- Website: www.therobertsinstituteofart.com

The Roberts Institute of Art, formerly operating as David Roberts Art Foundation (DRAF), is a non-profit contemporary arts organisation based in London. It commissions pioneering performance art, collaborates with national partners on exhibitions and works to research and share the David and Indrė Roberts Collection.

British property developer and art collector David Roberts founded the organisation in 2007 and since then it has had over 135,000 visitors, partnered with over 100 museums and organisations and worked with over 1,000 artists.

== History ==
Founded in London, UK in 2007, the Roberts Institute of Art operated as the David Roberts Art Foundation (DRAF) until April 2021. Named after its founder David Roberts, DRAF was set up to share what was then known as the David Roberts Collection and is now called the David and Indrė Roberts Collection. Roberts is a commercial property developer who founded and became CEO of Edinburgh House Estates. He began collecting in the early 1990s and, after founding the organization, appointed curator Vincent Honoré to direct a programme of free public events.

DRAF originally ran an exhibition space on Great Titchfield Street, central London, presenting group and solo exhibitions and hosting talks and performances. The annual Evening of Performances (2008–ongoing), a showcase of work by artists, musicians and choreographers, began there. The Curators' Series (2009–2020) was also established to support curatorial research and practices. Over 11 years DRAF invited curators, duos and organisations, including Arcadia Missa (UK), Christine Eyene (Cameroon), and Mihnea Mircan (Romania) to create exhibitions.

In 2012 the organisation moved to a former 19th-century furniture factory in Camden, north London which had more space. Between 2015 and 2017 the Camden gallery also housed DRAF Studio, a space for in residence artists, choreographers, musicians, writers and peer organisations. In 2017, a tenth-anniversary edition of Evening of Performances took place at KOKO, London and included performances by Kris Lemsalu and Marvin Gaye Chetwynd. After DRAF's ten-year anniversary, the Camden space closed in late 2017 with the aim of sharing the organisation's programming more widely.

Between March 2018 - May 2019 Fatoş Üstek was Director and Chief Curator of DRAF, launching a UK-wide programme. In April 2021 the David Roberts Art Foundation become the Roberts Institute of Art.

== David and Indrė Roberts Collection ==
The Roberts Institute of Art manages the David and Indrė Roberts Collection, a body of more than 2,500 artworks by 850 artists. Works from the David and Indrė Roberts Collection have been shown publicly in shows, including at the Centre Pompidou (Paris), the Guggenheim Museum Bilbao, the Irish Museum of Modern Art (Dublin), the Museum of Contemporary Art Chicago, the National Portrait Gallery (London), the Scottish National Gallery of Modern Art (Edinburgh), the Solomon R. Guggenheim Museum (New York) and Tate Modern (London). The collection has been the subject of in-depth exhibitions at the Hepworth Wakefield (2013) and Mostyn, Wales (2018).

== Structure ==
The David Roberts Art Foundation Limited (trading as The Roberts Institute of Art) is a registered charity in England and Wales (No. 1119738) and a company limited by guarantee registered in England and Wales (No. 6051439) and is supported by Edinburgh House Estates Limited.
