= Toruk – The First Flight =

Cirque du Soleil play set in the world of James Cameron's film, Avatar.

- Logo for Cirque du Soleil's Toruk - The First Flight
- Company: Cirque du Soleil
- Genre: Contemporary circus
- Show type: Touring show
- Date of premiere: December 21, 2015 (Montreal)
- Final show: June 30, 2019 (London, GB)

Creative team
- Writers and directors: Michel Lemieux and Victor Pilon
- Creation director: Neilson Vignola
- Set designer: Carl Fillion
- Composer: Bob & Bill (Guy Dubuc and Marc Lessard)
- Costume designer: Kym Barrett
- Lighting designer: Alain Lortie
- Artistic guide: Guy Laliberté
- Sound designer: Jacques Boucher
- Makeup designer: Kym Barrett
- Rigging and acrobatic equipment designer: Pierre Masse
- Acrobatic performance designer: Germain Guillemot
- Choreographer: Tuan Le and Tan Loc Nguyen
- Puppet designer: Patrick Martel

Other information
- Preceded by: Joyà (2014)
- Succeeded by: Paramour (2016)
- Official website

Toruk – The First Flight is a Cirque du Soleil touring production that premiered in December 2015, and was inspired by James Cameron's film Avatar. It depicts a world before the events depicted in the film. The show began its development in Montreal, Quebec, and then moved in August 2015 to the CenturyLink Center in Bossier City, Louisiana, where rehearsals took place until the show premiered. The CenturyLink Center was chosen because the massive set of the show did not fit in the Cirque du Soleil studios in Montreal.

== Plot ==
The translation for the official teaser trailer from the constructed Na'vi language is the following: "I am the last living member of the Anurai clan. When I connect with Eywa, I hear the voices of our distant ancestors; I hear the time when their lives were threatened. This is that story."

Toruk is the central character of the show and is brought to life as a life-sized puppet, along with Pandoran animals such as the direhorse, the austrapede, the turtapede, and a viperwolf.

== Production ==
The Pandoran animals are brought to life through large-scale puppetry. Toruk itself is a 'reverse string puppet' (handled from the base) while the Austrapede, Turtapede and Direhorse are 'lived-in puppets' (someone is inside) and the Viperwolf is an 'in-view puppet' (the lower half of the puppeteer is outside, becoming a part of the puppet, while his/her upper body is inside the puppet).

The set of Toruk is made of inflated rubber and steel, making the huge set easier to transport from city to city.

== Reception ==
The Chicago Tribune praised the show's production values saying that "The designers of this piece — a group including Carl Fillion, Patrick Martel, Kym Barrett, Alain Lortie — combine with other superb artists to create the eye-popping landscape of the world of the 'Omatikaya,' ... all making stunning use of the still-new ability to project very high-quality graphics over any surface, however large. Not only does that include the entire floor of the United Center, but the audience as well. For some folks in your life, especially fans of Avatar or of high-graphics gaming, such design and tech wizardry will likely be more than enough." The review also said "Boring is not the word for this show — too much greets the eye. But your soul won't ache for humanity."

NZME wrote that "The play succeeds and fails in the same ways as the film did... While everything was ridiculously impressive to look at, the pacing felt off and the story simply wasn't intriguing enough to justify it."

The National wrote that "It is true Toruk is not full of the heart-stopping acrobatics that defined previous shows. But the thrill is replaced with heart; the environmentalist message coursing through the show is delivered by the soulful performances of the dancers whose facial expressions run the gamut from hope and joy to fear and ultimately resilience."

BroadwayWorld wrote "Overall I would recommend this show to people who would appreciate a story-telling art piece that's visually very appealing. But to the Cirque du Soleil-admirers who prefer some more action like a Ká/Zumanity/O vegas-show, they will be disappointed because the energy level is at an immensely low point."

Gulf News wrote that the show "is a visually ambitious piece of entertainment, with 40 projectors creating a world that feels alive — movements, sounds and scents included ... Overall, the show does not occupy itself with continuous acrobatic acts that will leave your heart lodged in your throat. Instead, it lends itself to onstage transformations, where the expansive world of Avatar is re-explored in the flesh."

== Acrobatic Acts ==
Toruk features 5 speciality acrobatic acts and general tumbling skills in order to capture the other worldly skills of the inhabitants of Pandora. Each tribe has their own unique apparatus and discipline, reflecting their tribal values and skills which Entu and Ralu will need to learn in order to tame Toruk. The following lists the acts, correct as of the first Asia Pacific Tour. Several acts were added following the premiere of Toruk, and hence are not included in the official DVD recording. Those featured at the premiere (and on the DVD are in italics):

- Tumbling: The young members of the Omaticaya Clan play a unique ball game in which points are scored by diving through giant hoop structures whilst carrying a glowing orb. All the meanwhile the clan members are jumping off and around the surroundings of the Hometree.
- Mother Loom/Spanish Webs: The Omaticaya Clan performers perform tricks on an angled grid frame in the centre of the hometree. On either side of the loom a performers climb and slide down Spanish Webs.
- Aerial Straps: Entu seeks refuge at the Tree of Voices, swinging on the straps, the tree's branches, to seek comfort from his deceased parents after falling during his initiation ceremony, breaking his ceremonial bow and failing the task.
- Aerial Silks: Tsyal climbs up the silk, the stem of the giant flower in the centre of the Tawakami tribe to reach the Tranquil Seed, one of the sacred objects to Entu and Ralu's quest.
- Contortion/Hand Balancing: Members of the Anurai Clan demonstrate their balancing skills by manoeuvring over a skeleton (resembling that of Toruk) which is fixed only by a pivot in the middle, tipping and turning all the while.
- Chinese Poles: The Tipani, specialists in weaponry, demonstrate their attacking skills on swinging Chinese poles, shaped like spears.
- Kites/Boomerang: Nearing their final goal of reaching Toruk, the trio reach the Kekunan Tribe, specialists in flying. Performers manipulate kites, shaped like the wings of the Toruk, whilst one Kekunan throws glowing, three sided boomerangs around the central platform before catching them again, much like horizontal juggling.

== Music ==
Toruk - The First Flight

Soundtrack album by Guy Dubuc, Marc Lessard
- Released: February 5, 2016
- Label: Cirque du Soleil Musique

1. "Omaticaya Clan"
2. "Lu Aw Navi"
3. "Shaman Story"
4. "Tawkami Clan"
5. "The Anurai Clan Sanctuary"
6. "Viperwolves and the Tipani Clan"
7. "Direhorses"
8. "Kekunan Clan"
9. "Hallelujah Mountains"
10. "The Toruk"
11. "Luminous Reunion"

The following tracks are included in the show but are not on the CD:

1. "Inside Hometree"
2. "Weaving Song"
3. "Earthquake!"
4. "The Vision"
5. "The Clearing"
6. "Tree of Voices"
7. "River & Desert"
8. "Lava & Flood"
9. "The First Toruk Makto"

=== Vocalists ===
- Priscilia le Foll - From 2015 to Present
