= Lewis Bush (photographer) =

British photographer

Lewis K. Bush (born 1988) is a British photographer, writer, curator and educator. He aims "to draw attention to forms of invisible power that operate in the world", believing that "power is always problematic" because it is inherently "arbitrary and untransparent".

Bush's The Memory of History (2012), is about Europe's forgetfulness of its unresolved past and that past's re-emergence, as evidenced in the time of the European debt crisis; The Camera Obscured (2012) is about the absurdity of security guards preventing people from photographing buildings; Metropole (2015) is "an architectural critique on the changing face of London"; War Primer 3 (2013) is a reworking of Broomberg and Chanarin's book War Primer 2; and Shadows of the State (2018) is about numbers stations. All are self-published apart from Shadows of the State and the 2018 version of Metropole. The Memory of History and Metropole have been shown in solo exhibitions in London.

== Life and work ==
Bush was born in 1988 in London. He studied history at the University of Warwick and gained a master's degree in documentary photography from London College of Communication (LCC). He lectures on photojournalism and documentary photography at LCC.

In 2012, for The Memory of History (2012), Bush travelled through ten European Union countries to examine the effects of the European debt crisis, in the context of Europe's turbulent history of crises that are forgotten, only later to resurface. Bush intends to show that process happening again, where unresolved history is reappearing "with the economic pain of the present", using photographs that show "connections between history and the present".

For The Camera Obscured (2012) he set up a camera obscura outside sensitive sites around London and used it to draw them until challenged by security guards. Bush "attempted to engage these personnel in a discussion about art history, highlighting the blurred boundaries between images made by mechanical means and those drawn by hand, and by doing so demonstrating the absurdity of their objections." The work is also about "the intersections of art and photography, and the question of where the balance lies between individual rights and collective security."

His War Primer 3 (2013 and 2015) is a reworking of Broomberg and Chanarin's War Primer 2 (2011), itself an appropriation of Bertolt Brecht's pacifist book War Primer (1955). Brecht's book was a "critique of the relationship between war and photography", using photographs and poems; Bush's ebook, in critiquing Broomberg and Chanarin's book, is about "inequality, labour and capital." The title recalls a primer, a first textbook for teaching of reading.

His Metropole (2015) zine and corresponding book (2018) is "an architectural critique on the changing face of London", "intended to highlight how large swathes of the city are being developed so quickly that they have become unrecognisable – a move he believes is aggressively wiping out London's history and diversity."

His Shadows of the State (2018) is a book about numbers stations, that "seeks to visualise, locate and expose many of these stations". It is about the "line of reasoning [. . . ] that the only way to defend democracy is by having something inherently undemocratic at its core." Rather than taking photographs, Bush collated write-ups, publicly available satellite imagery, spectrograms and maps.

His book Depravity's Rainbow (2023) is about early rocket development in Nazi Germany including the V-2 ballistic missile and the way that many engineers involved in these projects were recruited by Allied countries after the war and went on to play a major role in post-war rocket development including at NASA during the Apollo project. The book predominantly focuses on Wernher von Braun.

As well as books, Bush has published around twenty zines containing smaller projects. For example, during the UK's first COVID-19 pandemic lockdown, Bush forensically exposed and photographed fingerprints present on goods he bought in shops and online. The work is about the potential for contamination of consumers with SARS-CoV-2. It is also about exposing the presence of the usually hidden labourers, vulnerable because of working in distribution at a time of social distancing.

From 2011 to 2016 he wrote and edited a blog about photography, Disphotic. He also written about photography for other publications including The British Journal of Photography, The Art Newspaper, Frieze, and publications by Foam Fotografiemuseum Amsterdam and Fotomuseum Antwerp.

== Publications ==
=== Publications by Bush ===
- The Memory of History. Self-published, 2012. With essays by Bush. (Note: The author's page about The Memory of History can be seen here)
  - Boxed edition. Self-published, 2012. 56 prints and an essay, "The History of Memory", in 12 separate short chapters. Edition of 27 copies. (Note: The essay "The History of Memory" is available here as a PDF in the author's site)
  - Updated second edition. Self-published, 2014. Restructured and with updated text, and with a new introduction by Bush.
- The Camera Obscured. Self-published, 2012. With texts by Bush. (Note: The author's page about The Camera Obscured can be seen here)
- War Primer 3. (Note: The author's page about War Primer 3 can be seen here and can be downloaded as a PDF here)
  - Ebook. Self-published, 2013.
  - Facsimile edition. Self-published, 2018.
- Shadows of the State. Berlin: Brave, 2018. ISBN 978-3-947312-02-3. (Note: The author's page about Shadows of the State can be seen here)
- Metropole. Overlapse, 2018. ISBN 9780994791979.
- Depravity's Rainbow. Disphotic Editions, 2023. ISBN 978-1-7392695-0-0.

=== Smaller publications by Bush ===
- Metropole. Self-published, 2015. (Note: The author's page about Metropole can be seen here) A zine.
  - Second printing. Self-published, 2015.
- A Model Continent. Self-published, 2016. A postcard book. (Note: The author's page about A Model Continent can be seen here)
- Stryker. Self-published, 2019. A zine.
- Peckham Gothic. Self-published, 2019. A zine.
- Eleven Privatised Public Assets. Self-published, 2019. A zine.
- Latent Labour. Self-published, 2020. A zine.
- Spyhole. Self-published, 2020. A zine.
- Welcome to the Hotel Santa Maria. Self-published, 2020. A zine.
- Sunlight. Self-published, 2021. A zine.
- Regression Towards the Mean. Self-published, 2021. A zine.
- City of Dust. Self-published, 2021. A zine.
- Borderlands. Self-published, 2021. A zine.
- Best Copy Available. Self-published, 2021. A zine.
- Antique Land. Self-published, 2021. A zine.
- A Model Continent. Self-published, 2021. A zine.
- A Grey Area. Self-published, 2021. A zine.

=== Publication with contribution by Bush ===
- Flash Forward 2017: Emerging Photographers from Canada, the United Kingdom & the United States. Toronto: Magenta Foundation, 2017. ISBN 978-1-926856-11-7. With a foreword by Dan Gaba.

== Exhibitions ==
=== Solo exhibitions ===
- The Memory of History, 12 Star Gallery, Europe House, London, 2014.
- Metropole, London Arts Board, London, 2015.
- Metropole, Sir John Cass School of Art, Architecture and Design, London Metropolitan University, London, 2015–2016.
- City of Dust, Westminster Reference Library, London, 2016.
- Trading Zones, The Old Police Station, Saint Helier, Jersey, September 2018. Work resulting from the Archisle photographer in residence at the Société Jersiaise on the Channel Island of Jersey, exploring different aspects of offshore finance on the island.
- Counter-Power, Galerie Art & Essai – Université Rennes 2, Rennes, France, November - December 2023. Early career retrospective of three of Bush’s projects.
- An Infinitely Dark Legacy, Heinrich Heine University Düsseldorf, Düsseldorf, Germany, November - April 2025. Touring exhibition based on Bush's project Depravity's Rainbow.
- An Infinitely Dark Legacy, Akademie der Wissenschaften und der Literatur, Mainz, Germany, January 2026. Touring exhibition based on Bush's project Depravity's Rainbow.

=== Exhibitions curated by Bush ===
- Media & Myth, Format Festival, Derby, UK, 2015.
- Magna Errata, The Alternative Magna Carta Festival, Clerkenwell, London, 2015.
- Very Now, London College of Communication, London, 2016.
- Images of Power, Seen Fifteen Gallery, Peckham, London, 2016. Curated by Bush and Mark Duffy.
- Incomplete Images, Light Eye Mind, London, 2017. Curated by Bush and Monica Alcazar-Duarte. Work by Tomás Peña, Elena Kollatou and Leonidas Toumpanos, Aram Karim, Damon Amb, and Rahman Hassani.
- It's Gonna be Great, Copeland Gallery, Peckham, London, 2017. Curated by Bush and Duffy.

== Awards ==
- 2017: 1 of 92 winners, Magenta Foundation Flash Forward Award, Toronto, Canada
- 2018: International Photographer in Residence, Archisle Project, Société Jersiaise Photographic Archive, Jersey
- 2019: Photographer in Residence, Gobelins / BMW residency.
