= Greg Girard =

Canadian photographer (born 1955)

- Born: 1955 (age 70–71); Vancouver, British Columbia, Canada
- Occupation: photographer
- Known for: City of Darkness: Life in Kowloon Walled City; Phantom Shanghai; Hanoi Calling; Under Vancouver 1972–1982; Hotel Okinawa
- Website: www.greggirard.com

Greg Girard (born 1955) is a Canadian photographer whose work has examined the social and physical transformation in Asia's largest cities for more than three decades.

City of Darkness Revisited (2014) revives an early collaboration with co-author Ian Lambot, and updates their original book City of Darkness: Life in Kowloon Walled City (1993). Based in Shanghai between 1998 and 2011, Phantom Shanghai (2007) looks at the rapid and at times violent transition of Shanghai as the city raced to make itself "modern again" at the beginning of the 21st century. Under Vancouver 1972–1982 (2017) looks at the city where Girard was born, especially the waterfront and the other unglamorous parts of the port city, before making Asia his home for the next thirty years. While living in Hong Kong he photographed Hong Kong's neon-drenched streets, bars and nightclubs, in the book HK:PM Hong Kong 1974–1989 (2017). Hotel Okinawa (2017) looks at Okinawa's unique social and physical landscape, created by decades of living alongside the US military. Tokyo-Yokosuka 1976–1983 (2019) completes a loose trilogy of photobooks (along with Under Vancouver 1972–1982 and HK: PM Hong Kong Night Life 1974–1989) that features early work made in the 1970s and 1980s, largely before his professional career began in the late 1980s. JAL 76–88 expands on work that first appeared in Tokyo-Yokusuka 1976–1983. It documents artefacts of a pre-bubble Japan, and particularly Tokyo.

Girard's work is in the collection of the National Gallery of Canada, The Art Gallery of Ontario, the Vancouver Art Gallery. His photographs have appeared in Time, Newsweek, Fortune, Forbes, Elle, Paris Match, Stern, The New York Times Magazine. His work has been exhibited in galleries in South Korea, London, Germany, Helsinki, and New York City. In addition to book projects and gallery work he is a contributing photographer to National Geographic.

== Biography ==
Girard's first photographs were made in the city he grew up, Vancouver, British Columbia, Canada, in the early 1970s. Between 1972 and 1982, Girard had an early interest in the effects of artificial light on colour film at night, and subject matter dealing with the social and physical underside of the city. During this period he also made his first trips to Asia, to Hong Kong and South-East Asia, later living in Tokyo in the late 1970s. This early interest in Asia resulted in relocating to Hong Kong in 1982, where he lived until 1998. A move to Shanghai followed, where he lived for more than a decade, before returning in 2011 to Vancouver, where he lives today.

== Notable work ==
=== Under Vancouver 1972–1982 ===
Under Vancouver 1972–1982 is a collection of photographs of Girard's hometown, Vancouver (and published as a book of the same title), a series that began while he was still in high school. In this early work the city's origins as a west coast Canadian port at the end of the rail line are still much in evidence. Soon after this work was made, Vancouver began to be noticed by the wider world (after Expo 86), and the city began refashioning itself as an urban resort close to nature, also attracting attention as a destination for real estate investment. The photographs in Under Vancouver 1972–1982 reveal an early interest in the hidden and the overlooked, the use of color transparency film at night, and the extended photographic inquiry of a specific place, all of which became signature features of later books such as City of Darkness and City of Darkness Revisited (about the Kowloon Walled City), Phantom Shanghai and Hanoi Calling.

=== Kowloon Walled City ===
Photographed between 1986 and 1992, Girard's Kowloon Walled City photographs form the basis for the books City of Darkness: Life in Kowloon Walled City and City of Darkness Revisited, a record of the final years of the infamous Kowloon Walled City in Hong Kong: a largely self-governing enclave of more than 35,000 people living in 300 interconnected high-rise buildings, constructed without architectural, engineering or health and safety oversight. While it stood (until 1992) Kowloon Walled City was the most densely populated place on Earth. Girard's photographs, along with co-author Ian Lambot's, provide the most thorough record of what life was like for Walled City residents, and have served as a visual reference for film production designers (e.g. Batman Begins directed by Christopher Nolan), writers (e.g. The Bridge Trilogy by William Gibson), video game designers (e.g. Call of Duty: Black Ops) and others in creating an imagined dystopian urban environment.

=== Phantom Shanghai ===
Photographed between 2000 and 2006, Phantom Shanghai defines a key historic moment as China's largest city was racing to make up for "lost time" (following China's isolation after Mao Zedong’s victory in 1949 and the tumult of the Cultural Revolution, 1966–1976). The destruction of architecturally and historically significant buildings and neighborhoods is a significant feature of this series by Girard. Phantom Shanghai is featured in Martin Parr and WasinkLundgren’s The Chinese Photobook.

=== Hanoi Calling ===
Photographed by Girard in 2009 and 2010, Hanoi Calling was published in 2010 to commemorate the millennium anniversary of the founding of the Vietnamese capital. Looking at the often ignored and overlooked features of the everyday city, Hanoi Calling is a record of the public and private spaces that form the foreground and background to daily life as the millennium anniversary approached.

=== In the Near Distance ===
In the Near Distance, published in 2010, looks at Girard's early work between 1972 and 1986, in his home town Vancouver and on travels to the US, Japan, and other parts of Asia. The early use of colour transparency film and long exposures at night, which became a signature feature of his later work, especially in Phantom Shanghai, are first in evidence here.

=== Hotel Okinawa ===
Japan's southernmost prefecture, Okinawa, hosts a concentration of US military bases unlike anywhere outside the continental United States. More than half the 50,000 US troops stationed in Japan are based here. On the main island of Okinawa nearly 20% of the land is occupied by these bases. This large US military footprint, and the legacy of Okinawa's history as a US-administered territory until 1972, means that the social and physical landscape of Okinawa is shaped by this relationship with the US military like few other places. In Hotel Okinawa (2017), Girard looks at this unique world "on base" and off, separate and yet conjoined, the result of decades of living in close proximity with the US military. Additionally, archival photographs, periodicals and other artefacts, some dating back to the US occupation, appear throughout the book, registering historical strands that are part of the complex fabric of Okinawa today.

== Selected exhibitions ==
=== Solo ===
- Phantom Shanghai, Monte Clark Gallery, Vancouver/Toronto, Canada, 2008. With a foreword by William Gibson.
- Half the Surface of the World, Monte Clark Gallery, Vancouver/Toronto, Canada, 2010
- Hanoi Calling, Monte Clark Gallery, Vancouver/Toronto, Canada, 2011
- A Better Tomorrow, Monte Clark Gallery, Vancouver, Canada, 2013
- Selects, Monte Clark Gallery, Vancouver, Canada, 2015
- Under Vancouver 1972–1982, Monte Clark Gallery, Vancouver, Canada, April 22 – May 27, 2017

=== Group ===
- Cities on the Move, Hayward Gallery, London, 1999
- Cities of the 21st Century, Bauhaus Dessau, Germany, 2000
- Unfinished Business, Presentation House Gallery, North Vancouver, Canada, 2004
- Shanghai Kaleidoscope, Royal Ontario Museum, Toronto, Canada, 2008
- People Meet in Architecture, Hong Kong Pavilion, Venice Biennale of Architecture, Italy, 2010
- Towards a Social Landscape, Lianzhou Photography Festival, China, 2011
- The Near and the Elsewhere, PM House, London, 2012
- Perspectives, International Center of Photography, New York City, 2012
- One Percent: Privilege in Time of Global Inequality, Pingyao Photography Festival, Pingyao, China, 2015
- Pictures From Here, Vancouver Art Gallery, Vancouver, Canada; May 18 – September 4, 2017

== Books ==
=== Books by Girard ===
- Phantom Shanghai. Toronto: Magenta, 2007. ISBN 978-0973973914.
- In the Near Distance. Berlin: Kominek, 2010.
- Hanoi Calling. Toronto: Magenta, 2010. ISBN 978-1926856018.
- Hotel Okinawa. The Velvet Cell, 2017. ISBN 978-1-908889-41-6. Edition of 500 copies.
- Under Vancouver 1972–1982. Toronto: Magenta, 2017. ISBN 978-1-926856-10-0.
- HK:PM Hong Kong Night Life 1974–1989. Asia One Books, 2017. ISBN 978-9887712176.
- Tokyo-Yokosuka 1976–1983. Magenta, 2019. ISBN 978-1926856148.
- JAL 76 – 88. Kominek Books, 2022. ISBN 978-3-9824542-3-8

=== Books paired with others ===
- City of Darkness. With Ian Lambot. London: Watermark, 1993.
- City of Darkness Revisited. With Ian Lambot. London: Watermark, 2014. ISBN 978-1873200889.

== Collections ==
- Art Bank of the Canada Council
- Art Gallery of Ontario
- National Gallery of Canada
- Vancouver Art Gallery
- M+

== Film ==
- Snapshot, video documentary featuring Girard. 24-minute program in a series of 8 by the Bravo (Canada) network, featuring the working lives of photographers.
