= MV Princess Miral =

Turkish cargo ship

History

Belize
- Name: Sun Bright (1990); Bright Pescadores (1997); ID Leader (1999); Lin Yang (2003); Princess Miral
- Owner: (Turkey) 7 Ocean Shipping
- Port of registry: Belize
- Launched: 11 June 1990
- Identification: IMO number: 9016727

General characteristics
- Class & type: General cargo ship
- Tonnage: 8,975 DWT; 5,552 GT
- Length: 98 m (321 ft 6 in)
- Beam: 19 m (62 ft 4 in)

MV Princess Miral was a Belizian-flagged, Turkish-owned cargo ship which ran aground and sank off the coast of India in June 2022.

== Description ==
Princess Miral was a general cargo ship with a summer deadweight of 8,975 DWT and a gross tonnage of 5,552 GT. It was 98 metres (322 ft) long and 19 metres (62 ft) wide.

== History ==
The ship was built in 1990 as Sun Bright, and was renamed several times over the course of its career to Bright Pescadores, ID Leader, Lin Yang, and finally Princess Miral.

=== Sinking ===
On 20 June 2022, Princess Miral was transiting off the coast of Ullal, India, while carrying a cargo of steel coils from Malaysia to Lebanon. During severe weather, the ship sustained a serious hull breach towards its front and was taking on water, and it was grounded in order to prevent sinking. The next day, its 15 Syrian crewmembers were successfully evacuated from the ship by Indian Coast Guard search-and-rescue teams on the ships Vikram and Amartya. The crew were transported to a foreigners' detention facility in Nelamangala, to be eventually repatriated to their own country.

By 22 June, the ship was still grounded, and its owner was attempting to organize a rescue operation to save it. Additionally, salvage teams arrived from Mumbai to assess the possibility of salvaging the cargo of steel coils. However, the ship sunk completely on 23 June before any rescue could be organized. Instead, a Singapore-based agency began to investigate ways to extract the remaining 220 tonnes of fuel from the ship in order to prevent a spill.

As part of the efforts to contain pollution, India dispatched two aircraft and eight ships to the site of the shipwreck, including the pollution control vessel Samudra Pavak. By 24 June, only minor oil leakage was detected from the engine and water tanks. On 25 June, Samudra Pavak arrived at the shipwreck and containment booms were placed at the mouth of a nearby river to prevent contamination.

=== Crew Abandonment ===
On 4 June, the crew declared themselves officially abandoned, after receiving no wages for a period of at least two months. According to the UN International Labor Organisation, the Ship Operator attempted to make the crew sign fake wage receipts to demonstrate that they had been paid, threatening to withhold their repatriation until they had done so.
