= Alejandro del Mazo =

Mexican politician

- Born: 4 August 1980 (age 45); State of Mexico, Mexico
- Occupation: Politician
- Political party: PVEM
- Family: Alfredo del Mazo González (father); Alfredo del Mazo Maza (brother)

Alejandro del Mazo Maza (born 4 August 1980) is a Mexican politician from the Ecologist Green Party of Mexico. From 2010 to 2012 he served as Deputy of the LXI Legislature of the Mexican Congress representing the State of Mexico.
