= Sid Lee =

Canadian marketing firm

- Type: Private
- Industry: Creative services
- Founded: 1993
- Headquarters: Montreal, Quebec, Canada
- Key people: Jean-François Bouchard, Philippe Meunier, Bertrand Cesvet, Martin Gauthier
- Products: Marketing, architecture, product development, industrial design
- Number of employees: 900
- Website: sidlee.com/fr

Sid Lee is an international creative services firm founded in Montreal, Quebec, Canada. It operates offices in Toronto, New York City, Los Angeles, Seattle, and Paris. The agency offers services in the fields of branding, digital and social marketing, advertising, analytics, architecture and retail design, branded content, and entertainment.

== From Diesel to Sid Lee ==
In 1993, Philippe Meunier and Jean-François Bouchard founded the advertising agency Diesel in Montreal.

Diesel quickly made a name for itself with innovative campaigns: a radio-only campaign for Sleeman Breweries and the creation of a fleet of graffiti-covered car wrecks for Pizzédélic pizza chain.

With the rise of the Internet in the mid-‘90s, Diesel quickly went digital. The agency was one of the first in Quebec to build a commercial website.

After having been one of Diesel’s clients, Bertrand Cesvet joined the company in 1997. With the turn of the century approaching and a digital revolution about to transform the industry, Diesel merged with Stratège Media in 1999 and added Martin Gauthier and Daniel Fortier to their management team.

This is also when Diesel began to develop a business relationship with Cirque du Soleil, an organization that would go on to establish itself as an innovative creator in its industry.

In 2007, Diesel changed its name to Sid Lee to avoid being confused with the clothing brand. Sid Lee is actually an anagram of Diesel.

== Diversification ==
In 2008, Sid Lee landed the global Adidas Originals account. In the midst of this partnership, the agency opened offices among the hustle and bustle of Amsterdam in 2008 and Paris in 2009, in what Bertrand Cesvet described as “a semi-controlled whirlwind of boundless enthusiasm.”

In 2009, Sid Lee realized that the future of retail depended on a brand’s ability to attract customers to its stores and the way it interacts with its consumers. This thought led to the founding of Sid Lee Architecture. Jean Pelland and Martin Leblanc founded this new branch within the agency.

The Toronto office also opened in 2010, an endeavour led by Vito Piazza.

Sid Lee added an office in New York in 2012 and another in Los Angeles in 2014.

In 2012, C2 Montréal hosted its first edition, a unique event imagined by Sid Lee and Le Cirque du Soleil.

During the 2013 Cannes Lions Festival, the firm announced the launch of Sid Lee Entertainment, aimed at creating engaging experiences and content for its clients.

The firm designed the Toronto Raptors’ We The North marketing campaign in 2014.

On July 6, 2015, Sid Lee was acquired by kyu, the strategic operating unit of the Japanese Hakuhodo DY Holdings, which is currently headed by CEO Michael Birkin.

In October 20, 2017, Sid Lee Paris bought YARD, a French creative and production agency.

In 2019, Sid Lee continued its expansion into the United States as Hornall Anderson, Infrared and Red Peak joined the agency. Digital Kitchen also became a member of its community of talents. In the wake of these developments, the agency strengthened its US presence with an office in Seattle.
