= Turner House Gallery =

Art gallery in Penarth, Wales

Coordinates: 51.4358°N 3.1737°W

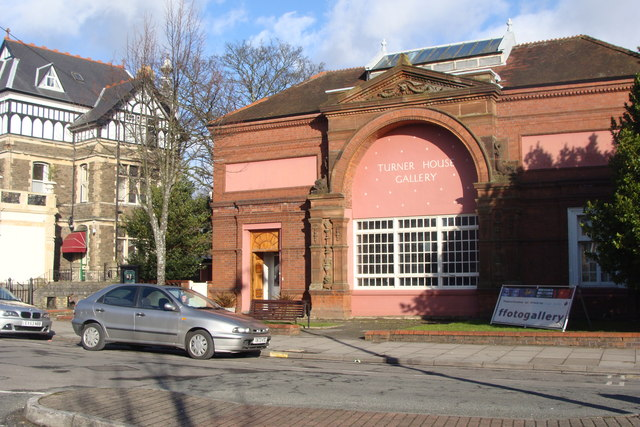
Turner House Gallery (2009)

Turner House Gallery is an art gallery and multi-purpose cultural venue in Penarth, near Cardiff, Wales.

== Details ==
The gallery was built in 1887/8, designed by architect Edwin Seward in a Queen Anne style for the rich local flour merchant, James Pyke Thompson. Pyke Thompson used the gallery to exhibit his collection of artworks, which include drawings, etchings, and ceramics, by artists including Rembrandt, with free entry to the public. Pyke Thompson named the gallery after J. M. W. Turner, an artist whom he greatly admired.

Turner House Gallery was acquired by the National Museum of Wales in 1921 and used to display the museum's secondary public art collection.

The building was given Grade II listed status in 1993.

In 2003 Turner House was taken over by the registered charity, Ffotogallery, and subsequently was used for photography-based exhibitions. In 2014/15 the gallery became part of a wider Artes Mundi exhibition, staging works by Icelandic artist Ragnar Kjartansson and Croatian artist Sanja Iveković for Artes Mundi 6.

In 2018 Ffotogallery announced that it would be leaving Turner House for new premises in the centre of Cardiff, starting in July 2019. The town council were looking at creating a new cultural venue in the building.

In July 2018 Penarth Town Council launched an online community consultation survey regarding the future use of Turner House and other buildings. In 2021 the gallery reopened with Penarth Town Council working in partnership with Amgueddfa Cymru–National Museum Wales to use the building as multi-purpose cultural venue.

The gallery regularly hosts Hayward Gallery touring exhibition shows.

== Exhibitions ==
A selection of exhibitions held at the gallery include:

- Sue Hunt. 1996.
- Paul Seawright (Ffotogallery). 2003.
- Eduardo Paolozzi: General Dynamic F.U.N. 20 January - 13th Feb 2022.
- Self Help Show: Penarth illustrator Chris Glynn and poet Luca Paci. 10 February – 5 March 2023.
- Claude Cahun: Beneath this Mask. 9 March – 23 April 2023.
