= Teraoka =

Teraoka is a Japanese surname meaning "temple on a hill". Notable people with the surname include:

- Adam Teraoka (born 1967), American artist
- Carlos B. Teraoka (born 1930), Filipino-Japanese businessman and chairman of the Filipino-Japanese Foundation of Northern Luzon
- Jason Teraoka (born 1964), American artist
- Masami Teraoka (born 1936), Japanese-American contemporary artist
