= Mar de Cortés International Airport =

International airport in Puerto Peñasco, Sonora, Mexico

Puerto Peñasco International Airport Aeropuerto Internacional de Puerto Peñasco
- IATA: PPE; ICAO: MMPE

Summary
- Airport type: Public
- Owner/Operator: Grupo Vidanta
- Serves: Puerto Peñasco, Sonora, Mexico
- Built: 2009
- Time zone: MST (UTC−07:00)
- Elevation AMSL: 27 m (89 ft)
- Coordinates: 31°21′7.2″N 113°18′20.2″W
- Website: www.aeropuertomardecortes.com

Map
- Location of airport in Sonora PPE (Mexico)

Runways
| Direction | Length | | Surface |
| Direction | m | ft | Surface |
|---|---|---|---|
| 18/36 | 2,560 | 8,399 | Concrete |

Statistics (2025)
- Total passengers: 4,398
- Source: Agencia Federal de Aviación Civil

Puerto Peñasco International Airport (Spanish: Aeropuerto Internacional de Puerto Peñasco); officially Aeropuerto Internacional Mar de Cortés (Mar de Cortés International Airport) (IATA: PPE, ICAO: MMPE) is an international airport located in Puerto Peñasco, Sonora, Mexico. It serves domestic flights and general aviation activities in Puerto Peñasco. The airport is owned by Grupo Vidanta. It derives its name from Mar de Cortés (Sea of Cortés), a common term in Spanish for the Gulf of California.

Puerto Peñasco Airport stands as the first fully privately funded airport in Mexico. In 2025, it recorded 4,398 passengers, as reported by the Agencia Federal de Aviación Civil (Mexican Federal Aviation Administration).

== History ==
The initial airfield in Puerto Peñasco commenced operations in the 1940s, primarily serving as a stopover on Mexicana de Aviación's route from Mexico City to Mexicali and featuring a telegraph office. In 1973, a larger airfield with a small terminal was established, achieving official international airport status in 1994. Before this designation, pilots had to navigate immigration and customs processes in Nogales or Mexicali.

In 2005, Grupo Vidanta carried out significant enhancements at the older airfield, investing in runway and ramp repaving, terminal expansion, parking facilities, perimeter fencing, and improved signage. Simultaneously, a more expansive commercial airport was developed 10 miles east of the existing airfield. The current airport was inaugurated on November 5, 2009, and officially opened to the public on October 31, 2009, serving as a Mexican Airport of Entry (M-AOE). Consequently, the original airfield ceased operations.

Over the years, the airport has experienced intermittent service by regional airlines, offering seasonal flights within the region. Aeroméxico served the route Hermosillo-Puerto Peñasco-Las Vegas from 2013 to 2014. TAR Aerolíneas provided domestic flights in 2016. Aéreo Servicio Guerrero also offered services to Hermosillo, and Calafia Airlines to Tijuana, La Paz, and Loreto.

== Facilities ==
The airport is situated in La Jolla de Cortés, a 15-minute drive from Puerto Peñasco city center. It is located 5 minutes from major hotel and condominium developments along the Sea of Cortés. Covering an area of 500 hectares (1,200 acres) at an elevation of 27 metres (89 ft) above mean sea level, the airport features a single concrete runway, designated as 18/36. This runway spans 2,560 metres (8,400 ft) in length and is 60 metres (200 ft) wide, marking it as the fourth runway in Mexico entirely constructed with concrete provided by Cemex. The airport received the prize Premio Obras Cemex in 2007. The commercial aviation apron offers three parking positions for narrow-body aircraft and additional stands for general aviation.

The passenger terminal, a single-story structure, serves both domestic arrivals and departures. It comprises a check-in area, a security checkpoint, and an arrivals hall equipped with baggage claim facilities, car rental services, and taxi stands. The departures concourse houses two gates with direct access to the apron, allowing passengers to board planes by walking directly to the aircraft. Adjacent facilities include parking areas, civil aviation hangars, administration offices, courier and logistics facilities, as well as facilities for general aviation.

== Statistics ==
=== Annual Traffic ===
Passenger statistics at Puerto Peñasco Airport
| Year | Operatios | Passengers | Cargo Kg | Year | Operatios | Passengers | Cargo Kg |
| 2006 | | | | 2016 | 2,524 | 3,812 | 0 |
| 2007 | 154 | 2,431 | 1,474 | 2017 | 2,507 | 2,026 | 0 |
| 2008 | 327 | 4,115 | 2,192 | 2018 | 2,697 | 1,932 | 0 |
| 2009 | 5 | 292 | 0 | 2019 | 2,693 | 1,811 | 0 |
| 2010 | 49 | 3,649 | 0 | 2020 | 1,775 | 1,350 | 0 |
| 2011 | 19 | 1,729 | 0 | 2021 | 2,264 | 1,886 | 0 |
| 2012 | 0 | 0 | 0 | 2022 | 2,095 | 5,099 | 0 |
| 2013 | 223 | 5,632 | 500 | 2023 | 2,217 | 3,930 | 0 |
| 2014 | 302 | 605 | 54 | 2024 | 2,170 | 3,508 | 0 |
| 2015 | 2,196 | 1,438 | 0 | 2025 | 2,023 | 4,398 | 0 |

== See also ==
- List of the busiest airports in Mexico
- List of airports in Mexico
- List of airports by ICAO code: M
- List of busiest airports in North America
- List of the busiest airports in Latin America
- Transportation in Mexico
- Tourism in Mexico
- List of beaches in Mexico
- Gulf of California
- Grupo Vidanta
