= Daniel Lamarre =

Canadian businessman (born 1953)

Daniel Lamarre OC
- Born: 1953 (age 72–73); Grand-Mère, Quebec, Canada
- Education: University of Ottawa
- Occupation: Executive Vice-Chairman of the Board of Cirque du Soleil

Daniel Lamarre OC (born 1953) is a Canadian former journalist and former president and chief executive officer of the Canadian entertainment company Cirque du Soleil.

Born in Grand-Mère, Quebec, he graduated from the University of Ottawa with a Bachelor of Arts in communications in 1976. He has been honored with Doctorates from McGill University, and his alma mater the University of Ottawa.

Lamarre began his career as a journalist, then moved on to become the communications director for the Fédération des Caisses Populaires du Centre du Québec. In 1977 he became public relations director for the Canadian media company Cogeco. He worked with the public relations firms Burson-Marsteller (from 1981) and National Public Relations (1984-1997) in various leadership roles including president, and then served as president and CEO of TVA television network, Quebec’s largest private television broadcaster, from 1997 to 2000. He joined Cirque du Soleil in January 2001 at the request of company founder Guy Laliberté, whom he had previously encountered while working with National Public Relations. At Cirque du Soleil, Lamarre's responsibilities include developing strategies related to business development, operations, sales, the company's financial sustainability, and the perpetuation of its "culture and values".

In 2012 he co-created of C2MTL Conference, a networking conference between creative and business communities.

Daniel Lamarre supports several charities, notably the One Drop Foundation, with its mission to fight poverty by providing access to safe water, as well as Cirque du Monde, a worldwide social circus program targeting at-risk youth. He is also a member of the Board of Directors for the Montreal Heart Institute Foundation since 1994.

== Awards ==
In 2019, Lamarre, on behalf of Cirque du Soleil, received the Distinguished Leadership Award for Corporate Citizenship from the Inter-American Dialogue in recognition of the organization's work with at risk youth in Latin America using an innovative methodology structured around the arts, as well as their support of the One Drop Foundation in their effort to grant access to safe water to some of the region's most vulnerable communities.
