= VidantaWorld Elegant =

Luxury cruise ship operated by VidantaWorld

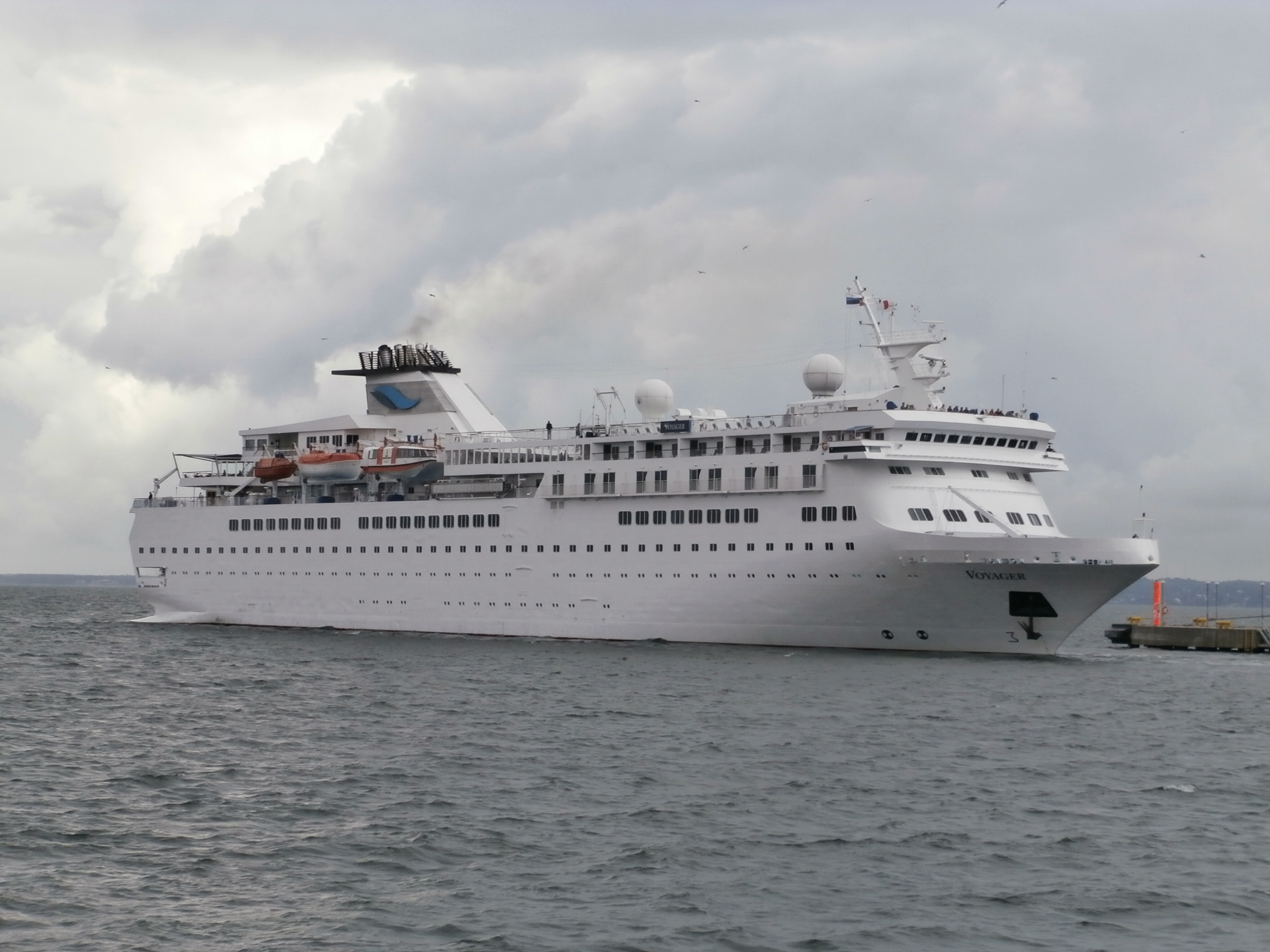
Voyager in 2013

VidantaWorld's Elegant is a boutique cruise ship operated by VidantaWorld. Launched in 1990, the vessel underwent a seven-year reconstruction between 2017 and 2024 before entering service for VidantaWorld in 2026.

The ship is noted for its reduced passenger density and large space-to-guest ratio compared to conventional cruise vessels.

At launch, the vessel was announced as the inaugural ship of Vidanta Cruises, Mexico's first luxury cruise line.

== History ==
The vessel was constructed at the Unión Naval de Levante shipyard in Valencia, Spain, and launched in 1990 as Crown Monarch for Crown Cruise Line. It later operated as the Nautican then the Walrus as a casino ship in Hong Kong. By 2007 it was operating in Europe as the Jules Verne.

Between 2012 and 2017, the vessel operated as Voyager for Voyages of Discovery, specialising in destination-focused boutique cruising.

Following the bankruptcy of All Leisure Group in 2017, the vessel was acquired by Grupo Vidanta.

A comprehensive reconstruction programme was subsequently commissioned by VidantaWorld. The project involved stripping the ship to its steel structure and redesigning significant portions of the vessel’s superstructure and interior spaces.

The reconstruction adopted a reduced-capacity strategy, decreasing the number of cabins from more than 270 to 108 and lowering maximum passenger capacity from approximately 550 guests to 216.

The redevelopment involved several international firms across structural engineering, interior architecture, and spatial design.

Structural transformation and construction work was carried out by Cantieri del Mediterraneo of Naples, Savi of Genoa, and De Wave Group.

Interior architecture and shared guest spaces were designed by SMC Design of London and Rockwell Group of New York.

Spatial experience design was led by Tillberg Design of Sweden.

== Design and specifications ==
The vessel features a deep-V displacement hull designed for ocean-going stability.

Technical specifications
Tonnage	15,396 GT
Length	152.6 m (500.6 ft)
Beam	22.52 m (73.9 ft)
Draft	5.4 m (17.7 ft)
Propulsion	4 × Wärtsilä 6R32 diesel engines
Power output	13.2 MW
Speed	18 knots (service), 21 knots (maximum)
MMSI	311001550
Call sign	3EGA8

=== Interior architecture ===
All 108 guest accommodations aboard the vessel are exterior-facing.

The ship’s largest accommodation, the Imperial Suite, measures approximately 1,431 sq ft and includes a private wine cellar and dining room.

== Operations ==
The ship began its inaugural Mediterranean season in April 2026, sailing from Funchal, Madeira. Its itineraries are characterized by slow travel principles, featuring overnight stays in boutique ports, such as Portofino, Saint-Tropez and the Greek Islands, which are inaccessible to larger cruise liners.
