= Joyà =

Resident show in Mexico

- Logo for Cirque du Soleil's Joyà
- Company: Cirque du Soleil
- Genre: Contemporary circus
- Show type: Resident show
- Date of premiere: November 8, 2014

Creative team
- Director of creation: Richard Dagenais
- Director: Martin Genest
- Set and props designer: Guillaume Lord
- Dramaturg: André Morency
- Costume designer: James Lavoie
- Composers: Guy Dubuc; Marc Lessard
- Sound designer: Jacques Boucher
- Lighting designer: Jean Laurin
- Choreographer: Harold Rhéaume
- Acrobatic choreographer: Philippe Aubertin
- Acrobatic and rigging designer: Pierre Masse
- Makeup designer: Nathalie Gagné

Other information
- Preceded by: Kurios (2014)
- Succeeded by: Toruk (2015)
- Official website

Joyà is an 80-minute long resident show at the Vidanta resort in the Riviera Maya, Mexico, produced as a collaboration between Cirque du Soleil and its subsidiary Cirque du Soleil Events + Experiences (formerly 45 Degrees). It is Cirque du Soleil's first resident show in Latin America.

== Culture meets nature ==
Joyà premiered on November 8, 2014, inside a custom-built theatre set in the jungle, with a 600 guests capacity. The exterior design of the theatre was inspired by organic forms in a clearing surrounded by trees. Before excavation and construction of the theatre could begin, biologists meticulously identified all flora and fauna specimens inhabiting the site, so that they could be relocated in similar surroundings prior to the groundbreaking ceremony. This important aspect of the project inspired the creators of Joyà to develop a story centered around a character who devotes his life to the study and protection of Yucatán's natural and historic environment.

== Story ==
The story, set in a naturalist's library that transforms into other exotic locations, follows the journey of a "rebellious teenage girl [who] is sent by her mischievous grandfather on a fantastical quest spanning generations". Throughout her adventures, the energetic and joyful Joyà encounters a series of colorful characters inspired by natural and cultural phenomena that have shaped Mexico and Mexican culture throughout History. In so doing, she experiences a vibrant and colorful coming of age which prepares her to take over her grandfather's commitment to Mexico's natural and cultural wonders. The creators of the show have cited the annual migration of monarch butterflies between Mexico and Canada as an important source of inspiration for the overall theme of the show; every year, the monarch's migration, essential to the survival of the species, can only be accomplished through the combined efforts of successive generations of butterflies.

== Culinary experience ==
The cultural experience offered by Cirque du Soleil and Vidanta consists in a hybrid form of entertainment wherein the show is presented in a venue where spectators are seated in a semi-circular dining hall facing an immersive setting where the story of Joyà unfolds around the public and over their heads. While enjoying the acrobatic performances, patrons can thus enjoy a refined dining experience designed to echo the creativity of the circus acts and the refinement of Mexican culture.

== Music ==
The soundtrack to Joya was released in the show boutique on 24 December 2015 before being released online on 15 January 2016. The tracks are as follows:

1. Naturalium (Opening/Hoop Diving)
2. Comedy Of Errors (Icarian games)
3. Reinas En La Penumbra (Solo trapeze)
4. Adventure At Sea (Pirates' arrival/Cube Manipulation)
5. The Dive (Puppetry)
6. Profunda Belleza (Hand balancing)
7. Legacy (Aerial straps)
8. Nueva Era (Trampoline wall/Finale)
