= Michal Iwanowski =

Polish photographer (born 1977)

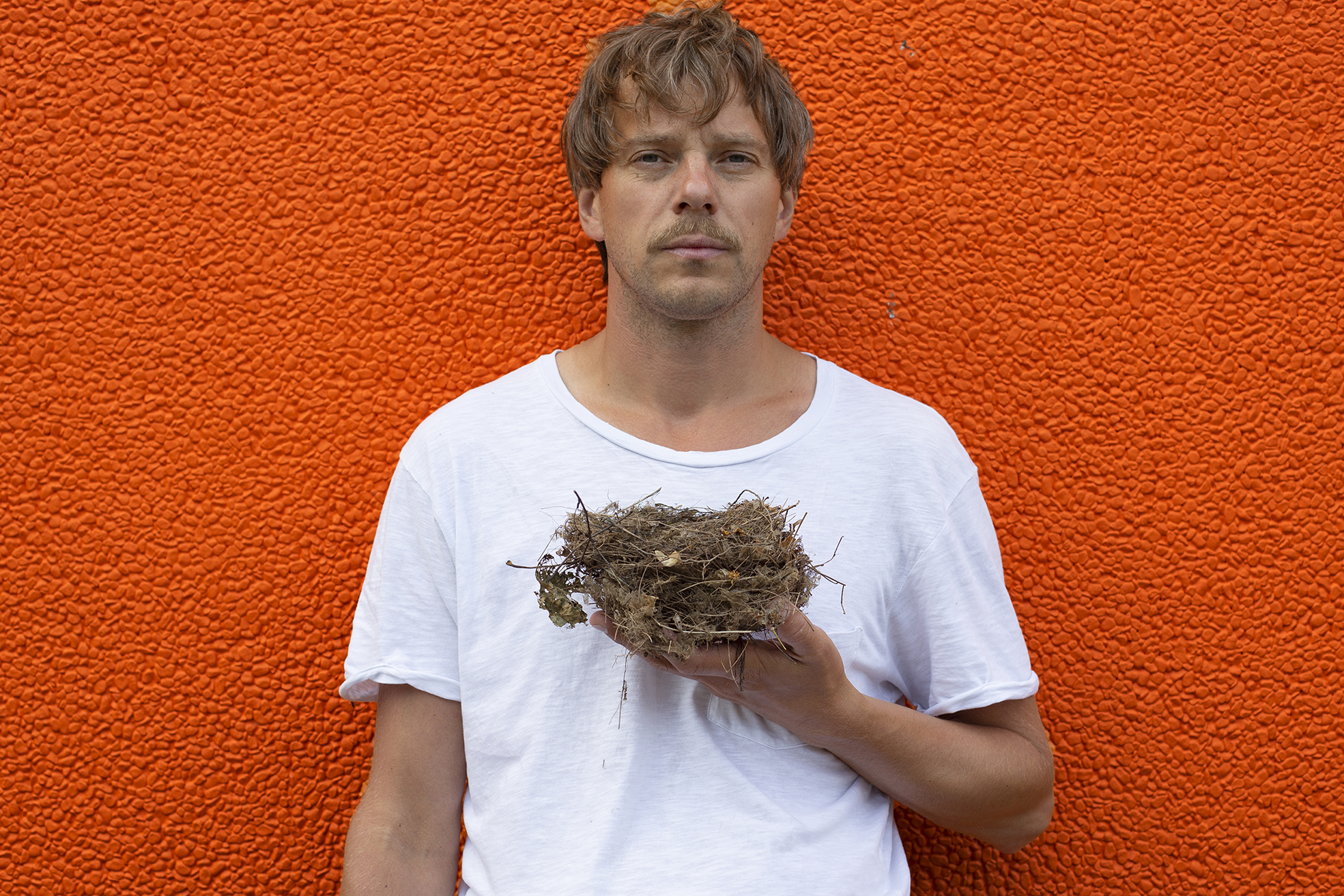
- Born: 20 January 1977 (age 49); Świebodzice
- Known for: Photography
- Website: michaliwanowski.com

Michal Iwanowski (born 1977) is a Polish photographer and writer currently living in Cardiff, Wales.

== Life and work ==
Iwanowski studied a MFA in Documentary Photography, University of Wales, Newport 2008.

=== Go home Polish ===
In April 2018, Iwanowski travelled on foot 1,900 km (1,200 mi) from Wales to Poland triggered by the message "Go home Polish" written on a wall in the Welsh capital that he saw in 2008. The journey took 105 days to complete as Iwanowski travelled through England, France, Belgium, the Netherlands, Germany and the Czech Republic asking people he met about the concept of home. Iwanowski says “The only way for me to find out where home was for me was to walk from my home in Cardiff where I have lived for 17 years, to the home of my birth in Poland, and to ask people along the way: ‘Where is it? Where is home? What does it mean if I tell you to go home?’”

=== Clear of People ===
In 2013 Iwanowski walked 2,200 km (1,400 mi) to trace his grandfather's escape from a Russian gulag. In 1945 Anatol and Wiktor Iwanowski escaped from a prisoner war camp in Kaluga, Russia, and walked over 2,200 km (1,400 mi) to make it back to Poland. As fugitives, they walked only when it was dark and lived on what they could find along the journey. When they reached Wroclaw 90 days later, they were reunited with their families. Iwanowski used a rough map found in his great uncle's diary, and went back to document the route through Russia, Belarus, Lithuania and Poland. His work was compiled in a new book, "Clear of People".

== Publications ==
- Clear of People. Berlin. Brave Books. 2017. ISBN 978-3-00-053351-8. Edition of 700 copies.

== Collections ==
- 2017: National Library of Wales, Aberystwyth
- 2018: Museum Of Contemporary Art, Zagreb, Croatia
- 2020: National Museum of Wales, Cardiff, Wales
- 2020: Col·lecció d’Art Banc Sabadell, Spain

== Selected Awards ==
- 2008: Finalist in British Journal of Photography Project Assistance Award
- 2009: Winner of Emerging Photographers 2009 by Magenta Foundation
- 2009: Honourable Mention at Px3 Prix De Photographie, Paris.
- 2016: Top 10 Books of 2016 for 'Post-war stories' at The New York Art Book Fair.
- 2017: Shortlisted for Die Schonsten Deutschen Bocher - The Best German Book Design 2017 for 'Clear of People.'
- 2018: Longlisted for Deutsche Borse Photography Prize 2018 for the book 'Clear of People.
- 2020: Longlisted for Deutsche Borse Photography Prize 2020 for 'Go Home Polish' exhibition at Peckham24, London.
