= Nuevo Nayarit =

- Municipality
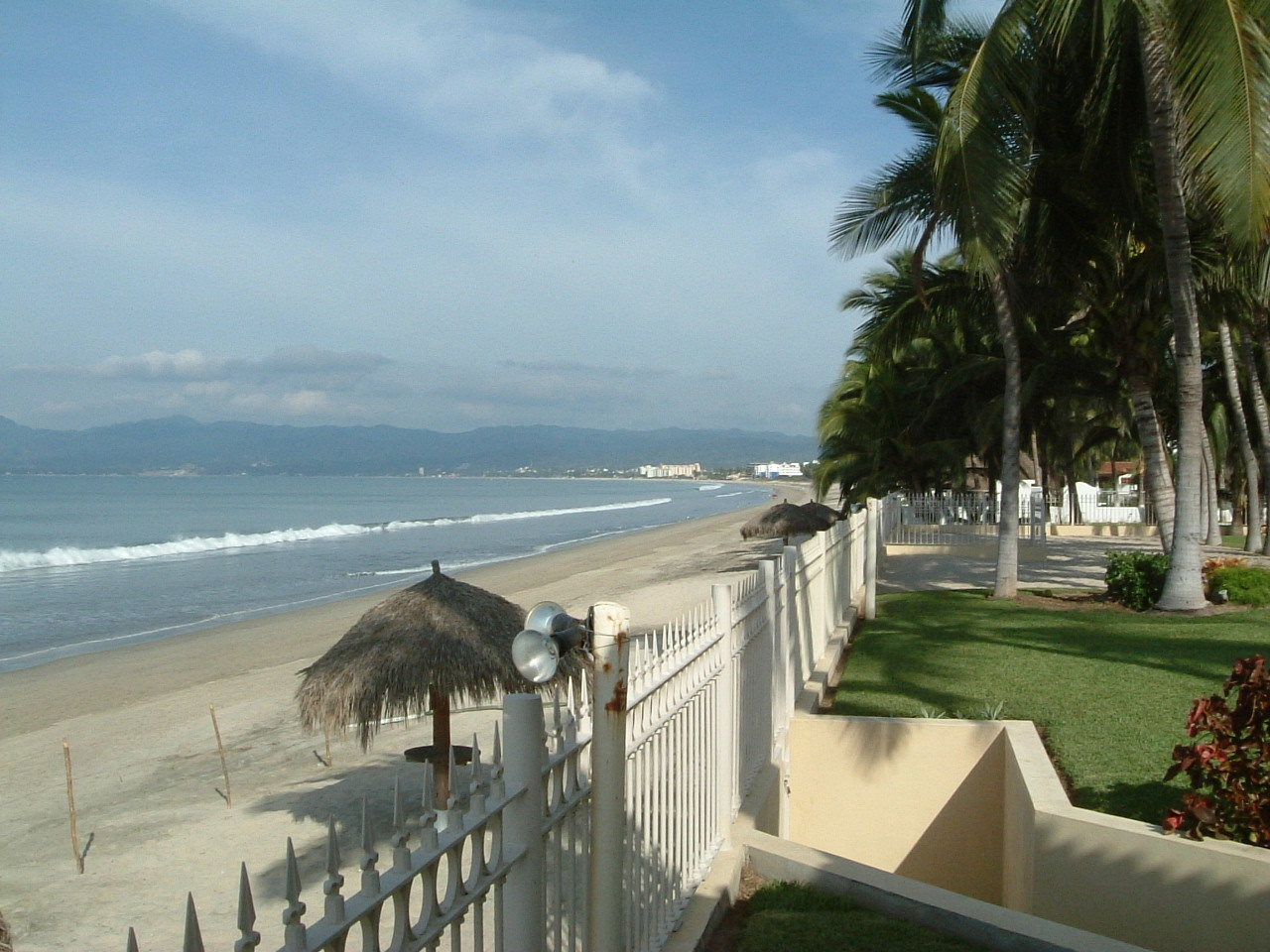

- Location in Mexico
- Coordinates: 20°42′N 105°18′W
- Country: Mexico
- State: Nayarit
- Municipality: Bahía de Banderas

Population (2010)
  - Total: 1,302

Nuevo Nayarit (Spanish pronunciation: ['nweβo na.ʝaˈɾit̪]), formerly known as Nuevo Vallarta, is a residential-resort community located in the Municipality of Bahía de Banderas, in the Mexican state of Nayarit. By automobile, it is about fifteen minutes north of Puerto Vallarta's Licenciado Gustavo Díaz Ordaz International Airport. Nuevo Nayarit receives many tourists from both the United States/Canada and also the United Kingdom. It has many malls and stores that accept payment in Mexican pesos or U.S. dollars.

== History ==
The Mexican federal government began the project over twenty years ago. The community is currently home to luxury villas and estates that include canals lined with tropical gardens, each with private docking piers.

The area also offers new deluxe resort amenities on more than 5 miles of white sandy beach. The marina development features a 3,000-slip state-of-the-art marina and PADI 1-Star Career Development Dive Center. Condominiums are also available to visitors and residents alike.

Between 1980 and 1990, Nuevo Nayarit's population increased from 57,028 to 111,457 inhabitants. A new marina is under construction, and the constructors have fifteen long-term lease programs. The construction consists of the removal of existing docks, pilings, and ramps in order to build six new docks with 230 mooring spaces ranging from 22 to 130 feet (6.7 to 39.6 m) long.

=== Renaming ===
In July 2022, the Nayarit state government officially renamed Nuevo Vallarta to Nuevo Nayarit. This decision aimed to strengthen the state's identity and ensure that tourists recognize the area as part of Nayarit, rather than associating it with neighboring Jalisco and its second-largest city, Puerto Vallarta. Governor Miguel Ángel Navarro Quintero advocated for the change to promote the state's own municipalities and identity, rather than promoting a municipality in the neighboring state.

== Fauna and climate ==
In winter, the caguama turtles lay their eggs on the beaches of Nuevo Nayarit. Caguama turtles have been in danger of extinction since 1978. Some people steal the turtle eggs and cook them; the police are trying to stop these illegal acts by taking the turtle eggs to a safe place with biologists and environmentalists who can take care of them.

The climate is as hot as (but a little less wet than) that of Puerto Vallarta due to the formation of mountains that surround the bay in which both sit -- conveniently protected from most hurricanes. The annual average temperature is 25 °C (77 °F) and in the summer months the high temperatures can reach 32 °C (90 °F).

== See also ==
- Municipalities of Nayarit
- Valle de Banderas
