= Hakkasan Group =

Hakkasan Group is a re-established restaurant group which originally was active from 2001 to 2021, and was later reestablished in 2025. The group was originally founded by chef Alan Yau, a Hong Kong-born British restaurateur, and is named for his restaurant Hakkasan, founded in London but later expanded across the globe. The 2025 reestablishment was headed by Mark Scheinberg, one of the founders of PokerStars who acquired Hakkasan in 2023 when his investment firm Mohari acquired the former assets of the group in 2023

The first Hakkasan Group was owned by Khadem al-Qubaisi, an Emirati businessman and a central figure in the 1MDB scandal. al-Qubaisi would later acquire Angel Management Group, a Las Vegas-based nightclub operator, and would later acquire various other groups. These acquisitions most notably included a majority stake in Los Angeles-based restaurant and lounge company the h.wood group, and The Light Group, a major Las Vegas nightclub operator. During the first half of the 2010s, Hakkasan would open and operate many notable Las Vegas nightclubs, including the Hakkasan Nightclub at MGM Grand Las Vegas, 1OAK at The Mirage, and Omnia at Caesars Palace. In 2016, the United States Department of Justice would begin its investigations into the 1MDB scandal, and from 2017 to 2021, the Hakkasan Group itself became the subject of acquisition rumors, including a proposed but later called-off merger with Sam Nazarian's company SBE.

In 2021, Tao Group Hospitality, then majority owned by Madison Square Garden owned James Dolan, would acquire Hakkasan for $99 million. By 2023, Dolan would sell his stake in the Tao Group to Scheinberg in a transaction which valued the entire group at $550 million, and in 2025, Scheinberg would establish the second incarnation of the Hakkasan Group.

== First incarnation (2001-2021) ==
=== 2001-2008 ===
The story of the group highly mirrors the story of the Hakkasan restaurant itself. According to a Tao Group Hospitality company blog, Yau grew up in Hong Kong but traces his lineage to the Hakka people, a Chinese ethnic minority. Yau opened the first Hakkasan restaurant at 8 Hanway Place near Bedford Square, later expanding Hakkasan to a second location in Mayfair.

=== 2008-2016 ===
Hakkasan Group was originally owned by an Abu Dhabi-based investment firm named Tasameem Real Estate LLC, which is a personal investment vehicle of Khadem al-Qubaisi, an Emirati businessman. During the 2010s, Hakkasan engaged in various acquisitions, many of the most prominently covered of which were successful. Hakkasan first merged with the nightclub Angel Management Group, in 2012, to assist with the Las Vegas nightlife plans the group had.Hakkasan also onboarded Angel CEO Neal Moffitt as their own CEO, who held the position until he resigned and liquidated his interests in 2017. In 2014, Hakkasan acquired The Light Group and its portfolio for $36 million, which included 1OAK from The Mirage and Light Nightclub at Mandalay Bay, at the time all operated at MGM properties; Light was the group which is credited with creating the bottle service model which operates at most Las Vegas nightclubs. That same year, Hakkasan purchased a 51% majority stake in the Los Angeles based The H.wood Group. Hakkasan itself would transform PURE, an old Angel nightclub at Caesars Palace, into Omnia in 2015; the next year, Hakkasan would also open Jewel at Aria Resort and Casino.

=== 2016-2021 ===
The Hakkasan Group's expansion was funded by al-Qubaisi, who was also at the center of the 1MDB scandal. Under al-Qubaisi, Business Insider published allegations that Hakkasan was funded by proceeds from the 1MDB scandal, which Sarawak Report later discovered records which confirmed al-Qubaisi was personally guaranteeing Hakkasan funds. al-Qubaisi resigned from the Hakkasan Group's chair position in 2016, while Moffitt resigned in 2017; Moffitt was replaced by Nick McCabe.

Sam Nazarian's company SBE entered into negotiations to acquire Hakkasan Group in 2017, with the rationale being merging the two companies' Vegas portfolios, though the merger ultimately was cancelled.

As early as 2018, Hakkasan Group itself became the target of acquisition speculation after the failed SBE acquisition. That same year, partners in h.wood group reacquired the assets of the group away from Hakkasan and restarted it as an independent company. Nation's Restaurant News published that the leading contenders in 2018 to acquire Hakkasan included the investment firm Certares and The Pacha Group, the latter of which is known for its Ibiza operations. Furthermore, Hakkasan lost chef Brian Malarkey in 2018, whose restaurants Searsucker and Herringbone were acquired by the group prior.

During the COVID-19 pandemic, Hakkasan permanently laid off over 1,600 employees. Hakkasan also closed its Shanghai restaurant in April 2020, though it would reopen the following October. Hakkasan would not reopen their clubs until March 2021.

=== Acquisition by Tao Group Hospitality ===
In 2021, Tao Group Hospitality would announce that it would acquire Hakkasan Group in its entirety for $99 million. The newly combined Tao Group would own five Las Vegas Strip nightclubs, bundling Tao Asian Bistro's nightclub at The Venetian and Marquee Nightclub at The Cosmopolitan of Las Vegas with Hakkasan, Omnia, and Jewel. In 2023, a majority stake in the Tao Group would itself be sold by James Dolan, who owned the group at the time, to Mark Scheinberg's investment firm Mohari. Dolan's 67% stake was sold in a transaction where the entire group in 2023 was valued at $550 million.

== Second incarnation (2025-present) ==
In 2025, Mohari reestablished the Hakkasan Group, with the intent of reestablishing the group as a fine dining company anchored by the Hakkasan, Ling Ling, and Sake no Hana brands. Scheinberg would hire Yavuz Pehlivanlar, who was formerly the COO at Richard Caring's Caprice Holdings, and which owns Sexy Fish and Scott's Mayfair.
