= Yauatcha =

Chinese restaurant in London, England

Coordinates: 51°30′50″N 0°8′7″W

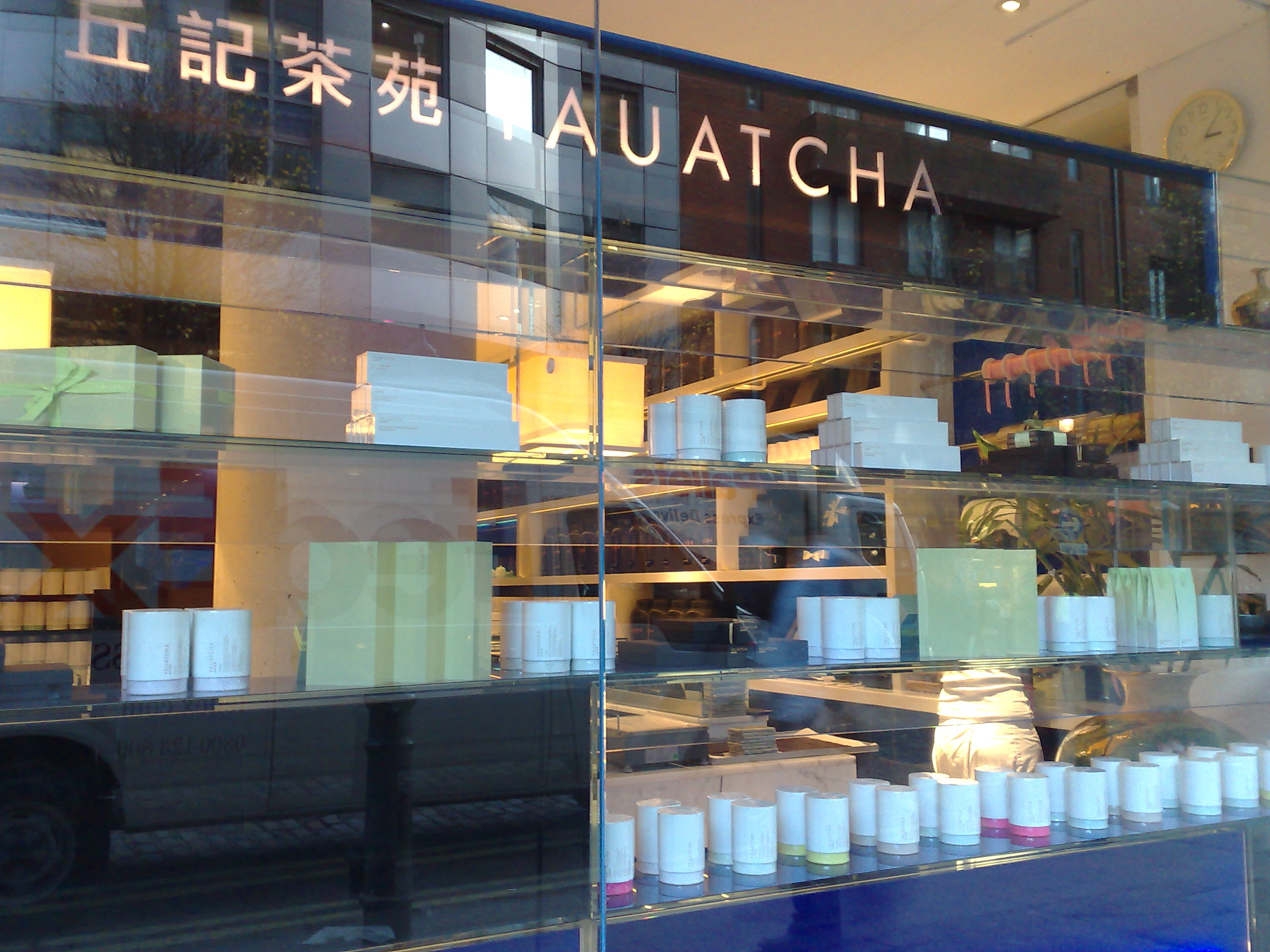
- Yauatcha storefront
- Traditional Chinese: 丘記茶苑
- Simplified Chinese: 丘记茶苑
- Cantonese Yale: yau1 gei3 cha4 yun2
Transcriptions
Standard Mandarin
- Hanyu Pinyin: Qiū jì cháyuàn
Yue: Cantonese
- Yale Romanization: yau1 gei3 cha4 yun2
- Jyutping: jau^{1} gei^{3} caa^{4}jyun^{2}

Yauatcha is a Chinese restaurant in Broadwick Street, Soho, London, England, specialising in dim sum.

The restaurant was created in 2004 by Alan Yau, who previously created the Japanese Wagamama and Thai Busaba Eathai restaurant chains as well as the more expensive Hakkasan restaurant, also in London. Like Hakkasan, Yauatcha gained a Michelin star rating in 2005, which it lost in 2019.

In January 2008, Yau sold a majority interest in Yauatcha and Hakkasan to Tasameem, part of the Abu Dhabi Investment Authority.

Yauatcha opened a branch in Mumbai in December 2011, and another branch in Bangalore in September 2013, Delhi in November 2013 Kolkata in September 2014, with Honolulu and Houston locations both opening later in 2017. The Honolulu and Houston locations have since closed.

== See also ==
- List of Chinese restaurants
