= Studio 54 (Las Vegas) =

Former nightclub in Paradise, Nevada

Coordinates: 36.103°N 115.170°W

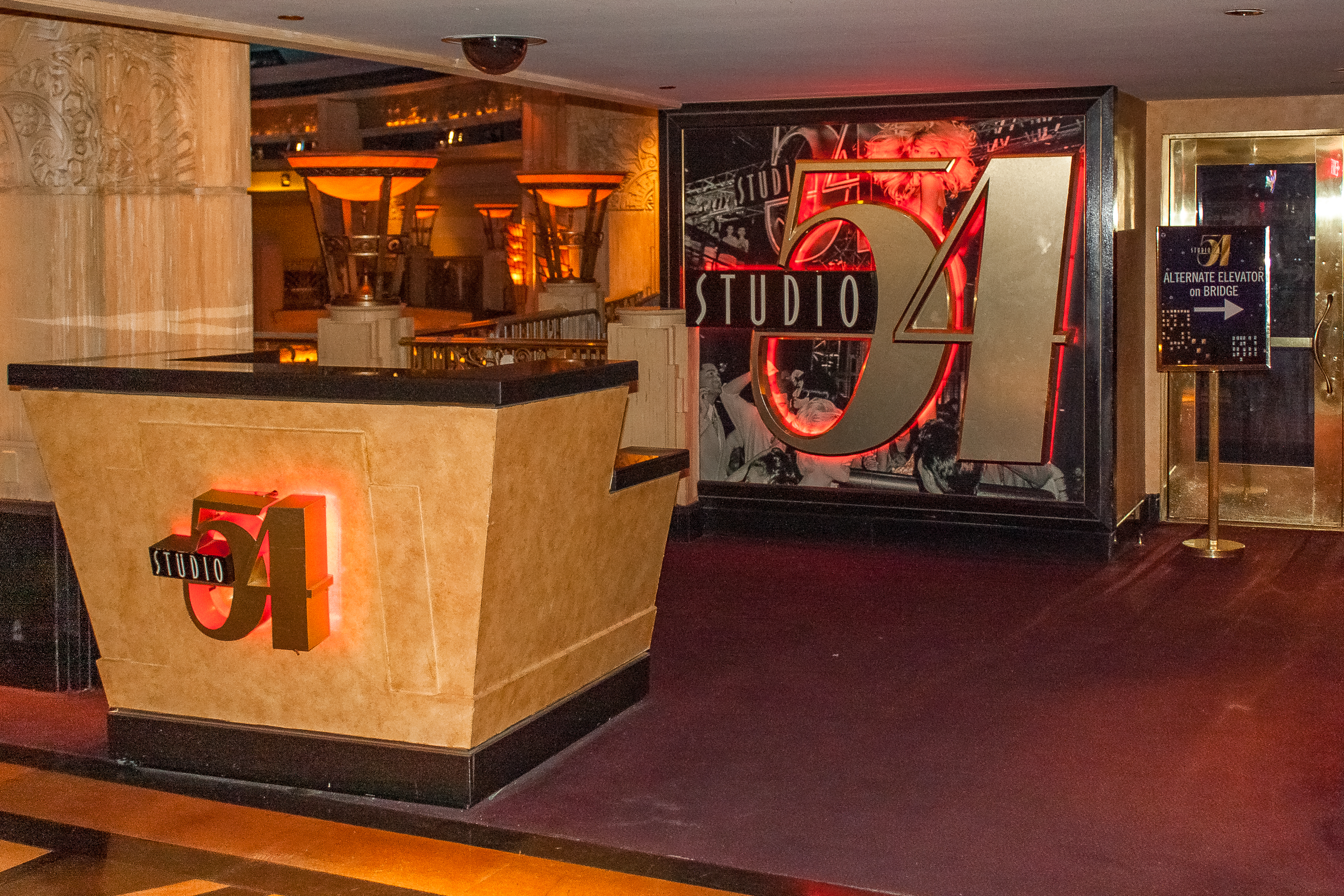
- Studio 54 Las Vegas (2008)
- Interactive map of Studio 54
- Address: 3799 Las Vegas Boulevard South; Las Vegas, Nevada 89109; United States
- Owner: MGM Grand
- Type: Nightclub

Construction
- Opened: December 1997
- Closed: February 2012

Studio 54 was a nightclub at the MGM Grand in Las Vegas that opened in December 1997 and closed in February 2012.

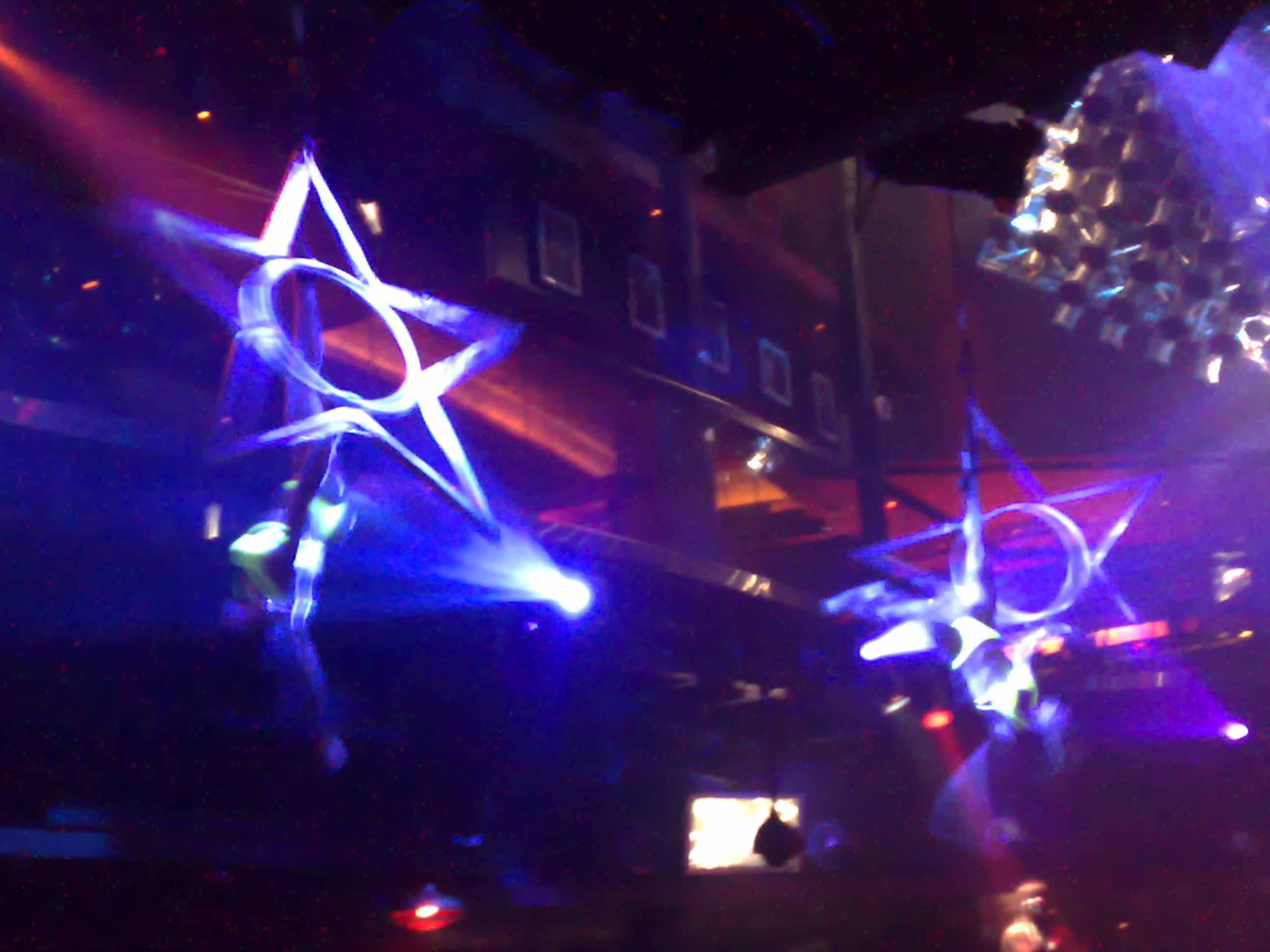
The inside of Studio 54

The nightclub displayed some memorabilia from the original Studio 54 in New York City, including photos of celebrities at the original nightclub.

It was visited on opening night by Elton John, one of the most frequent guests at the original location.

The venue is mentioned in the song Vegas Two Times by the Stereophonics.

In 2012, Studio 54 closed to be replaced by the London-based Cantonese restaurant Hakkasan, including Hakkasan's first ever nightclub. The props from Studio 54 were due to be scrapped in 2016, but was attempted to be saved by a former manager from MGM. The collection, now housed in a warehouse, includes rare photographs and decor from the club’s heyday, including massive prints of Donna Summer and Tim Curry. Some of it was displayed at a special First Friday event in downtown Las Vegas in 2016, with part of the proceeds benefiting a local women’s shelter.
