= Hakkasan =

Restaurant chain

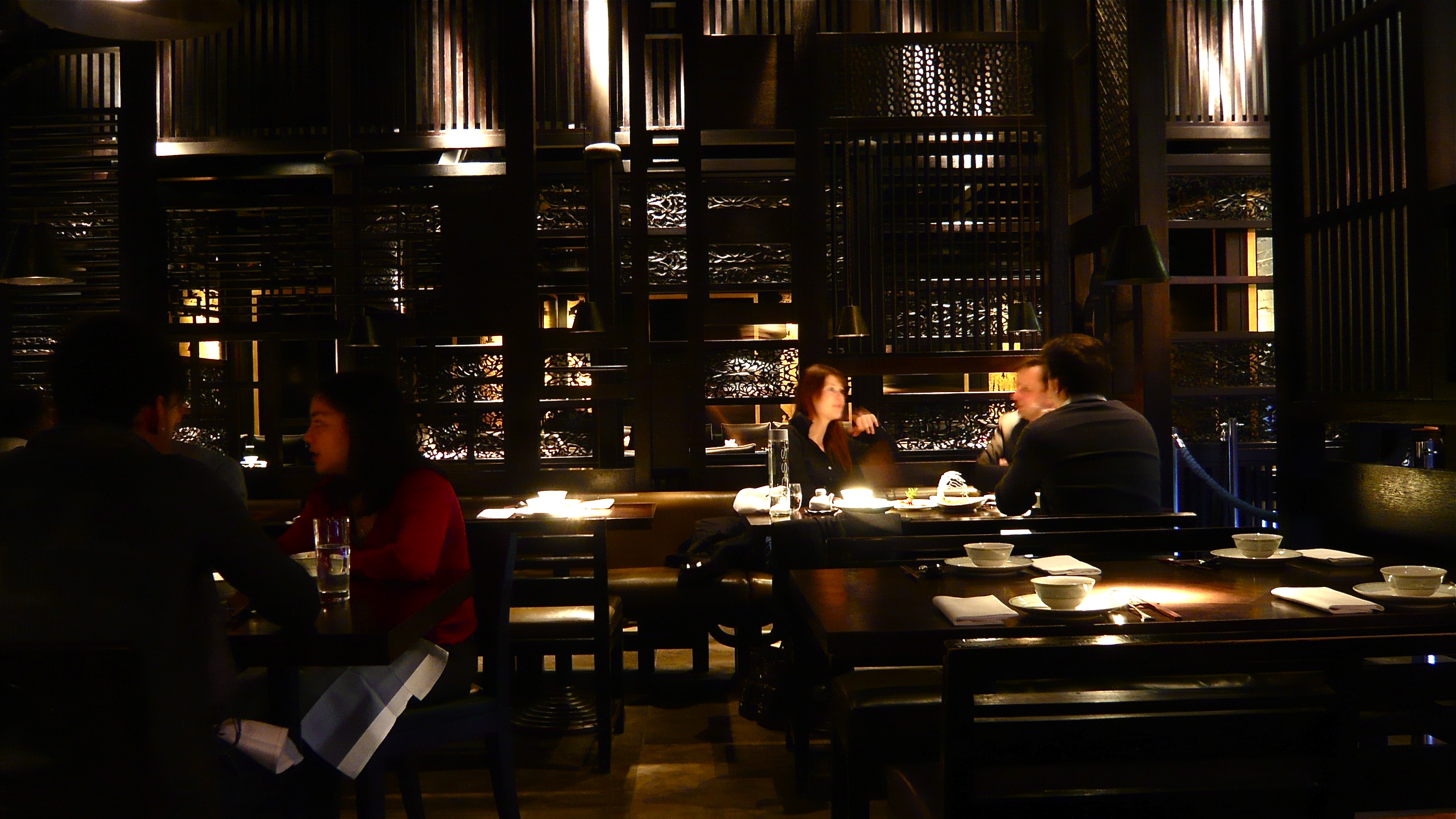
- Hakkasan's London location

Restaurant information
- Established: 2001
- Owner: Mark Scheinberg
- Food type: Cantonese
- Location: China India; Oman; Qatar; Spain; Turkey; United Arab Emirates; United Kingdom United States
- Website: taogroup.com

Hakkasan is a Cantonese restaurant and hospitality group originating in London. Its first restaurant was founded in 2001 by Alan Yau, who was also behind the Wagamama Japanese restaurants and later the Yauatcha restaurant. Hakkasan serves modern Cantonese cuisine fused with Western upscale dining experience. Hakkasan is the flagship brand of the Hakkasan Group, which existed from the restaurants founding up until 2021, and was reestablished in 2025; during the first incarnation of Hakkasan Group, the restaurant also opened a nightclub at its Las Vegas location which was one of the highest grossing nightlife venues in the United States in the early 2010s.

The Hakkasan Group expanded into multiple restaurants and concepts and by 2020 had operated 61 venues in 22 markets. After the COVID-19 pandemic caused many establishments to close though, Tao Group Hospitality acquired Hakkasan in 2021, a transaction facilitated by Tao's then-parent Madison Square Garden Entertainment prior to PokerStars founder Mark Scheinberg purchasing Madison Square Garden's stake in the merged entity. Scheinberg also facilitated the reestablishment of the Hakkasan Group in 2025.

== History ==
The restaurant opened in April 2001 at Hanway Place, London by Alan Yau. It distinguished itself from the other Chinese restaurants in London by offering upmarket fare combined with Western dining experience. In 2003, the Hanway Place location became one of the first Chinese restaurants in London to win a Michelin Star.

The restaurant has a distinctive interior designed by the French designer Christian Liaigre fusing modern aesthetic with traditional Chinese motifs, and features a carved wooden cage as dining space. Elements of the restaurant design are replicated in other Hakkasan restaurants., According to Robbie Bargh, whose company was involved at the inception of Hakkasan at Hanway Place, Hakkasan was built as an antithesis to Japanese concept Nobu, which in contrast to its natural and minimalist design, Hakkasan was "sexy", "naughty", and "provocative". Bargh also estimated that Hakkasan Hanway Place was one of the most expensive restaurants ever built, with it costing Yau between £14 and £15 per square foot in 2000.

In January 2008, Yau sold the majority interest of Hakkasan and Yauatcha to Tasameem Real Estate, an investment company based in Abu Dhabi. The restaurant expanded quickly, a second London restaurant covering two floors for up to 220 guests opened in November 2010 on Bruton Street in Mayfair. Other Hakkasan restaurants have opened in New York City, San Francisco, Miami, Shanghai, Mumbai, Abu Dhabi, Dubai and Jakarta, with 12 locations opened in total.

The Hakkasan Group opened a number of sister restaurants named Ling Ling in Marrakesh, Mykonos, Mexico City, as well as Aker Brygge in Oslo, Norway opened in April 2017. In April 2018, Hakkasan entered into a partnership with Grupo Vidanta to open a chain of venues including an Omnia Dayclub in Mexico. They have also opened a Dayclub Indonesia with KAJA Group and Alila Hotels, and more planned in Saudi Arabia. The group also intended to open boutique hotels.

In May 2020, the Hakkasan Group announced the permanent closure of their San Francisco restaurant due to economic impact of the COVID-19 pandemic. Later in the year, the New York branch also closed for the same reason. The original Hakkasan at Hanway Place closed after 24 years of operation in February 2025, but the Mayfair location remains operational.

== Hakkasan Nightclub ==
Hakkasan Nightclub

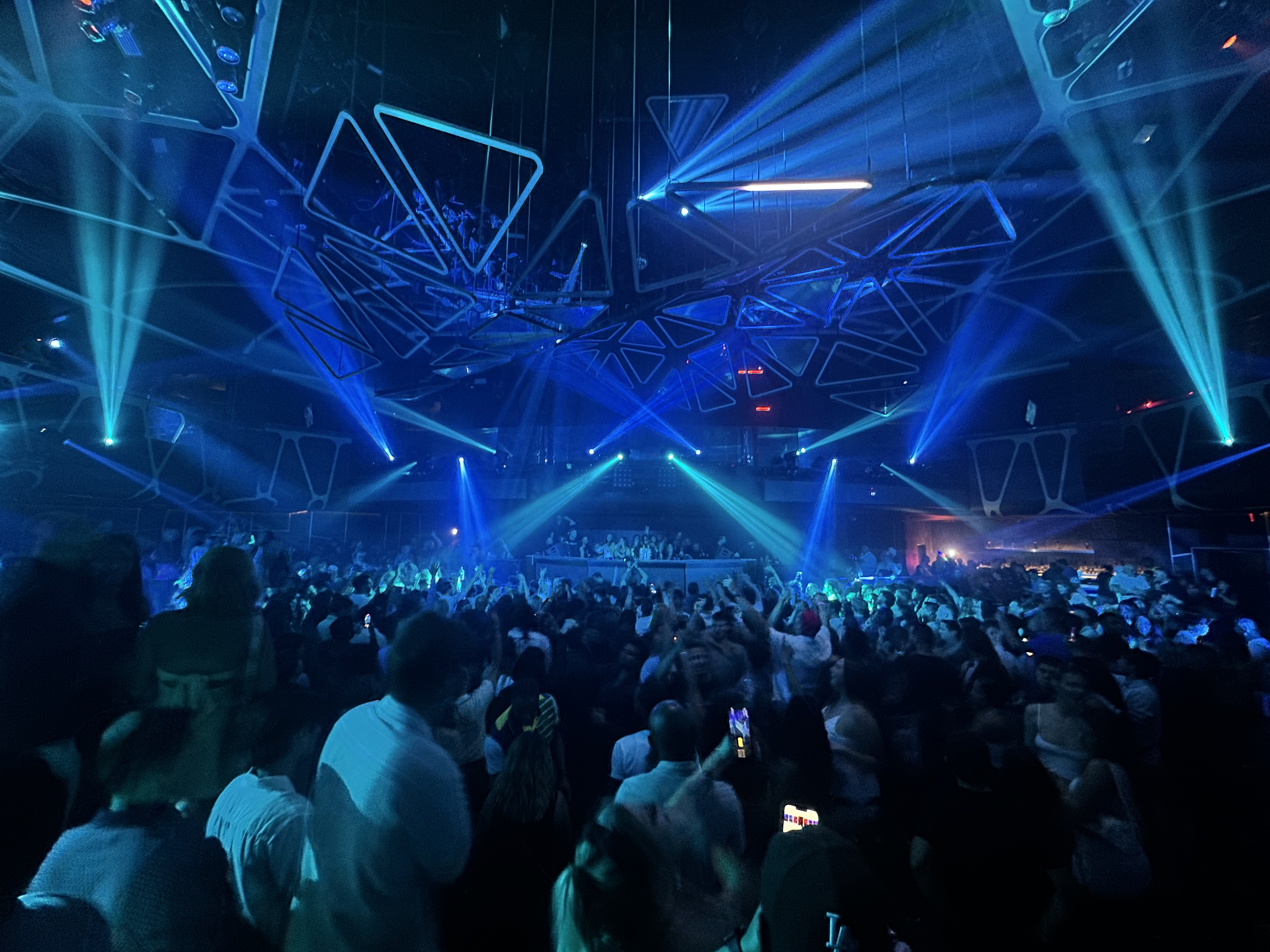
- The Hakkasan Nightclub in 2025, with Lil Jon performing
- Interactive map of Hakkasan Nightclub
- Former names: Studio 54 (1997-2012)
- Address: 3799 South Las Vegas Boulevard; Paradise, Nevada; United States
- Coordinates: 36.101518°N 115.171942°W
- Owner: Tao Group Hospitality
- Type: Nightclub

Construction
- Opened: 2013

Website
- taogroup.com/venues/hakkasan-nightclub-las-vegas/

In 2013, Hakkasan formed a partnership with Angel Management Group creating their first nightclub located at the MGM Grand in Las Vegas to replace Studio 54. The nightclub and restaurant would be combined into a five level complex taking up a combined floor space of 80,000 square feet across all floors.

The first two floors compose of the restaurant, while the 10,000 square foot third level would become a lounge, which some publications would refer to as the Ling Ling Lounge. The venue holds close to 7,500 patrons. It typically features world class DJs such as Calvin Harris, Hardwell, Nervo and Tiësto, some of which have regular residencies . DJs such as Tiësto are paid from $150,000 to $300,000 per night. In 2013, the opening year of the nightclub, Hakkasan spent $65 million that year on residencies, and the total cost of the Hakkasan project totaled to $100 million.

== Rankings ==
=== Restaurants ===
The London restaurant on Hanway Place gained its first Michelin star rating in January 2003, and became the first Chinese restaurant in Britain to earn a Michelin star. The second restaurant opened in Mayfair also received a Michelin star in 2012; both lost their Michelin star in 2024. In the British magazine Restaurant annual global ranking of The World's 50 Best Restaurants, Hakkasan was ranked in the list from 2004 to 2009, for example, it was rated 14th in 2004, and 19th in 2008.

=== Nightclub ===
The Hakkasan nightclub in Las Vegas was ranked No. 3 in the list of Top 100 clubs by DJ Magazine in 2015. As of the most recent edition of DJ Magazine's rankings, Hakkasan placed 58th.

== Hakkasan Group ==
Hakkasan is organized into the Hakkasan Group, which spread across two incarnations. The first incarnation operated numerous restaurants and nightclubs, including Ling Ling, Yautacha, Searsucker, Sake no Hana, Herringbone, and Casa Calavera. Furthermore, the group expanded its nightlife footprint beyond the Hakkasan Nightclub and operated Omnia, Level Up, Jewel, Liquid Pool Lounge, and Wet Republic. In Atlantic City, Hakkasan also operated HQ, a nightclub and dayclub at Ocean Casino Resort, then known as the Revel. The second incarnation of the Hakkasan Group, founded in 2025, consists of Hakkasan, Ling Ling, and Yautacha, and is intended by Mark Scheinberg, the founder of PokerStars who acquired a majority stake in Hakkasan in 2023 via his investment firm Mohari, to be a fine-dining company.

== In popular culture ==
The restaurant was featured in the film About A Boy.

== See also ==
- List of Chinese restaurants
