= Isai Scheinberg =

Canadian businessman

- ישי שיינברג
- Born: 1946/47; Vilnius, Lithuania
- Occupations: Co-founder and former co-owner, PokerStars
- Children: Mark Scheinberg

Isai Scheinberg (Hebrew: ישי שיינברג; born 1946 or 1947) is the Lithuanian Jewish founder of the PokerStars online poker site. Scheinberg previously had been a senior programmer for IBM Canada.

== Biography ==
In about 1986, Scheinberg left Israel, and moved to Toronto. He settled there in Richmond Hill, where in 2011 he still owned the house he had bought in 1988.

In 2011, Scheinberg was indicted on five criminal charges related to Pokerstars under United States federal laws. In September 2020, he was sentenced to pay a fine of $30,000 with no jail time.

Scheinberg and the co-owners sold Pokerstars to Amaya Gaming in 2014 for $4.9 billion.

Well known for his sense of personal privacy, he gave his first ever media interview to Lance Bradley in 2021.

== See also ==
- United States v. Scheinberg
