= Wagamama =

British restaurant chain specialising in Japanese style cuisine

Wagamama Limited
- Formerly: China Diner Limited (1991–1992)
- Type: Subsidiary
- Industry: Restaurant
- Genre: Japanese-inspired Chinese restaurant + noodle bar
- Founded: 29 April 1991; 35 years ago
- Founder: Alan Yau
- Headquarters: London, England, UK
- Number of locations: 228 (2026)
- Area served: List: Austria; Cyprus; Denmark; Gibraltar; Great Britain; Greece; India; Ireland; Italy; Malta; Netherlands; Northern Ireland; Oman; Qatar; Romania; Saudi Arabia; Slovakia; Turkey; United Arab Emirates; United States
- Key people: Mark Chambers (CEO)
- Revenue: ▲£1.2 billion (2025)
- Owner: Apollo Global Management
- Parent: The Restaurant Group
- Website: wagamama.com

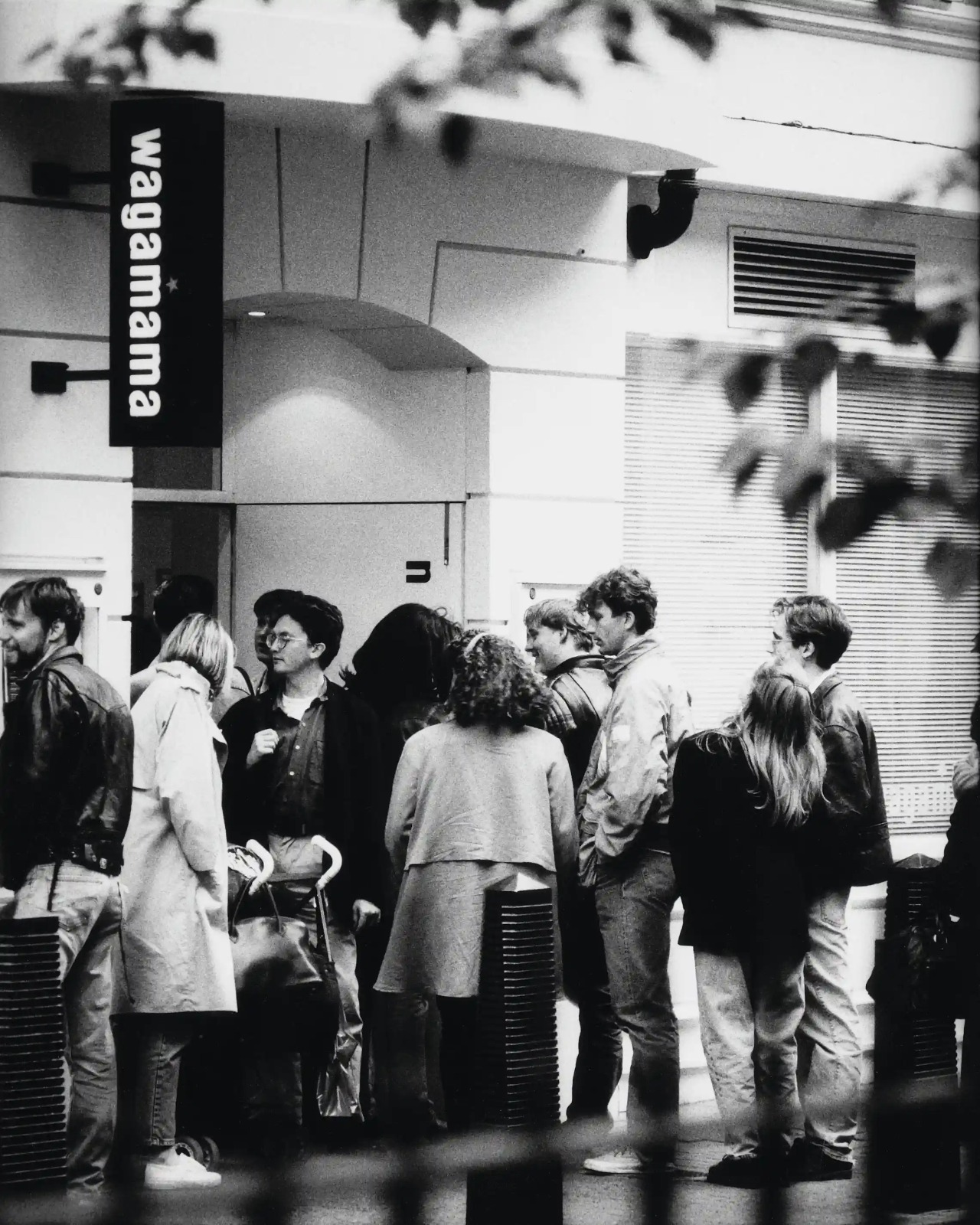
Wagamama, in Streatham Street, London. On its opening day. 22 April 1992

Wagamama Limited is a British restaurant chain headquartered in London, specialising in pan-Asian cuisine such as ramen, teppanyaki, and donburi. Founded in 1992 by Alan Yau, the brand opened its first location in Bloomsbury.

As of 2026, the chain operates 169 restaurants across the United Kingdom and maintains an international presence with over 80 additional sites through a mix of company-owned and franchised locations in Europe, the Middle East, and the United States.

== History ==
Wagamama Limited was incorporated on 29 April 1991 as China Diner Limited. Their first restaurant was opened in 1992 in Bloomsbury, London, founded by Alan Yau, who subsequently created the Chinese restaurants Hakkasan and Yauatcha, and Thai restaurant Busaba Eathai. In June 2005, the restaurant's owner Graphite Capital sold the majority stake of 77.5% to Lion Capital LLP for £103 million. In April 2011, the chain was sold to Duke Street Capital, for an estimated sum of £215 million.

The first site on Streatham Street, Bloomsbury, London, closed permanently on 19 June 2016.

The chain was acquired for £559m by The Restaurant Group, owner of Frankie & Benny's & Chiquito in October 2018. In October 2023 The Restaurant Group was taken over by Apollo Global Management in a deal worth over £700m. Following this restructuring, TRG focused its growth strategy primarily on Wagamama's international expansion.

In September 2024, The Restaurant Group (TRG) announced plans to increase the number of UK restaurants from 161 to 200-220.

Wagamama has released three cookbooks in order to further extend its brand.

== Locations ==
As of 2025, Wagamama has established an international presence with franchised restaurants in 22 countries across Europe and the Middle East. There are also 8 company owned locations in the United States.

Previous countries served by the Wagamama brand include Australia from 2002 to 2014, New Zealand until 2019, and Belgium from 2005 to 2024.

== Name ==
The word wagamama (わがまま) is Japanese for "self-indulgent", "self-centred", "picky", "fussy", "disobedient", or "wilful". Wagamama brands itself as following the process of kaizen.

== Menu ==
Wagamama sells dishes including bao, curries, donburi, teppanyaki grill noodles, ramen and pho. As of 2021, they committed to a menu with 50% vegan dishes.

== Corporate affairs ==
=== Environmental record ===
In November 2015, the chain was named by the Marine Conservation Society as one of seven restaurants surveyed that failed to meet a basic level of sustainability in its seafood. However, this was later retracted, as Wagamama revealed more information about the origin of its seafood.

=== Employment rights ===
In December 2017, Wagamama apologised after it was revealed some workers in Finchley were warned they would face disciplinary action if calling in sick over Christmas. The manager of the North Finchley branch asserted it was the responsibility of staff members, according to their contracts and handbook, to find somebody to cover their shifts. Wagamama said this was an isolated incident, not part of its employment policy.

=== Covid/quarantine losses ===
During the COVID-19 pandemic and subsequent quarantine, Wagamama’s owner, The Restaurant Group closed 250 restaurants, with a loss of nearly 4,500 jobs.

== See also ==
- List of Japanese restaurants
