= Khadem al-Qubaisi =

Emirati businessman

- Born: Khadem al-Qubaisi; September 27, 1971 (age 54); Abu Dhabi, United Arab Emirates
- Education: United Arab Emirates University
- Occupation: Former Head of the International Petroleum Investment Company

Khadem Abdullah al-Qubaisi (Arabic: خادم عبد الله القبيسي; born September 27, 1971) is an Emirati businessman and the former managing director of the International Petroleum Investment Company (IPIC). In 2015, he was replaced as managing director of IPIC and later investigated in a series of probes into misappropriated funds in connection with 1Malaysia Development Berhad. He was arrested in the United Arab Emirates in 2016 as part of investigations into the 1Malaysia Development Berhad scandal. In 2019, he was sentenced to 15 years in prison for corruption and money laundering.

== Life and education ==
Qubaisi was born in Abu Dhabi, United Arab Emirates in 1971. He graduated from the University of the United Arab Emirates with a bachelor's degree in economics in 1993. He is married, and has four children.

== Career ==
In 1993, after graduating from university, Qubaisi joined the Abu Dhabi Investment Authority (ADIA), where he went on to become a senior financial analyst in the North American Equities Department. In 2000, he became an investment manager at International Petroleum Investment Company. In May 2007, he became managing director, and in 2011, he took the additional position as chairman of IPIC's subsidiary, Compañía Española de Petróleos. He was chairman of many other companies including NOVA Chemicals, Arabtec, Borealis AG and OMV (in both of which IPIC owns a controlling interest), Aabar Investments (an IPIC subsidiary), Falcon Private Bank, Abu Dhabi National Takaful Company, and Hakkasan Group. He was the director of Tasameem Real Estate Co. LLC, the investment company of Sheikh Mansour bin Zayed Al Nahyan, who is a deputy prime minister of the United Arab Emirates and chairman of IPIC. Qubaisi also served on the board of Bahrain's First Energy Bank.

During his time at IPIC, Qubaisi was involved in several major deals, including the 2008 bailout of Barclays.

In April 2015, Qubaisi was removed from his role as managing director of the International Petroleum Investment Company. He resigned from or was replaced in his other positions in the following months.

== Controversy ==
Qubaisi was replaced as managing director of the International Petroleum Investment Company in April 2015. Following his dismissal from IPIC, he resigned or was replaced from most of his corporate roles in companies controlled by IPIC. In September of that year, a Malaysian investigative website Sarawak Report linked his dismissal to corruption allegations stemming from transactions IPIC undertook with 1Malaysia Development Berhad (1MDB), a strategic development company that became the subject of controversy when Malaysia's prime minister was accused of using it to siphon money into his personal bank accounts. In 2015, IPIC had given 1MDB $1 billion, and taken on $3.5 billion of their debt in return for some of 1MDB's assets. In April 2016, Reuters reported that the United Arab Emirates central bank had ordered banks in the UAE to freeze and provide transaction information on bank accounts belonging to Qubaisi or Mohamed al-Husseiny, another IPIC senior official. Officials investigating misappropriated funds in connection with 1MDB said that a total of $2.4 billion that was intended to be transferred from 1MDB to Aabar Investments was instead sent to a different company, established in the British Virgin Islands by Qubaisi and al-Husseiny, called Aabar Investments PJS Ltd.

On 20 July 2016, United States federal prosecutors filed a lawsuit to seize over $1 billion in assets believed to have been stolen from 1MDB. Qubaisi was named in these lawsuits, along with al-Husseiny and several others, which added that the funds were used to purchase these assets as well as "fund the co-conspirators' lavish lifestyles." This lawsuit is noted to be the largest forfeiture complaint filed in United States history.

In 2019, The Wall Street Journal reported that Qubaisi was being forced by the Emirati authorities to give away his assets to Sheikh Mansour bin Zayed Al Nahyan's privately owned company. Post his arrest, in an interview, Qubaisi said he was being blamed as a “scapegoat” by Sheikh Mansour. “I did this deal but I did it on behalf of the government of Abu Dhabi. They are putting everything on my back,” said Qubaisi.
