= Omnia (nightclub) =

Nightclub on the Las Vegas Strip

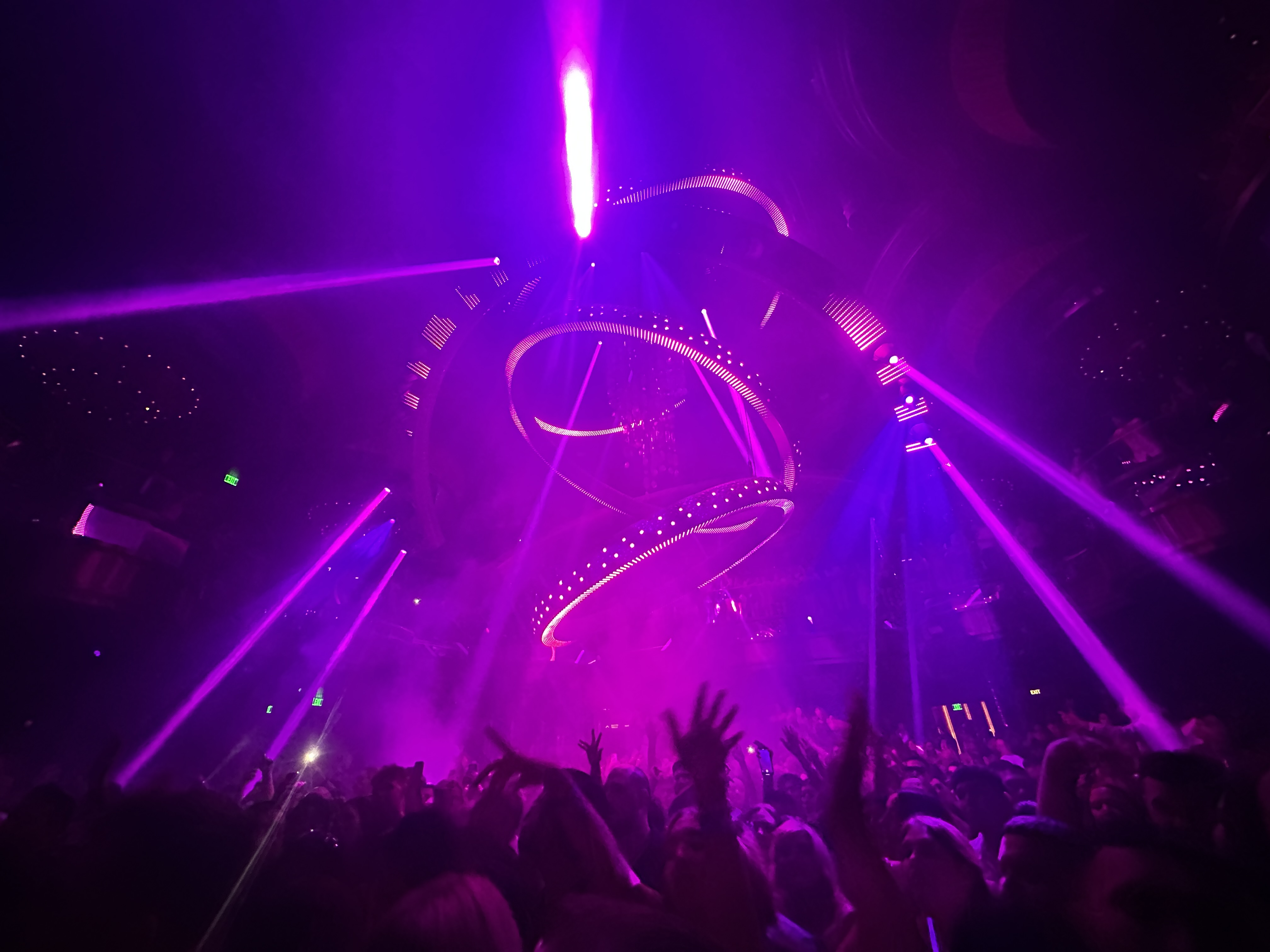
- Omnia in 2025
- Interactive map of Omnia
- Address: 3750 S Las Vegas Blvd; Paradise, NV; United States
- Coordinates: 36.11729°N 115.17415°W
- Operator: Tao Group Hospitality
- Type: Nightclub

Construction
- Opened: 2015

Website
- taogroup.com/venues/omnia-nightclub-las-vegas/

Omnia is a nightclub located at Caesars Palace on the Las Vegas Strip in Paradise, Nevada. Opened in March 2015, it has become a notable nightlife venue primarily for its central room's chandelier, featuring a design that incorporates technology and a lineup of resident DJs. Spanning 75,000 sq ft (7,000 m^{2}) across multiple levels, Omnia was designed by Rockwell Group and includes distinct areas such as a main club with a tall domed ceiling, an ultra-lounge referred to as the "Heart of Omnia," and an outdoor terrace with views of the Las Vegas Strip. The chandelier, referred to by the club as a "kinetic chandelier", weighs 22,000 lb (10,000 kg) while moving and lighting in sync to the music.

Named for a Latin word which roughly equates to "[the sum of] all things", Omnia replaced Pure Nightclub which operated at Omnia's current space for over a decade. The $107 million expansion and redesign incorporates both the 34,000 square feet (3,200 m^{2}) Pure facility and the adjacent World of Poker tournament room to create a 75,000 square feet (7,000 m^{2}) space that can accommodate 3,500 people. The club was first opened by the Hakkasan group, which itself in 2021 was acquired by Tao Group Hospitality.

== History ==
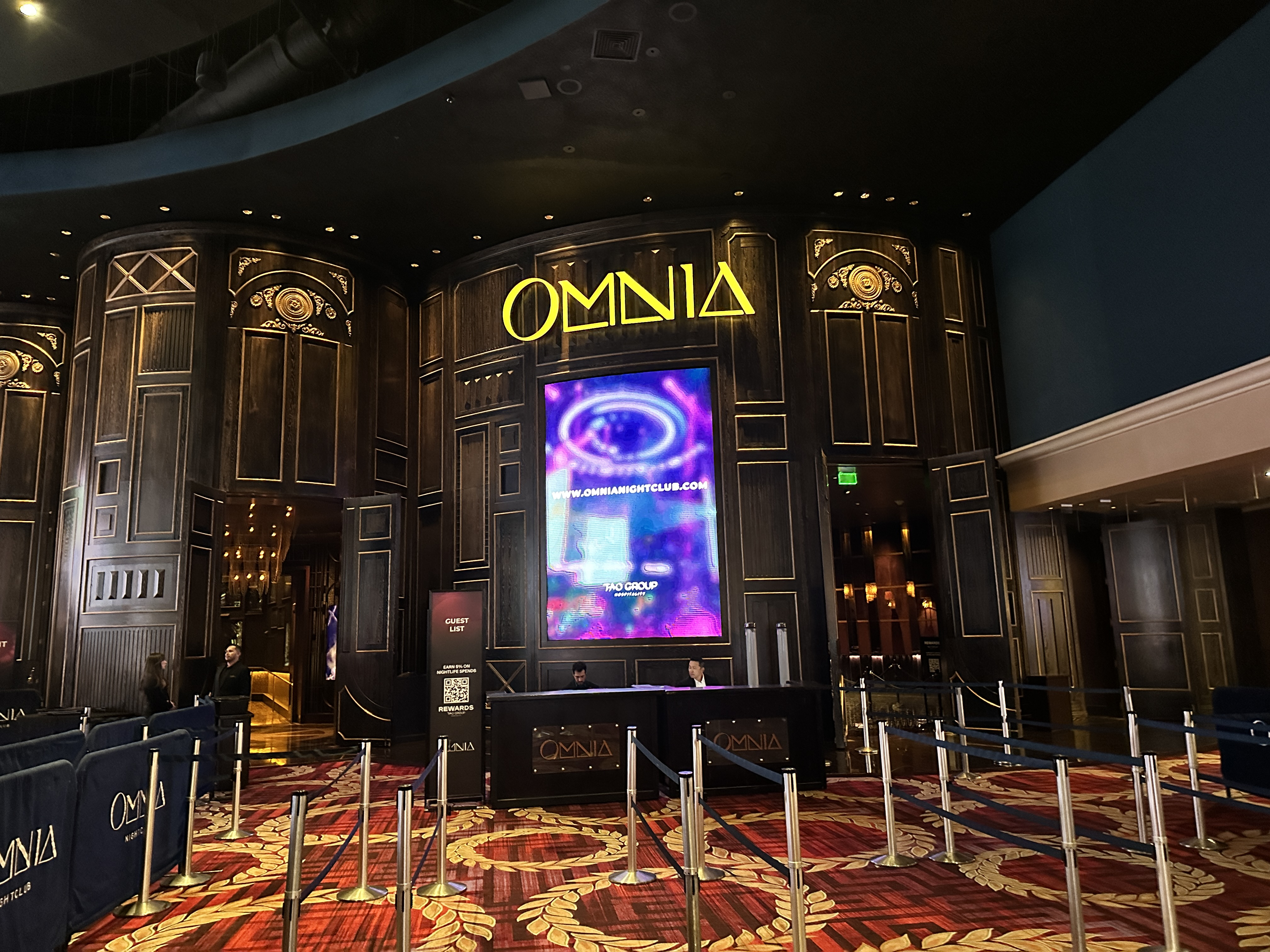
The entrance to Omnia within Caesars Palace

=== As Pure ===
Pure nightclub officially opened in 2004 in an era where any Las Vegas resorts were opening large and notable clubs. The company that operated the club itself held notable former owners among the likes of Shaquille O'Neal, Celine Dion, and Andre Agassi. The company that owned Pure also owned numerous other clubs on the Las Vegas Strip, such as LAX at the Luxor.

In 2008, Pure was investigated by the Internal Revenue Service for what would later be revealed to be a tip-concealing operation. Prosecutors would accuse Pure executive Steve Davidovici of paying himself in cash free tax bonuses by taking a share of tips for himself, often totaling to over six figures. Eventually in 2012, Davidovici was sentenced to three years of probation and eight months of house arrest.

Pure, according to Doug Elfman from the Las Vegas Review-Journal, was one of the clubs which defined the bottle service culture that exists in Vegas today. Elfman further characterized Pure as "lame" though only because it was around for about a decade, specifically comparing its lack of allure against XS.

In 2014, Pure closed and operations were transferred to the Hakkasan Group, which would hire David Rockwell's architecture firm to design Omnia.

=== As Omnia ===
==== Under Hakkasan Group ====
Omnia was first opened in 2015. The space at Caesars Palace was formerly occupied by the nightclub Pure, which was famously known for its celebrity sightings. Pure closed in 2015 to make room for Omnia, which would be designed by David Rockwell's group. The club cost $107 million to construct, though was originally estimated by Eater to cost $38 million.

Omnia opened on March 12, 2015, with Heart of Omnia, a separate club within Omnia which would replace Pure's "Pussycat Dolls Lounge", opening the following day. The club's first DJ was Calvin Harris. During the opening weekend, Justin Bieber also celebrated his 21st birthday. Upon opening weekend, Hakkasan Group was the largest non-gaming company on the Las Vegas Strip.

During the COVID-19 pandemic, once restrictions lifted, Omnia opted to open its outdoor terrace as a lounge only experience on March 5, 2021. Omnia would only allow table reservations though with spend requirements starting at $1,000, and no guest list or general admission would be sold.

==== Under Tao Group Hospitality ====
In April 2021, Tao Group Hospitality, itself then under the ownership of James Dolan's Madison Square Garden Entertainment, announced it would be acquiring Hakkasan Group, and by extension Omnia, in an all-equity transaction. The acquisition was rumored by the Las Vegas area press since at least January 2021, with the prior departure of the Hakkasan Group's former president Michael Ryan-Southern seen by Vital Vegas as confirmation of the potential deal alongside the rumored acquisition of Omnia by Tao as early as January.

Omnia was featured in the 2025 film F1 where Damson Idris' character Joshua heads to Omnia to unwind after a poker game. Tao Group co-CEO Jason Strauss commented in a magazine interview with Neon of the Las Vegas Review-Journal that the filming process inside the club involved frequent starts and stops, though praised the trailer for looking "sexy" after post-production. Tao and Mohari would also have resident DJ Tiësto cameo during the scene, and the club was later used as a filming set for the music video to "Messy", a song by Korean singer Rosé which was part of the film's album.

== Venue design ==
Omnia spans 75,000 sq ft (7,000 m^{2}) across three rooms, double the size of the former Pure, and also engulfed Caesar's former poker and World Series tournament rooms. Omnia's three rooms are the main club, the "Heart of Omnia", and the terrace. At the time of opening, Omnia was the only nightclub in Las Vegas with a sound system designed by L-Acoustics.

The entering hallways into Omnia are lined with LCD displays behind black glass which respond to guest movements with motion sensors.

Heart of Omnia is a hip-hop focused section of Omnia with a separate DJ from the main room and terrace. Designed by the Hakkasan Group in collaboration with The h.wood Group, which Hakkasan acquired in 2014, Heart is based on Hakkasan's Ling Ling Lounge, located inside within the Hakkasan Las Vegas nightclub at MGM Grand. The Hakkasan Group told the Los Angeles Times that it designed the lounge with "a rich and sultry material palette that plays on masculine and feminine design elements." The group further lined the Heart club's walls with LED screens.

== Kinetic chandelier ==
The chandelier drop at Omnia

The main room of Omnia features a lighting display named the "kinetic chandelier", composed of eight rings with lights attached to all of them. The chandelier was designed by Willie Williams and built by TAIT, then known as Tait Towers, with the chandelier alone taking about 2.5 years from initial concept to opening. A total of 21 winches in the chandelier enable the chandelier and each ring to freely move.

The inner three rings are part of the "Crystal Chandelier" portion, and from innermost to outermost, are approximately 3, 5, and 7 feet (0.9144, 1.5240, and 2.1336 meters) in diameter. These inner three rings collectively weigh 1,750 pounds (790 kg).

== Omnia Dayclub ==
In 2025, Caesars Palace and Tao unveiled plans to give Omnia a dayclub in front of the casino, while a pedestrian bridge would connect the dayclub and nightclub together. According to county documents, the 46,210 sq ft (4,293 m^{2}) dayclub will rise three stories high, culminating in an upper terrace above the main pool deck. The pool deck is the center of the design, featuring a total of four pools: two main pools with one at 869 sq ft (80.7 m^{2}) and another at 1,103 sq ft (102.5 m^{2}), and two plunge pools positioned on either side of the larger ones, each at 440 sq ft (41 m^{2}). The dayclub would feature cabanas, dedicated booths and chairs, multiple bar and service areas, and a DJ platform. The dayclub plans have received final approval by Clark County Commissioners after being first endorsed by the Paradise Town Advisory Board.

== Locations outside of Las Vegas ==
Prior to the 2022 acquisition of the Hakkasan Group by Tao, Omnia operated other clubs under its name in cities outside of Las Vegas.

Omnia's San Diego location opened shortly after the Vegas location opened. During the pandemic, however, Omnia was sued by male customers in a suit that alleged its "ladies nigiht" promotions discriminated against non-binary people and males by making them, and not ladies, pay full price for admission, with claims dating as far back as 2015. The suit, which cited the Unruh Civil Rights Act that had consistently been used to deem illegal most gender-oriented promotion nights, was settled in 2025 for approximately $7 million USD. Omnia San Diego's site was later sold by Tao to Live Nation Entertainment subsidiary Insomniac, and the club is open today as NOVA San Diego.

Omnia's first dayclub opened in Los Cabos Municipality at the Vidanta San Jose del Cabo, in February 2018, with Calvin Harris, Steve Aoki, and Zedd as initial headliners for the opening weekend. Then-CEO of Hakkasan Group Nick McCabe cited intentional expansion of nightlife and day life offerings in an interview with Billboard, saying that the group would be partnering with local firms on operations. The Instagram account for Omnia Los Cabos states that the Tao Group and Vidanta parted ways in 2022.

On the Indonesian island of Bali, McCabe also announced that Omnia would be opening a dayclub in 2018. The centerpiece of Omnia Bali was a cubic structure covered in glass beads and mirrored stainless steel, with the complex being not only a dayclub but also a nightclub, bar and restaurant. The venue, designed by the Rockwell Group, was located on a cliff overlooking the ocean, and designed to mirror Balinese architecture. In 2020, during the pandemic, Omnia Bali was sold off and renamed to Savaya.

== Notable performers ==
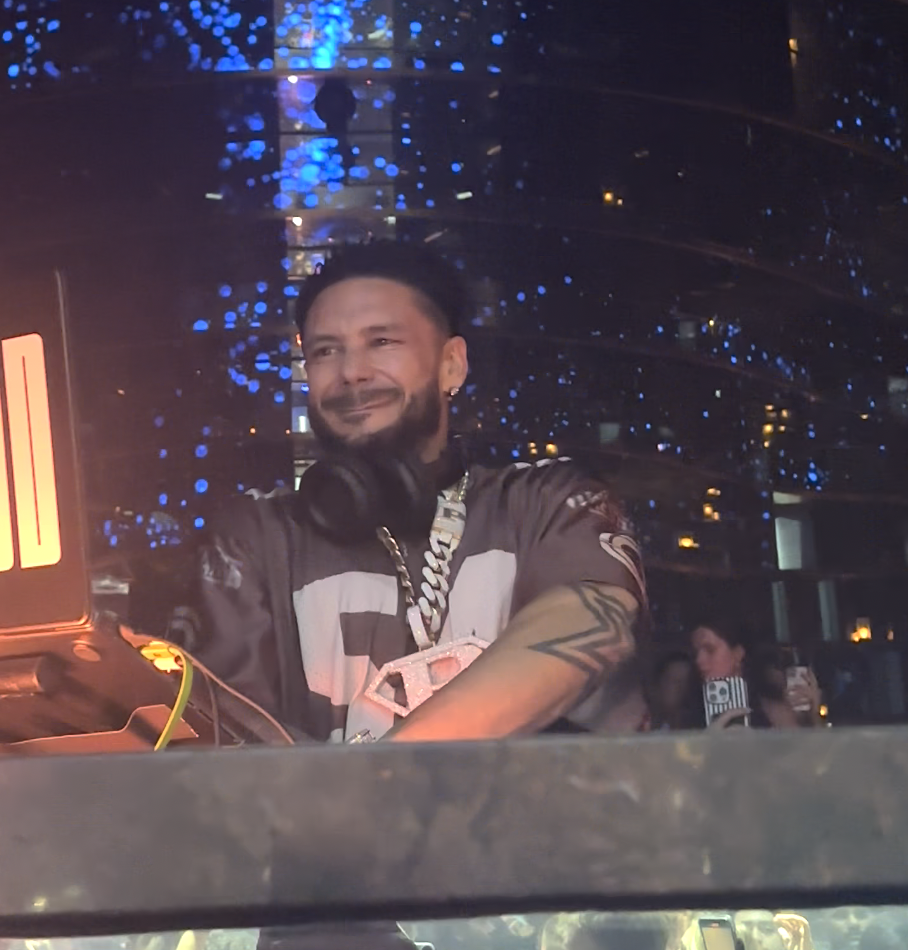
DJ Pauly D at Omnia Las Vegas on August 10, 2025

- Afrojack
- Alesso
- Armin van Buuren
- Brody Jenner
- Calvin Harris
- Cash Cash
- Celine Dion
- Chantel Jeffries
- Chris Lake
- Fisher
- Illenium
- Justin Bieber
- Kaskade
- Lil Jon
- Loud Luxury
- Martin Garrix
- Miley Cyrus
- Murda Beatz
- Nghtmre
- Party Favor
- Pauly D
- Questlove
- Rosé
- Rüfüs Du Sol
- Sean Combs
- Steve Aoki
- Tiësto
- Timmy Trumpet
- Travis Scott
- Tyga
- Zedd
