= Alan Yau =

Hong Kong-born British restaurateur

Alan Yau OBE
- 丘德威
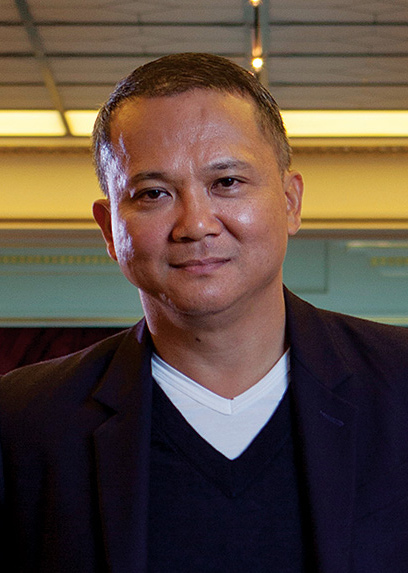
- Born: Yau Tak-wai; 11 November 1962 (age 63); Sha Tau Kok, British Hong Kong
- Citizenship: British
- Occupations: Entrepreneur, restaurateur
- Years active: 1992–present
- Known for: Wagamama, Hakkasan, Busaba Eathai, Yauatcha, Princi, Park Chinois, Babaji, Softchow
- Title: CEO of Softchow
- Awards: Michelin Star (Hakkasan, 2002); Michelin Star (Yauatcha, 2005); OBE (2006)

Alan Yau (Chinese: 丘德威) OBE (born 11 November 1962) is a Hong Kong-born British restaurateur who founded the Wagamama chain in the United Kingdom. Of Hakka ethnicity, he was born in Sha Tau Kok, Hong Kong and moved to King's Lynn, Norfolk in 1975 with his family.

Alan Yau started his career in 1992 founding Wagamama and was appointed an OBE in the 2006 New Year Honour's List for services to the restaurant industry. Following that, Alan founded numerous ventures in gastronomy such as Hakkasan (awarded a Michelin Star in 2003), Yauatcha (awarded Michelin star in 2005) and Park Chinois. In 2016 Alan pivoted into the software world and founded Softchow, a taste aggregation platform.

In April 2019, The Asian Awards honoured Alan for his culinary work with the "Outstanding Achievement in the Arts" award.

== Career highlights ==
=== Wagamama ===
Founded in 1992 by Yau, Wagamama is a ramen bar with nearly 200 locations globally as of early 2019. Yau left Wagamama in 1997.

=== Busaba Eathai ===
Founded in 1999, Busaba Eathai is a casual dining Thai restaurant chain. Yau left Busaba Eathai in 2008.

=== Hakkasan ===
Founded in 1999, Hakkasan was initially a fine dining Chinese restaurant which later expanded to include nightlife entertainment. Hakkasan was awarded a Michelin Star in 2003 and Yau exited Hakkasan in 2008.

=== Yauatcha ===
Founded in 2004 by Yau, Yauatcha is dim sum restaurant and patisserie tea house chain. Yauatcha was awarded Michelin Star in 2005. Yau left Yauatcha in 2008.

=== Princi UK ===
In collaboration with Rocco Princi, Yau founded Princi in 2008; an Italian Bakery in Soho. He sold his shares to Starbucks in 2016.

=== Cha Cha Moon ===
In 2008, a collaboration with Kuwaiti firm Kout Food Group saw Yau open Cha Cha Moon in Kingly Court, London, a ‘fast casual' Chinese noodle bar. A second location was launched in Whiteleys Shopping Centre, but closed down less than a year later to be transformed into Cafe Licious/Chi Wok/Pasta Rossa. The Kingly Court location closed in 2016 as Kout Food Group began to withdraw from the UK market.

=== Babaji ===
Founded in 2014 by Yau, Babaji was a Turkish Pide concept.

=== Duck and Rice ===
Founded in 2015 by Yau, Duck and Rice is a Chinese pub with comfort food in Soho, London.

=== Park Chinois ===
Founded in 2015, Park Chinois is a Chinese old school entertainment restaurant.

Similar to most of Yau's other creations, Park Chinois stays as authentic as possible to the restaurateur's heritage by drawing inspiration from popular dishes in 1930s Shanghai restaurants and supper clubs.

=== Softchow ===
Softchow was founded in 2017 by Yau as a "taste aggregation platform".

=== Chyna Club ===
Chyna Club opened at the Fontainebleau Las Vegas in February 2024 with their signature entrée being Peking duck.
