= MGM Grand Las Vegas =

Casino resort in Las Vegas, Nevada, US

- Logo featuring Leo the Lion

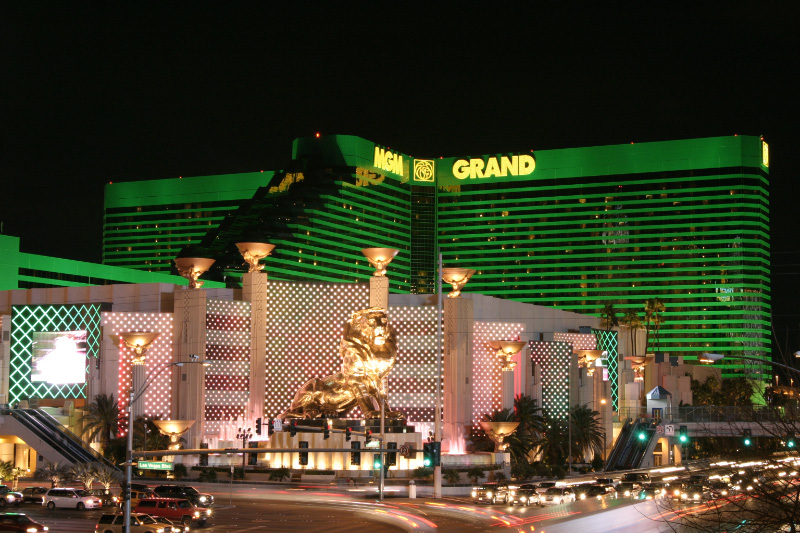

- Location within Las Vegas Strip Location within Nevada
- Interactive map of MGM Grand Las Vegas
- Location: Las Vegas, Nevada, U.S.; 3799 South Las Vegas Boulevard; 36.1022°N 115.1695°W
- Opened: December 18, 1993; 32 years ago
- No. of rooms: 4,762
- Gaming space: 171,500 sq ft (15,930 m^{2})
- Permanent shows: Brad Garrett's Comedy Club; David Copperfield; Jabbawockeez; Kà
- Signature attractions: MGM Grand Adventures (1993–2000); MGM Grand Garden Arena; Hakkasan; CSI: The Experience (2009–2020); Topgolf
- Notable restaurants: Joël Robuchon; L'Atelier de Joël Robuchon; Emeril's New Orleans Fish House; International Smoke; Craftsteak; Wolfgang Puck
- Casino type: Land-based
- Owner: Vici Properties
- Operating license holder: MGM Resorts International
- Renovated in: 1996–1998, 2011–12, 2017–2019, 2022, 2024–25
- Website: mgmgrand.com

The MGM Grand Las Vegas, often called The Grand Hotel or The MGM is a hotel and casino located on the Las Vegas Strip in Nevada. It is owned by Vici Properties and operated by MGM Resorts International. The resort was developed by Kirk Kerkorian through his company, MGM Grand, Inc. Kerkorian had previously developed another MGM Grand, which opened on the Strip in 1973, was renamed Bally's in 1986, and was again renamed Horseshoe in 2022.

Planning for the new MGM Grand began in 1989. The resort opened on December 18, 1993. With more than 5,000 rooms, it was the largest hotel in the world at the time of its opening. Much of the hotel is 30 stories, excluding a 14-story section, which originally opened as the Marina Hotel in 1975. The MGM Grand includes a 171,500 sq ft (15,930 m^{2}) casino, the world's largest at the time of opening. The resort's dominant theme was the 1939 MGM film The Wizard of Oz, although this theming was removed during a two-year renovation that began in 1996.

The MGM originally opened with a theme park, MGM Grand Adventures, which operated on 33 acres (13 ha) northeast of the resort. The total cost for the MGM Grand and its theme park was $1 billion. MGM Grand Adventures closed in 2000, with the property replaced by The Signature at MGM Grand, a condo hotel; and a Topgolf attraction.

The MGM has featured restaurants from several prominent chefs, including Emeril Lagasse, Michael Mina, and Joël Robuchon. From 1997 to 2012, it also included Studio 54, a nightclub featuring memorabilia from the original Studio 54 in New York. The resort has several entertainment venues, including the MGM Grand Garden Arena. Longtime shows at the resort have included Kà and magician David Copperfield.

== History ==
The property was originally the site of the Tropicana Country Club and the Golf Club Motel, both opened in the 1960s.

=== Marina (1975–1990) ===
Tom Wiesner, a Clark County Commissioner, co-founded Southwest Securities Development Company in 1972, and later founded Wiesner Investment Company. In November 1973, Southwest Securities was planning the Marina Hotel. It would be next to the Golf Club, which itself would receive a renovation. The Marina was built by Wiesner Investment Company, and opened on May 1, 1975.

The Marina was 14 stories, and contained 714 rooms, as well as a casino, two restaurants, and an entertainment lounge. The casino portion was initially operated by Allen Glick through his company, Argent Corporation. Fred Harvey Company served as operator of the hotel, its restaurants, and other areas of the property. Fred Harvey had previously opened other Marina-branded hotels in the United States. Meanwhile, the adjacent Golf Club Motel later operated as the Mariner, before being demolished in 1986 to become a parking lot for the larger Marina.

The Marina faced financial problems in February 1987, owing $700,000 to the Internal Revenue Service. Landlord Southwest Securities also filed a writ of attachment, seeking $393,000 in back rent from the resort's operators. The Marina filed for bankruptcy in March 1987, and gaming was briefly shut down the following month, after the casino cage bankroll fell below $256,000, a minimum set by the Nevada Gaming Control Board.

In 1989, Wiesner and his partners agreed to sell the Marina to Kirk Kerkorian, through his company MGM Grand, Inc. Also purchased was the Tropicana Country Club, located behind the Marina. Kerkorian announced plans to construct the MGM Grand Hotel and Theme Park on the parcels. The project was part of ongoing efforts to make Las Vegas a family friendly tourist destination. An earlier MGM Grand had been opened by Kerkorian in 1973, at the center of the Las Vegas Strip; it was rebranded as Bally's in 1986. The present MGM is located near the southern end of the Strip, at the Tropicana – Las Vegas Boulevard intersection.

Kerkorian's $80 million purchase of the Marina was completed in January 1990. The hotel structure was remodeled and briefly operated as the MGM Marina. The Tropicana Country Club closed later that year, followed by the MGM Marina on November 30, 1990, both making way for the MGM Grand. The Marina was incorporated into the MGM Grand, becoming its West Wing.

=== MGM Grand (1993–present) ===
A groundbreaking ceremony for the MGM Grand, heavily inspired by the resort's Wizard of Oz theme, was held on October 7, 1991. A topping off ceremony followed on February 23, 1993. Casino executive Clifford S. Perlman was named to oversee the resort and theme park, the latter known as MGM Grand Adventures. The MGM Grand and its theme park occupied 112 acres (45 ha), and cost a total of $1 billion to build.

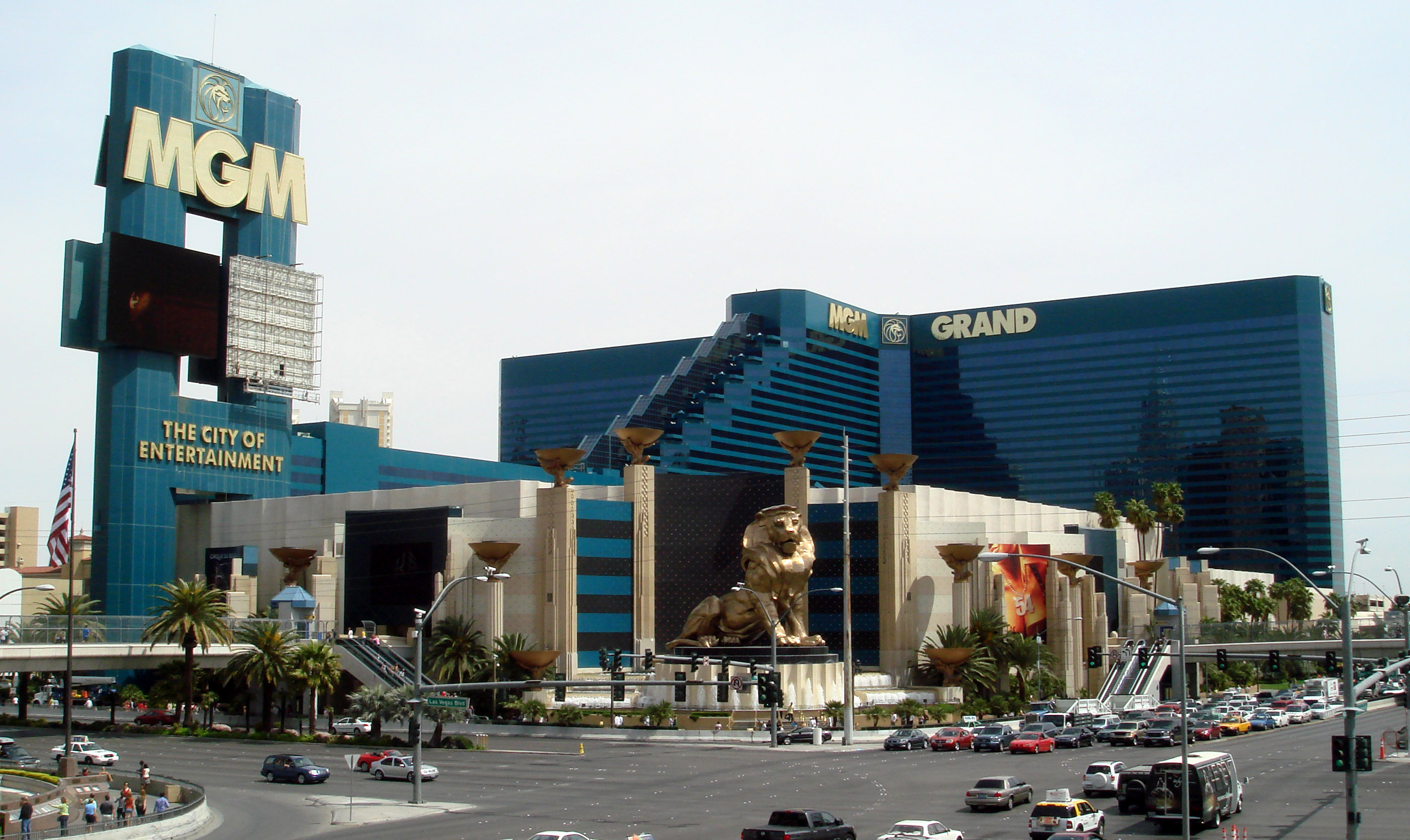
The MGM Grand and its Strip-side sign in 2008

The MGM Grand opened to the public on the morning of December 18, 1993, following a private VIP party for 3,000 guests the night before. The opening came three months earlier than initially planned, as construction proceeded ahead of schedule. The MGM employed 8,000 people. A 251-foot-high sign was added along the Strip shortly after the resort's opening, and was among the biggest signs in Las Vegas. A monorail opened in 1995, connecting the MGM Grand with Bally's. It served as a forerunner to the Las Vegas Monorail. In 1996, the MGM Grand received a four-star rating from Mobil Travel Guide.

Rapper Tupac Shakur visited the MGM on the night of his murder in 1996. He attended the Bruce Seldon vs. Mike Tyson boxing match at the resort, and subsequently got into a fight with gang member Orlando Anderson in the hotel lobby, before being shot later that night just off the Strip.

In mid-1996, MGM Grand, Inc. began a 30-month, four-phase renovation of the resort. Terrence Lanni, the chairman of MGM Grand, Inc., said he wanted customers to "feel like guests coming to a premiere of one of the world's greatest movies. When we're completed, every aspect of this property will bespeak entertainment." Much of the Wizard of Oz theming was removed during the renovation, and revenue improved substantially. As the resort marked its 10th anniversary, additional renovation work was underway to help it compete against the nearby Mandalay Bay. A $160 million hotel renovation took place from 2011 to 2012, marking the first makeover for the rooms in more than a decade. The West Wing was renamed the Studio Tower in 2022, following renovations. A $300 million renovation of the other hotel rooms concluded in 2025, after nearly a year.

In January 2020, MGM Resorts announced that it would sell the resort to a joint venture consisting of MGM Growth Properties and The Blackstone Group. MGM Growth would own 50.1 percent of the joint venture, and Blackstone would own the remainder. The MGM Grand would be leased to MGM Resorts, which would continue to operate the resort. The deal was finalized a month later. Vici Properties bought MGM Growth in April 2022, and then bought out Blackstone's stake in the MGM Grand in January 2023.

== Features ==
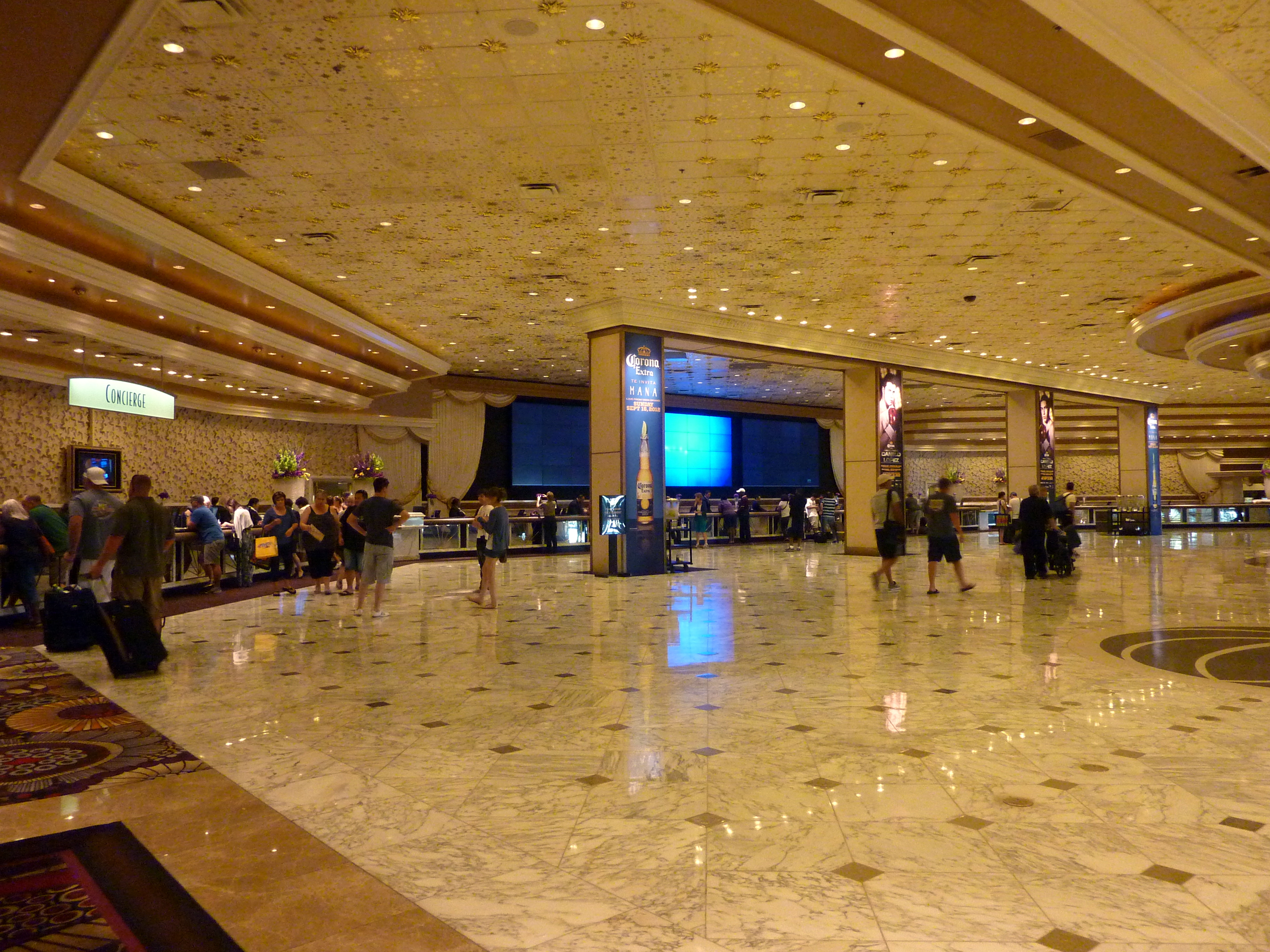
MGM hotel lobby, 2012

Veldon Simpson was the MGM's architect, while the original interior design was handled by Henry Conversano & Associates, and Miller & Jedrziewski Associates.

=== Hotel and casino ===
The MGM hotel towers rise up to 30 stories, while the original western wing remains a 14-story structure. The MGM originally opened with 5,005 rooms; by room count, this made it the largest hotel in the world, beating the Rossiya Hotel in Russia. It remains the largest single-building hotel in the U.S. The 2025 renovation combined some smaller rooms to create an additional 111 suites, for a total of 752, while reducing the overall room count to 4,762.

Upon opening, the resort also included the world's largest casino, measuring 171,500 sq ft (15,930 m^{2}). It featured 3,500 slot machines and 165 table games. The casino floor was divided into four themed areas, including the Emerald City Casino, themed after the eponymous fictional locale in The Wizard of Oz. This area featured costumed performers and animatronics depicting characters from the film. The entry featured a seven-story dome with a ceiling that switched between day and night; and a 15-minute magic show known as The Wizard's Secret, which incorporated a hydraulic moving floor. Other themed gaming areas included the Hollywood Casino, featuring a Hollywood movie theme; the Monte Carlo Casino, focused on high rollers; and the Sports Casino, which included the property's sportsbook.

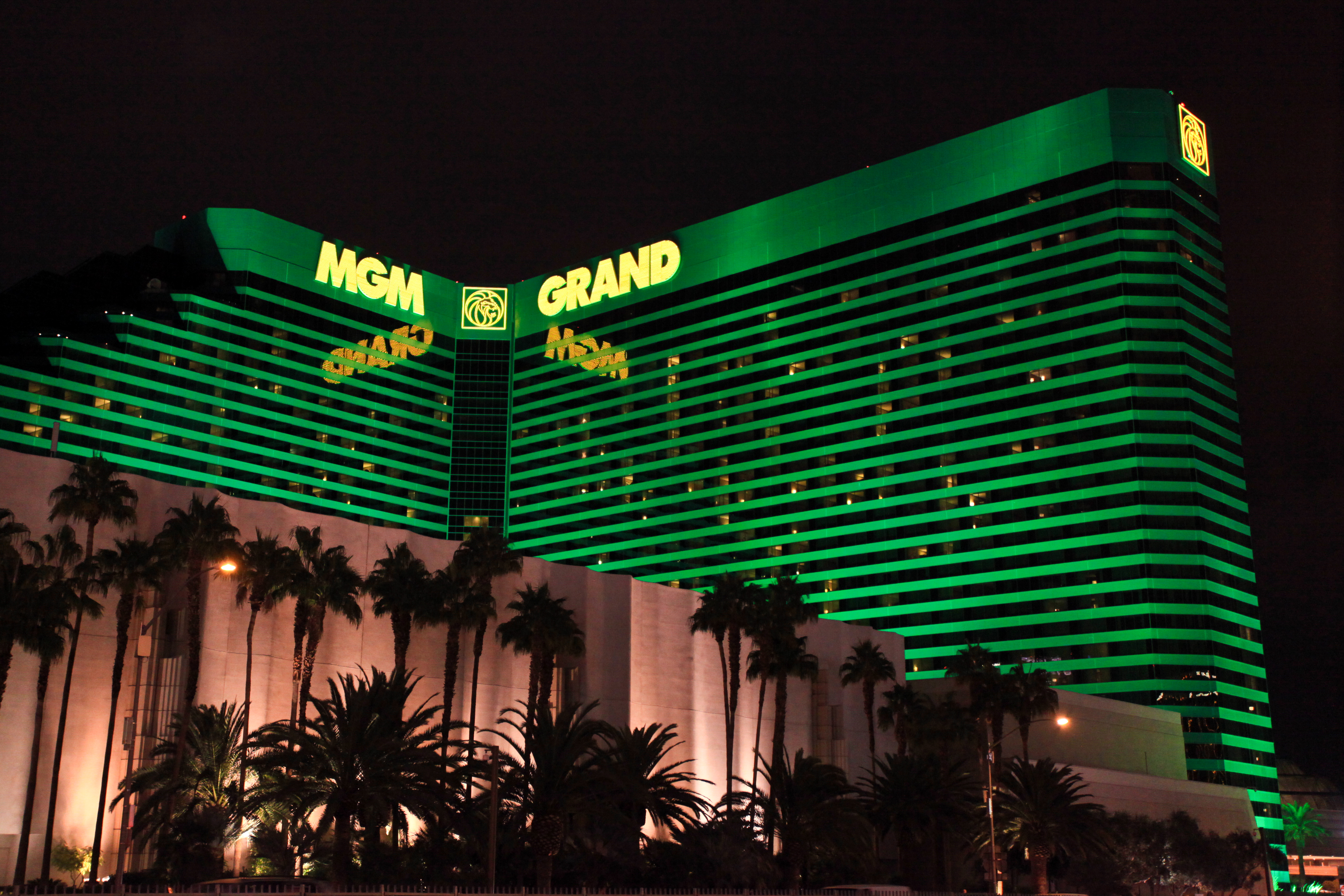
The MGM's green exterior at night

Hotel rooms were also divided into themes, including Casablanca, Hollywood, and southern American. The Wizard of Oz served as the primary hotel theme. The hotel's exterior consists of green glass panels, originally meant to evoke Emerald City. Blair Kamin, architecture critic for the Chicago Tribune, considered the movie and Wizard of Oz themes poorly integrated, and wrote that the resort exterior "resembles a bland suburban office building with a cartoonish lion's face stuck on the front." Kamin also was critical of the property's size, calling it "so overwhelming and, occasionally, so confusing, that they hand out a map of the hotel-casino at the front door."

The casino opened with 50 Lion's Share slot machines, offering a jackpot of more than $2 million. Only one of the machines remained after several years, gaining a cult following among gamblers. It was the most popular slot machine at the casino. A New Hampshire couple eventually won the jackpot in 2014, after which the machine was retired.

In 2000, the hotel launched a satellite registration and reservations desk at McCarran International Airport. It was the first Las Vegas resort, along with New York-New York across the street, to offer such a feature.

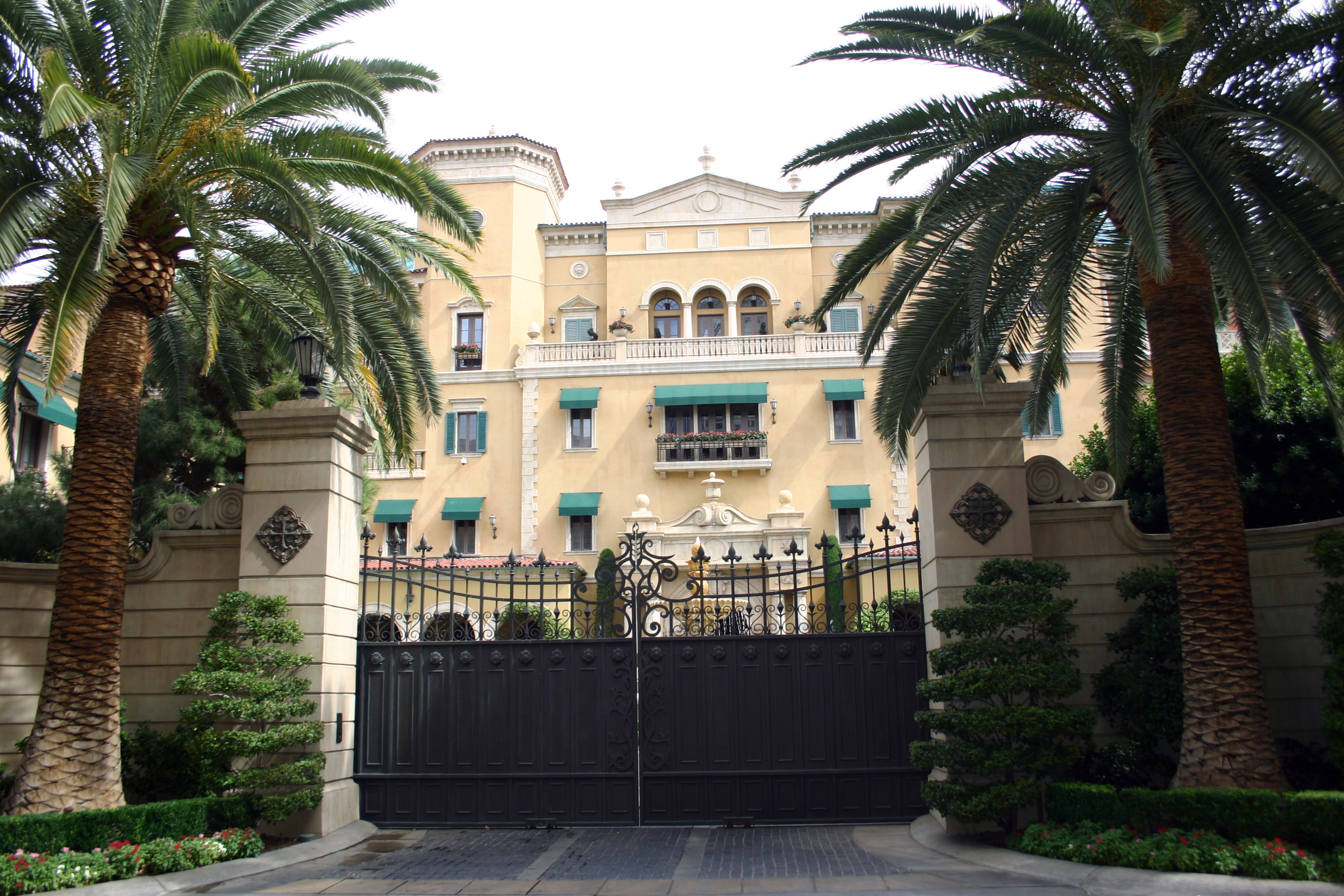
Exterior of the Mansion

The Mansion, a secluded area of private suites and villas reserved for high rollers, opened in May 1999. It was inspired by Tuscany architecture. The Mansion's villas and dining were opened to the public two years later.

In 2001, the MGM Grand led an effort to legalize private casinos, which are closed off to the general public. The Nevada Legislature agreed to change state law, allowing the operation of private gaming salons for players with at least $500,000 to spend and willing to bet $500 minimums. In August 2002, the MGM Grand became the first Nevada casino to offer a private gaming salon. However, demand for such a feature turned out to be extremely low.

In 2005, the hotel unveiled its Skylofts at MGM Grand, consisting of 51 units occupying the top two floors. The units were designed by Tony Chi to resemble urban apartments and are meant for wealthy guests. A trio of condo hotel towers, known as The Signature at MGM Grand, began opening in 2006.

The casino has a poker room with 13 tables and hosts both cash games and tournaments.

=== Facade ===
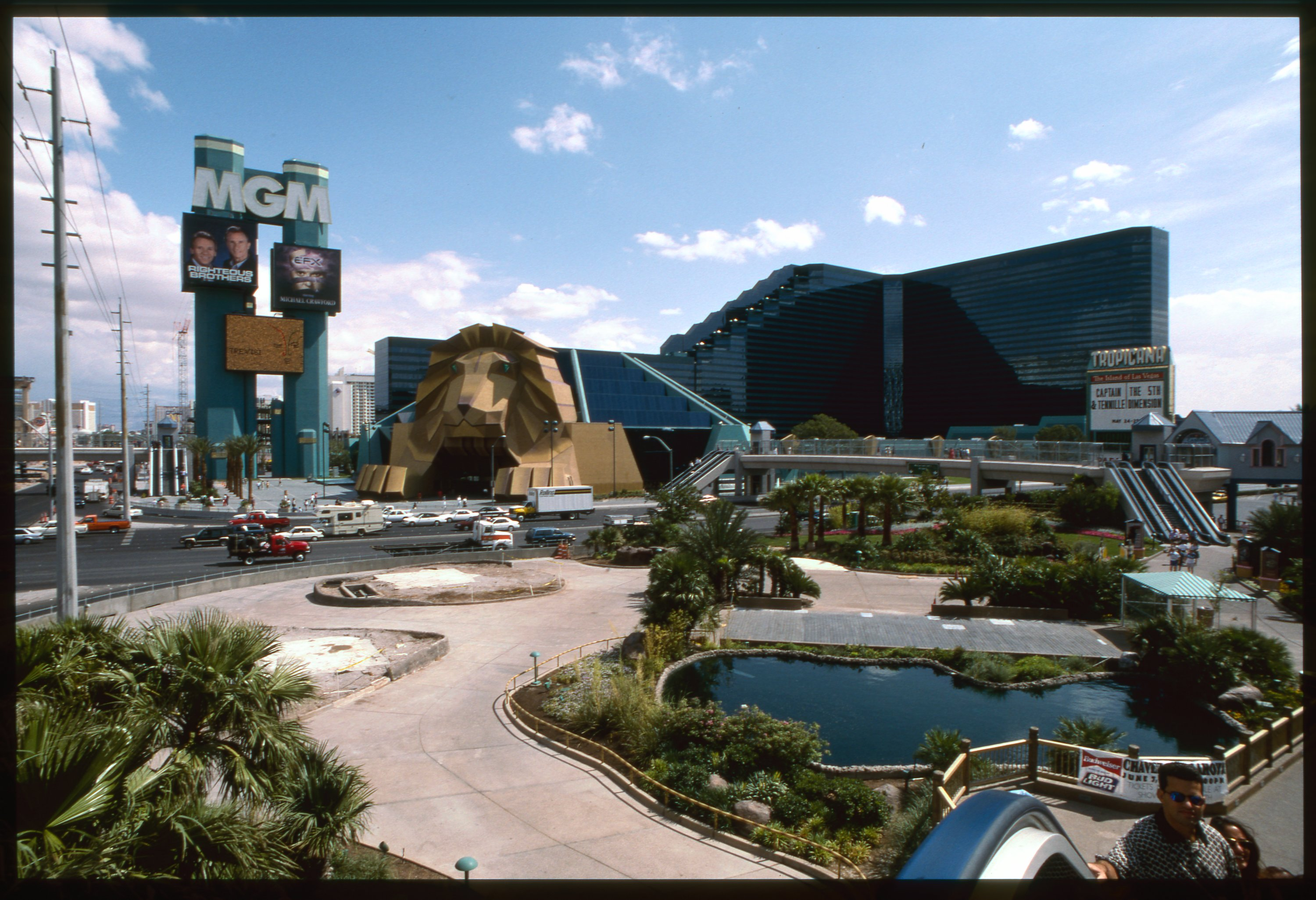
The original MGM lion entrance in 1996, seen from the Tropicana resort across the street.

The MGM's original facade along the Strip consisted of a giant lion head, made of fiberglass and blocky in appearance, with visitors entering beneath the lion's closed mouth. Measuring 88 feet in height, the lion was a cartoon-like version of MGM's logo, Leo the Lion. Because of its design, Asian gamblers reportedly perceived the facade as if they were entering through the lion's mouth, which is considered bad luck in Chinese culture. As a result, plans were announced in May 1996 to remove the lion entrance. Demolition began on May 13, 1997, and was expected to take two weeks, with a new $40 million facade taking its place.

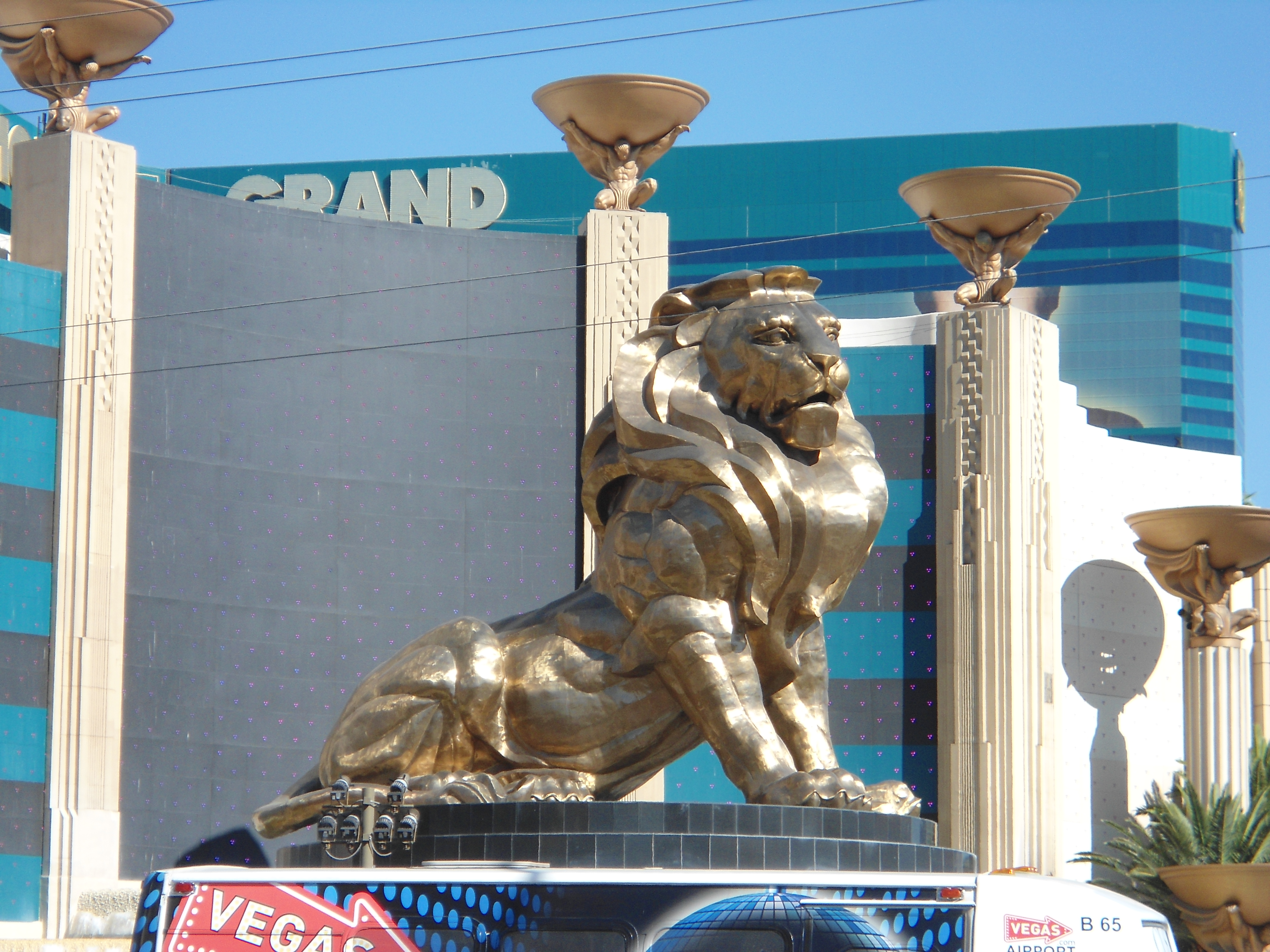
Newer lion facade

The new facade consists of a lion statue. It weighs 50 tons, and at 45 feet (14 m) tall, on a 25-foot pedestal, is the largest bronze statue in the U.S. It was designed by Snellen Johnson, and created through his Arizona company American Art. Johnson initially worked with a team of 11 people to sculpt a foam mold, which would be used to create the statue.

In November 1997, the property installed 18 promotional and entertainment LED screens, including 15 outside the resort. Installation of the statue was underway a month later, with the addition of a 5,000-pound paw. The new facade also includes 11 statues of winged Atlas-like men holding 16-foot diameter bowls. The statues were made of bronze-finished fiberglass and accompany the lion statue, along with water fountains and the LED screens. Work on the statue and accompanying fountains was expected to conclude in February 1998.

=== Restaurants and nightlife ===
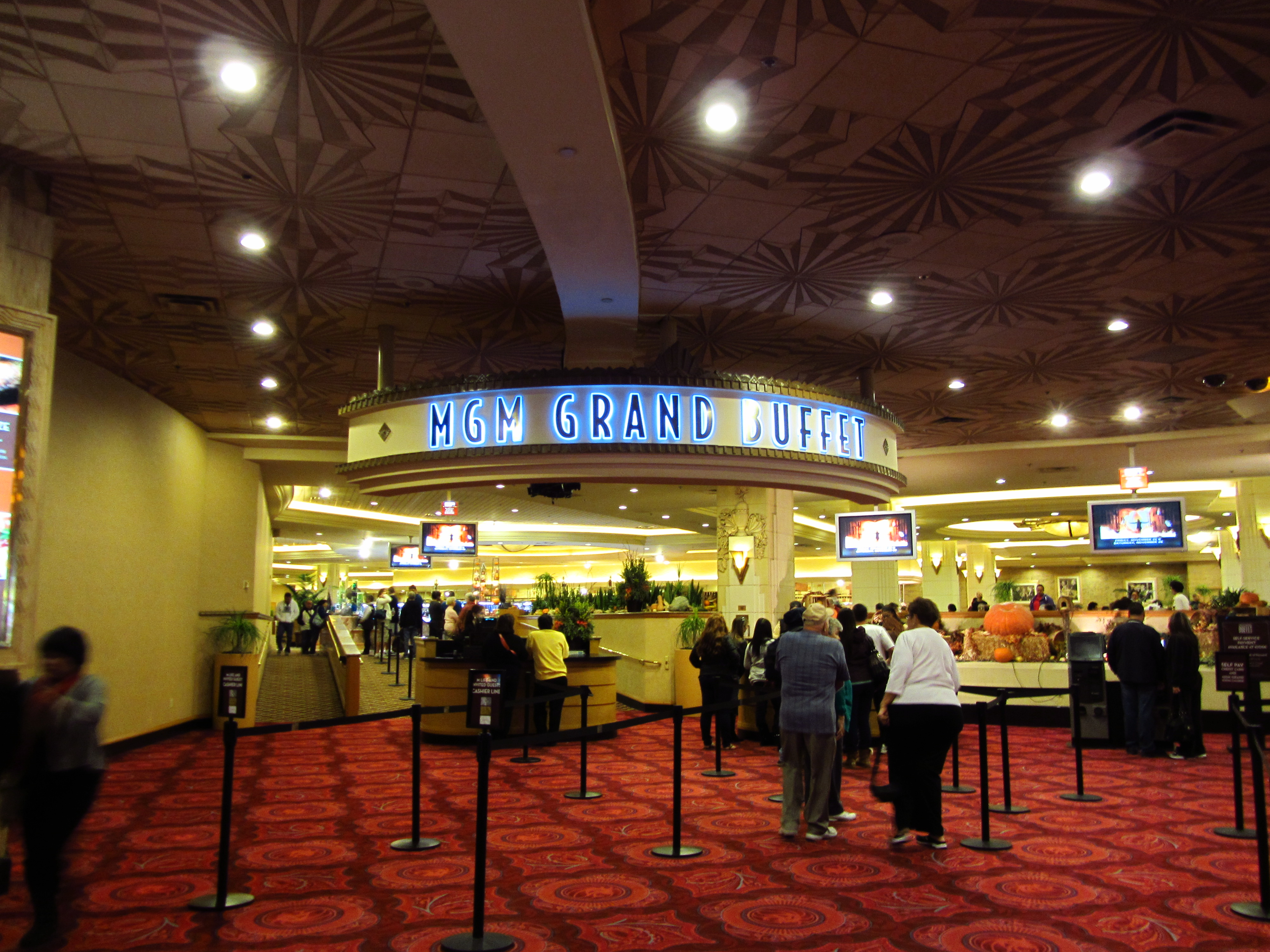
MGM Grand Buffet in 2011

The MGM Grand opened with eight restaurants, including the 1,000-seat Oz Buffet, the 750-seat movie-themed Studio Cafe, and a restaurant by chef Wolfgang Puck. The property also featured a food court with seven additional eateries. Emeril's New Orleans Fish House opened in 1995, marking the first Las Vegas restaurant for chef Emeril Lagasse. A Rainforest Cafe opened at the resort in 1997, and operated until 2015.

The MGM added several new restaurants in the early 2000s, including Craftsteak by chef Tom Colicchio, and Nob Hill by chef Michael Mina. Also added was a Chinese restaurant known as Pearl, and the Italian restaurant Fiamma Trattoria, the latter by chefs Michael White and Anthony Amoroso. Pearl was replaced in 2018 by China Tang, which closed two years later. Fiamma was replaced by a new Italian restaurant, Ambra, in 2019.

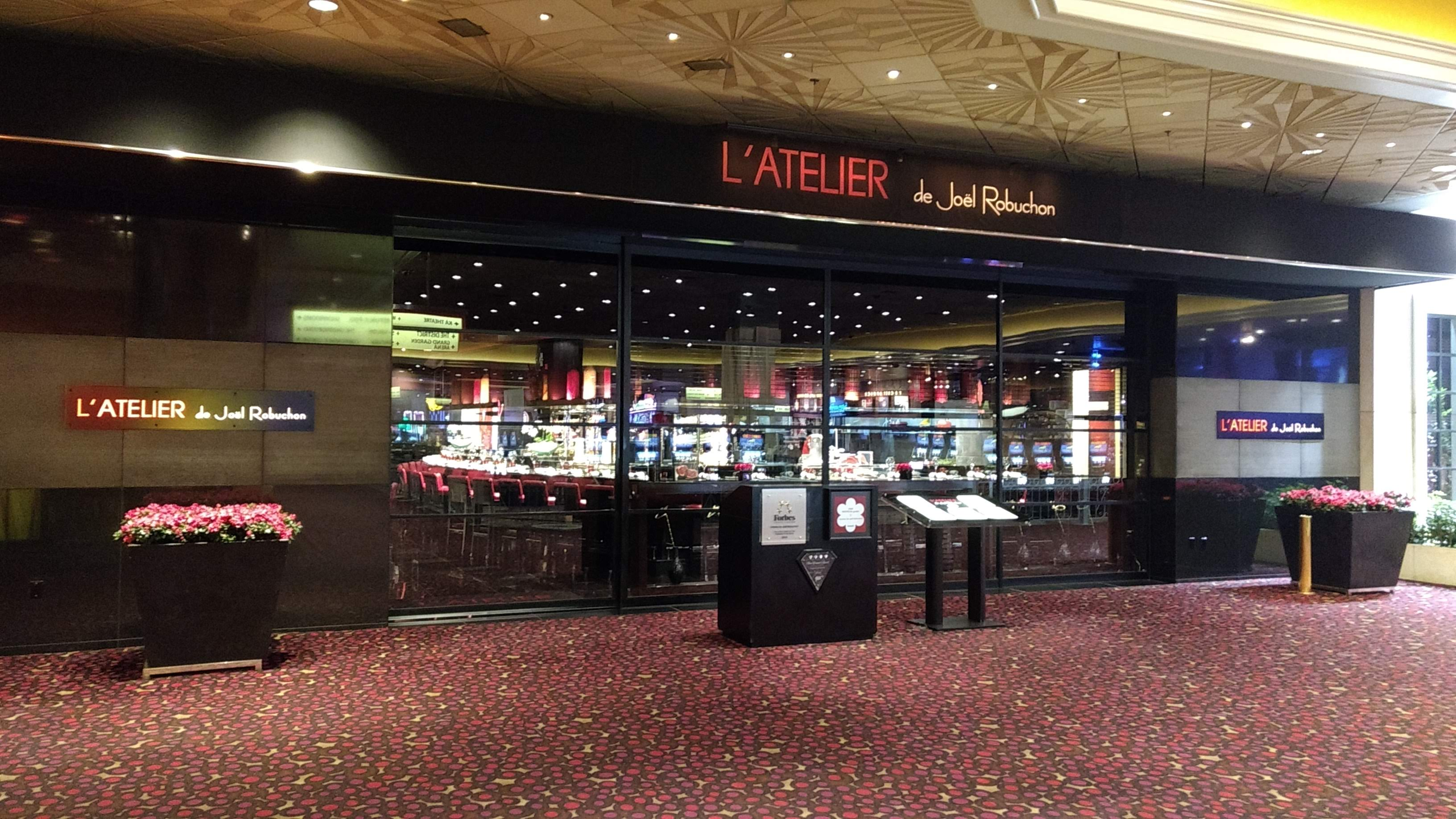
L'Atelier de Joël Robuchon

Chef Joël Robuchon opened two restaurants at the Mansion in 2005, including L'Atelier de Joël Robuchon and the eponymous Joël Robuchon. The latter has won numerous accolades from Mobil Travel Guide and American Automobile Association.

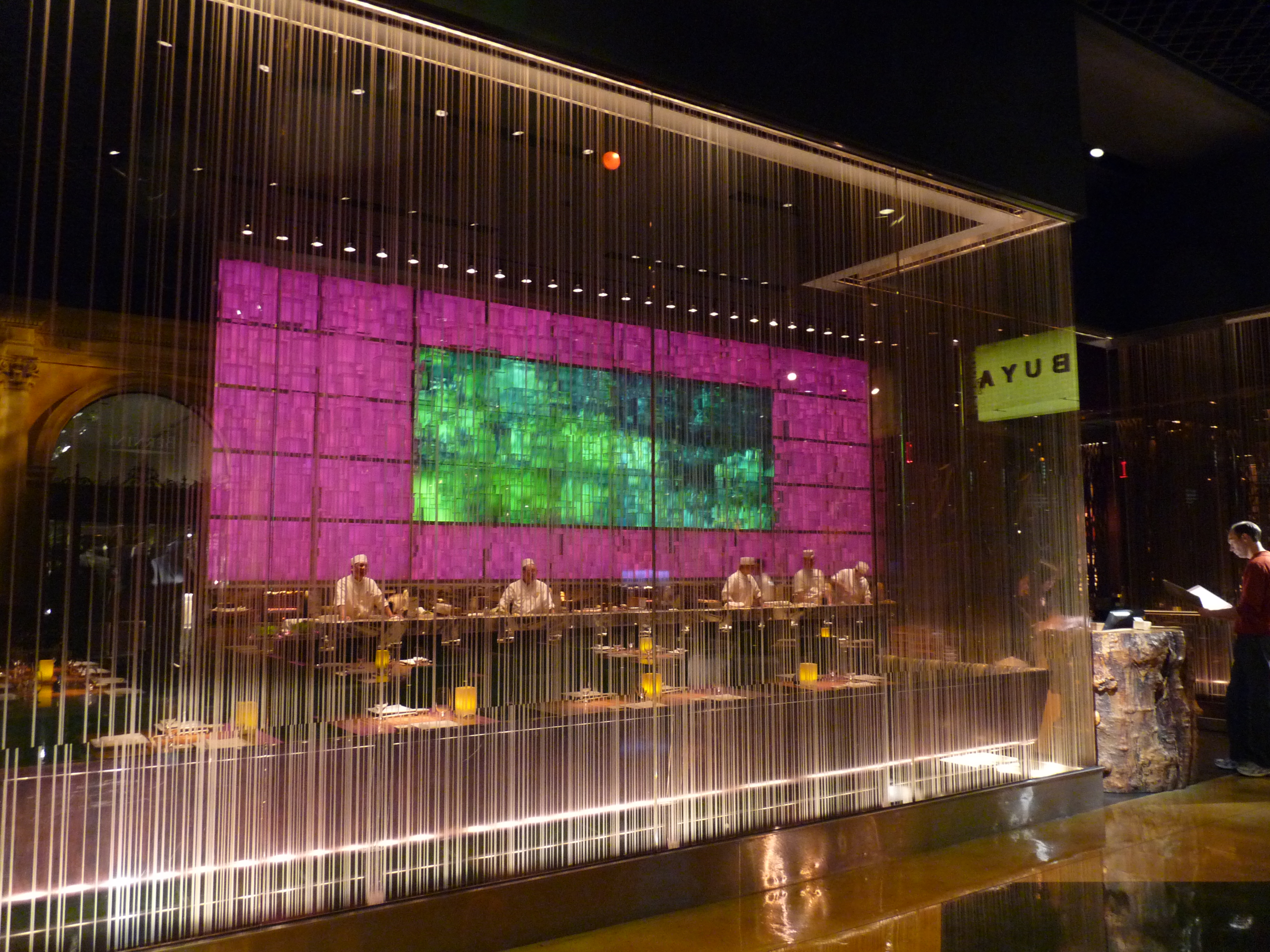
Shibuya in 2009

Shibuya, opened in 2004, was the resort's Japanese restaurant. It was replaced when chef Masaharu Morimoto made his Las Vegas debut with Morimoto, a Japanese restaurant opened in 2016. Three years later, Mina and chef Ayesha Curry partnered to open International Smoke, featuring cuisine from around the world, including barbecue. It was the fourth International Smoke location to open since the chain's inception earlier that year.

In 2022, the Jonas Brothers and their family members opened Nellie's Southern Kitchen, named after a great-grandmother. It was the second location to open, following a North Carolina debut six years earlier. Luchini, an Italian restaurant, debuted in 2023. It is accompanied by Chez Bippy, named after a fictional bar featured in the 1993 film A Bronx Tale.

During the 1990s, the casino included the Betty Boop Bar, which featured an animatronic of comedian Foster Brooks that recreated his drunken humor. It was removed after a few years due to poor aging. A nightclub, Studio 54, opened at the MGM in December 1997. It featured memorabilia from the original Studio 54 in New York. The Las Vegas location closed in February 2012, and much of its interior decor sat in an MGM parking garage for the next three years, before being purchased by two local collectors. The former Studio 54 space was replaced by a nightclub and restaurant known as Hakkasan, which opened in April 2013. Another nightclub, Tabu Ultra Lounge, opened in 2003, and had capacity for 340 people. It closed in 2013, and was replaced by a whiskey bar. Netflix began construction for a one-year Netflix Bites residency based on its 2023 pop-up restaurant of the same name, which featured chefs from the broadcaster's streaming line-up, such as Dominique Crenn, Ming Tsai, and Andrew Zimmern. The new venue is slated to open in 2025.

=== Other features ===
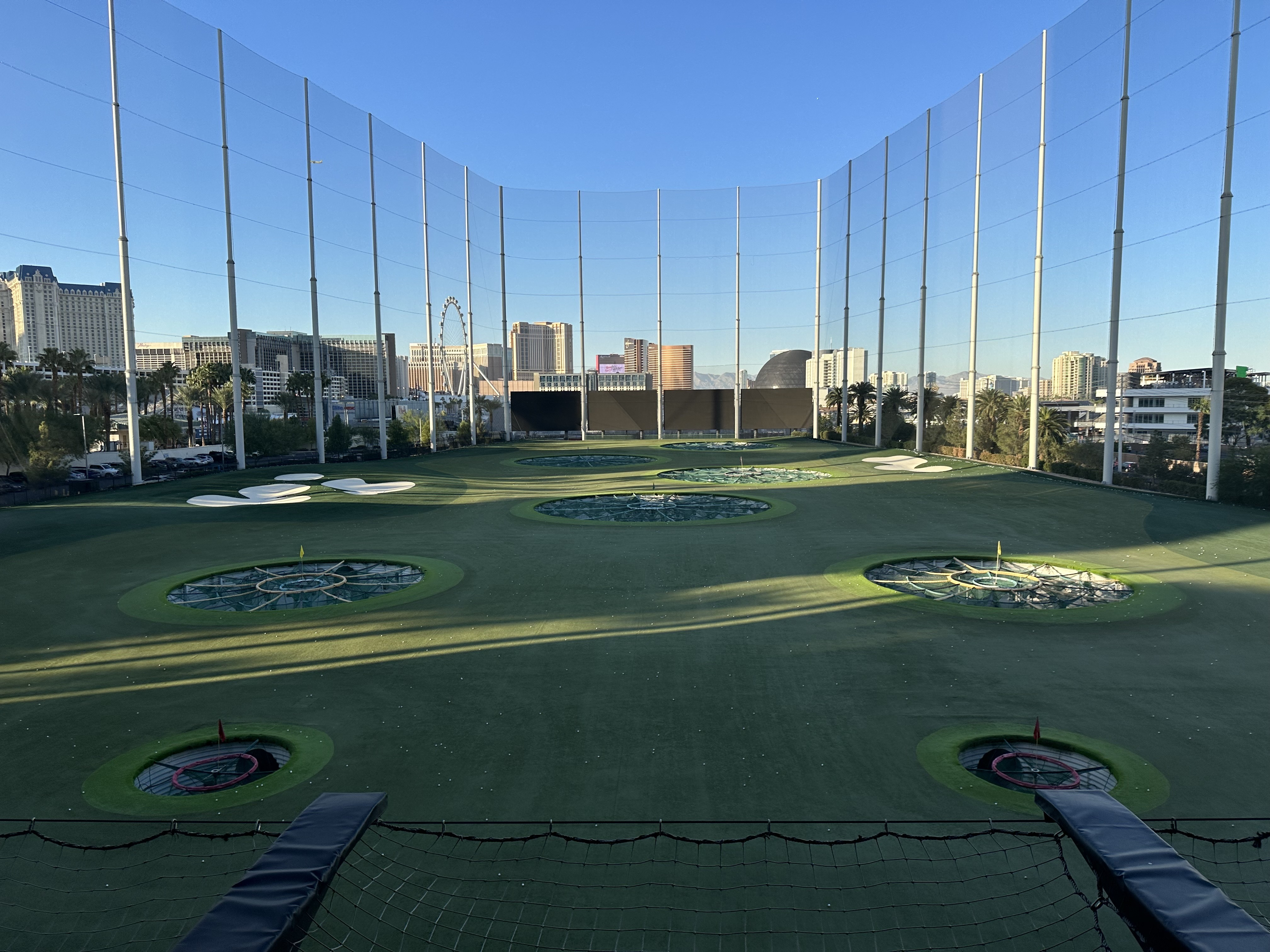
MGM's Topgolf attraction

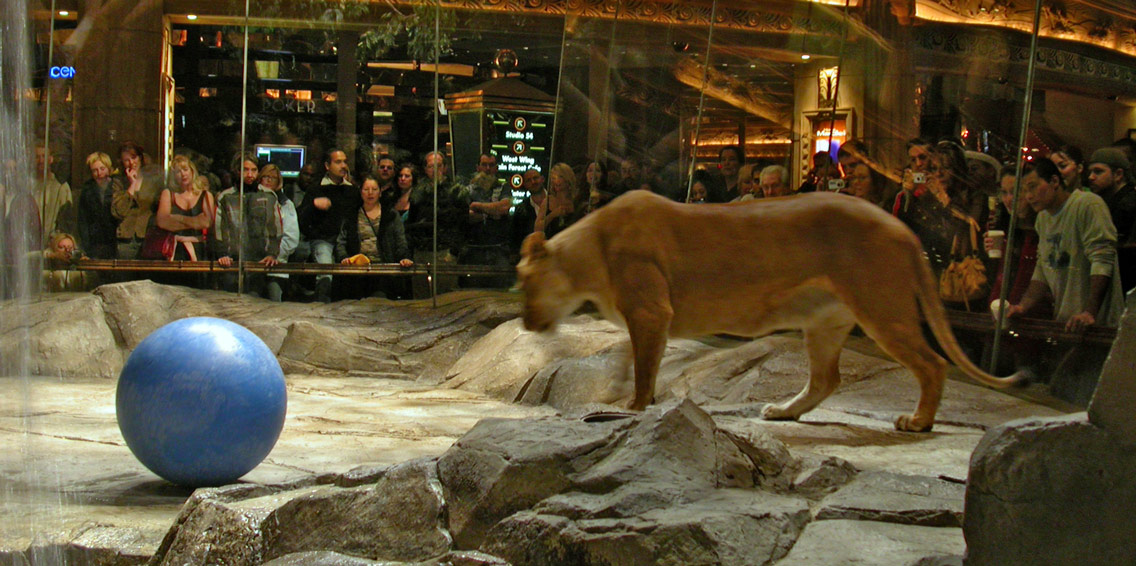
The MGM's lion habitat in 2006

Upon opening, the MGM included family friendly attractions such as the Oz Arcade, offering more than 150 games; and the 30,000 sq ft (2,800 m^{2}) Oz Midway, with 30 midway games. The theme park, MGM Grand Adventures, opened on 33 acres (13 ha) located northeast of the resort. It closed to the public in 2000, and was briefly used thereafter for corporate and special events. Some of the former theme park land would later be taken over by the Signature towers. Topgolf opened one of its driving ranges on the remaining acreage on May 19, 2016.

The MGM opened a 380,000 sq ft (35,000 m^{2}) conference center in April 1998. The facility, as well as a pool and spa, were constructed on 15 acres of land previously occupied by a portion of the theme park and a parking lot. An expansion of the conference center began in June 2017, and was opened in January 2019. It was built at a cost of $130 million.

An indoor lion habitat opened at the resort as a free attraction on July 1, 1999. The $9 million enclosure measured 5,000 sq ft (460 m^{2}) and featured several glass walls for viewing, as well as a see-through tunnel. The habitat consisted of more than 40 lions who were rotated out on a daily basis for viewing. The lions were owned by animal trainer Keith Evans and lived at his ranch outside Las Vegas. As part of ongoing renovation work, the habitat closed on January 31, 2012. It was replaced by a sports bar.

The 1996–1998 renovation added a retail and restaurant area known as the Studio Walk, featuring a Hollywood sound stage theme. In 2013, the Studio Walk was rebranded as The District. A separate, underground retail area was known originally as the Starlane Mall, before being renamed MGM Underground in 2012.

In April 2001, CBS opened Television City, a television research facility located in the Studio Walk. An exhibit, CSI: The Experience, opened at the Studio Walk in 2009. It was a paid attraction based on the television series CSI: Crime Scene Investigation. Visitors would tour the exhibit, analyzing faux crime scenes and evidence to solve murder cases. The attraction closed in 2020, due to the local effects of the COVID-19 pandemic.

The MGM opened with a 144,000 sq ft (13,400 m^{2}) pool complex. Wet Republic, a popular 54,000 sq ft (5,000 m^{2}) dayclub by Hakkasan, has operated at the pool area since 2008. Level Up, a video game lounge also by Hakkasan, opened in 2016, taking over the former Rainforest Cafe space.

== Live entertainment ==
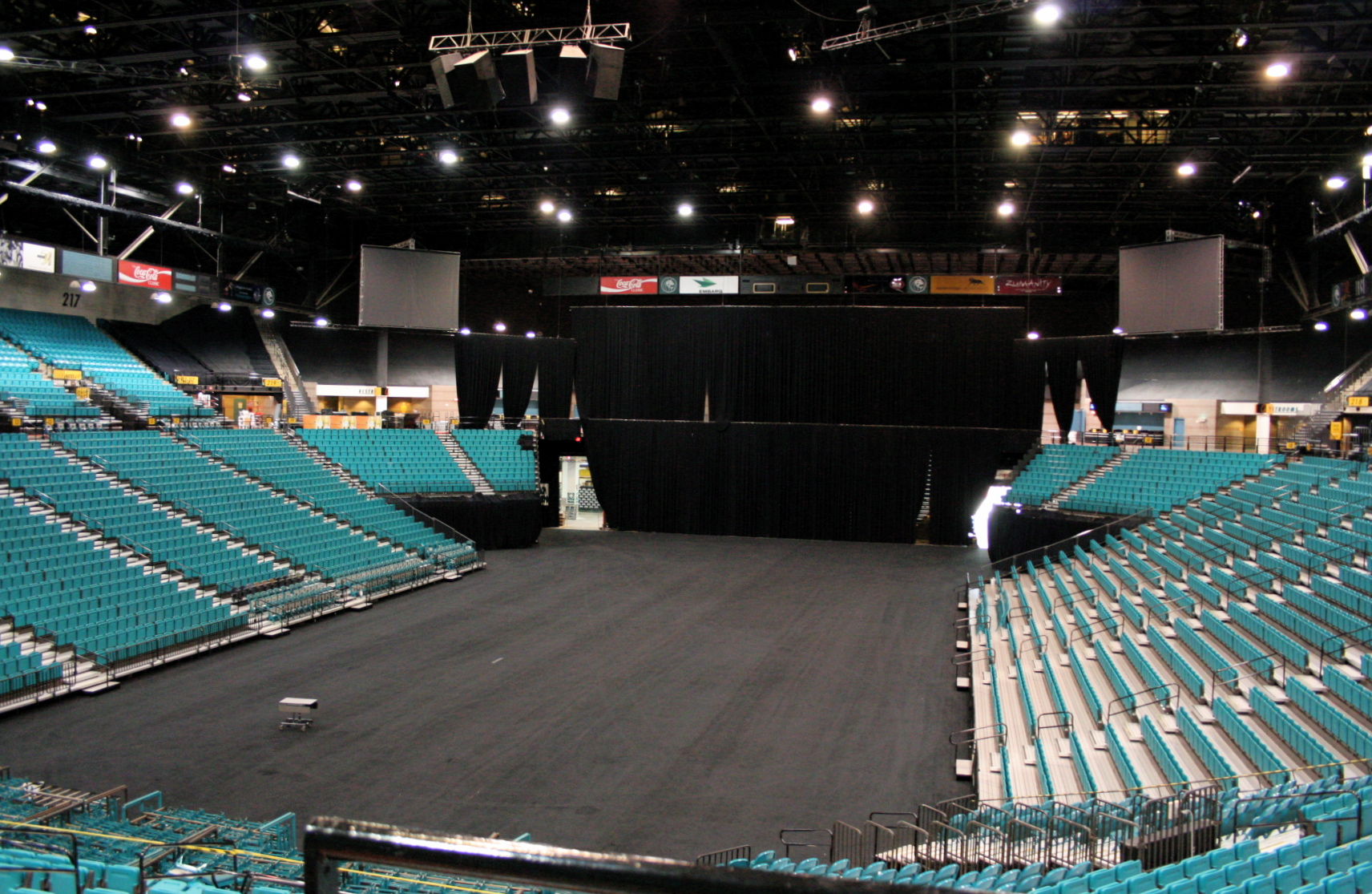
MGM Grand Garden Arena

The resort originally included the 15,200-seat MGM Grand Garden Arena, in addition to the 1,700-seat Grand Theatre and the 630-seat Hollywood Theatre.

A production show, EFX, ran at the resort from 1995 to 2002. It was headlined by several different entertainers during its run, including Michael Crawford, David Cassidy, Tommy Tune, and Rick Springfield.

In 1999, the resort debuted a version of the American game show Wheel of Fortune. Audience members were allowed to participate and potentially win money. The show had ended by 2001. It took place in a 400-seat venue previously home to Catch a Rising Star, a chain of comedy clubs.

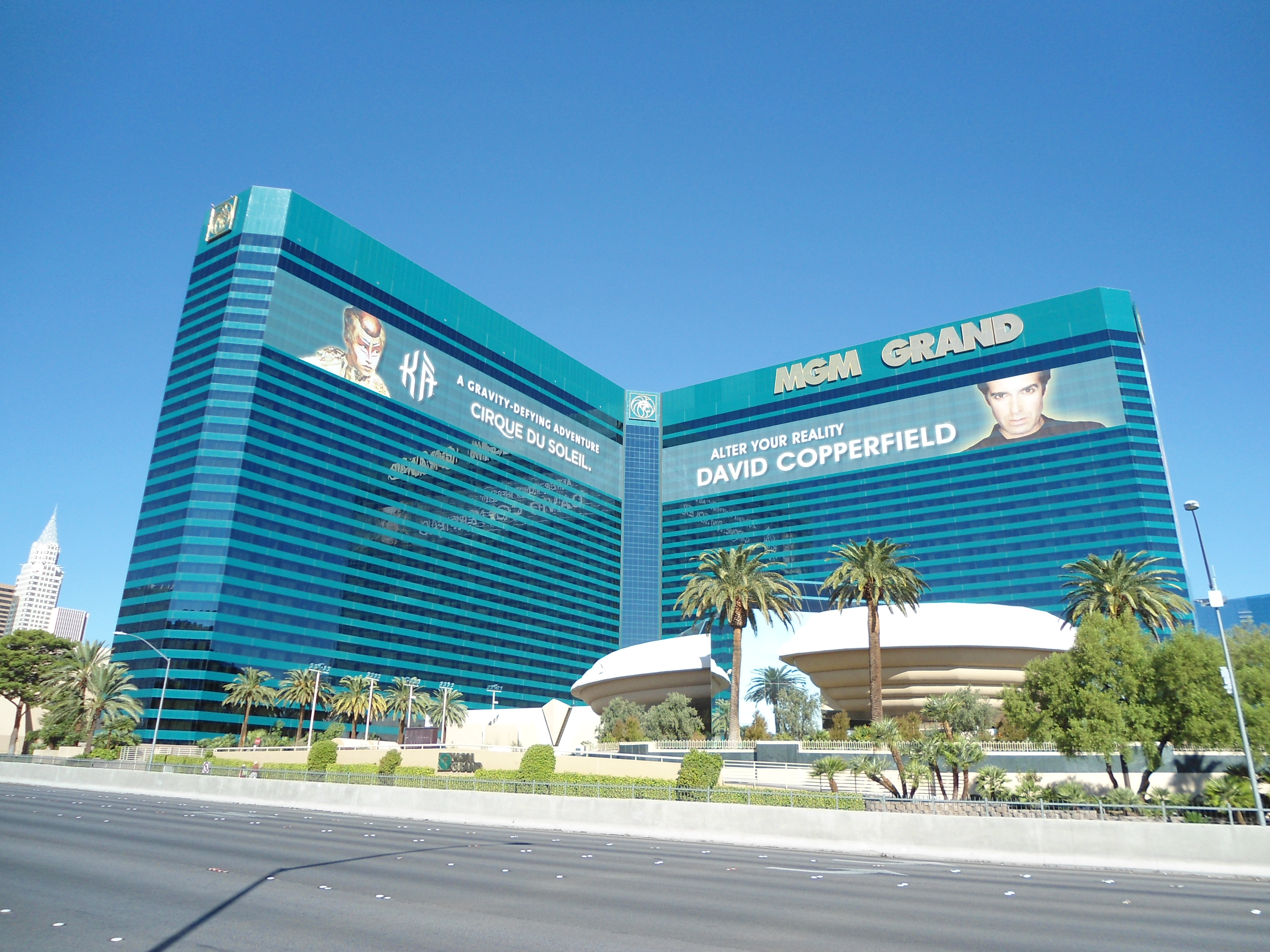
Exterior banners promoting Kà and magician David Copperfield, 2011.

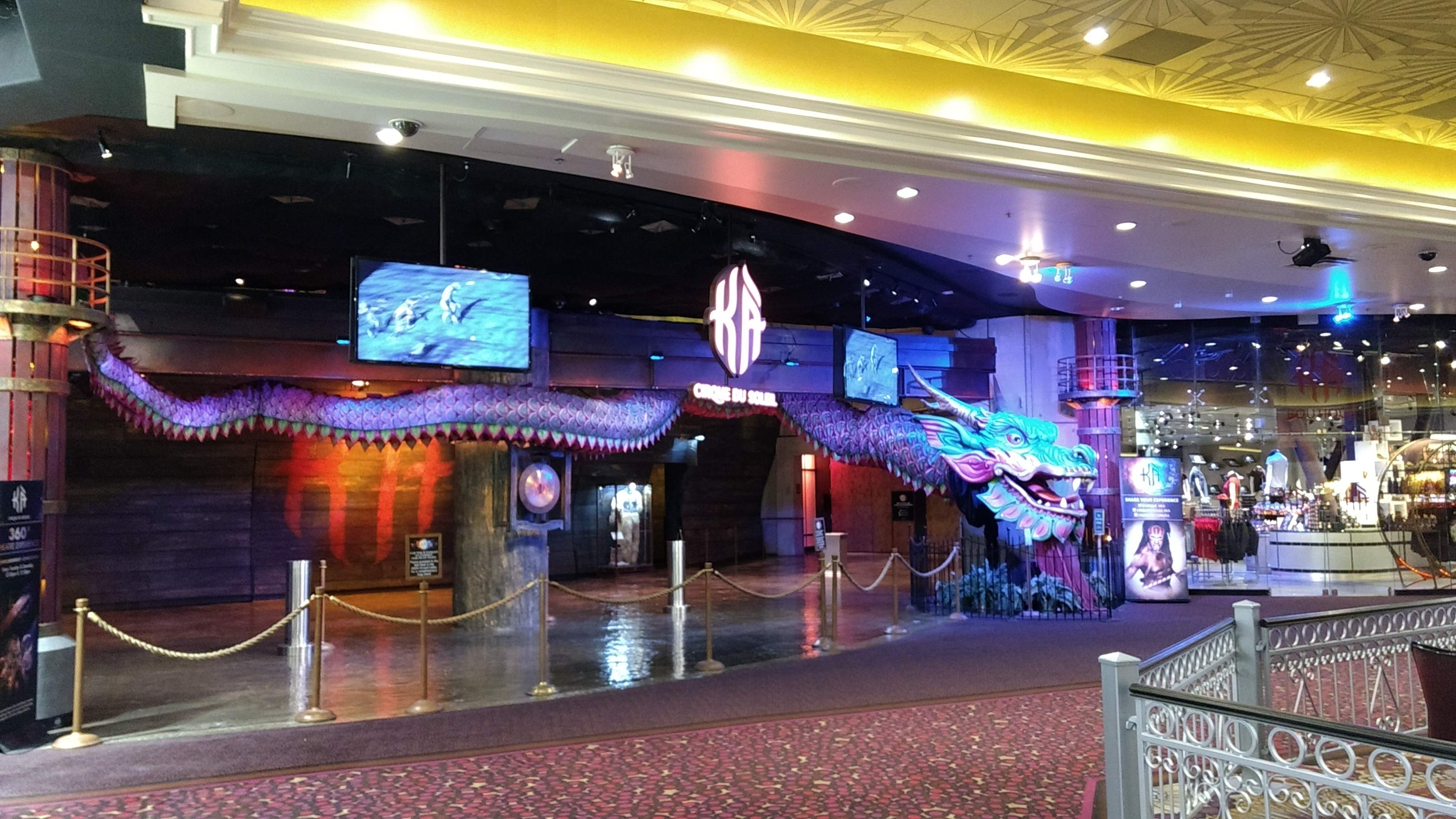
Kà theater entrance

Magician David Copperfield has been a longtime performer at the MGM, entertaining there since 2000. Kà, a show by Cirque du Soleil, has been performed at the resort since 2005. It takes place in a custom-built theater seating nearly 2,000 people.

In 2001, the resort launched La Femme, a topless show that recreated the Parisian cabaret known as Crazy Horse. The producers chose the name La Femme as Las Vegas already had a strip club known as Crazy Horse Too, which filed a lawsuit regarding the name rights. The show eventually took on the Crazy Horse name in 2007, before closing in 2012. A year later, Jeff Beacher opened his Beacher's Madhouse show in the former Crazy Horse venue. The Jabbawockeez dance group opened in the space in 2015, and is contracted to perform there through 2025.

Brad Garrett's Comedy Club opened in March 2012, with seating for 283 people. It was originally located in the MGM Underground area. The club has hosted numerous comedians, including Garrett himself. In 2022, the club moved to a better location at The District, taking over the former China Tang restaurant space. Although the new location sat in a higher-traffic area, seating was reduced to 210.

== In popular culture ==
The MGM Grand has made appearances in several comedy films.

- The resort is featured prominently in The Great White Hype (1996).
- The Wizard of Oz theme is referenced in Swingers (1996); the character Trent picks up a waitress whose friend works as a costumed Dorothy Gale at the MGM.
- The resort also appears near the end of Vegas Vacation (1997), as the casino where the Griswolds win back their money in a game of keno.
- The MGM appears during the finale of Ready to Rumble (2000).
- The MGM also appears as the site of Wayne Newton's show in Vegas Vacation (1997). It is not The Mirage despite popular opinion.
- The MGM is one of three casinos to be robbed by Danny Ocean and his crew in Ocean's Eleven (2001). A staged title unification match between heavyweight boxing champions Lennox Lewis and Wladimir Klitschko is also prominently featured in the film.

The MGM has made television appearances as well.

- The resort is featured in a 2001 episode of CSI: Crime Scene Investigation, titled "Table Stakes".
- It also appears in The Amazing Race 15 (2009) and The Amazing Race 24 (2014).
- In Dominion (2014–15), the MGM serves as the home base of David Whele.

In Stephen King's 1978 novel The Stand, Randall Flagg adopts the deserted MGM Grand as his base of operations.

== See also ==
- List of integrated resorts
