= Mark Scheinberg =

Israeli-Canadian businessman (born 1973)

- מרק שיינטברג
- Born: 1973 (age 52–53); Israel
- Citizenship: Canada
- Occupations: Investor; Entrepreneur; Philanthropist
- Parent: Isai Scheinberg

(Igal) Mark Scheinberg (Hebrew: (איגל) מרק שיינברג; born 1973) is an Israeli-Canadian businessman and investor into real estate and luxury hospitality. He is the co-founder and former co-owner of the online gambling company PokerStars, which was sold in 2014 to Amaya Gaming for US$4.9 billion. Scheinberg is also the founder and principal of the investment firm Mohari Hospitality, which has developed various luxury hotels across the world and owns the majority of Tao Group Hospitality.

== Life and career ==
Mark Scheinberg was born in Israel in 1973, moving to Toronto, Ontario, Canada at the age of 13 with his family. They settled in the town of Richmond Hill in the 1980s.

=== PokerStars ===
In 2001 Scheinberg founded PokerStars with his father Isai Scheinberg, a computer programmer. During his tenure as CEO, PokerStars became the world’s largest online poker business and host to the world’s largest online tournament series, acquiring the Full Tilt Poker brand in 2012. In August 2014, Oldford Group Ltd, the PokerStars parent company, was acquired by the Canadian publicly listed company Amaya Gaming Group for US$4,900,000,000 (equivalent to $6,663,972,449 in 2025). Upon completion of the sale, Scheinberg exited the PokerStars group. As of May 2017, Scheinberg was the richest person on the Isle of Man.

=== Mohari Hospitality ===
Scheinberg started Mohari Hospitality as an investment firm focused on the luxury and hospitality sectors. The firm has investments in the Peninsula Resort in Papagayo, Costa Rica, The Ritz-Carlton Yacht Collection, the Waldorf Astoria Miami, and the Four Seasons Private Residences in Washington, DC. Mohari has hired former Chief Executive Officer of Four Seasons Hotels & Resorts, J. Allen Smith as Managing Partner.

Via Mohari Hospitality, in early 2017 Scheinberg became a major investor in Centro Canalejas Madrid, a real estate project in Madrid, Spain. Mohari purchased a 50% stake in the Centro for €225 million from the Grupo OHL subsidiary OHL Desarrollos and the industrial group Villa Mir, who both also retained stakes. With an opening date set for 2019, the project involves the restoration of seven historic adjacent buildings for residential, hotel and commercial use. With a large amount of retail space, the complex will also house the first Four Seasons hotel in Spain, and create 4,800 positions.

In September 2017, a Canadian subsidiary of Mohari Hospitality acquired the Thompson Toronto hotel in downtown Toronto, Ontario. The "boutique" hotel has 105 rooms, event space, and restaurants and lounges.

In April 2023, Mohari Hospitality acquired a 66.9% stake in Tao Group Hospitality from Madison Square Garden Entertainment for $550 million.

According to Forbes, his net worth is estimated at $5.6 billion as of 2024.

== Personal life ==
Scheinberg is single and lives in the Isle of Man. In March 2020 he and his family founded The Scheinberg Relief Fund, to help tackle the direct impact of COVID-19. With an allocation of $50 million, it supports organisations and initiatives in locations where the family has a business or personal presence.

Scheinberg has a keen interest in conservation and animal welfare. In September 2020, it was announced that The Scheinberg Relief Fund would match every donation to the Wildlife Ranger Challenge, a conservation fundraiser that works with charities like the Save the Rhino Trust.
