= List of steakhouses =

The following is an incomplete list of notable steakhouses.

== Chain restaurant steakhouses ==
=== North America ===
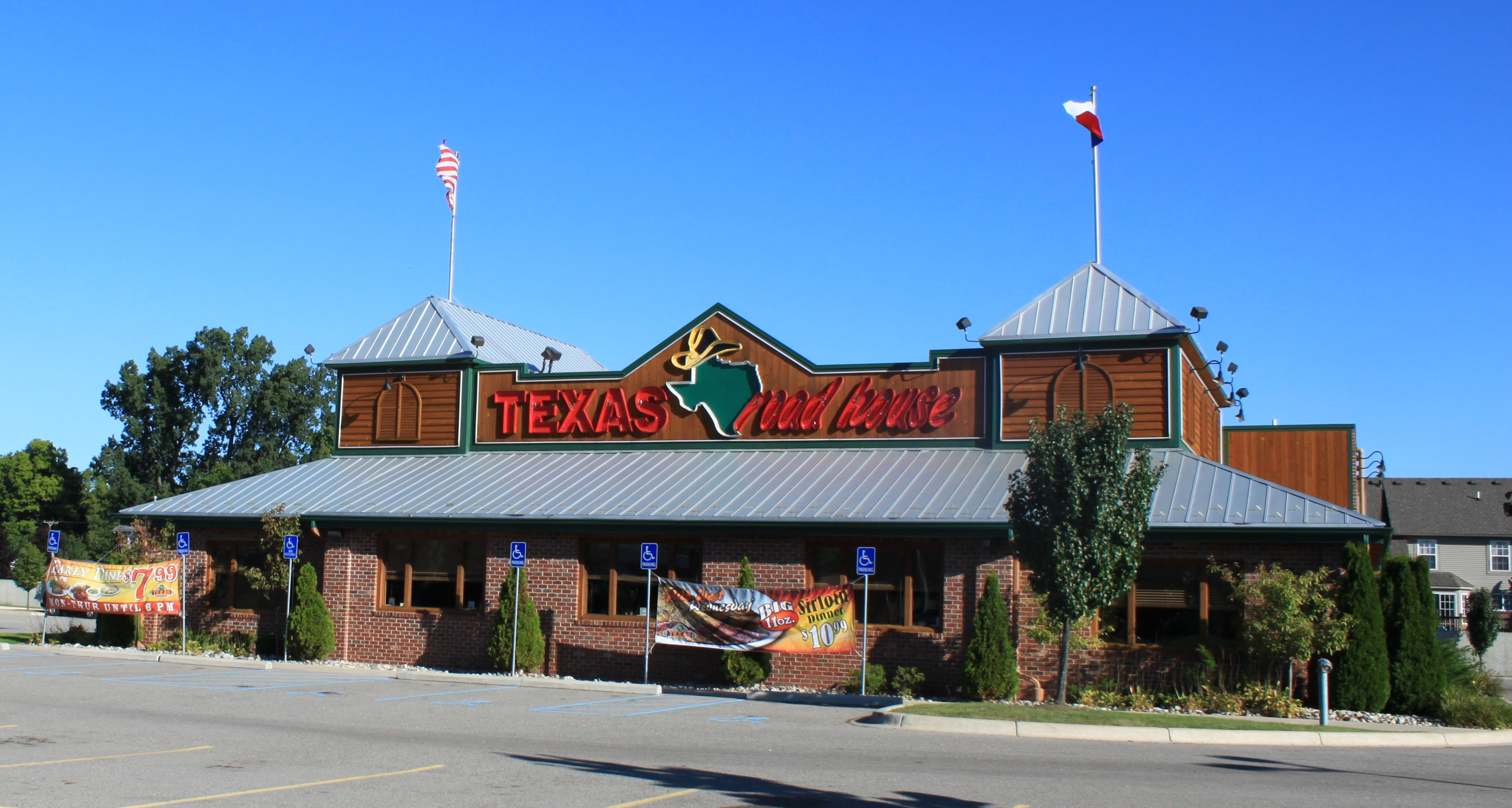
Texas Roadhouse

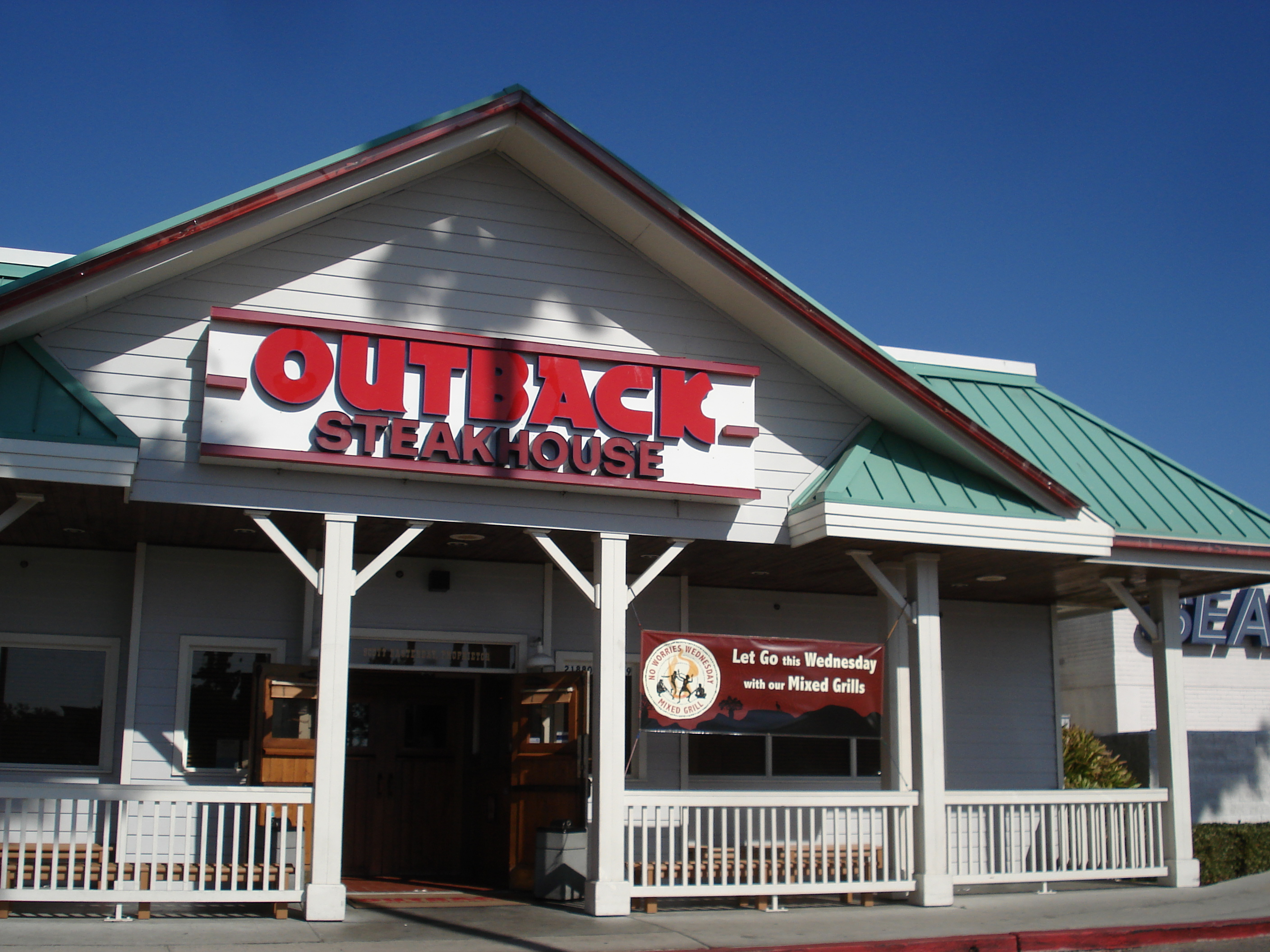
Outback Steakhouse

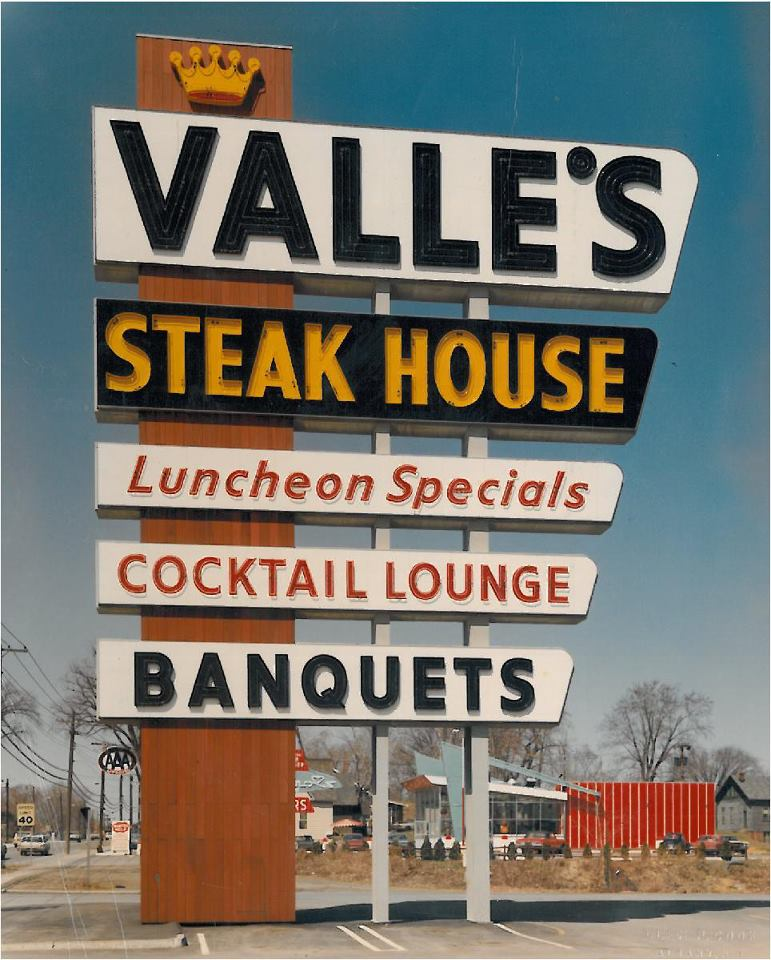
Valle's Steak House's iconic signs once spanned the East Coast from Maine to Florida.

- Black Angus
- Boa Steakhouse
- Bonanza Steakhouse
- Bugaboo Creek Steakhouse (defunct)
- Cameron Mitchell Restaurants
- Capa, Orlando, Florida
- The Capital Grille
- Charlie Brown's Steakhouse
- Claim Jumper
- Cote (restaurant)
- D' La Santa, Seattle
- Del Frisco's Double Eagle Steak House
- Doe's Eat Place
- Elisa, Vancouver
- Fleming's Prime Steakhouse & Wine Bar
- Fogo de Chão
- Gasho of Japan
- Harry Caray's Italian Steakhouse
- Hoss's Steak and Sea House
- Houston's Restaurant
- K-Bob's Steakhouse
- The Keg
- Knife & Spoon, Orlando, Florida
- Lawry's
- Logan's Roadhouse
- Lone Star Steakhouse & Saloon (defunct)
- LongHorn Steakhouse
- Mastro's Restaurants
- Michael Jordan's Steakhouse
- Montana Mike's
- Morton's The Steakhouse
- Mr. Steak
- Niku Steakhouse
- Outback Steakhouse
- The Palm
- Ponderosa Steakhouse
- Quaker Steak & Lube
- Rodizio Grill
- Rustler Steak House
- Ruth's Chris Steak House
- Saltgrass Steak House
- Sirloin Stockade
- Sizzler
- Smith & Wollensky
- Steak and Ale Restaurant
- STK Steakhouse
- Stoney River Legendary Steaks
- Strip House
- Sunny's Steakhouse
- Tahoe Joe's
- Taste of Texas
- Texas de Brazil
- Texas Land and Cattle
- Texas Roadhouse
- Timber Lodge Steakhouse
- Urban Farmer
- Valle's Steak House (defunct)
- Vic & Anthony's Steakhouse
- Victoria Station (defunct)
- Western Sizzlin'
- Wolfgang's Steakhouse
- York Steak House (defunct)

=== Outside North America ===
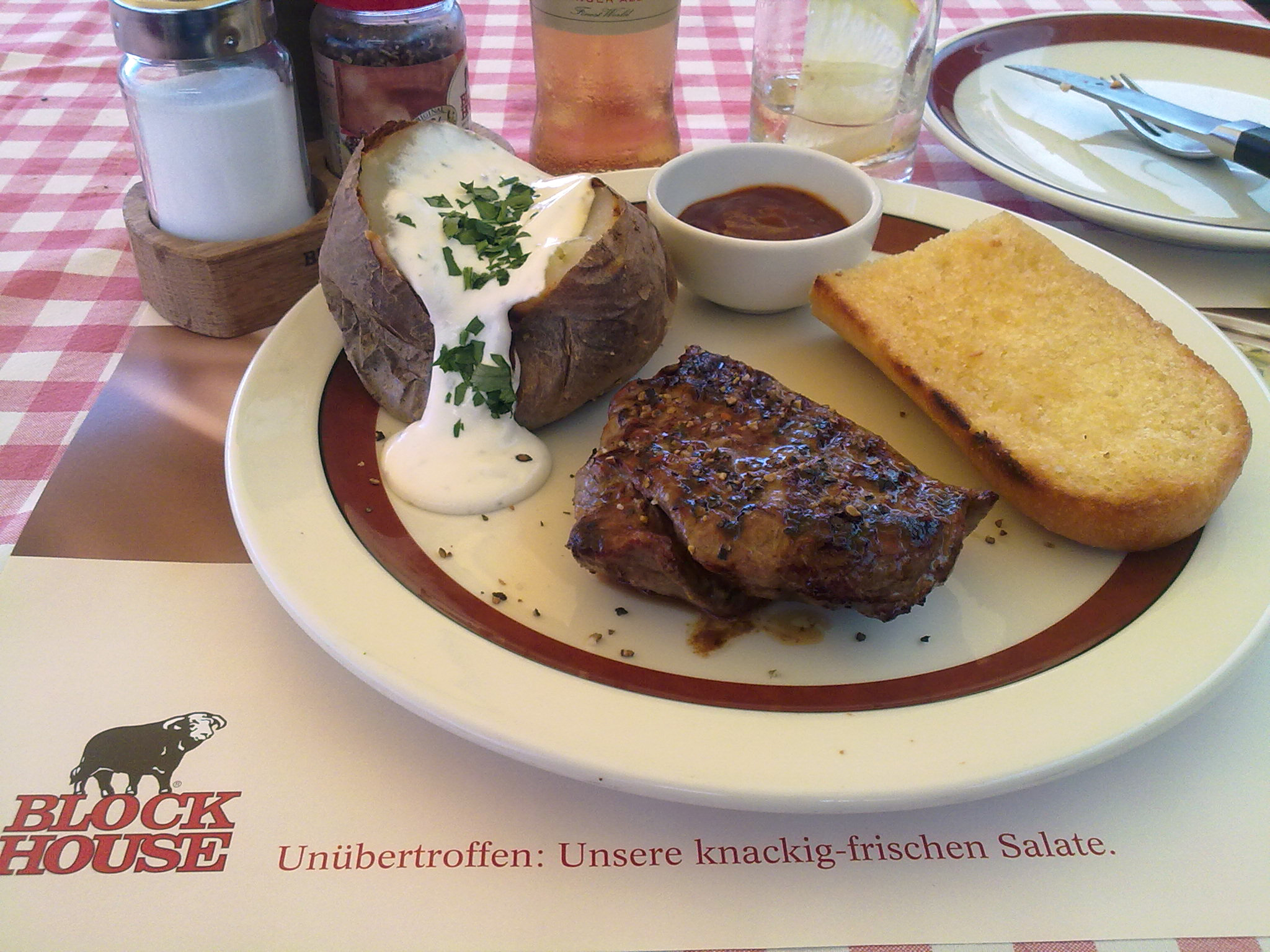
A steak dinner at Block House in Portugal

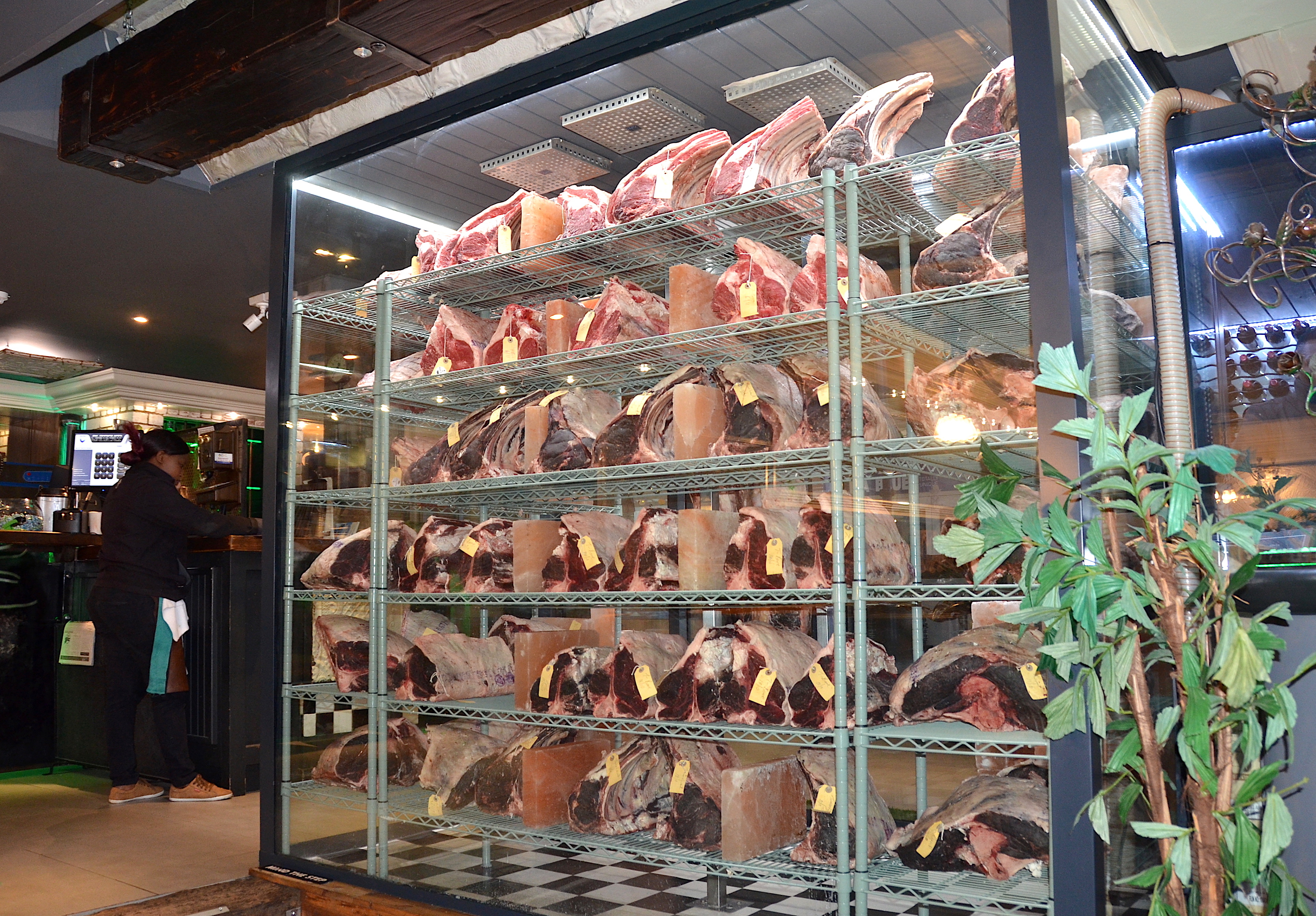
Cooling shelf for choosing steaks at a Steakhouse in Hermanus (South Africa)

- Flat Iron - United Kingdom
- A Hereford Beefstouw - Scandinavia
- Angus Steakhouse - United Kingdom
- Berni Inn (defunct) - United Kingdom
- Block House - Germany
- Buffalo Grill - France
- Hawksmoor (restaurant) - United Kingdom
- Hog's Breath Cafe - Australia
- Kharina Steakhouse - Brazil
- Maredo - Germany
- Mash - Denmark, Germany
- Papagaio - Israel
- Relais de l'Entrecôte - France
- Relais de Venise - London, Bahrain, and New York City
- Ribera Steakhouse - Japan

== Independent restaurants ==
- 555 East - California
- Acropolis Steakhouse - Portland, Oregon
- Angus Barn - North Carolina
- Annie's Paramount Steakhouse - Washington D.C
- Archie's Waeside - Iowa
- Barberian's Steak House - Toronto
- Barclay Prime - Philadelphia
- Bateau (restaurant) Seattle, Washington
- Bear Creek Saloon and Steakhouse - Bear Creek, Montana
- Bern's Steak House - Tampa, Florida
- The Big Texan Steak Ranch - Amarillo, Texas
- Bobcat Bite - Santa Fe, New Mexico
- Bob Taylor's Ranch House, Las Vegas, Nevada
- Buckhorn Exchange - Denver, Colorado
- Cattlemen's Steakhouse - Oklahoma
- Cattlemen's Steak House - Texas
- Clyde's Prime Rib, Portland, Oregon
- Colts Neck Inn - New Jersey
- Cow by Bear - California
- Delmonico's - New York City
- Dickie Brennan's Steakhouse, New Orleans, Louisiana
- Frankie & Johnnie's Steakhouse - New York City
- Gallagher's Steak House - New York City, Las Vegas, and Atlantic City
- Gibsons Italia - Chicago
- Golden Ox - Kansas City, Missouri
- Gorat's - Omaha, Nebraska
- Gwen - Los Angeles
- The Hitching Post - Southern California
- Jake's Grill - Portland, Oregon
- Jeju, Portland, Oregon
- Jess & Jim's Steakhouse - Kansas City, Missouri
- Joule – Seattle
- Keens Steakhouse - New York City
- Laurelhurst Market - Portland, Oregon
- The Malarkey, Portland, Oregon
- Miners and Stockmen's Steakhouse & Spirits - Wyoming
- Moishes Steakhouse - Montreal, Quebec, Canada
- Old Homestead Steakhouse - New York City
- Opal's Steakhouse - Arkansas
- Original Hoffbrau Steakhouse - Austin, Texas
- Ox (Portland, Oregon)
- Perini Ranch Steakhouse - Texas
- Peter Luger Steak House - New York City
- The Pine Club - Dayton, Ohio
- RingSide Steakhouse - Portland, Oregon
- Sayler's Old Country Kitchen, Portland, Oregon
- Sparks Steak House - New York City
- St. Elmo Steak House - Indianapolis, Indiana
- SW Steakhouse, Las Vegas, Nevada
- Taylor's Steakhouse - Los Angeles
- Trabuco Oaks Steakhouse - California
- The Willo Steakhouse - California

=== Defunct Steakhouses ===
- Brasserie Les Halles, New York City
- The Cattleman, New York City
- Christ Cella, New York City
- Country Bill's, Oregon
- Hilltop Steak House, Massachusetts
- Pearl Tavern, Portland, Oregon
- Porter House New York, New York City
- WCW Nitro Grill, Las Vegas, Nevada
