= Pearl Tavern =

Defunct restaurant in Portland, Oregon, U.S.

- 2022 photograph of Backwoods Brewing Company, which operates in the building that previously housed Pearl Tavern
- Interactive map of Pearl Tavern

Restaurant information
- Established: December 2016
- Closed: June 5, 2018
- Owners: Joey Harrington; Kurt Huffman; Ryan Magarian
- Head chef: Roscoe Roberson (2016–2017); Thomas Boyce (2017)
- Food type: American
- Location: 231 Northwest 11th Avenue, Portland, Multnomah, Oregon, 97209, United States
- Coordinates: 45.5250°N 122.6823°W

Pearl Tavern was a sports bar and restaurant in Portland, Oregon's Pearl District, in the United States. The restaurant was started by former American football player Joey Harrington, bartender Ryan Magarian, and ChefStable restaurateur Kurt Huffman in December 2016. Intended to be more casual than a steakhouse, the family-friendly Pearl Tavern served various cuts of steak, fried chicken, fish, and risotto, as well as bar snacks and other options for brunch and happy hour. The interior had dark leather booths and multiple widescreen television for sports viewing, and the servers wore plaid. Three percent of profits benefited Harrington's non-profit organization.

Pearl Tavern's rib steak for two was one of Portland's most expensive menu steaks. Thomas Boyce replaced Roscoe Roberson as executive chef in mid 2017. The restaurant's critical reception was mixed, and it closed in June 2018.

== Description ==
Pearl Tavern was an upscale sports bar and restaurant in northwest Portland's Pearl District, operating from a building which formerly housed The Parish. Intended to be more casual than a steakhouse, the interior featured "stately" dark green walls, wood floors, a long semi-circular bar and dark leather booths inherited from The Parish, and five widescreen televisions above the bar, used mostly for sports but with audio during "big games" only. Lighting was dimmed throughout, and servers were required to wear plaid prints.

In 2017, Karen Brooks of Portland Monthly described the restaurant as "a manly sports bar-meets-steak-house-y tavern that never got off the ground", and the Portland Mercury's Andrea Damewood called Pearl Tavern a sports bar, a steakhouse, and "a man cave for those who drink Bulleit and not Bud". The Oregonian's Michael Russell described the restaurant as a "low-key Pearl District steakhouse".

=== Menu ===
The family-friendly restaurant served "high-end bar food", including seven cuts of steak with seven sauces such as béarnaise and chimichurri, fish, various sides such as bacon-wrapped baked potatoes and lobster bisque, appetizers, and salads. Cuts included flank, rib, and strip steak. Fried chicken, cornmeal-crusted trout, and winter squash risotto were also available.

Bar snacks included avocado toast, fried cheese curds, onion rings, pigs in a blanket with Olympia Provisions sausage, and spiced toffee nuts. Brunch options included Dutch baby pancakes and "yeasted" waffles. The drink menu included craft beer, wine, and fine spirits. Bottle service was also available. For happy hour, Pearl Tavern offered a cheeseburger, chicken wings, macaroni and cheese, and drink specials.

== History ==
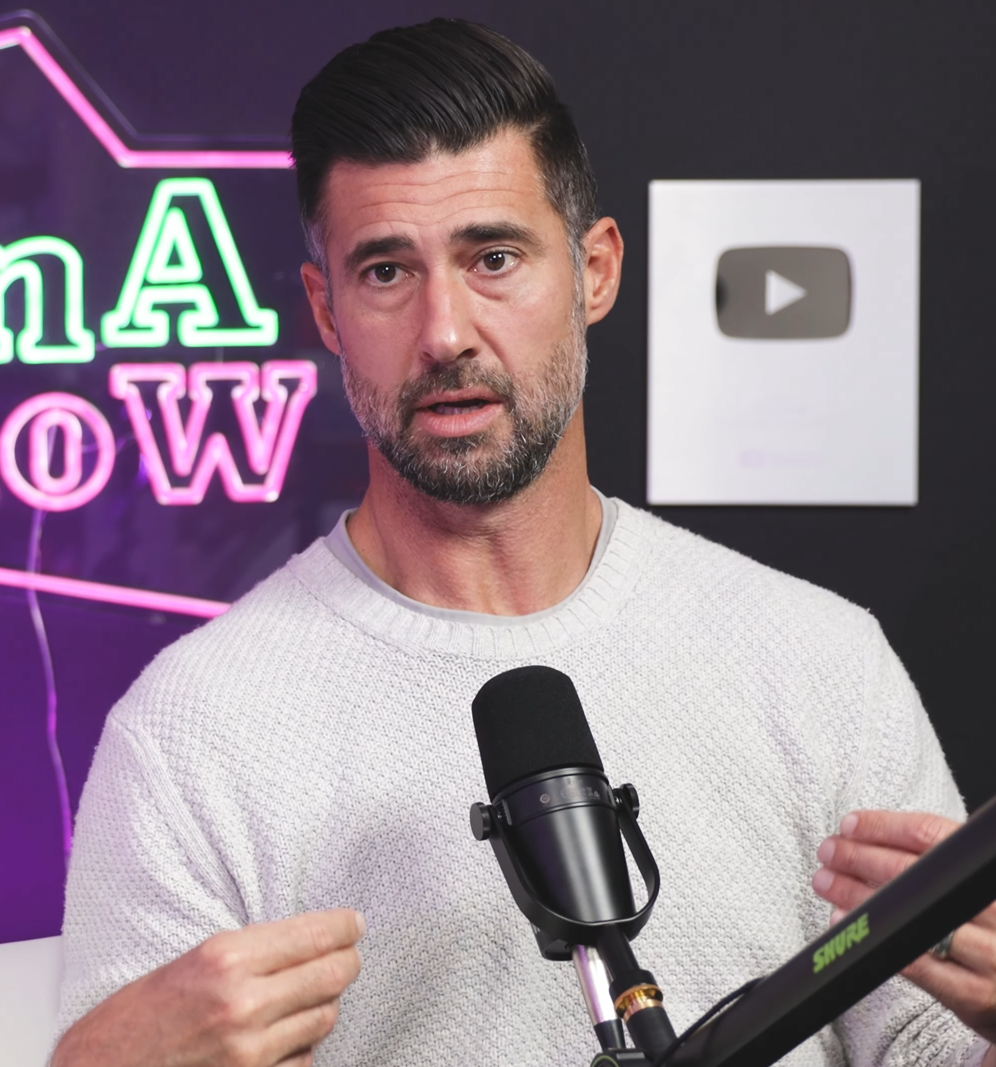
The restaurant's co-owner, Joey Harrington, in 2023

Joey Harrington, a former American football quarterback, established the Pearl Tavern with bartender Ryan Magarian and ChefStable restaurateur Kurt Huffman in December 2016. Harrington and Huffman had attempted to open a restaurant together five years prior, but nothing had come to fruition. Upon opening, Roscoe Roberson and Joel Gunderson were Pearl Tavern's chef and sommelier, respectively. Cocktails were designed by Magarian. Three percent of profits benefited the Harrington Family Foundation, Harrington's non-profit organization which "provides scholarships for Oregon students seeking to stay in-state for secondary education". In 2016, Pearl Tavern's rib steak for two and Ox's 42-ounce bone-in rib eye steak were the city's most expensive menu steaks, at $115.

Thomas Boyce replaced Roberson as executive chef in mid 2017. The switch resulted in minor changes to the menu; Mattie John Bamman of Eater Portland said the most significant difference was "a more focused approach befitting a tavern or pub" featuring "a smaller selection of more carefully sourced and prepared steaks and revamped burgers and salads". Pearl Tavern operated on Thanksgiving in 2017, screening football games and serving special entrees such as confit turkey thigh and maple glazed breast. In May 2018, owners announced plans to close in June. Magarian wrote on social media:

It's with a lot of sadness (on many levels) that my partners and I will be announcing the closure of The Pearl Tavern effective June 5th. This said, we have made a deal with a really exciting group/concept whom I believe will be not only a great fit for the corner of NW 11th and Everett, but offer the neighborhood a super awesome place to enjoy each other's company and some rad beverage and food to boot.

Backwoods Brewing Company confirmed plans to open in the space soon after Pearl Tavern's closure, and began operating on July 9.

== Reception ==
Shortly after Pearl Tavern's opening, Julie Lee of 1859 said the "adulation is immediate for the killer atmosphere, wrap around bar, big screen TV's, inviting leather booths and, most discernibly, delicious food". In 2017, Samantha Bakall included Pearl Tavern in The Oregonian's list of Portland's 10 best new happy hours, and Mattie John Bamman of Eater Portland wrote, "Pearl Tavern has received mixed reviews since opening last year, but it hasn't been totally panned or anything — although neither the O or PoMo have deemed the restaurant worthy of a full restaurant review." The Oregonian's Michael Russell included Pearl Tavern in his list of "Portland's 50 most notable restaurant openings of 2017". The Portland Mercury's Andrea Damewood recommended the burrata appetizer and the General Tso's lamb ribs. However, her review was not entirely positive; she noted "a few serious failures", including the Chinese broccoli side and the trout entree.

== See also ==
- List of steakhouses
