= Acropolis Steakhouse =

Restaurant and strip club in Portland, Oregon, U.S.

- Interactive map of Acropolis Steakhouse

Restaurant information
- Location: Portland, Multnomah, Oregon, United States
- Coordinates: 45.4625°N 122.6391°W

Acropolis Steakhouse is a restaurant and strip club in Portland, Oregon, United States. Located on Southeast McLoughlin Boulevard, the family-owned business was established in 1976. The building that houses the steakhouse was completed in 1947. The steakhouse may be closing, as of July 2026.

Willamette Week's Matthew Singer has described Acropolis as the city's "most iconic" strip club. The newspaper's Matthew Korfhage has called the business "perhaps the most classic strip club in Portland that isn't Mary's Club, known for offering cheap-ass steaks because its owner also owns a cattle ranch".

An electrician died at the restaurant in 2014. The Acropolis was sued in 2015 over a drunk driving incident. In 2018, a man filed a lawsuit against the business after a stripper threw a glass at him. Two men were shot and killed there in 2021. In 2023, a man was arresting for assaulting staff at the club.

The restaurant has billed itself as "a steakhouse with a view". It serves steak and has a salad bar. The menu has also included a club sandwich with French fries, omelettes, and beer.

== See also ==
- List of steakhouses
- List of strip clubs
