= Clyde's Prime Rib =

Steakhouse in Portland, Oregon, U.S.

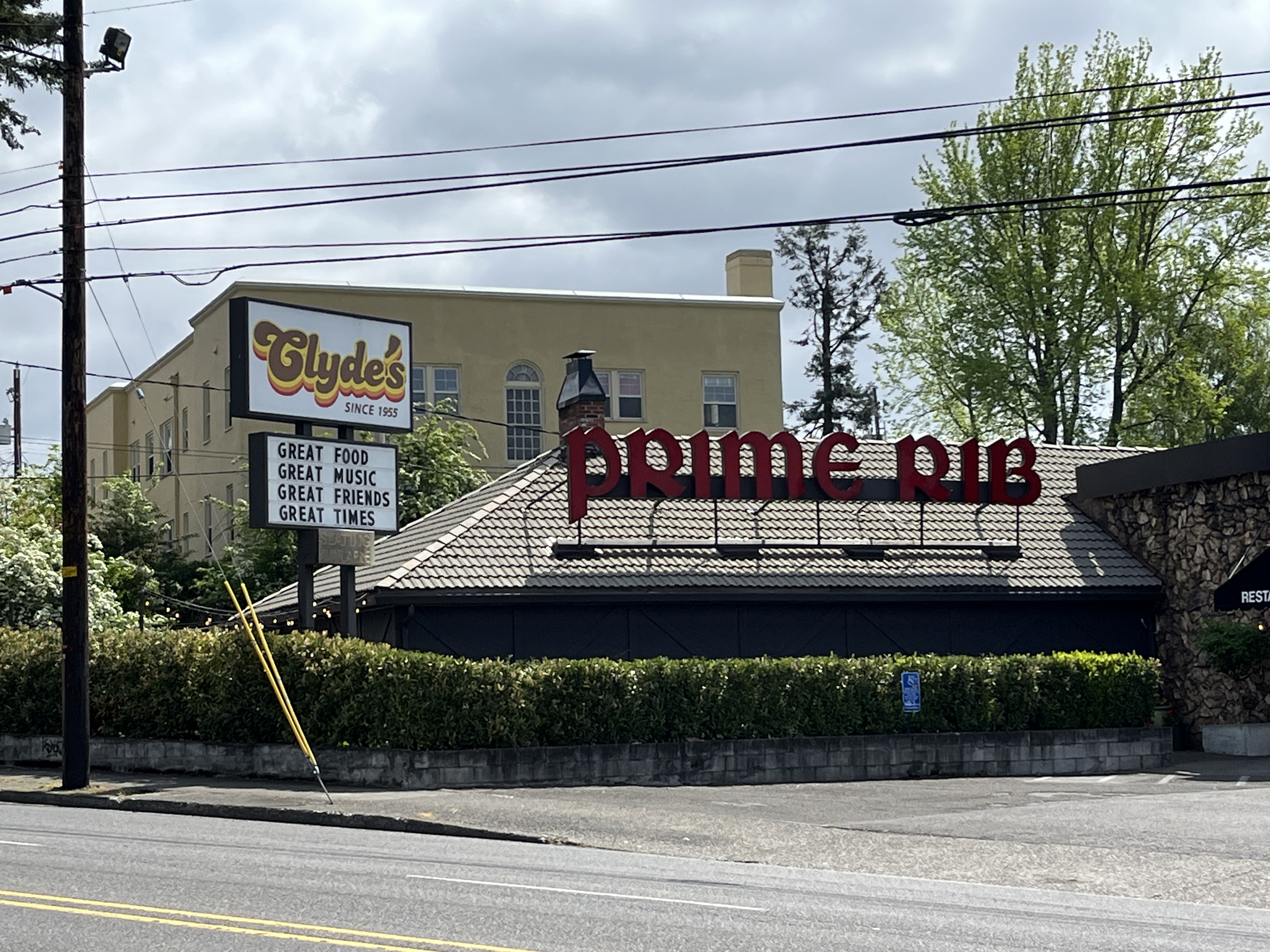
- The restaurant's exterior, 2025
- Interactive map of Clyde's Prime Rib

Restaurant information
- Owner: Alex Bond
- Previous owner: Clyde Jenkins
- Location: 5474 Northeast Sandy Boulevard, Portland, Multnomah, Oregon, 97213, United States
- Coordinates: 45.5412°N 122.6063°W
- Website: clydesprimerib.com

Clyde's Prime Rib is a steakhouse in Portland, Oregon, United States.

== Description ==
Clyde's Prime Rib is a castle-themed steakhouse with a dark dining room, located on Sandy Boulevard in northeast Portland's Rose City Park neighborhood. The interior features chandeliers, red banquettes, and wood paneling. The menu includes prime rib, country-fried steak, steak bites, Cobb salad, French onion soup, and prime rib soup. Sides include potato, jus, and seasonal vegetables. As of 2016, Clyde's offered a half-pound prime rib plate for $15 on Sundays. In 2018, the restaurant's most expensive steak was a 16 oz. ribeye for $36. The restaurant hosts live jazz.

== History ==
Established in 1954, Clyde's is among Portland's oldest restaurants. The business was Black-owned, as of 2015. Alex Bond purchased the restaurant from Clyde Jenkins in 2015.

In 2026, Clyde's was among local restaurants, community organizations, and other businesses that joined the "We Are Rip City" campaign in support of the Moda Center renovation project.

== Reception ==
Erin DeJesus included the restaurant's prime rib in Eater Portland's 2014 list of "18 of Portland's Iconic Meat Dishes", in which she described Clyde's as "hilariously old-school". Michael Russell included Clyde's in The Oregonian's 2017 list of Portland's ten best steakhouses. He also included Clyde's in the newspaper's 2018 list of "Northeast and North Portland's 40 best restaurants". Daniel Barnett and Krista Garcia included the Lounge Burger in Eater Portland's list of "17 Mind-Blowing Burgers in Portland and Beyond".

== See also ==
- List of steakhouses
