= Capa (restaurant) =

Steakhouse in Orlando, Florida, U.S.

- Interactive map of Capa

Restaurant information
- Food type: Spanish
- Location: 10100 Dream Tree Blvd. (Inside the Four Seasons Orlando), Orlando, Florida, 32836, United States
- Coordinates: 28°24′10″N 81°32′46″W

Capa is a woman-led, Spanish-style steakhouse in Orlando, Florida.

== Description ==
Condé Nast Traveler has described Capa as "a chic Spanish restaurant that has one of the best wine lists in the United States". The menu has included fried cauliflower with capers and egg, and pork cheeks with Marcona almond.

== See also ==
- List of Michelin starred restaurants in Florida
- List of Spanish restaurants
- List of steakhouses
