= Sunny's Steakhouse =

Restaurant in Miami, Florida, U.S.

- Interactive map of Sunny's Steakhouse

Restaurant information
- Location: 7357 NW Miami Court, Miami, Florida, United States
- Coordinates: 25°50′34″N 80°11′49″W

Sunny's Steakhouse is a steakhouse in Miami, Florida, United States. Aaron Brooks is the executive chef. The business was included in The New York Times's 2025 list of the nation's 50 best restaurants.

== See also ==
- List of restaurants in Miami
- List of steakhouses
