= Laurelhurst Market =

Steakhouse in Portland, Oregon, U.S.

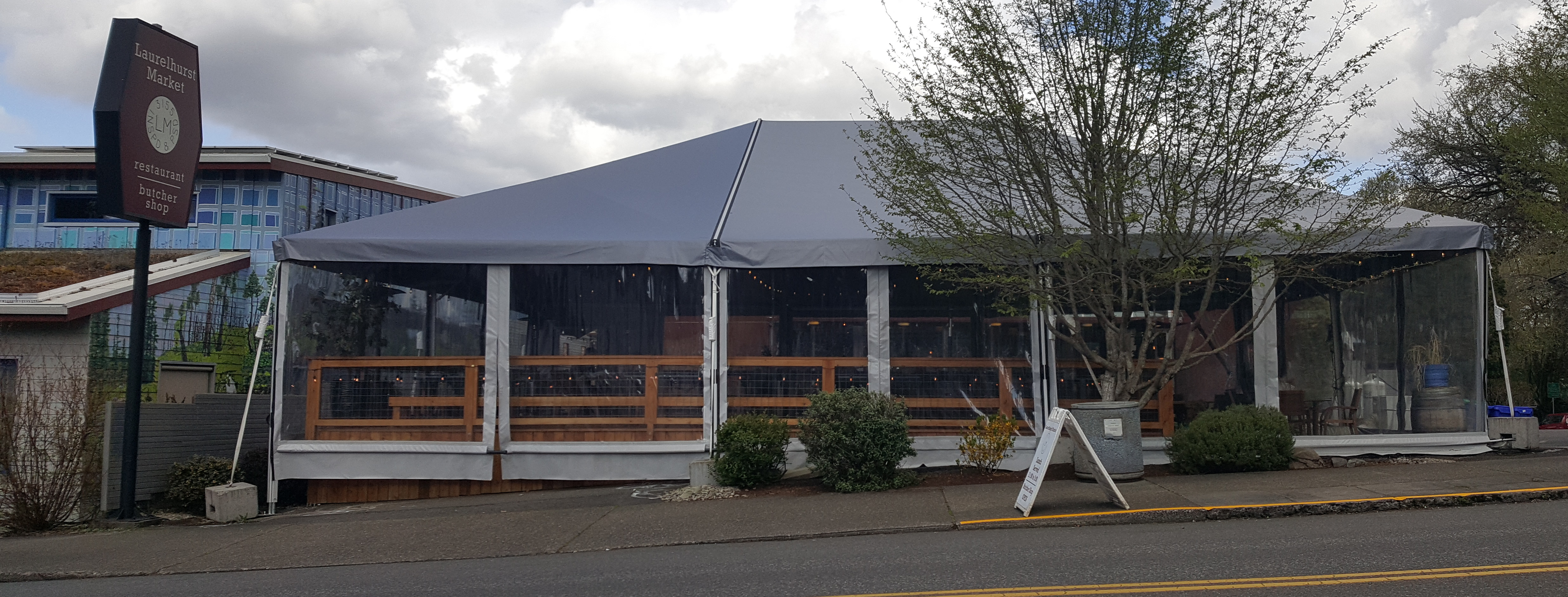
- The restaurant's exterior, 2022
- Interactive map of Laurelhurst Market

Restaurant information
- Food type: New American
- Location: Portland, Oregon, United States
- Coordinates: 45.5232°N 122.6320°W
- Website: laurelhurstmarket.com

Laurelhurst Market is a steakhouse on East Burnside Street in Portland, Oregon's Kerns neighborhood, in the United States. The New American restaurant was opened by chefs Ben Dyer, David Kreifels, and Jason Owens, in 2009.

== See also ==
- List of New American restaurants
- List of steakhouses
