= Niku Steakhouse =

Restaurant in San Francisco, California, U.S.

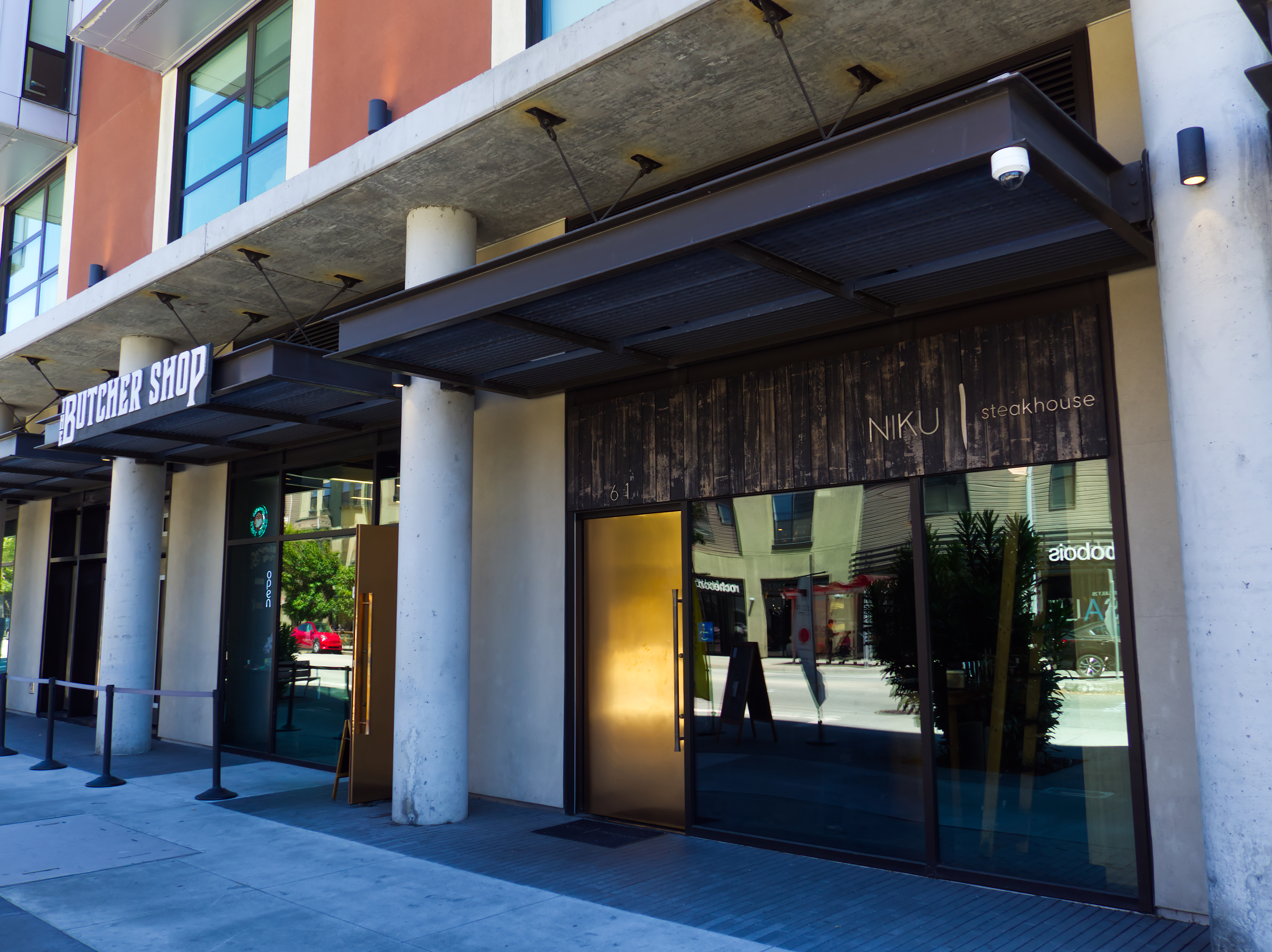
- Niku Steakhouse and the adjacent butcher shop in July 2026
- Interactive map of Niku Steakhouse

Restaurant information
- Location: 61 Division Street, San Francisco, California, United States
- Coordinates: 37.7697°N 122.4035°W
- Website: nikusteakhouse.com

Niku Steakhouse is a Michelin-starred steakhouse in San Francisco, California, United States. The restaurant is joined with The Butcher Shop, a butcher shop run by the same management.

== See also ==
- List of Michelin-starred restaurants in California
- List of steakhouses
