= STK Steakhouse =

Restaurant chain

- Traded as: Nasdaq: STKS
- Industry: Restaurant
- Genre: Steakhouse
- Headquarters: Denver, Colorado
- Number of locations: 28
- Products: Steaks, wine, seafood
- Revenue: $316.6M (2022)
- Operating income: $46.7M (2022)
- Parent: The ONE Group Hospitality, Inc.
- Website: www.stksteakhouse.com

STK Steakhouse (sometimes referred to as STK) is a modern steakhouse-lounge restaurant chain. They are owned by The ONE Group, a global hospitality company that also owns Kona Grill.

== History ==
The first STK location was in New York City. STK went public in 2013 and is traded on the NASDAQ exchange under the symbol Nasdaq: STKS. As of 2023, STK has 28 locations; 18 in the United States and 10 overseas.

== See also ==
- List of steakhouses
