= Bob Taylor's Ranch House =

Restaurant in Las Vegas, Nevada, U.S.

- Interactive map of Bob Taylor's Ranch House

Restaurant information
- Location: 6250 Rio Vista Street, Las Vegas, Nevada, United States
- Coordinates: 36.2748°N 115.2457°W
- Website: bobtaylorsranchhouse.com

Bob Taylor's Ranch House is a steakhouse in Las Vegas, Nevada, United States. It received an America's Classics award from the James Beard Foundation.

== See also ==
- List of restaurants in the Las Vegas Valley
- List of steakhouses
