= Hog's Breath Cafe =

Australian restaurant chain

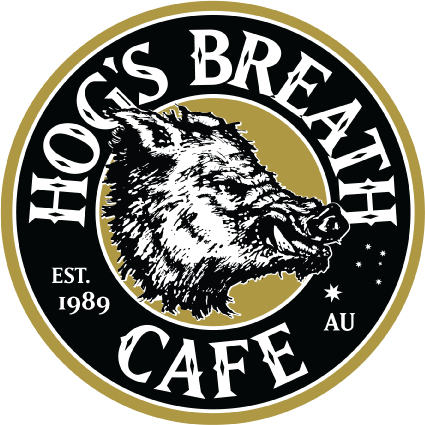

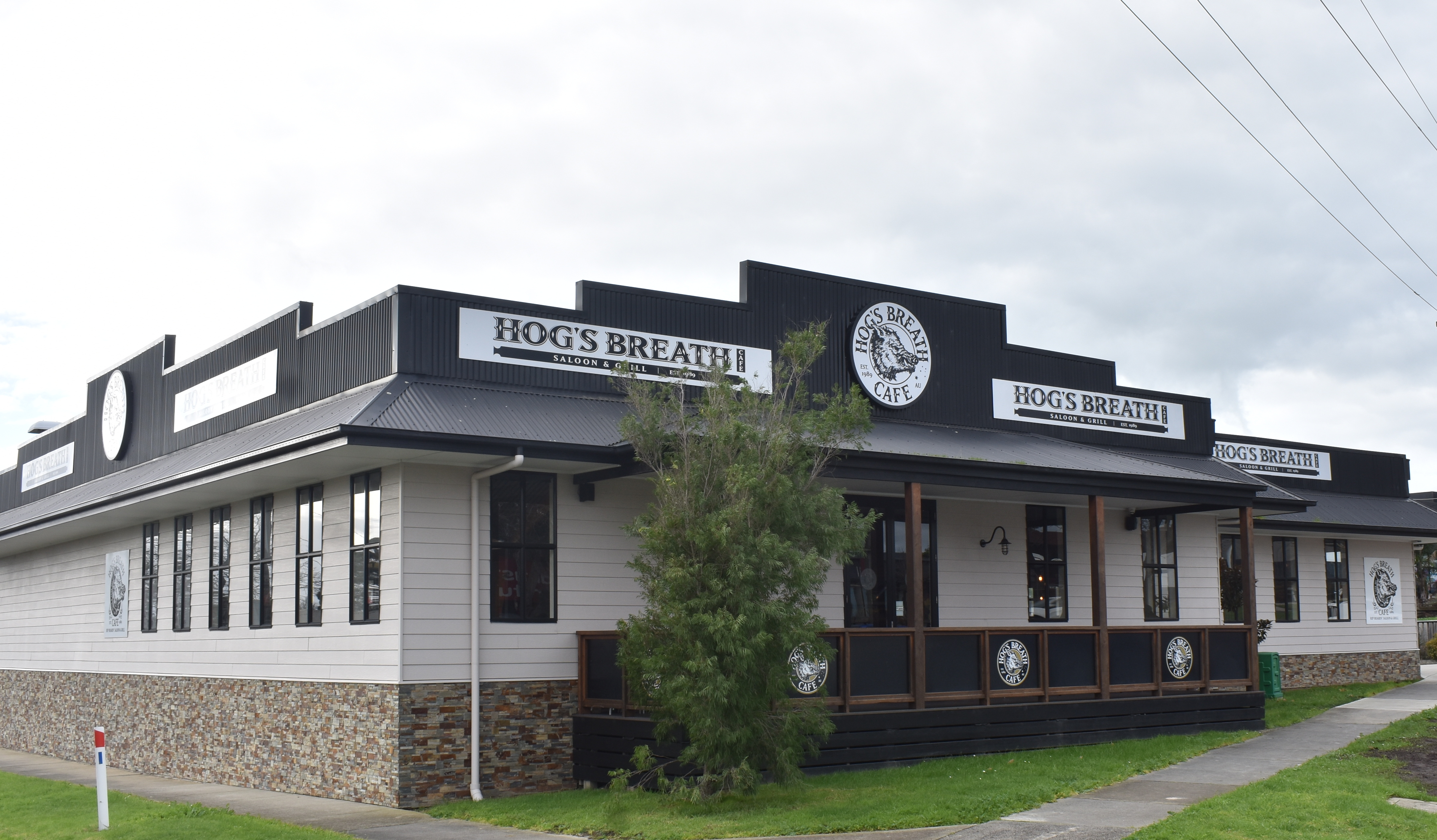
- Traralgon, Victoria location in 2026
- Industry: Restaurants
- Genre: Steakhouse
- Founded: July 1989; 37 years ago Airlie Beach, Queensland, Australia
- Founder: Don Algie
- Headquarters: Australia
- Products: Beefsteak prime rib
- Website: www.hogsbreath.com.au

Hog's Breath Cafe (also known as Hog's Australia's Steakhouse from 2016 to 2020) is an Australian and international restaurant chain and franchise of steakhouse restaurants. The restaurant purveys prime rib as its signature dish, which is slow-roasted for 18 hours.

== History ==
The first restaurant was opened in July 1989 at Airlie Beach, Queensland by Don Algie. In November the following year, a second store was opened in Mooloolaba. Additional locations quickly followed with stores opening in Townsville, Cairns and interstate Darwin.

By December 2011, there were 69 outlets operating in Australia, three outlets in New Zealand, two outlets in Thailand and one in Singapore. Hog's Breath also controlled the licensing and use of the Jamaica Joe's trademark in Australia and overseas, and planned on further expansion in other Asian countries as well as the UK, Europe and North America. Its first outlet in the Philippines opened in 2013. A restaurant also operates at Vision City Shopping Centre in Port Moresby, Papua New Guinea.

However, by the late 2010s the company's fortunes had changed for the worse, with restaurant closures resulting in only 47 Australian outlets remaining as of March 2021, down from a peak of 83. The company blamed a downturn in the restaurant sector and changing dining habits for the store closures, but a number of franchisees criticised the company for a lack of support and alleged mismanagement of the business. A short-lived rebrand to Hog's Australia's Steakhouse in 2016 was also not well received by franchisees and customers. The company tried to establish a number of spin-off businesses including Hogs Express, Funky Mexican Cantina, a Hog's food truck and Bar Nineteen89, which were all unsuccessful. As part of a touted rebuild of the brand, Don Algie returned to the business in November 2020.

In January 2024, the last South Australian franchise closed, from a peak of five restaurants. In July 2024, former CEO Steven Spurgin announced that the company was looking to rebuild its restaurant footprint, and has plans to open 20 new restaurants by 2029. As of March 2026, 17 locations of the store remain.

== Controversies ==
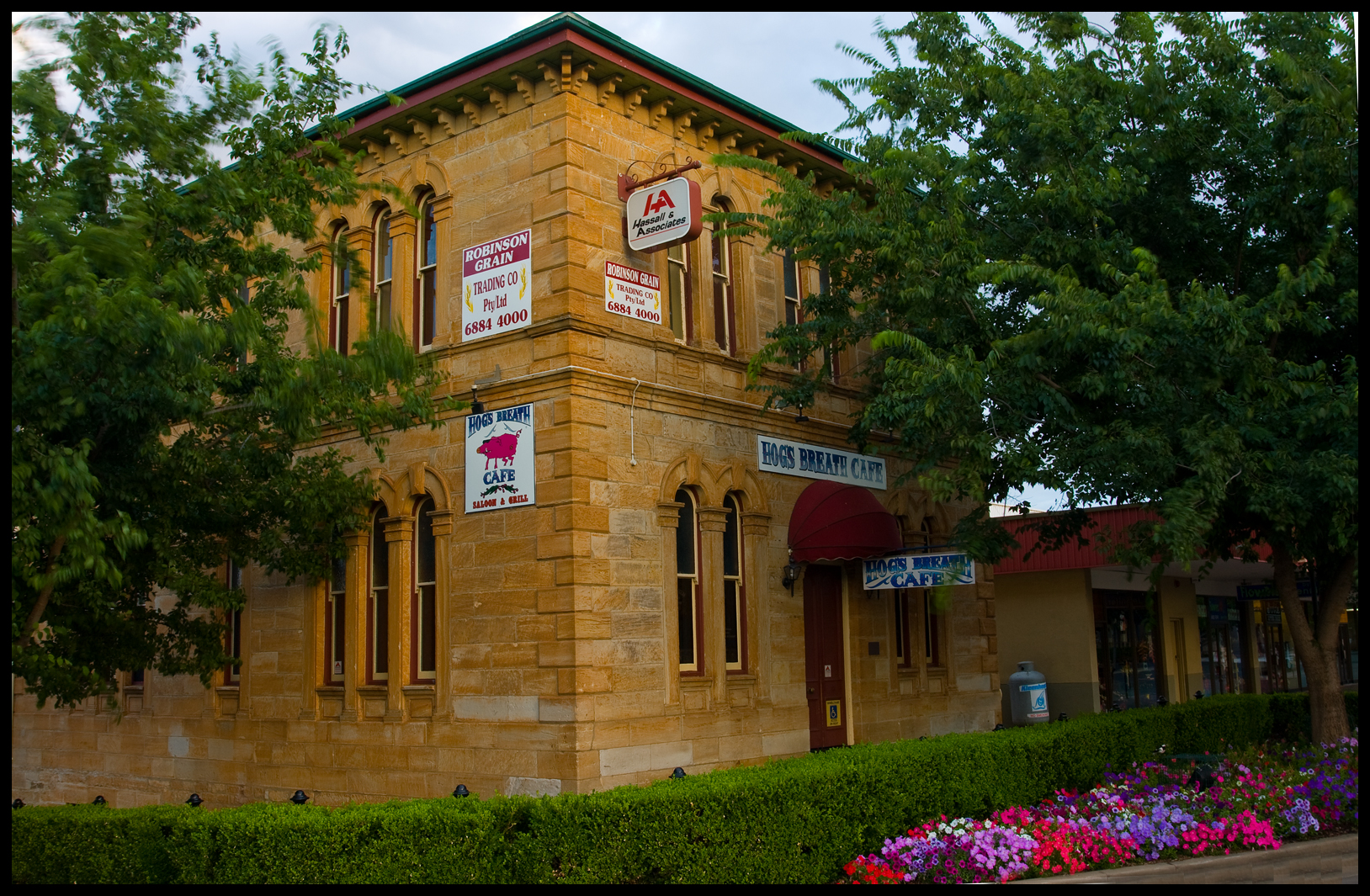
A Hog's Breath Cafe location in New South Wales

=== Founding controversy ===
A bar and restaurant named Hog's Breath Saloon had been operated by Jerry Dorminy in Fort Walton Beach, Florida, in the United States since 1976. From the late 1980s, Dorminy has used the name "Hog's Breath Café" in relation to the restaurant part of his business. It has been alleged that Algie appropriated key elements of Dorminy's business including the business name, theming and logos/artwork, in operating the Hog's Breath Cafe business in Australia.

In 1985, Dorminy employed Algie to organise and promote a series of yacht races in the United States. In mid-1986, Dorminy visited Algie in Australia, and during that visit Algie expressed interest in developing a bar and restaurant business in Australia. Dorminy subsequently asked Algie to register the business name Hog's Breath Saloon in New South Wales, in his (Dorminy's) name.

Further discussions concerning the possibility of creating an operation in Australia were reported to have taken place in 1987 and 1988. Algie subsequently claimed that he then wrote to Dorminy, saying that he (Algie) intended to open a Hog's Breath restaurant in Queensland. Dorminy later denied receipt of that letter, and asserted that he had repeatedly told Algie that "he would not be authorised" to operate his own Hog's Breath business in Australia. In July 1988, Algie applied on his own behalf to register the business names "Hog's Breath Saloon" and "Hog's Breath Cafe" in Queensland. Algie opened business as the Hog's Breath Cafe at Airlie Beach in July 1989, and in August 1989 he applied to register the first two Hog's Breath trademarks.

In the legal dispute that ensued, Dorminy's primary argument was that Algie was not entitled to secure registration because the earlier relationship between himself and Algie gave rise to an obligation by Algie to act in his (Dorminy's) interest. For reasons set out in a detailed determination dated 30 June 1994, Helen Hardie, Assistant Registrar, declined the application by Dorminy to prevent Algie from registering five Hog's Breath trademarks.

In 2006, American designer John Lamb commenced legal action against Hog's Breath in the Federal Court of Australia. Before Justice Robert French on 22 June 2007, Lamb claimed he owned copyright to a cartoon of a pig known as the "Wave Hog Work". He said he produced the pig in 1987 to promote the original Hog's Breath Saloon in Florida. Lamb alleged that, from 1996, companies controlled by a former worker at the Florida eatery had infringed his copyright in various ways including applying the pig logo to clothing related to the Hog's Breath Cafe chain in Australia. Hog's Breath subsequently agreed to pay Lamb $750,000, inclusive of Lamb's legal fees.

=== Other ===
In April 2014, a story on A Current Affair claimed that Hog's Breath had engaged lawyers Finn Roche to demand that a small industrial area takeaway on the NSW Central Coast called "Hoggy's Takeaway" cease and desist using the name Hoggy's in their business name and branding. The owner, Sam Hogg, chose the name because of his surname. He subsequently received support from the public, with more than 14,000 people signing a petition to demand that Hog's Breath Cafe retract their legal threats. Hog's Breath later applied for the trademark Hoggy's Takeaway.

In 2016 the company was accused of underpaying workers.

== See also ==
- List of restaurant chains in Australia
- List of steakhouses
