= D' La Santa =

Mexican restaurant in Seattle, Washington, U.S.

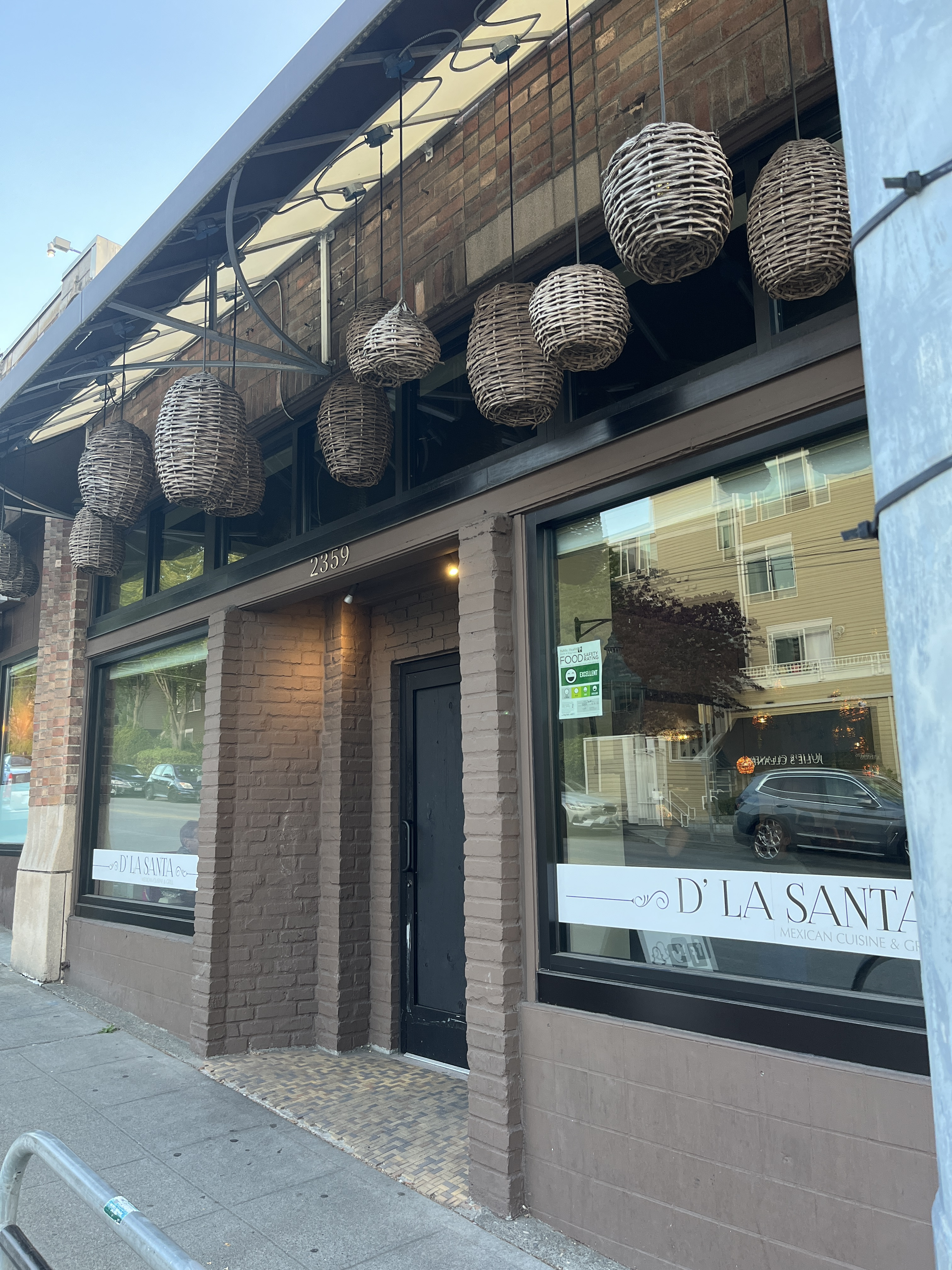
- The restaurant's exterior, 2023
- Interactive map of D' La Santa

Restaurant information
- Established: October 2017
- Owner: Angelica Villasenor
- Food type: Mexican
- Location: 2359 10th Avenue E, Seattle, King, Washington, 98102, United States
- Coordinates: 47.6412°N 122.3203°W
- Website: dlasanta.com

D' La Santa is a Mexican restaurant on Seattle's Capitol Hill, in the U.S. state of Washington. Angelica Villasenor opened the steakhouse in 2017. In addition to steak, D' La Santa serves chile en nogada, cochinita pibil, guacamole, and other regional dishes. The restaurant has garnered a positive reception.

== Description ==
The family- and Latin American-owned Mexican restaurant D' La Santa operates on 10th Avenue at Miller, on Seattle's Capitol Hill. The interior features a large driftwood tree with lanterns hanging from the branches, and a wall with numerous decorative crosses.

=== Menu ===
The menu focuses on steak and has also included tacos with various meat options such as beef birria, steak rib-eye, or shrimp and garlic butter. The steakhouse has served a 25-day dry-aged New York strip with salsa, as well as the Aguja Norteña, which has wagyu and a cactus salad.

Other menu options are Carne en su Jugo, chile en nogada, cochinita pibil, tostadas, Tomahawk steak, guacamole, and margaritas. Salsas use house-roasted tomatoes.

== History ==
Angelica Villasenor opened the restaurant in October 2017, in a space previously occupied by the restaurant Abay Ethiopian until 2015.

Like many other restaurants, D' La Santa operated via delivery and take-out at times during the COVID-19 pandemic.

== Reception ==
Seattle Weekly's Nicole Sprinkle recommended the cochinita pibil in 2017. In 2022, Aimee Rizzo of The Infatuation said the restaurant had Seattle's best Mexican food and opined, "D' La Santa is something you really do need in your life." She and Kayla Sager-Riley also included the business in the website's 2024 overviews of the city's best Mexican restaurants and best restaurants on Capitol Hill. Zuri Anderson ranked D' La Santa second in iHeart's 2022 list of Seattle's best steakhouses based on Yelp.

Allecia Vermillion included D' La Santa in Seattle Metropolitan's 2022 lists of the city's "great" tacos and Mexican restaurants, as well as "greatest" steakhouses. The magazine has also said the "companionable spot ... remains an undersung gem". Gabe Guarantee and Megan Hill included D' La Santa in Eater Seattle's 2022 overview of recommended eateries for steak, and Harry Cheadle and Charlie Lahud-Zahner included the business in the website's overview of sixteen "mouth-watering" Mexican restaurants in the metropolitan area in 2024.

== See also ==
- List of Mexican restaurants
- List of steakhouses
