= Boa Steakhouse =

American fine dining steakhouse

BOA Steakhouse
- Type: Subsidiary
- Industry: Fine dining
- Founded: 2001; 25 years ago in West Hollywood, California, U.S.
- Number of locations: 5
- Area served: California, Nevada, Texas
- Parent: IDG
- Website: www.boasteak.com

BOA Steakhouse (originally named Balboa Steakhouse) is a modern, high-energy steakhouse restaurant chain. They are owned by Innovative Dining Group, a company that owns various restaurants including Sushi Roku.

As of 2025, they have five locations with the original location that opened in West Hollywood in 2001. BOA has a reputation as an influencer and celebrity hangout.

== Awards ==
- 2019 “Best of Award of Excellence” by Wine Spectator

== See also ==
- List of steakhouses
