= Sayler's Old Country Kitchen =

Steakhouse in Portland, Oregon, U.S.

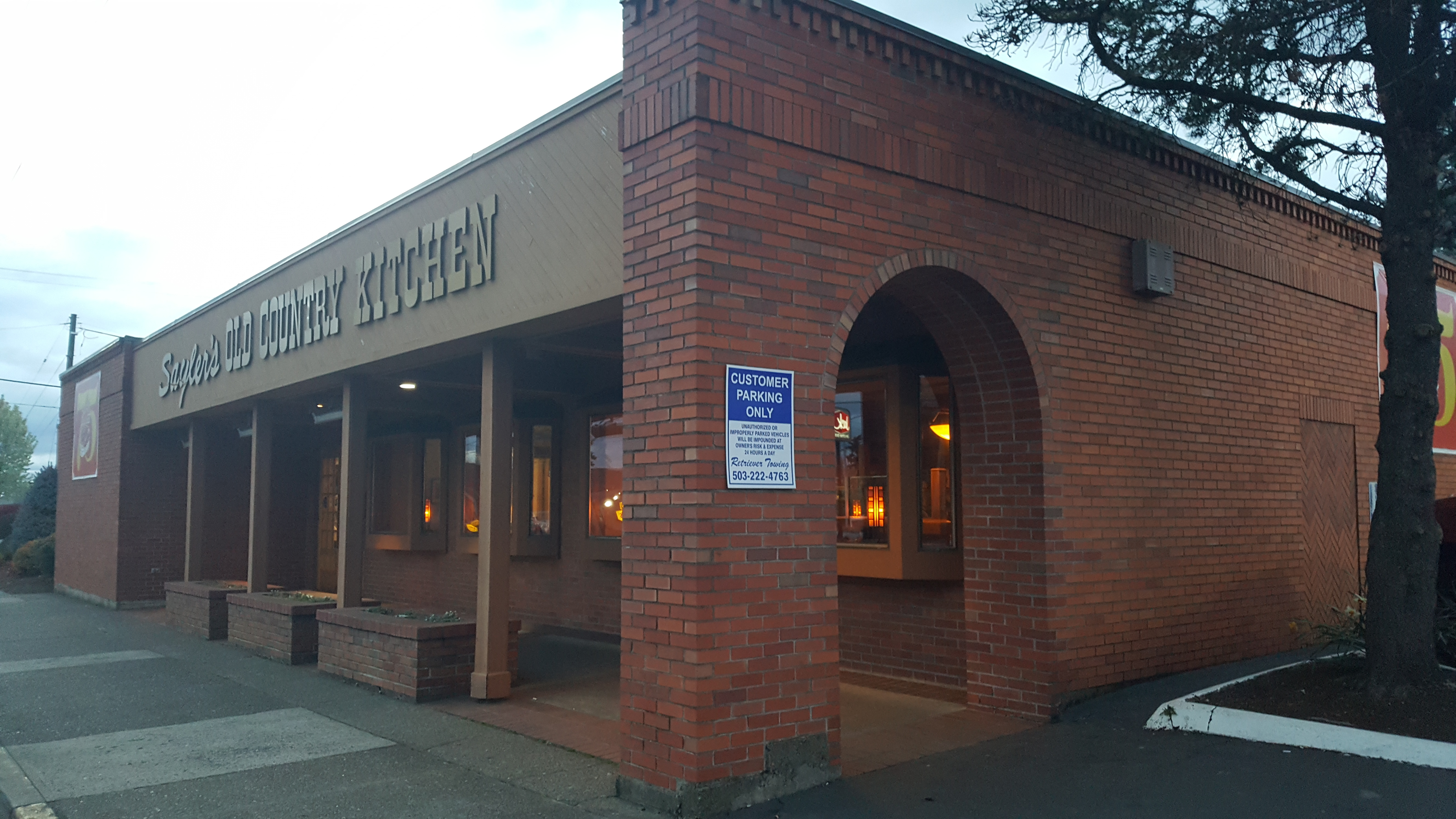
- The restaurant's exterior in 2022
- Interactive map of Sayler's Old Country Kitchen

Restaurant information
- Established: 1946
- Food type: American
- Location: 10519 Southeast Stark Street, Portland, Multnomah, Oregon, 97216, United States
- Coordinates: 45.5191°N 122.5552°W
- Website: saylers.com

Sayler's Old Country Kitchen is a steakhouse in Portland, Oregon's Hazelwood neighborhood, in the United States.

== Description and history ==
Established in 1946, the restaurant has hosted a 72-ounce steak challenge since 1948. The challenge lets people eat for free "if they can consume every edible part of the steak plus two celery sticks, two carrot sticks, two olives, two dill pickles, one regular salad, ten french fries or one baked potato and one slice of bread within an hour". 714 people had successfully completed the challenge, as of August 2025.

Sayler's has also served chicken fried steak. The restaurant once had a rotating sign showing a steak, which has been replaced by a stationary sign. Sayler's has been managed by three generations of the Sayler family.

== Reception ==
In 2016, Sayler's was named Portland's best steakhouse in The Oregonian's People's Choice poll. The newspaper's Michael Russell ranked Sayer's number ten in his 2016 list of the city's best steakhouses. In Willamette Week's 2016 overview of the city's best East Portland restaurants, Matthew Korfhage said the restaurant "looks like the lobby of a Red Lion but has the community feeling of a summer camp that lasts forever". He also described the steak challenge as Portland's most famous food challenge. In 2018, Kashann Kilson of Thrillist recommended Sayler's for a "feel for Old Portland".

== See also ==
- List of steakhouses
