= Joule (restaurant) =

Restaurant in Seattle, Washington, U.S.

- Interactive map of Joule

Restaurant information
- Location: 3506 Stone Way N, Seattle, King, Washington, 98103, United States
- Coordinates: 47°38′59″N 122°20′32.5″W

Joule is a Korean fusion restaurant in Seattle, in the U.S. state of Washington.

== Description and history ==
Located in the Wallingford neighborhood, the steakhouse is owned by married chefs Rachel Yang and Seif Chirchi. Joule opened in 2007. The kalbi has a marinade with sake, mirin, pureed Asian pear, garlic, and soy sauce, and is served with gochujang and kimchi. The menu has also included hanger steak with fermented soybean, a flat iron steak with pepper, tteok (Korean rice cakes), pickled mustard greens, and chorizo. The restaurant makes and smokes tofu, sometimes adding a confit of hon-shimeji mushrooms, thyme, and soy-truffle vinaigrette. A dessert called the "Joule box" has tapioca in coconut milk with grapefruit panna cotta and coconut.

== See also ==
- List of Korean restaurants
- List of steakhouses
