= Taste of Texas =

Steakhouse in Houston, Texas, U.S.

Coordinates: 29.7828°N 95.5569°W

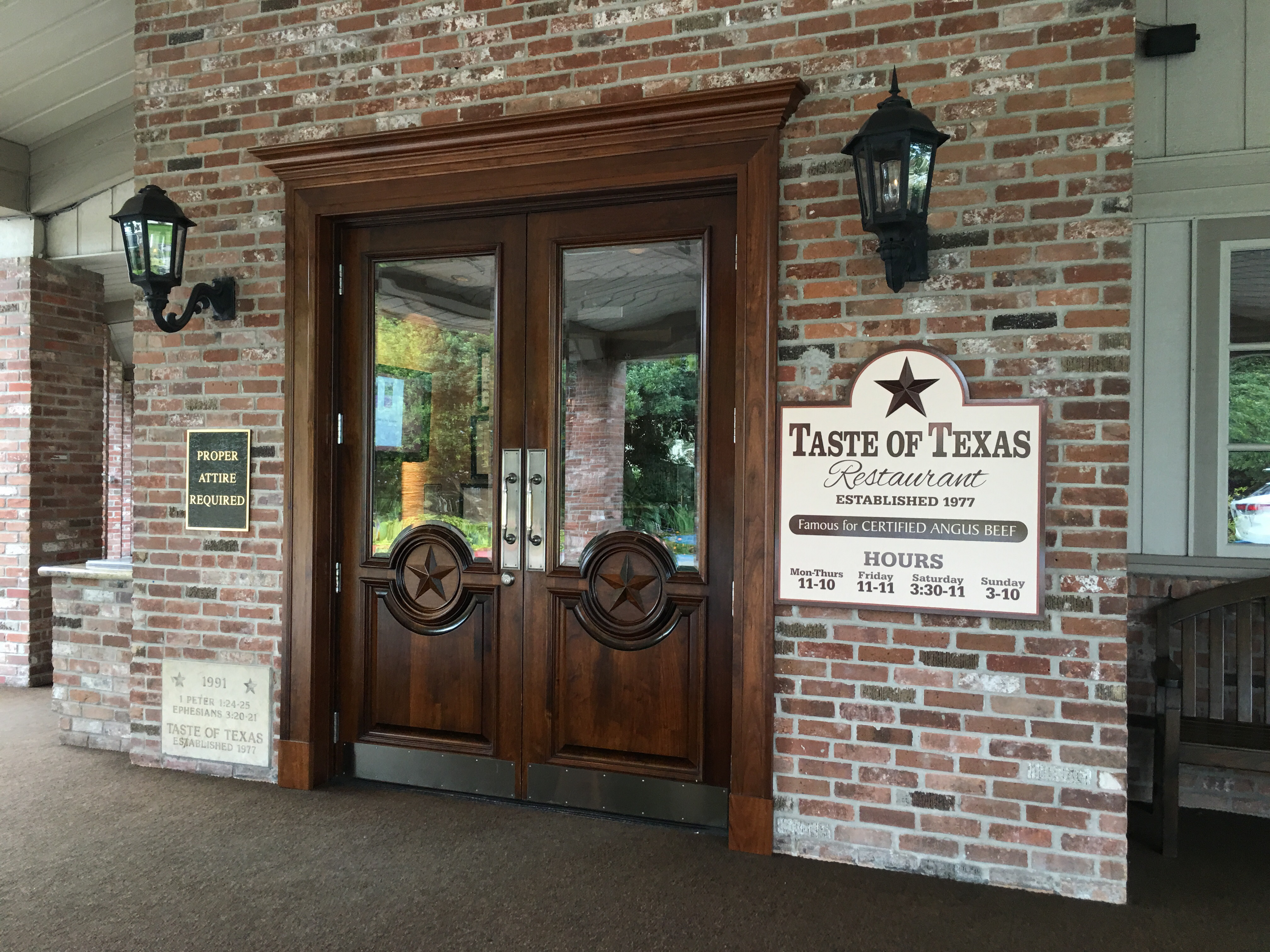
- Exterior of Taste of Texas
- Interactive map of Taste of Texas

Restaurant information
- Location: Houston, Texas, United States
- Website: tasteoftexas.com

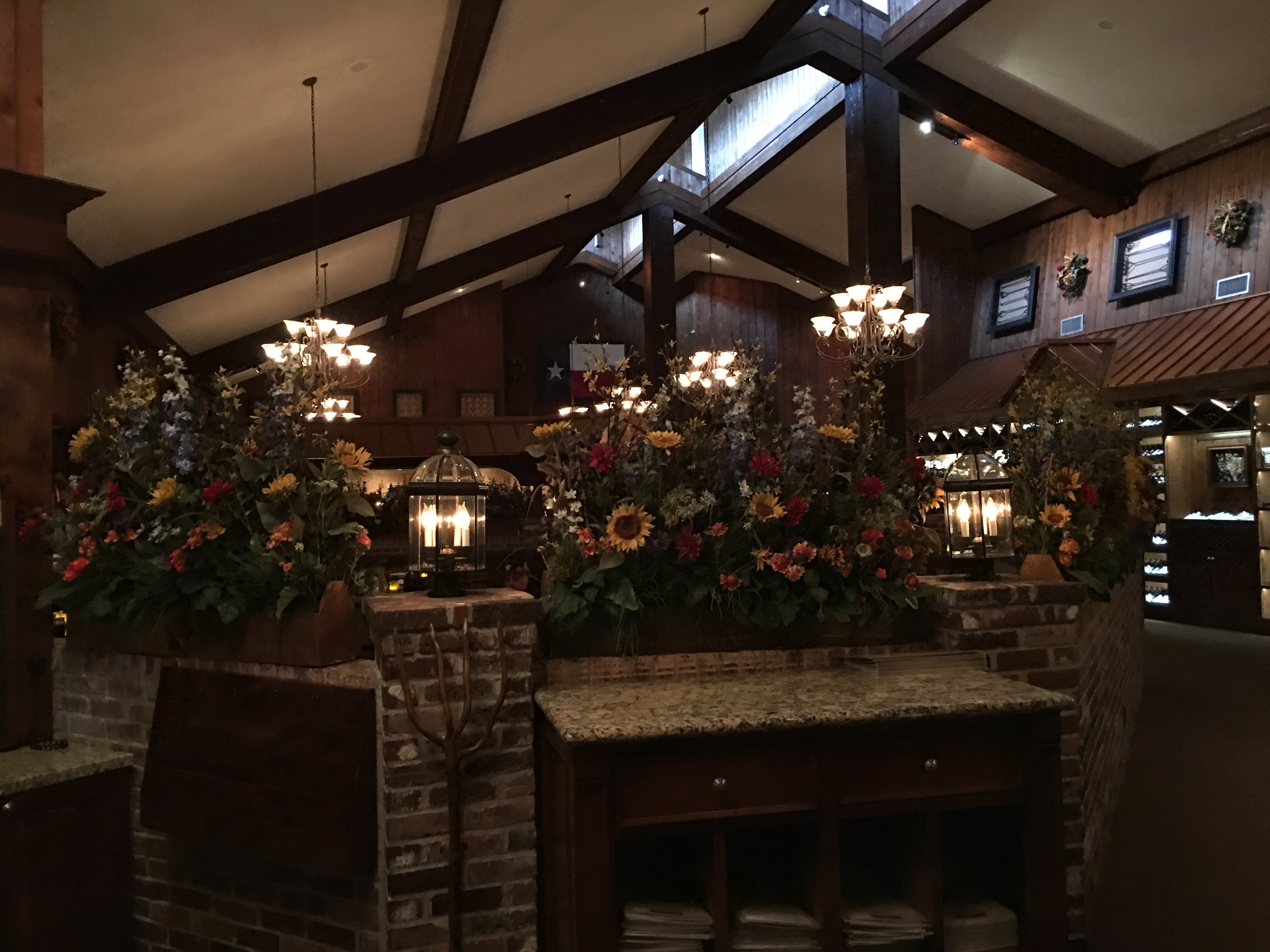
The restaurant's interior

Taste of Texas is a family-owned and operated steakhouse in Houston, in the U.S. state of Texas. The restaurant is among the top independent steakhouses in the United States and the nation's largest user of Certified Angus Beef brand ®, as of 2018. Thrillist has described Taste of Texas as a "casual, family-friendly favorite". The restaurant also serves as a museum and has a collection of artifacts related to Texas history. Taste of Texas underwent a major renovation in 2018.

Taste of Texas had approximately 200 employees, as of 2020. During the COVID-19 pandemic, the restaurant offered delivery service and toilet paper with orders.

== See also ==
- List of steakhouses
