= A Hereford Beefstouw =

Danish steakhouse chain

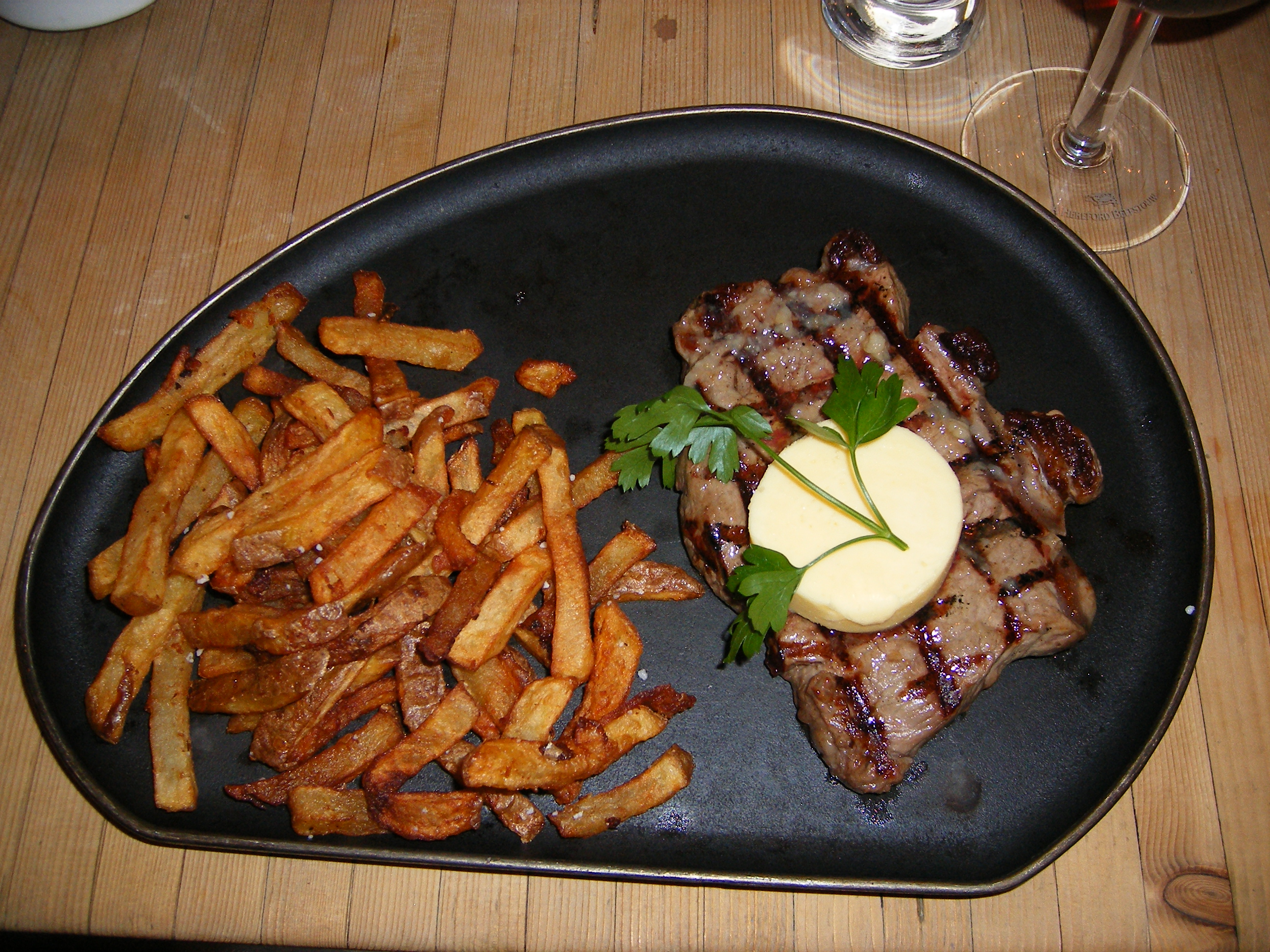
Sirloin Steak with Garlic Butter and French Fries served at one of A Hereford Beefstouw's branches in Copenhagen

A Hereford Beefstouw is a Danish steakhouse restaurant chain. It was founded in 1971, when the company opened its first restaurant in Herning, Denmark. Since then it has expanded to 12 restaurants in Denmark, along with restaurants in Adelaide, Australia; Nuuk, Greenland; and Gothenburg, Sweden.
