= Hazelwood, Portland, Oregon =

Neighborhood in Portland, Oregon

Hazelwood
- Neighborhood
- Interactive map of Hazelwood
- Coordinates: 45°31′16″N 122°32′07″W
- Country: United States
- State: Oregon
- City: Portland

Government
  - Association: Hazelwood Neighborhood Association
  - Coalition: East Portland Neighborhood Office

Area
  - Total: 4.04 sq mi (10.47 km^{2})

Population (2010)
  - Total: 23,462
  - Density: 5,804/sq mi (2,241/km^{2})

Housing
  - No. of households: 9801
  - Occupancy rate: 93% occupied
  - Owner-occupied: 4129 households (42%)
  - Renting: 5027 households (51%)
  - Avg. household size: 2.39 persons

Hazelwood is a neighborhood in the Northeast and Southeast sections of Portland, Oregon. Prior being annexed by Portland, the community was enumerated as a Census-designated place.

The community recorded a population of 25,541 in 1980, 11,480 in 1990, 19,916 in 2000, and 23,462 in 2010.

== See also ==
- Mall 205
- Sayler's Old Country Kitchen
