= Frankie & Johnnie's Steakhouse =

Steakhouse in New York City

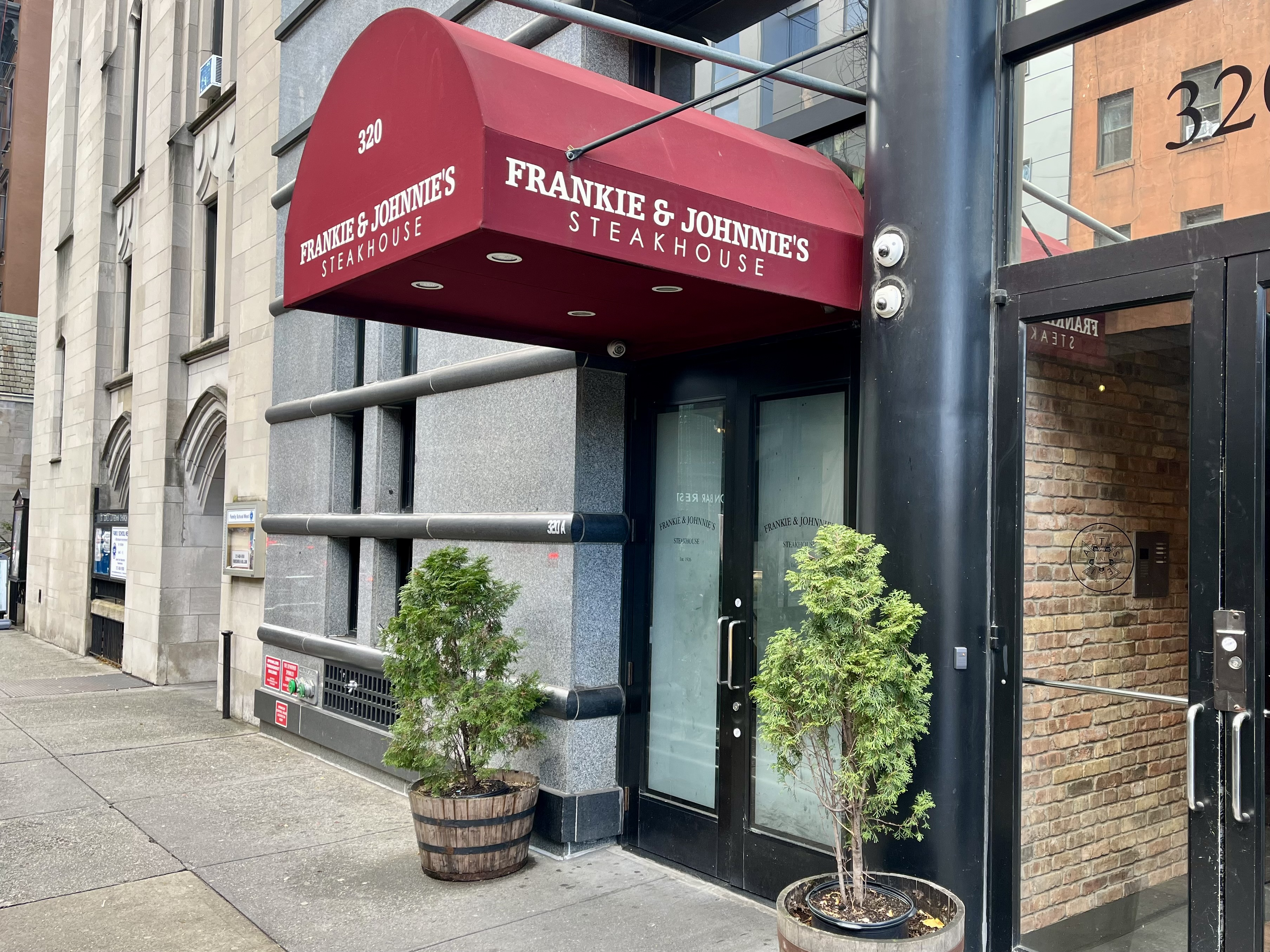
- The West 46th Street location in 2023
- Interactive map of Frankie & Johnnie's Steakhouse

Restaurant information
- Established: 1926; 100 years ago
- Owners: Gus Chimos & Billy Chimos
- Food type: Steakhouse
- Location: 320 West 46th Street, Manhattan, New York City, New York, 10036, United States
- Coordinates: 40°45′36″N 73°59′20″W
- Other locations: 32 West 37th Street, New York, NY 10018; 77 Purchase Street, Rye, NY 10580
- Website: Frankie & Johnnie's Steakhouse

Frankie & Johnnie's Steakhouse is a steakhouse and former speakeasy established in 1926, with its flagship location being on West 46th Street in Hell's Kitchen, Manhattan, which is commonly known as Restaurant Row.

== History ==
Frankie & Johnnie's first opened in 1926 on West 45th Street as a speakeasy during the Prohibition Era. According to urban legends, access to the original speakeasy was gained by knocking on an unmarked door and using the password "Frankie", to which the person behind the door would reply "Johnnie". This was the birth of the moniker and eventual business name "Frankie & Johnnie's". After the prohibition period ended in 1933, the restaurant became a popular steakhouse, serving steaks, chops, wines, and appetizers.

=== 2015 Relocation ===
On December 29, 2015, the original Frankie & Johnnie's location at West 45th Street closed and relocated to 320 West 46th Street in Restaurant Row in Hell's Kitchen. According to a press release, the new location was larger than the original, consisting of two levels, a seating capacity of over 140, a private dining room area, and a large bar.

== Locations ==
Frankie & Johnnie's Steakhouse has 3 locations. The original location opened in 1926. A second location was opened in Rye in Westchester County in 1999. In 2002, a third Frankie & Johnnie's location opened on West 37th Street in New York City. The address was formerly a townhouse owned by actor John Barrymore.

== See also ==
- List of restaurants in New York City
- List of steakhouses
