= The Willo Steakhouse =

Coordinates: 39.2687°N 121.0572°W

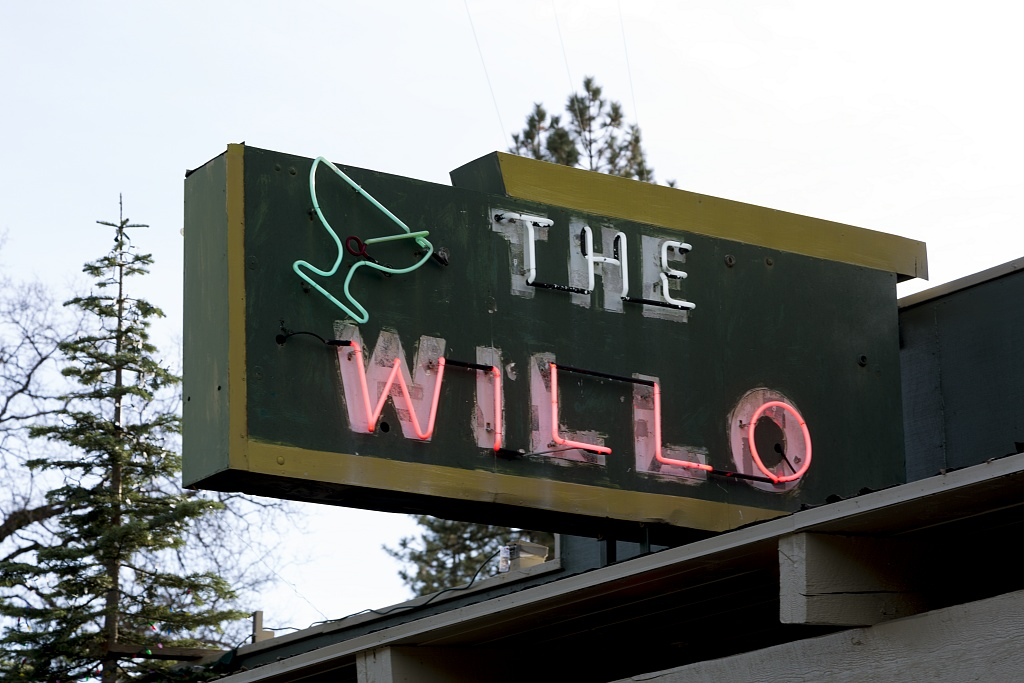
- Interactive map of The Willo Steakhouse

Restaurant information
- Established: 1947; 79 years ago
- Owners: Mike Byrne; Nancy Wilson
- Previous owners: Bill Davis (1947-1963); Bob & Peggy Tucker (1963-1969); Frank Williams & Veda Folden (1969-1976); Ken & Jeannie Hiebert (1976-2012)
- Food type: Steakhouse
- Dress code: Casual
- Location: 16898 State Hwy 49, Nevada City, Nevada County, California, 95959, United States
- Reservations: Yes
- Website: www.thewillo.com

The Willo Steakhouse (also called The Willo) is a steakhouse and roadhouse located in Nevada City, California in the United States.

== History ==
The Willo started as a Quonset hut, which was purchased by Bill Davis in 1947. The hut was brought from Sacramento and set up at its current location on California State Route 49 in Nevada City. Eventually, he sold the bar to two locals named Smitty and Smokey. It was then bought by Peggy and Bob Tucker in 1963. They named it Tuck's Hut. They expanded it to have a grill and served hamburgers. It was then leased to Frank Williams in 1969. Williams named it The Willo, which is a blend of his last name and Lola, his wife's given name. The restaurant was expanded to its current size by Williams and Veda Folden, who partnered to create the steakhouse. It was bought in 1976 by Ken and Jeannie Hiebert.

Around 2003, the restaurant was purchased by real estate brokers Mike Byrne and Nancy Wilson. They wanted to purchase a business in the area and decided to buy the Willo. The restaurant averages 150 dinners a night on the weekends. The Willo claims to have sold over one million steaks since the restaurant opened.

== Cuisine ==
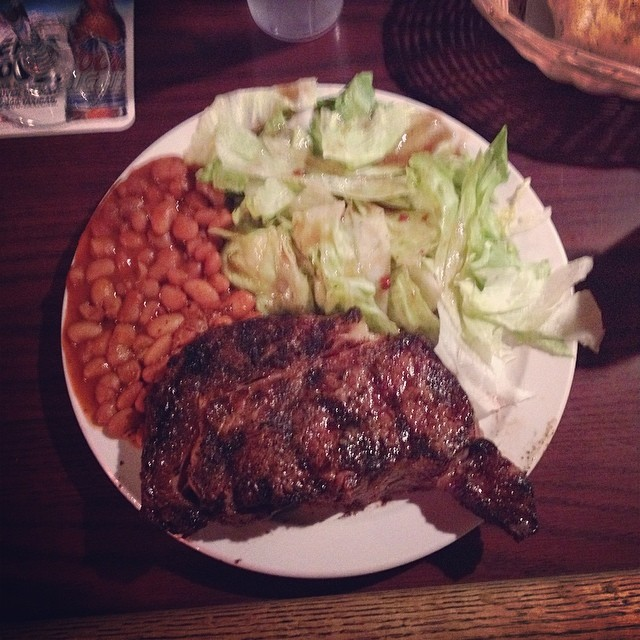
A ribeye steak, beans and iceberg lettuce at the Willo.

The Willo is a steakhouse. The house speciality is a strip steak.

== Reception ==
The San Francisco Bay Guardian called the Willo a "roadhouse extraordinaire," and rated it as the 2nd best reason to "love Nevada City." They describe the Willo as "part redneck party in the rowdy bar, part retro dream with neon sign shining like a beacon from the dark..." It has also been compared to a place that could be seen in the television program Twin Peaks. The News & Review called the Willo one of the "few bastions of culinary Americana," and the reviewer acknowledges that they were surprised to see that they still serve Catalina dressing and that the martini glasses are smaller than most used today. 7x7 calls it a dive bar and called the bartender "surly".
