= The Pine Club =

Steakhouse in Dayton, OH USA founded 1947

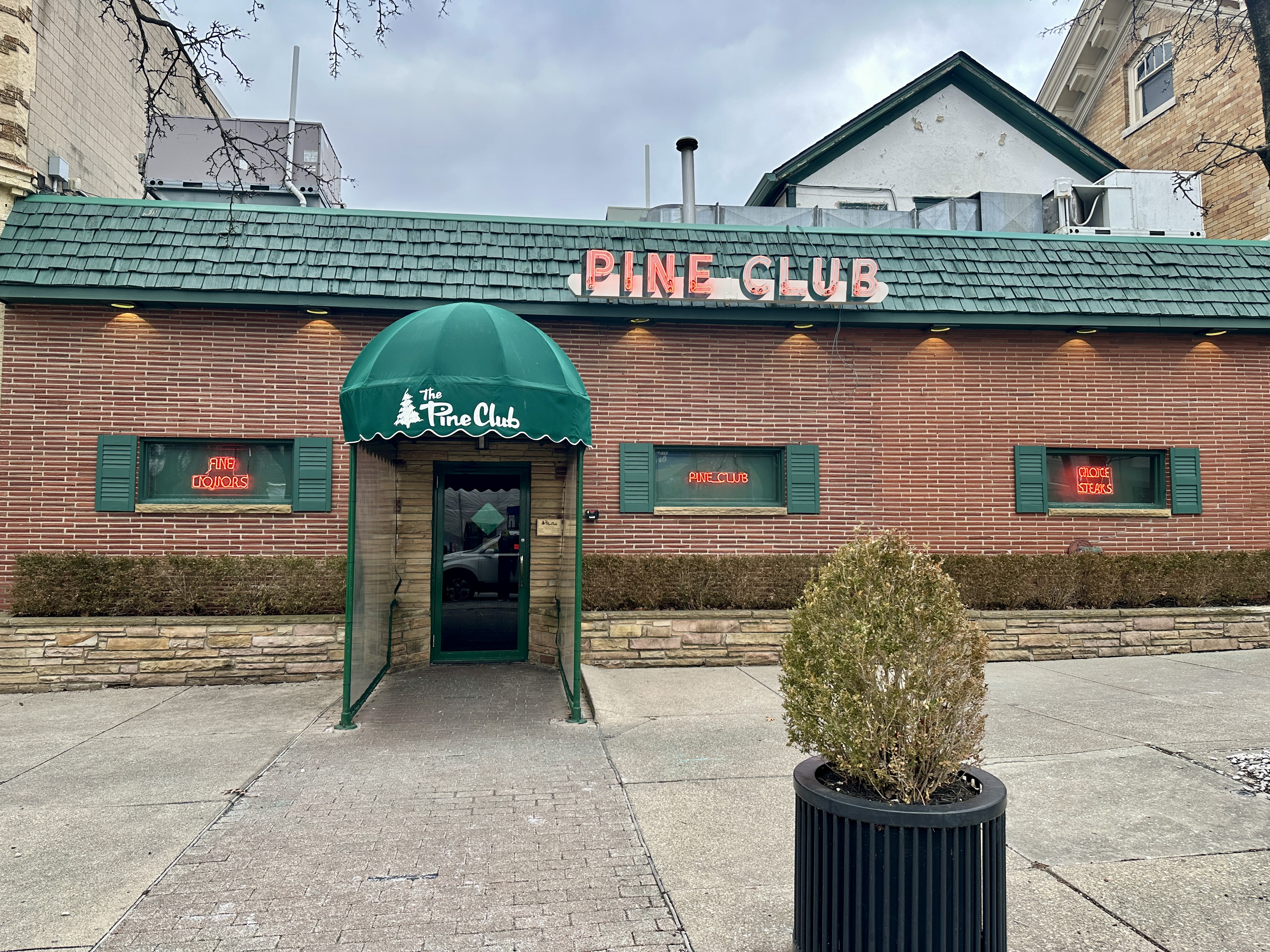
- Interactive map of The Pine Club

Restaurant information
- Established: 1947; 79 years ago
- Previous owners: Jim Sullivan, Lloyd Meinzer, Dave Hulme
- Food type: Steakhouse
- Location: 1926 Brown St, Dayton, Montgomery, Ohio, 45409, USA
- Coordinates: 39°44′01″N 84°10′48″W
- Website: thepineclub.com

The Pine Club is a steakhouse in Dayton, Ohio. Founded in 1947, it has received numerous awards and accolades through the years and garnered national attention from food writers and critics.

== History ==
The Pine Club was founded in 1947. Original owner Jim Sullivan bought Lonnie's Bar, paneled the interior in pine, and opened it as steak house. Sullivan owned the restaurant from 1947–1954. Lloyd Meinzer purchased it in 1954 and added space to the south, expanding seating and doubling the size of the bar. Dave Hulme bought it in 1979 and sold in 2018 in a private sale with the new owner undisclosed but described by Hulme as "completely passive with no role in operations".

== Business model ==
The Pine Club doesn't serve dessert and accepts no credit cards or reservations. Doors open at 4:00 Monday thru Saturday, but no food orders are taken before 4:30. It is not uncommon for a line to form by 3:30 on a Saturday.

When Secret Service agents asked for a table for George and Barbara Bush in 1988 while he was in town on a campaign stop, they were told the wait was 45 minutes. Customers may open a house account on the spot, with a bill sent to their home address; according to the general manager, as of 2022 at least half of sales are billed to house accounts.

The restaurant also owns neighboring properties, which it purchased in order to control what kinds of businesses would go in nearby. A nearby building the restaurant owns houses a Ben & Jerry's; Hulme, referring to the restaurant's lack of dessert, said "That’s the reason I put Ben & Jerry’s over there." In 2022 the restaurant purchased another nearby property; the general manager said "we didn’t want it to become a bar or something next to us". The previous owner of the property was the University of Dayton, which had purchased it four years earlier, also with the goal of controlling the use and ensuring the site "would be compatible with the neighborhood and the university".

== Menu ==
The menu of "classic steak house food" is "virtually unchanged from the day it opened." The addition of salmon to the menu in the early 2020s was discussed for several years.

In 2019 owner David Hulme, commenting on the unchanged menu, said, "there are no sauces or preparations that need to be done." and that "onion rings go on every steak dinner for 72 years."

== Description ==
The restaurant interior is paneled in pine and dimly lit. Seating capacity is about 120.

During the COVID-19 pandemic, it offered outdoor dining.

== Reception ==
=== National ===
In 2019 The Pine Club was featured on Cooking Channel's The Best Thing I Ever Ate as chef and restaurateur Jonathon Sawyer's choice. Sawyer said, "Complementing this perfect piece of meat is 75 years of history and wood and lighting and service and martini. It's the whole experience that's the best thing I ever ate."

In 2015, Food Network named it the #2 steakhouse in the country, calling it "an unmatched blend of high-end dining and Midwest hospitality."

In 2013, The New York Times' Style Magazine, T Magazine, named it one of "10 of the World's Greatest Old Dining Institutions." In 2012, Michael Stern named it his favorite steakhouse in the country. Jane and Michael Stern wrote in 500 Things to Eat Before It's Too Late and the Very Best Places to Eat Them that the Pine Club's hamburger "may be the biggest flavored hamburger anywhere." In 2006, Gourmet named them one of ten restaurants serving the best fried potatoes in the country.

=== Local ===
The Pine Club won three categories in Dayton.com's Best of 2018 awards: Best Classic Restaurant, Best Fine Dining and Best Steak. The Dayton Daily News called it "iconic".

== Gallery ==
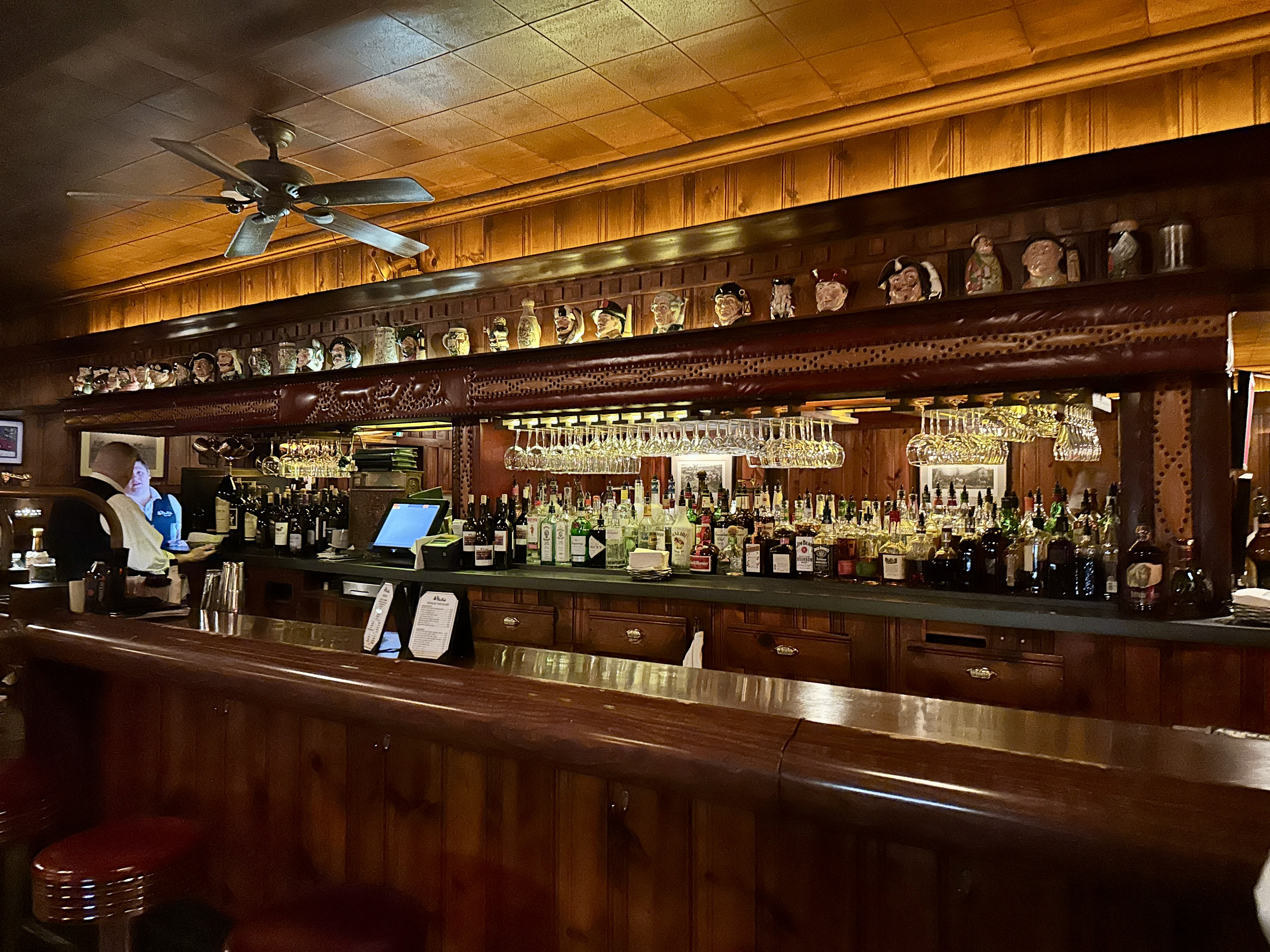
Bar

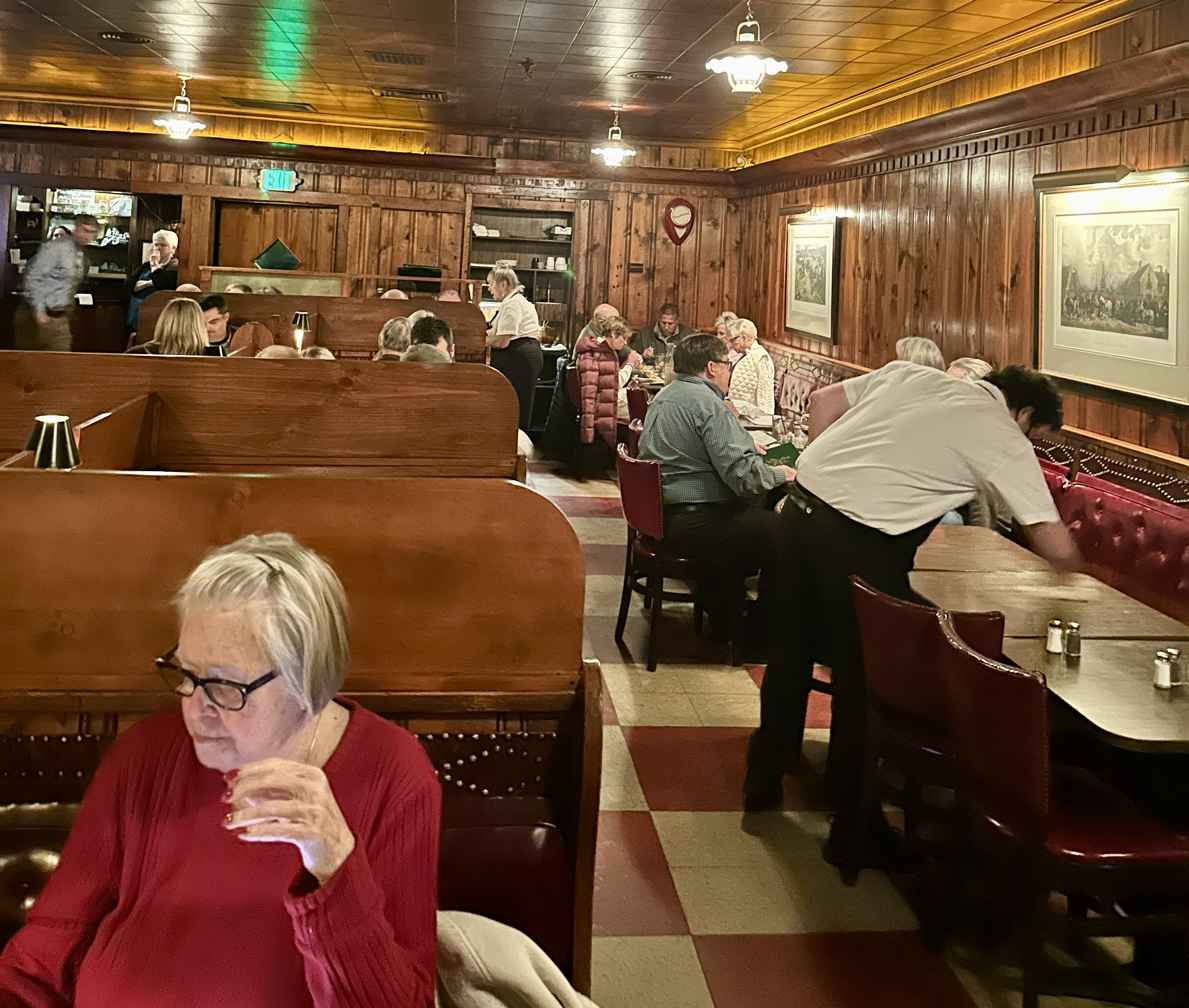
Seating

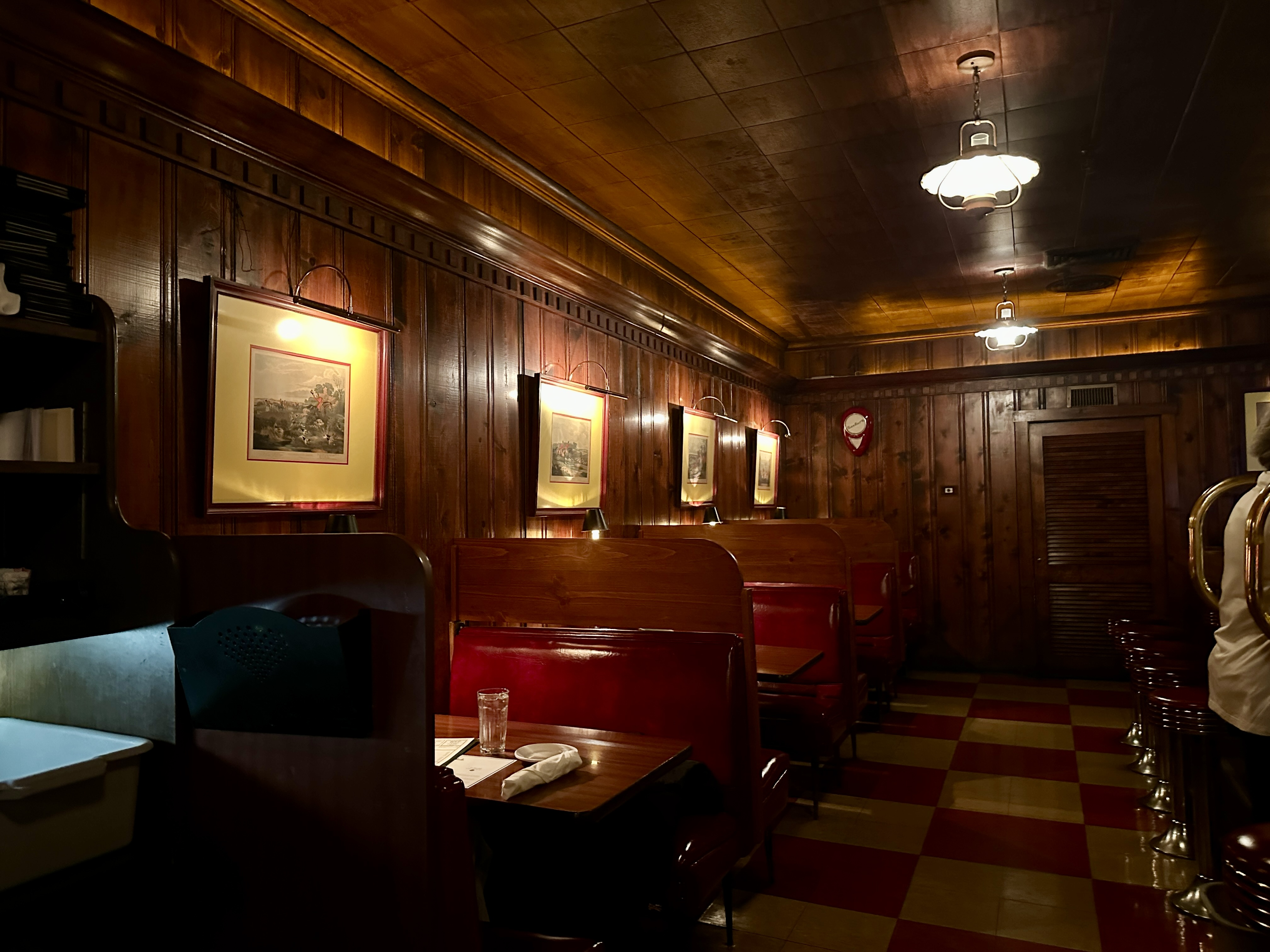
Bar seating

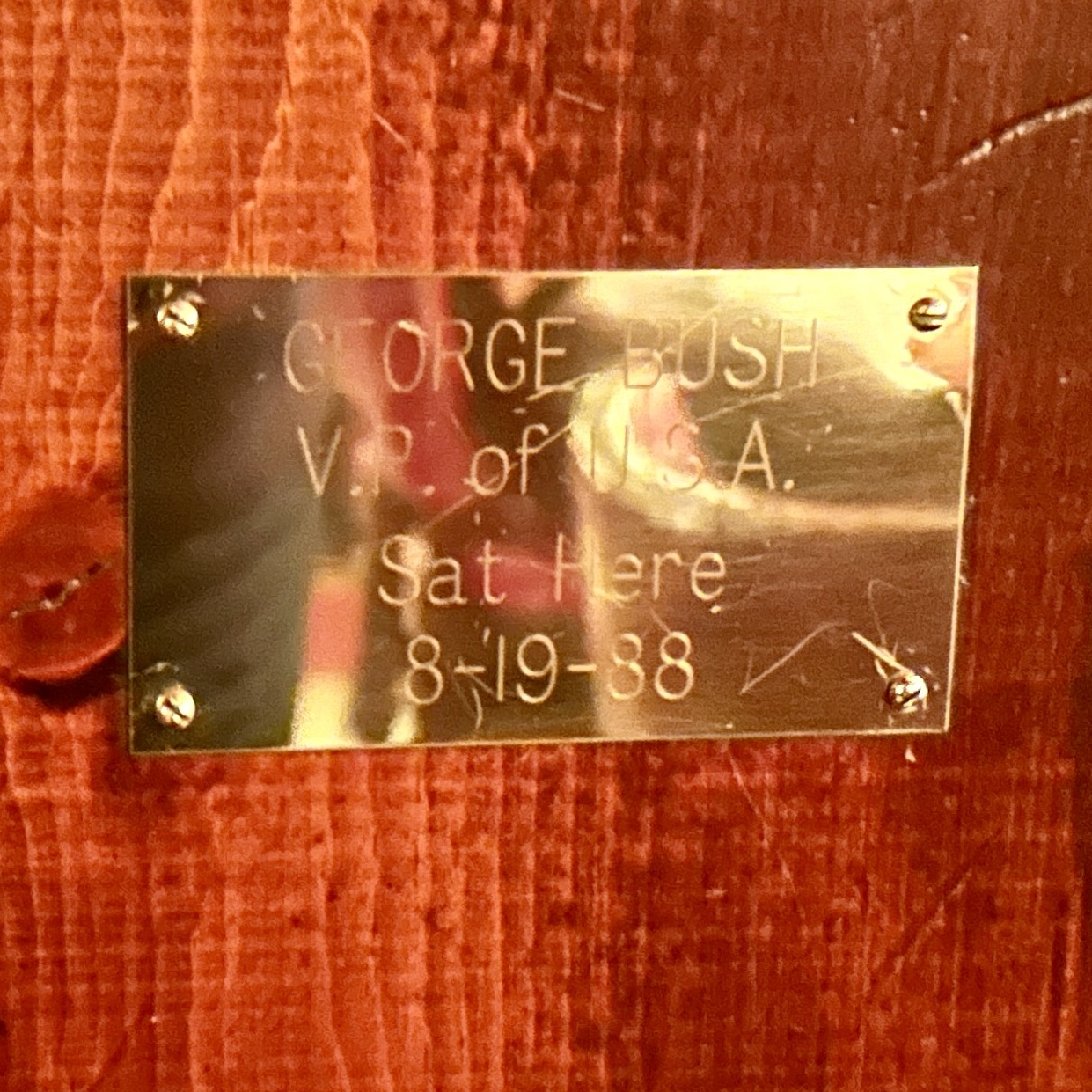
Plaque commemorating visit by George W. and Barbara Bush

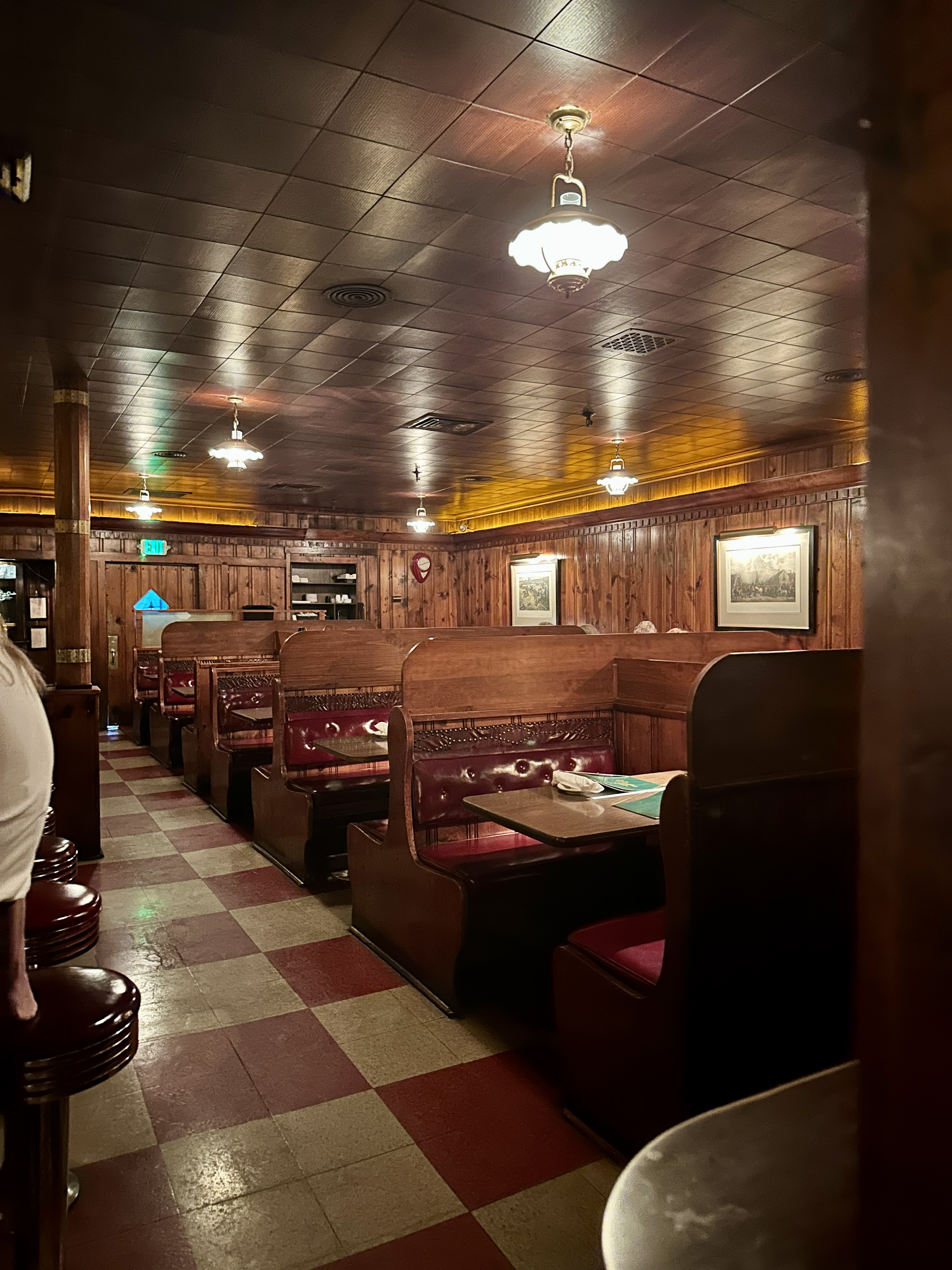
Bar seating
