= Maredo =

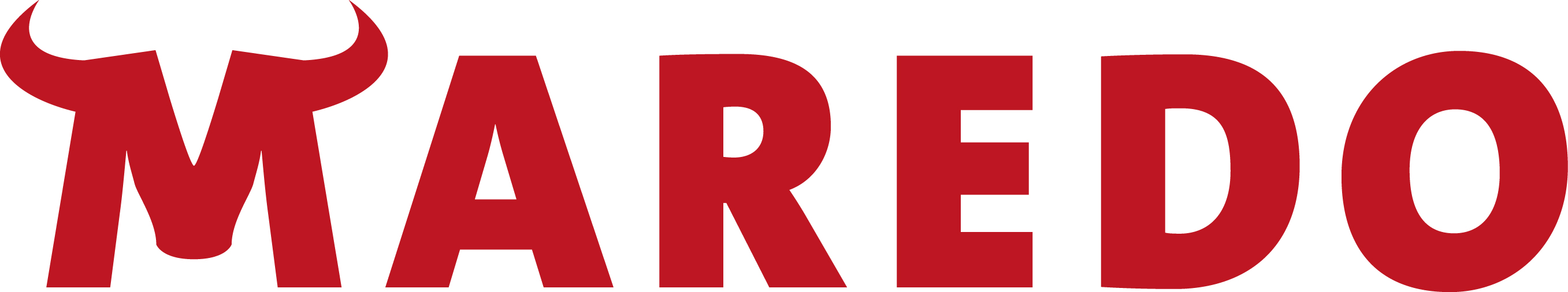

Restaurant information
- Established: 1973; 53 years ago
- Food type: Steaks and Salad
- Location: Germany, Austria

Maredo Restaurants Holding GmbH is a German restaurant chain, specialized in steaks, which was founded in 1973.

The name MAREDO is a portmanteau of the founder's names: Manfred Holl, Karl-Heinz Reinheimer, and Udo Schlote.

The company is based in Schmallenberg (North Rhine-Westphalia) and was responsible for over 40 restaurants in Germany and two in Austria. Maredo was the leading branch in German steak house chains which employed over 1500 people and is widely known for its South American steaks and salad buffet.
