= Ox (Portland restaurant) =

Steakhouse in Portland, Oregon, U.S.

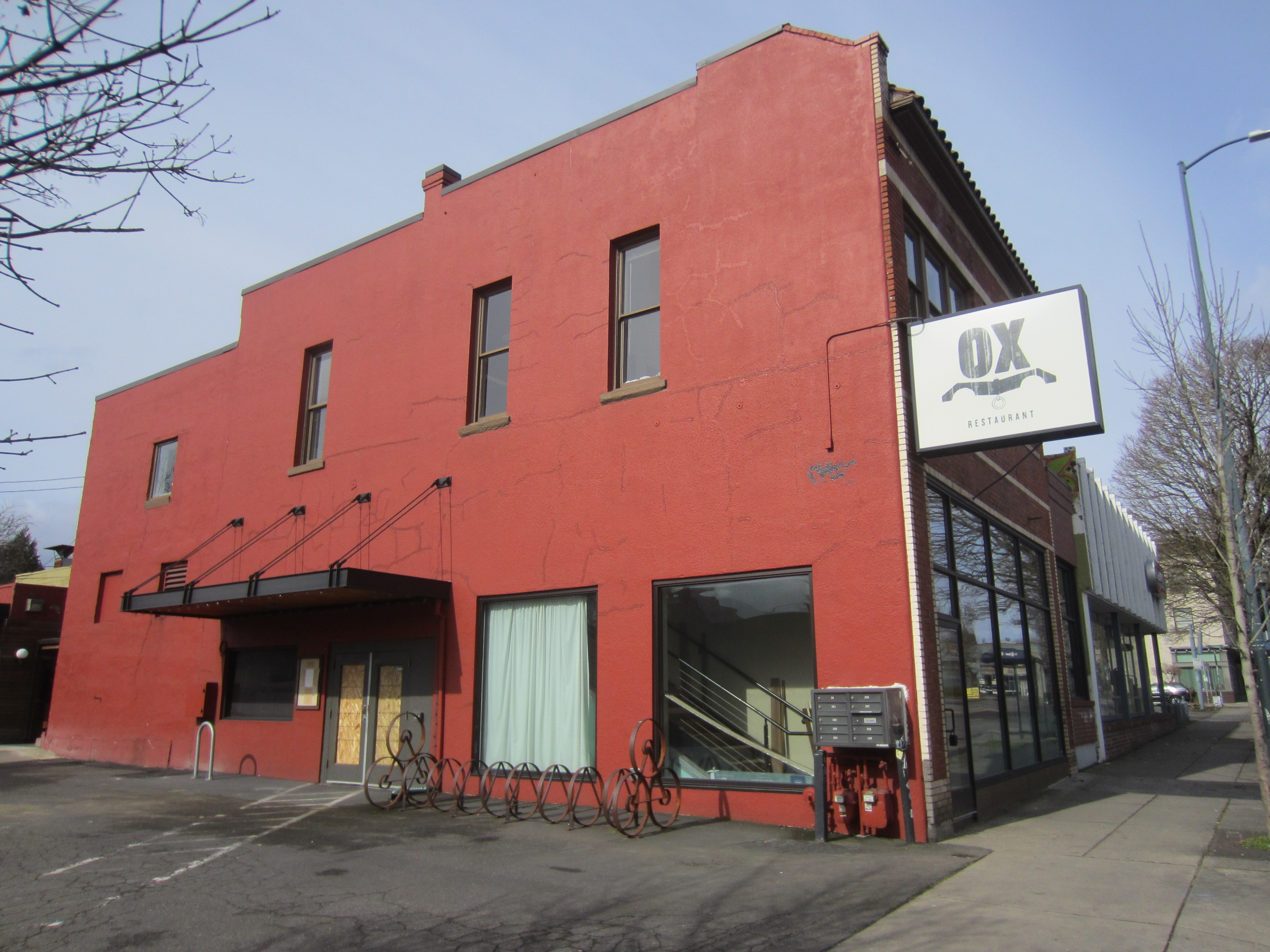
- The restaurant's exterior in 2021
- Interactive map of Ox

Restaurant information
- Established: 2012
- Food type: Argentine
- Location: 2225 Northeast Martin Luther King Jr Boulevard, Portland, Multomah, Oregon, 97212, United States
- Coordinates: 45.5394°N 122.6619°W
- Website: oxpdx.com

Ox is an Argentine steakhouse in Portland, Oregon's Eliot neighborhood, in the United States.

== History ==
Greg and Gabrielle Denton opened Ox in 2012. A "spillover space" called Whey Bar opened later in the year.

In 2015, a ventilation malfunction filled Ox with smoke and forced an evacuation. The restaurant released a cookbook in 2016. Ox began taking reservations in 2019. Kurt Huffman owns at least a 20 percent stake in the restaurant, as of 2020.

In 2026, Ox was among local restaurants, community organizations, and other businesses that joined the "We Are Rip City" campaign in support of the Moda Center renovation project.

== Reception ==
Ox was named Restaurant of the Year by The Oregonian in 2013. Michael Russell ranked the business number 6 in the newspaper's 2025 list of Portland's 40 best restaurants.

Ox received honorable mention in the Best Restaurant, Best SteakHouse, and Best Chowder categories in Willamette Week's annual "Best of Portland Readers' Poll" in 2015. The restaurant ranked third in the Best Steak House category in 2017.

The Dentons were nominated for Portland's Chef of the Year by Eater Portland's Eater Awards in 2016. The duo won in the Best Chef Northwest category by the James Beard Foundation Awards in 2017. Brooke Jackson-Glidden included the smoked bone marrow clam chowder in Eater Portland's 2024 overview of "iconic" Portland dishes. Katherine Chew Hamilton and Jackson-Glidden included Ox in the website's 2025 list of the city's best restaurants and food cart pods for large groups.

Ox ranked number 22 on Yelp's list of the 25 best steakhouses in the nation. It was included in The New York Times's 2025 list of the 25 best restaurants in Portland. Hannah Wallace included the business in Condé Nast Traveler's 2025 list of Portland's 23 best restaurants.

== See also ==
- Argentine cuisine
- Hispanics and Latinos in Portland, Oregon
- James Beard Foundation Award: 2010s
