= Opal's Steak House =

- U.S. National Register of Historic Places
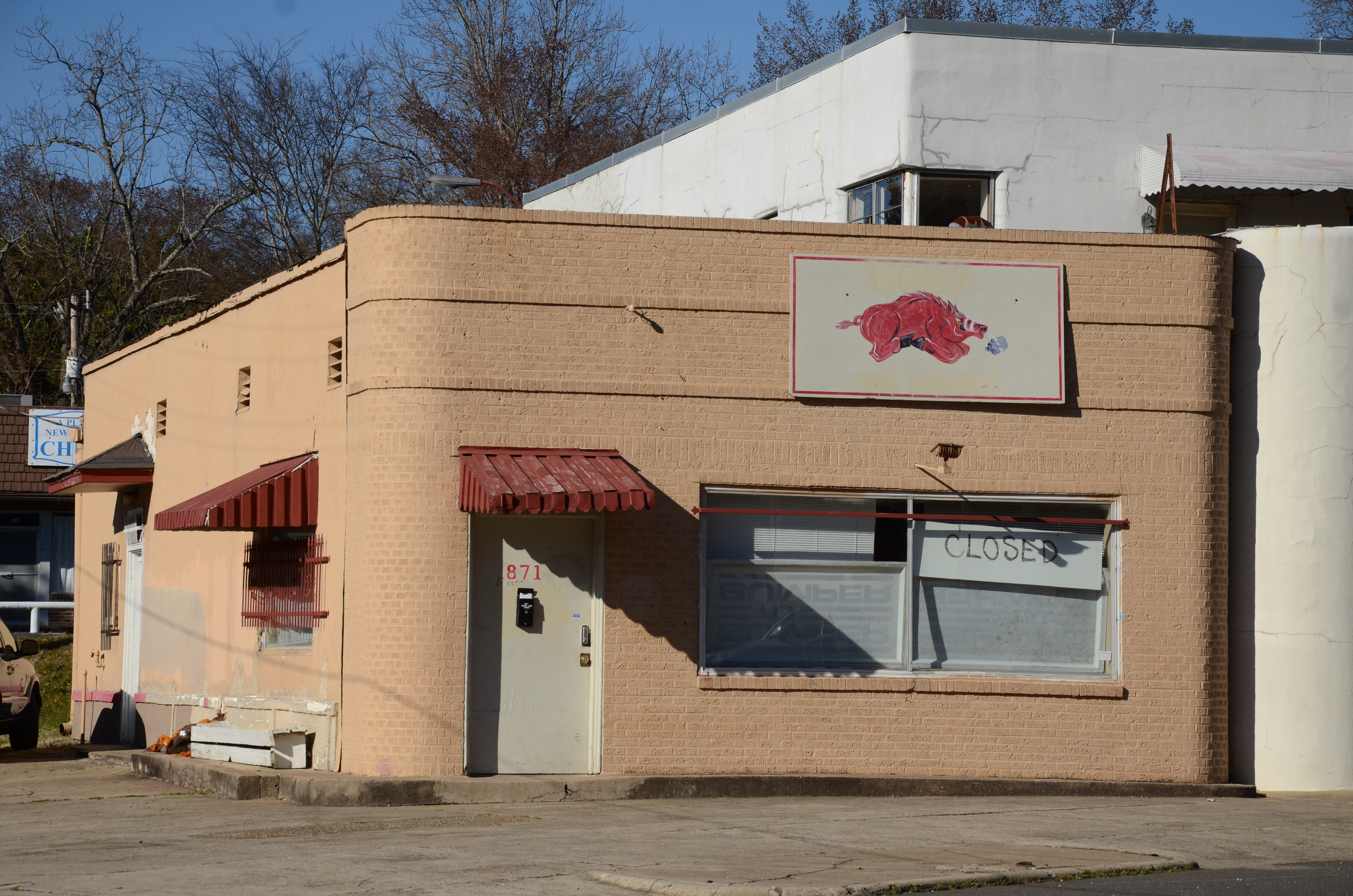

- Location within Arkansas Location within the United States
- Location: 871 Park Ave., Hot Springs, Arkansas
- Coordinates: 34°31′47″N 93°2′56″W
- Area: less than one acre
- Built: c. 1948
- Architectural style: Art Moderne
- MPS: Arkansas Highway History and Architecture MPS
- NRHP reference No.: 04000011
- Added to NRHP: February 11, 2004

Opal's Steak House is a historic building located at 871 Park Avenue in Hot Springs, Arkansas. Opal's Steak House was constructed between 1946 and 1948 to serve tourists visiting the thermal springs in Hot Springs; its location on Park Avenue served travelers on nearby U.S. Route 70, the main highway between Little Rock and Hot Springs. The building was constructed in the Art Moderne style, which is visible in its curved stucco facade and horizontal features. In 1952, the restaurant changed its name to the Golden Drumstick Restaurant; the building has since served as a clothing store, a furniture store, and a laundromat. The building was added to the National Register of Historic Places on February 11, 2004.
