= SW Steakhouse =

Restaurant information
- Established: 2005
- Location: 131 Las Vegas Blvd S, Las Vegas, Nevada
- Reservations: Yes
- Other locations: Macau
- Website: https://www.wynnlasvegas.com/dining/fine-dining/sw-steakhouse

SW Steakhouse is a “reimagined” traditional steakhouse restaurant at Wynn Las Vegas on the Las Vegas Strip, overlooking the Lake of Dreams. Opened at Wynn Las Vegas in 2005, the restaurant is noted for unique steaks and caviar service. 2008 James Beard Foundation Award semifinalist Mark LoRusso serves as executive chef. A sister restaurant at Wynn Palace, Macau, opened in 2017; it is a Michelin Guide selection.

== History ==
=== Las Vegas ===
SW Steakhouse opened at Wynn Las Vegas’s grand opening in May 2005. Along with Wing Lei, it is one of the original restaurants still operating within the resort. Mark LoRusso was named executive chef in 2021, following stints as executive chef at Botero, Tableau, and Michael Mina’s Aqua. He previously worked alongside Thomas Keller at Checkers Hotel.

=== Macau ===
In Macau, SW Steakhouse at Wynn Palace opened in 2017. Executive chef Helder Sequeira Amaral of Portugal leads the restaurant.

== Design ==
The restaurant at Wynn Las Vegas overlooks the Lake of Dreams, with outdoor terraced dining available. SW Steakhouse was last renovated in 2025. The restaurant’s refresh, led by Wynn Design & Development, was described as "warm and sophisticated" in its allusions to the refinement of a vintage ocean liner; a review notes the unique indoor-outdoor feel, and remark that "it's easy to be hypnotized by the 90-foot waterfall." The updated bar includes circular alabaster rings and counter-height tables and the restaurant continues Wynn's curated art program.

The outdoor seating overlooks the Lake of Dreams evening entertainment.

== Cuisine ==
In 2025, Las Vegas’s SW Steakhouse began sourcing "Yonezawa Gyu Oguni beef from the Watanabe Farm in the Yamagata Prefecture." Chowhound also notes that SW Steakhouse "also offers Hokkaido Snow beef from the Tomakomai Prefecture and a carefully curated selection of American Wagyu from farms in Idaho and Wyoming." A review notes that SW Steakhouse's "Japanese Wagyu offerings are among the most refined in the city."

In Las Vegas, Conde Nast notes that "all the heavy-hitting wine regions" are represented in the wine list, and that the cocktail menu consists of "classics like martinis, Manhattans, and other whiskey concoctions."

== Reception ==
Wynn Las Vegas’s SW Steakhouse has received 4 stars from the Forbes Travel Guide every year consecutively since 2014.

In Las Vegas, Chowhound "raves about the exclusive Wagyu, Chef Mark LoRusso's other incredible dishes, and the sophisticated and modern yet warm and welcoming atmosphere." Neon notes the bread as a highlight. SW Steakhouse at Wynn has been named to lists of the most romantic restaurants in Las Vegas, best steakhouses in the Las Vegas Valley, toughest reservations on the Strip, and highest grossing restaurants in the United States.

The Wynn Palace Cotai outpost "brings quality meat and seafood along with a side of unorthodox cabaret," according to Forbes Travel Guide.
