= Taylor's Steakhouse =

Steakhouse in California

- The restaurant's interior in 2008

- Location within the Los Angeles metropolitan area Location within California Location within the United States

Restaurant information
- Established: 1953
- Owner: Bruce Taylor
- Food type: Steakhouse
- Location: 3361 W 8th St, Los Angeles, CA 90005
- Coordinates: 34.0578°N 118.3021°W
- Website: taylorssteakhouse.com

Taylor's Steakhouse is a steakhouse in Koreatown, Los Angeles, opened in 1953. It is known for its coulotte steak. Taylor's opened another location in La Cañada Flintridge in 1996.

== Description ==
The restaurant's original location contains red Naugahyde horseshoe booths amongst an "old world" setting. Each table has a white tablecloth with a candle in the center. Its La Cañada Flintridge location has an outdoor patio and a wine room; it is decorated with cushioned booths, oil paintings, dark wooden paneling, USC merch, and dim lighting with the theming of an old-school steakhouse.

Taylor's offers special occasion steaks, such as coulotte steak and Kansas City rib eye. Other popular menu itmes include the prime rib, steak stroganoff, London broil, filet Oscar, French onion soup, and shrimp scampi. The Molly salad, named after a former waitress, is a wedge of iceberg lettuce that has been dressed with tomatoes, onions, and blue cheese. The restaurant has been supplied by Newport Meat since the 1980s. Seafood is a popular choice at the restaurant; in 2026, it was reported at about 35% of Taylor's sales came from it. In c. 2018, Taylor's bought a wood smoker from Kansas City and began using it to serve brisket and pork ribs.

== History ==
Taylor's Steakhouse was founded in 1953, after Horace "Tex" and Marjorie "Margie" Taylor, who were originally from Texas, bought O'Kelley's Tavern on the corner of Olympic Boulevard and Western Avenue. Tex was originally a thoroughbred horse breeder and trainer and became the first individual breeder to produce two horses that competed in the same Kentucky Derby; he was also a renowned sprinter, holding the Texas state high school record for the 440 yd (400 m) dash for 19 years. He later attended USC on a track scholarship and trained under Dean Cromwell, running the 440 ad mile relay and helping USC win the track national championship all four years of his time in college. The restaurant was initially called Taylor's Tavern and was dubbed the "Biggest Little Bar in Los Angeles."

In 1970, as the restaurant grew in popularity, the Taylors relocated a few blocks to their current location on 8th Street and Ardmore Avenue, by this time renaming themselves to Taylor's Prime Steaks. Tex and Margie retired to Solana Beach in 1978 and the business was taken over by their son, Bruce. A second location, in La Cañada Flintridge, opened in March 1996 and was remodeled in 2009.
