= Steakhouse =

Restaurant specializing in steaks

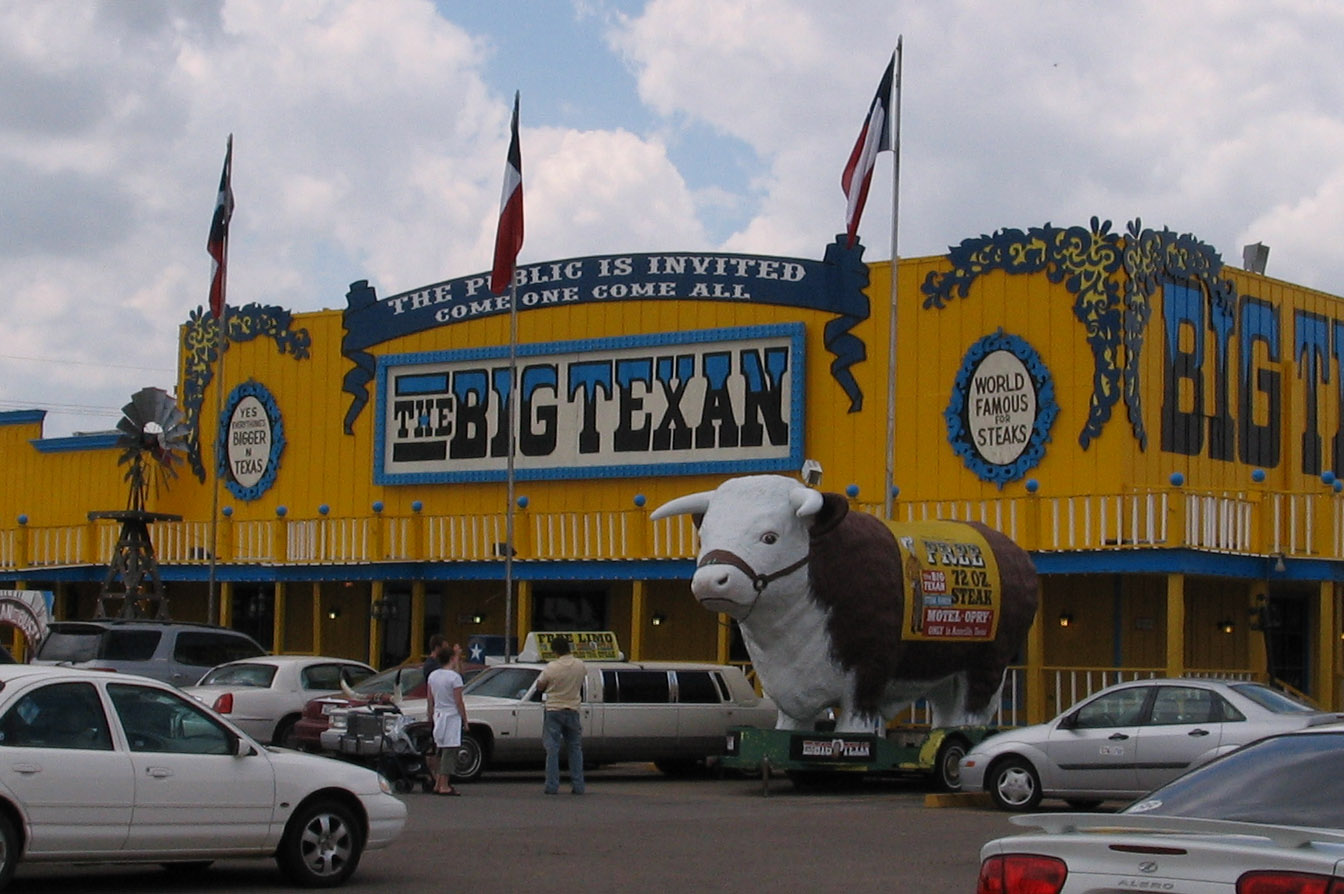
The Big Texan Steak Ranch in Amarillo, Texas

A steakhouse, steak house, or chophouse is a restaurant that specializes in steaks and chops. Modern steakhouses may also carry other cuts of meat including poultry, roast prime rib, and veal, as well as fish and other seafood.

== History ==
=== British chophouses ===
Chophouses started in London in the 1690s and served individual portions of meat, known as chops. Their menus were traditionally centred on simply prepared meat dishes. Many establishments retained their established culinary practices during the nineteenth century, even as continental European cooking became increasingly fashionable in Britain. Historically, some London chophouses primarily served male customers and developed associations with commercial and professional dining. Until closing in 2022, the oldest chophouse in London, Simpson's Tavern was regarded as an institution, and retained its 19th century decor.

=== Development in the United States ===
Steakhouses developed in the United States during the nineteenth century, partly from inns, taverns and urban chophouses. Beefsteaks and mutton chops were served in establishments catering to workers, merchants and other urban diners.

In New York City, Cobweb Hall, operated by David Pattullo, was known for serving mutton chops alongside beefsteaks, lamb kidneys, bacon and potatoes. The oldest continuously operating steakhouse in the United States is the Old Homestead Steakhouse in Manhattan, New York City, established in 1868. Other long-established restaurants contributed to the development of American steakhouse dining. Keens, which opened in New York City in 1885 as an English-style chophouse, became particularly associated with mutton chops. Cattlemen's Steakhouse, established in Oklahoma City in 1910, developed alongside the city's livestock and meatpacking trade.

=== Brazilian churrascarias ===
In Brazil, a churrascaria is a restaurant specialising in churrasco, or grilled meat. Although churrascarias share the steakhouse emphasis on meat, their menus and serving practices may differ from those of traditional American steakhouses. Some churrascarias use rodízio service, in which servers bring different cuts of meat to diners' tables, often on skewers, and carve portions directly onto their plates. Brazilian-style steakhouses have also opened in markets outside Brazil, introducing churrasco and rodízio service to international diners.

=== Expansion of restaurant chains ===
During the second half of the twentieth century, steakhouse chains expanded the restaurant format into additional American markets and internationally. Ruth Fertel purchased Chris Steak House in New Orleans in 1965. After a fire forced the restaurant to relocate in 1976, it adopted the name Ruth's Chris Steak House. The business expanded through company-operated restaurants and franchising.

Morton's The Steakhouse was established in Chicago in 1978 by Arnie Morton and Klaus Fritsch and subsequently expanded into a multi-location restaurant chain. The growth of steakhouse chains helped bring a standardised version of the restaurant format to multiple locations, while independent establishments continued to operate with their own menus, service practices and culinary traditions. Today, steakhouses are found throughout the US and Canada.

== Menu, Preparation and service ==
Beef is the central feature of the traditional steakhouse menu. Common steak cuts include ribeye, strip steak, tenderloin or filet mignon, T-bone and porterhouse. Some establishments also serve skirt steak, flat iron steak, picanha and other cuts. Steaks differ in their tenderness, marbling, flavour and proportion of bone. Restaurants may offer different portion sizes, including larger cuts intended for sharing. Other main courses may include prime rib, lamb chops, pork chops, chicken and seafood. The range of non-beef dishes varies between establishments.

Traditional steakhouses generally emphasise established beef cuts, familiar side dishes and conventional table service. Some retain historical dining-room designs and longstanding menu items. Casual steakhouses offer steak-focused menus in less formal settings, often alongside a wider selection of other main courses.Fine-dining steakhouses may emphasise premium beef, specialised cooking equipment, wine service and more elaborate dining-room service.

Steakhouses prepare steaks using several cooking techniques, including grilling, broiling and pan-searing. High-temperature cooking is commonly used to brown the surface of the meat while allowing the interior to be cooked to the requested degree of doneness. Some steakhouses use specialised high-temperature broilers. Infrared broiling equipment was adopted by several prominent American steakhouses during the late twentieth century. Steaks are commonly offered according to degrees of doneness, such as rare, medium-rare, medium, medium-well and well-done.

== See also ==
- Café de Paris sauce
- Churrascaria
- List of steakhouses
- Seafood restaurant
- Steak frites
