= Cracker Barrel =

American restaurant company

CBOCS Properties, Inc.
- Cracker Barrel's "Uncle Herschel" logo used since 2015
- Trade name: Cracker Barrel
- Type: Public
- Traded as: Nasdaq: CBRL; S&P 600 component
- ISIN: US22410J1060
- Industry: Restaurants
- Founded: September 19, 1969; 57 years ago
- Founder: Dan Evins
- Headquarters: Lebanon, Tennessee, U.S.
- Number of locations: 657 (2025)
- Area served: United States
- Key people: Carl Berquist (chairman); David Deno (president and CEO)
- Products: Southern Cuisine (breakfast foods • seafood • chicken platters • dumplings • steaks • kids menu • pork dishes • salads • sandwiches • beef platters • desserts)
- Services: Food; General store
- Revenue: ▲US$3.48 billion (2025)
- Operating income: ▲US$55 million (2025)
- Net income: ▲US$46 million (2025)
- Total assets: ▲US$2.16 billion (2025)
- Total equity: ▲US$462 million (2025)
- Number of employees: 76,730 (2025)
- Subsidiaries: Logan's Roadhouse (1999–2006); Rocking Chair, Inc. (2002–present); Maple Street Biscuit Company (2019–present)
- Website: crackerbarrel.com
- Footnotes; Financials as of August 1, 2025.

CBOCS Properties, Inc., doing business as Cracker Barrel, is an American chain of restaurant and gift stores with a Southern country theme. The company's headquarters are in Lebanon, Tennessee, where Cracker Barrel was founded by Dan Evins and Tommy Lowe in 1969. The chain's early locations were positioned near Interstate Highway exits in the Southeastern and Midwestern United States, but expanded across the country during the 1990s and 2000s. As of August 10, 2023, the company operates 660 stores in 44 states.

Cracker Barrel's menu is based on traditional Southern cuisine, with appearance and decor designed to resemble an old-fashioned general store. Each location features a front porch lined with wooden rocking chairs, a stone fireplace, and decorative artifacts from the local area. Cracker Barrel partners with country music performers. It engages in charitable activities, such as having given assistance to those impacted by Hurricane Katrina and also to injured war veterans.

== History ==
=== Founding: 1969–1980 ===
Cracker Barrel was founded in 1969 by Dan Evins, a representative for Shell Oil, who developed the restaurant and gift store concept initially as a plan to improve gasoline sales. Designed to resemble the traditional country store that he remembered from his childhood, with a name chosen to give it a Southern country theme, Cracker Barrel was intended to attract the interest of highway travelers. Multiple origin stories of the name exists. From the 1760s onward, Scots-Irish settlers of the southern backcountry were called crackers. Barrels of soda crackers could be found for sale in small-town stores across the American South in the early 1900s; people would stand around the barrels chatting and catching up, similar in purpose to contemporary office water coolers.

The first restaurant was built close to Interstate 40, just outside Lebanon on the Gallatin Highway 109 exit in Tennessee. It opened on September 19, 1969, serving Southern cuisine including biscuits, grits, country ham, and turnip greens.

Evins incorporated Cracker Barrel in February 1970 and soon opened more locations. In the early 1970s, the firm leased land on gasoline station sites near interstate highways to build restaurants. The early locations all featured gas pumps on-site; during gasoline shortages in the mid to late 1970s, the firm began to build restaurants without pumps.

Since 1977, Cracker Barrel has incorporated a logo featuring "Uncle Herschel" (colloquially known as "Old Timer"), an illustration of a man resembling company founder Dan Evins' real-life uncle, Herschel McCartney.

=== 1981–1996 ===
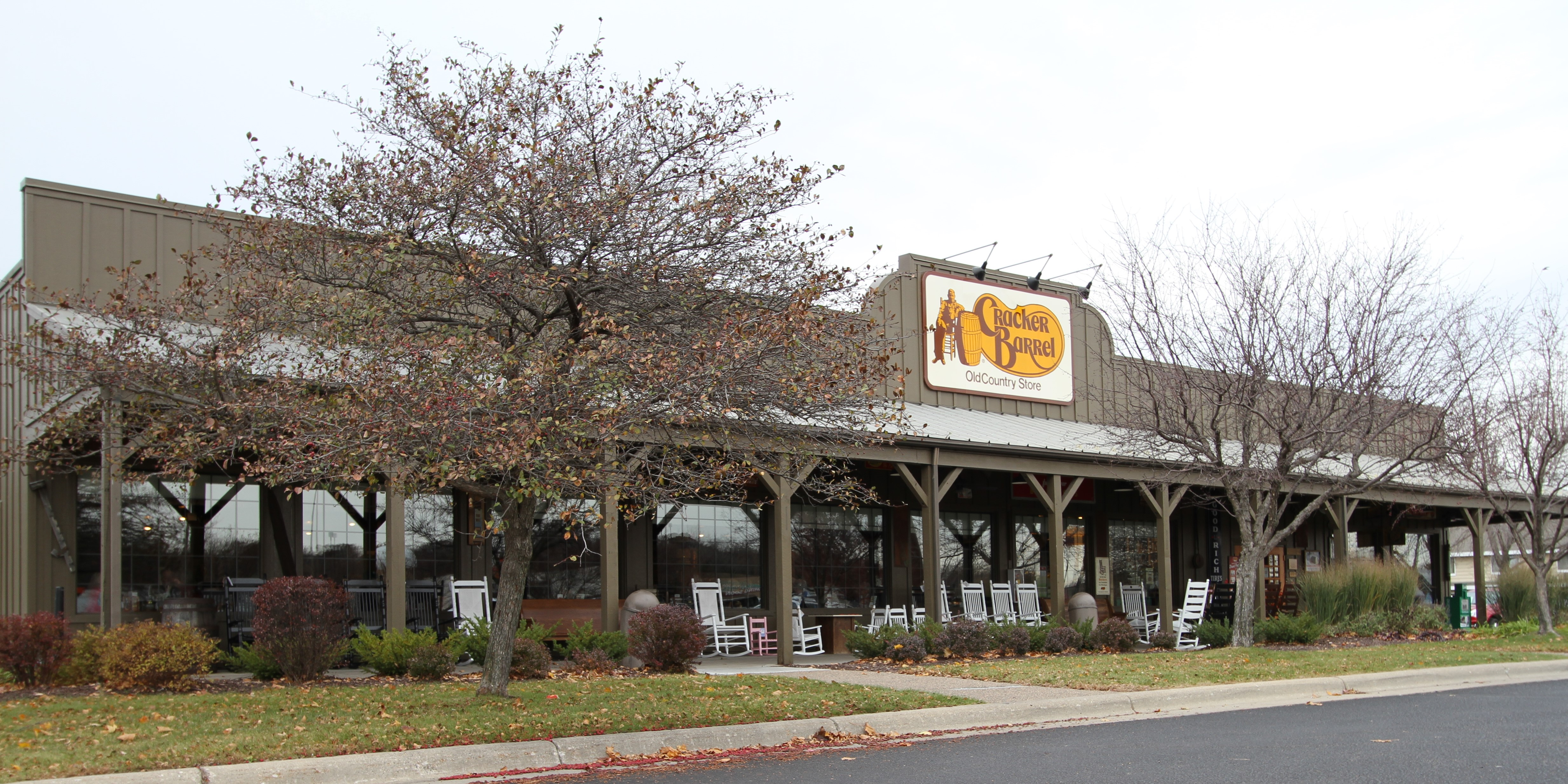
Location in Burnsville, Minnesota

Cracker Barrel became a publicly traded company in 1981 to raise funds for further expansion. It floated more than half a million shares, raising $10.6 million. Following the initial public offering, Cracker Barrel grew at a rate of around 20 percent per year; by 1987, the company had become a chain of more than 50 units in eight states, with annual net sales of almost $81 million. The company grew consistently through the 1980s and 1990s, attaining a $1 billion market value by 1992. In 1993, the chain's revenue was nearly twice that of any other family restaurant.

In 1994, the chain tested a carry-out-only store, Cracker Barrel Old Country Store Corner Market, in suburban residential neighborhoods. In addition, it expanded into new markets through the establishment of more traditional Cracker Barrel locations, the majority of them outside the South, and tested alterations to its menus to adapt to new regions. The chain added regional dishes to its menus, including eggs and salsa in Texas and Reuben sandwiches in New York, but continued to offer its original menu items in all restaurants. Cracker Barrel did not close any locations until 1995, when a location on American Way in Memphis, Tennessee was closed due to it no longer meeting the company's standards.

=== 1997–2010 ===
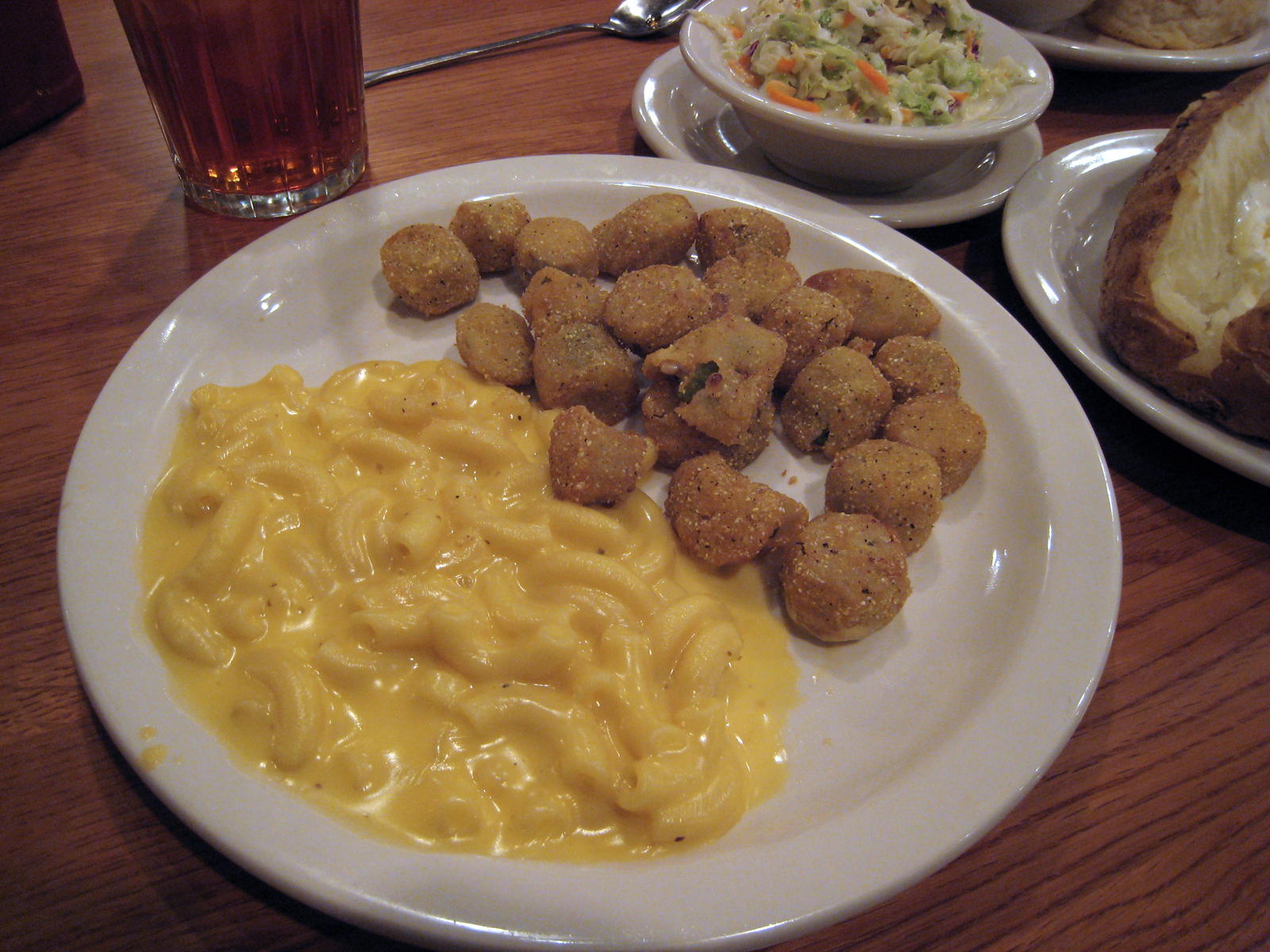
Mac n' cheese and fried okra served at a Cracker Barrel in Yuma, Arizona, November 2007

By September 1997, Cracker Barrel had 314 restaurants, and aimed to increase the number of stores by approximately 50 per year over the following five years. The firm closed its Corner Market operations in 1997 and refocused on its restaurant and gift store locations. The company's president, Ron Magruder, stated that the chain was concentrating on strengthening its core theme, offering traditional foods and retail in a country store setting, with good service and country music. The number of combined restaurants and stores owned by Cracker Barrel increased between 1997 and 2000, to more than 420 locations. In 2000 and 2001, the company addressed staffing and infrastructure issues related to this rapid growth by implementing a more rigorous recruitment strategy and introducing new technology, including an order-placement system. Also in 1997, the company purchased the Mitchell House in Lebanon, Tennessee. The house had been the elementary dormitory and school for Castle Heights Military Academy which both Dan Evins and his son attended. The school had closed in 1986 and the building had sat empty since then. Cracker Barrel spent two million dollars to restore the home and used it as its corporate headquarters from 1999 to 2013.

The company was criticized for anti-LGBT policies in the 1990s, which it reversed in response to backlash from the public and shareholders. In the early 2000s, Cracker Barrel was the subject of several civil rights lawsuits and a U.S. Justice Department investigation, all of which were settled. Cracker Barrel licensed products are sold in grocery stores under the name "CB Old Country Store" after a 2013 trademark-infringement lawsuit was brought by Kraft Foods, which sells cheese under the brand name Cracker Barrel.

From the late 1990s to the mid-2000s, the company focused on opening new locations in residential areas to attract local residents and workers as customers. The chain opened its first restaurant and gift store not located near a highway in 1998, in Dothan, Alabama. In the 2000s, in the wake of incidents including charges of racial discrimination and controversy over its policy of firing gay employees, the firm launched a series of promotional activities including a nationwide book drive and a sweepstakes with trips to the Country Music Association Awards and rocking chairs among the prizes. It updated its marketing in 2006 to encourage new customers, changing the design of its highway billboard advertisements to include images of menu items. Previously the signs had featured only the company's logo.

=== 2011–present ===
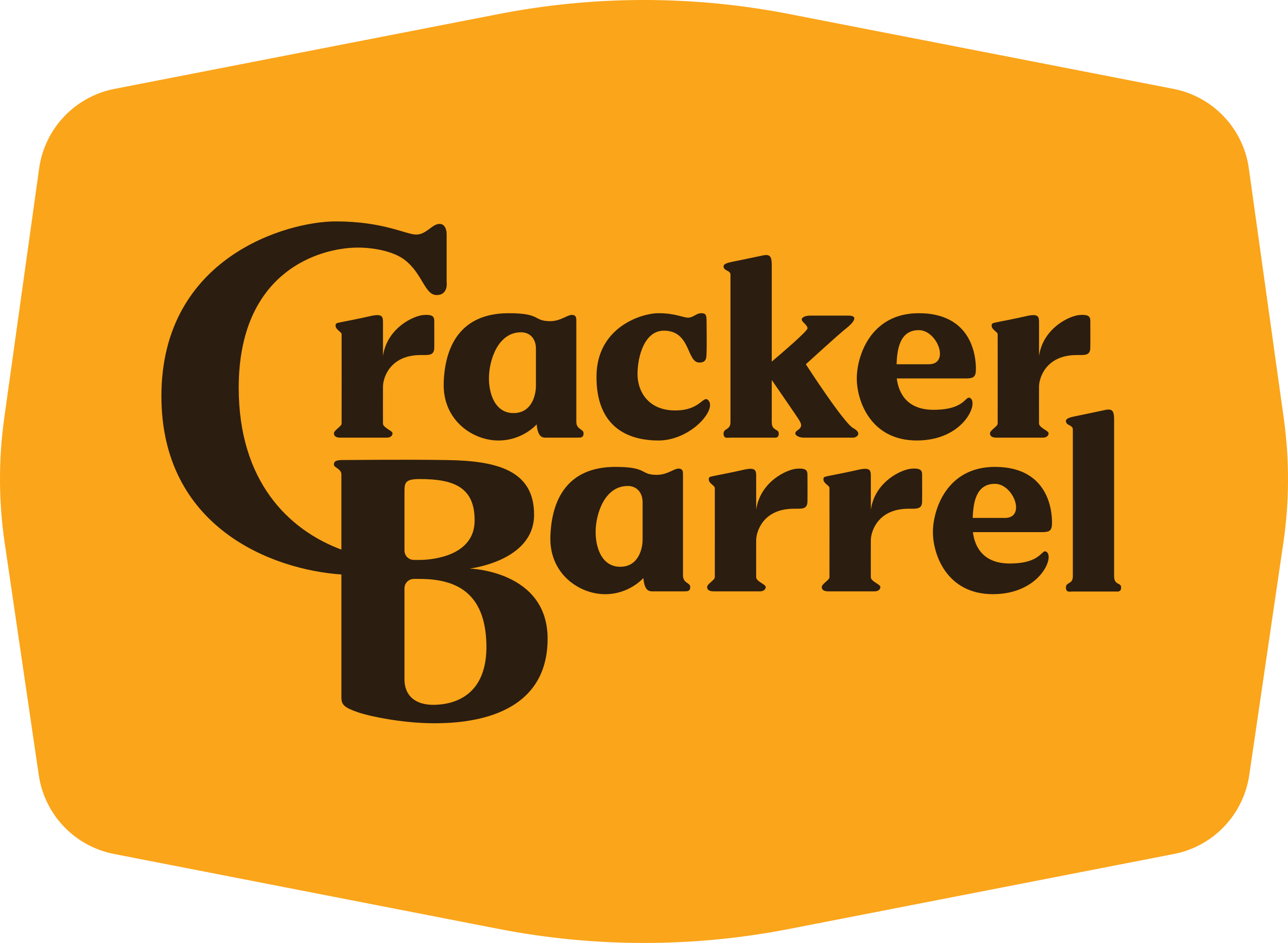
Cracker Barrel's simplified logo used from August 19 to 26, 2025

By 2011, Cracker Barrel had opened more than 600 restaurants in 42 states. The company has since begun expansion to the West Coast: in 2017, their first store in the region opened in Tualatin, Oregon, and their first store in California was opened the next year in Victorville. In 2019 Cracker Barrel purchased Maple Street Biscuit Company for $36 million cash.

Cracker Barrel partnered with DoorDash in 2020, in response to restaurant closures due to the COVID-19 pandemic. It was the restaurant's first partnership with a delivery service. Cracker Barrel permanently added alcohol to its menu for the first time in September 2020. The company began testing a limited selection of beer, wine and mimosas at 100 stores in early 2020 before announcing that it would expand the offerings to over 600 of its locations after receiving a positive response from its customers. In Q2 2023, the company reported $933.9 million in revenues; takeout, delivery, and catering made up 23% of sales. In May 2024, Cracker Barrel revealed that 16% of their customer base had not returned since 2020.

In August 2025, Cracker Barrel unveiled an updated dining room decor and a simplified logo. However, after only a week, Cracker Barrel scrapped the new logo and reverted to its previous logo following mass backlash and customer outrage due to the rebrand. Shortly thereafter, Cracker Barrel removed sections of its website dedicated to diversity and LGBT pride, calling them "out of date". In September 2025, the company also cancelled plans to remodel and modernize its restaurants after consumer feedback on just four of its 660 locations.

In January 2026, in response to shrinking budgets following the rebranding issues from the year prior, Cracker Barrel released a memo demanding its employees, when traveling for work related reasons, eat only at Cracker Barrel restaurants "for all or the majority of meals while traveling, whenever practical, based on location and schedule". This follows earlier reports in 2026 of menu items being cut without notice, including its traditional January 1 Black Eyed Pea special.

== Restaurants ==
=== Food and gift shop ===
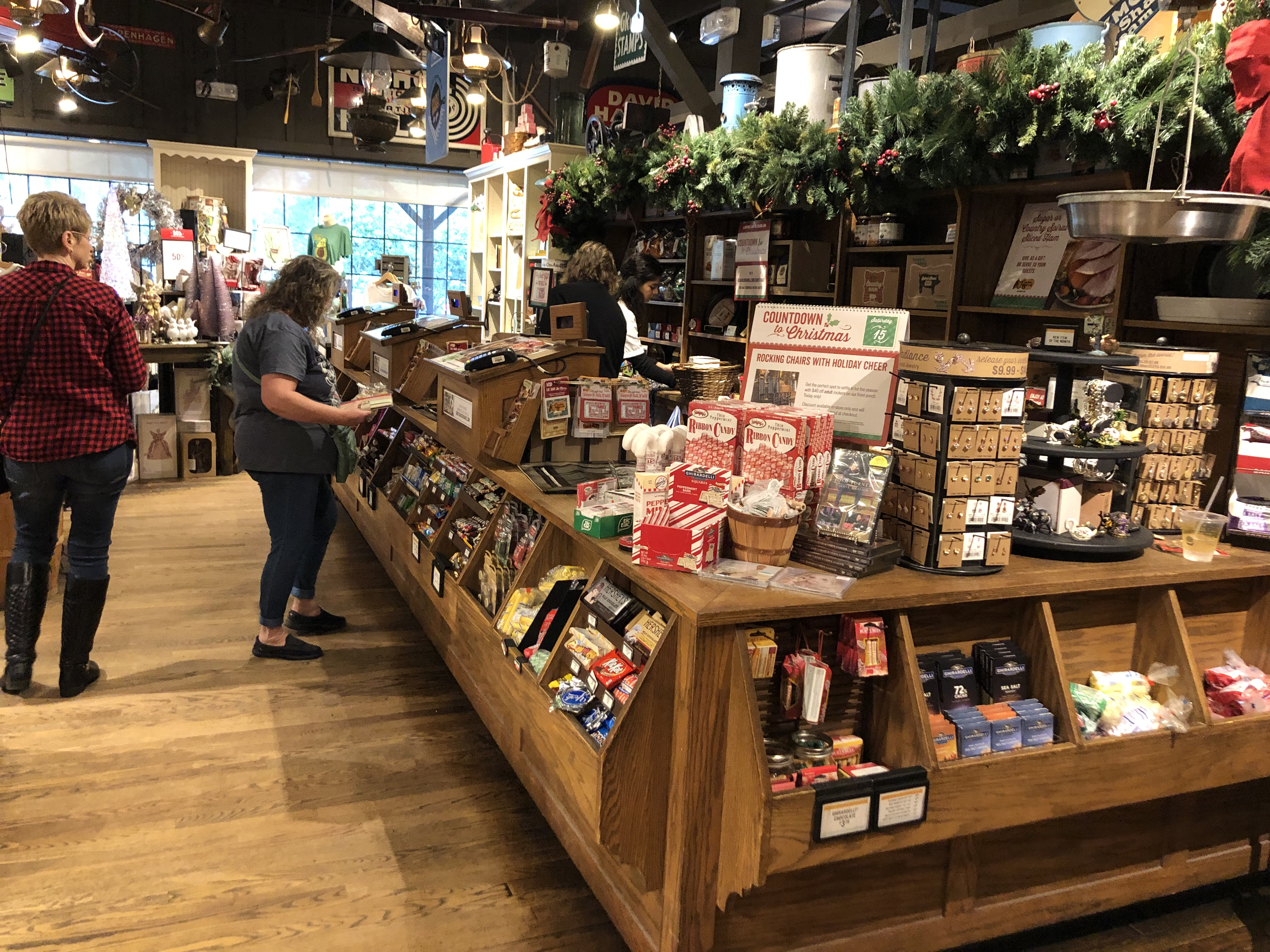
A Cracker Barrel gift shop, the "Old Country Store" in Gainesville, Florida, December 2018

As a Southern-themed chain, Cracker Barrel serves traditional Southern comfort food often described as "down-home" country cooking. Breakfast is served all day, and there are two menus: one for breakfast, the other for lunch and dinner. Since the first restaurant opened, the menu has featured Southern specialties, including biscuits, fried chicken, and catfish; seasonal and regional menu items were added during the 1980s and 1990s.

The gift shops sell gifts including simple toys representative of the 1950s and 1960s, toy vehicles, puzzles, and woodcrafts. Also sold are country music CDs, LP vinyl records, DVDs of early classic television, cookbooks, baking mixes, kitchen novelty decor, and early classic brands of candy and snack foods.

=== Locations, service, and decor ===
For much of its early history, Cracker Barrel's restaurants have been alongside the roads of the Interstate Highway System, and the majority of its restaurants are still close to interstate and other highways.

The locations are themed around the idea of a traditional Southern U.S. general store. Items used to decorate each store are authentic artifacts, including everyday objects from the early 1900s and after. Each location's exterior features a front porch lined with wooden rocking chairs, while the interiors all include five common decorations: a shotgun, a cookstove, a deer head, a telephone, and a traffic light. Every table has a wooden peg solitaire game.

The decor at each location also includes artifacts related to the local history of the area, such as antique household tools, old calendars and posters, and antique photographs. The practice began with the first location which was decorated by Lebanon, Tennessee, antique store owners Don and Kathleen Singleton. The Singletons continued to be involved in decorating subsequent stores until 1979 followed by their son, Larry Singleton, who held the role until his retirement in 2019. Items acquired by the company to be used as decorations are centrally stored in a Tennessee warehouse, where they are cleaned, restored and cataloged until needed. As of 2018, the facility held more than 90,000 items.

=== Recognition ===
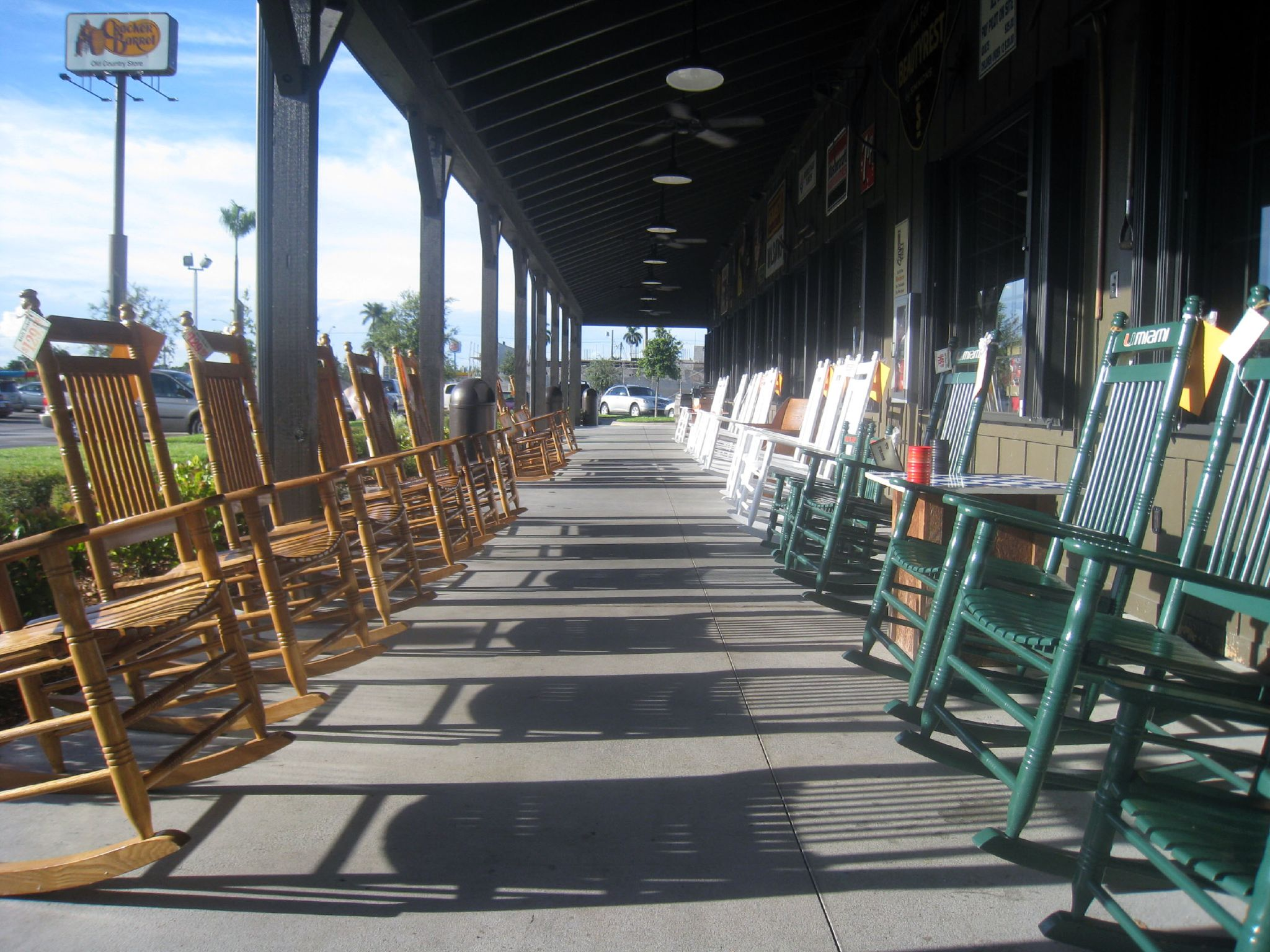
Wooden rocking chairs outside a Cracker Barrel in Florida City, Florida, August 2008

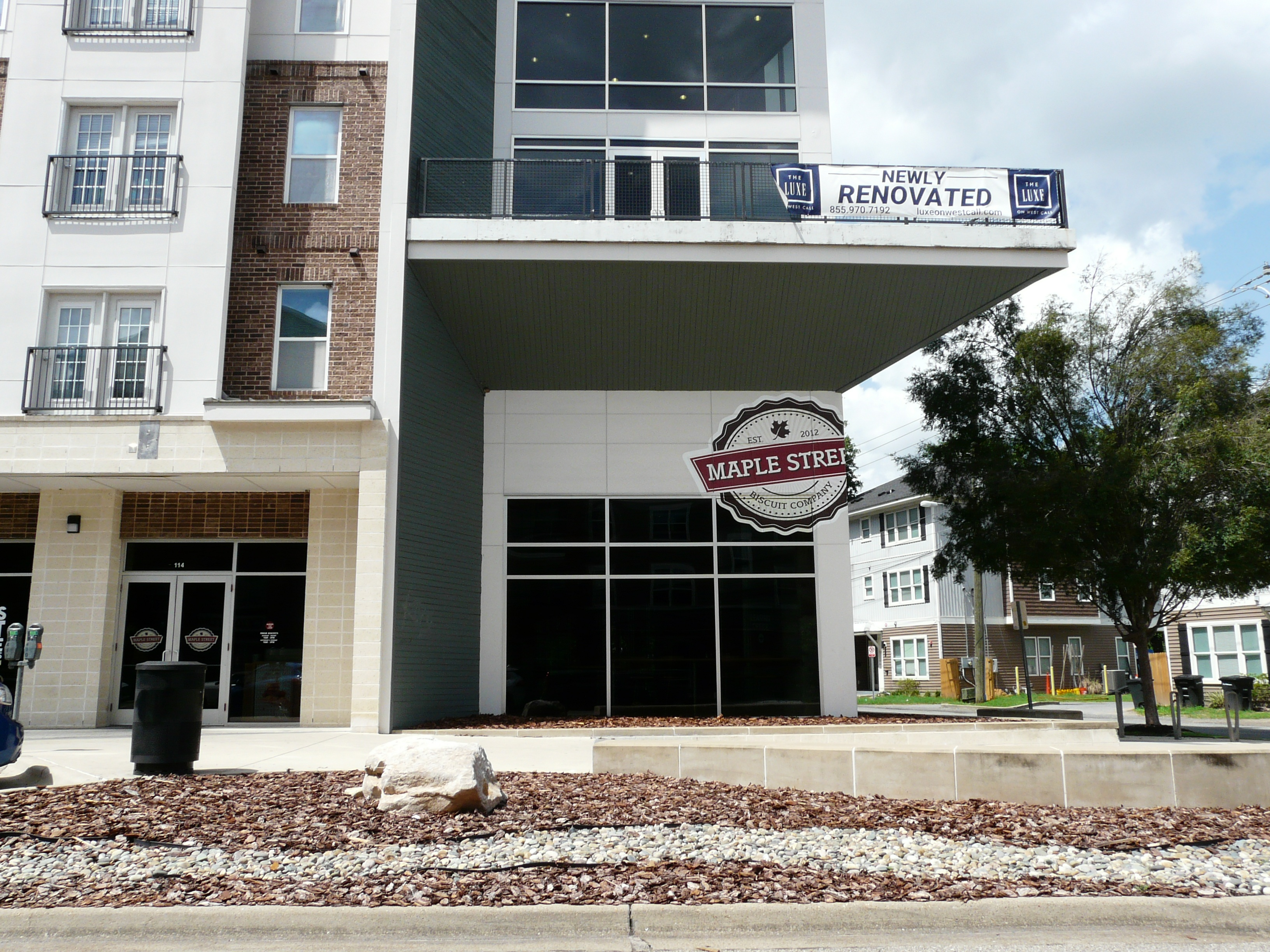
A Maple Street Biscuit Company location in Tallahassee, Florida

Destinations magazine has presented the chain with awards for best chain restaurant, and in 2010 and 2011, the Zagat restaurant survey named it the "Best Breakfast". The chain was selected by the Outdoor Advertising Association of America as the 2011 OBIE Hall of Fame Award recipient for its long-standing use of outdoor advertising. It was also named the "Best Family Dining" restaurant by a nationwide "Choice in Chains" consumer poll in Restaurants & Institutions magazine for 19 consecutive years.

=== Fans ===
Cracker Barrel is known for the loyalty of its customers, particularly travelers who are likely to spend more at restaurants than locals. From 1977 to 2017, married couple Ray and Wilma Yoder drove a combined total of more than 5 million miles (an average of 342 miles per day) to visit 644 Cracker Barrel locations. When the company opened their 645th restaurant, in Tualatin, Oregon, in August 2017 (on Ray Yoder's 81st birthday), it flew the Yoders out for the grand opening and presented them with custom aprons and rocking chairs, among other gifts.

== Corporate affairs ==
=== Leadership ===
Company founder Dan Evins led the company until 2001, when he was succeeded by Michael Woodhouse. In September 2011, Sandra B. Cochran became the company's CEO and president. Cochran was the second woman in Tennessee to hold that office in a publicly traded company. She held the position until August 2023, when Julie Felss Masino was named as Cochran's successor. In July 2026, the company announced that Ms. Masino would resign in August 2026. The company said that David Deno will succeed her as CEO.

=== Investment and business model ===
Cracker Barrel restaurants are aimed at the family and casual dining market as well as retail sales. The chain also advertises to people traveling on the interstate highways, as the majority of its locations are close to highway exits. The company has promoted its cost controls to investors. The company has stated its goals are to keep employee turnover low and to provide better trained staff. Since the 1980s, the firm has offered a formal training program with benefits for progressing through it to all of its employees.

=== Partnerships and sponsorships ===
==== NASCAR ====
Cracker Barrel has sponsored a variety of NASCAR races. From 1999 to 2001, they sponsored the Cracker Barrel Old Country Store 500 at Atlanta Motor Speedway and currently the Cracker Barrel 400 at Nashville Superspeedway since 2025.

==== Recording artists ====
Cracker Barrel has frequently collaborated with country musician Dolly Parton. The company first worked with Parton in 2009 on the collector's edition of her album Backwoods Barbie. Since then, the company has released collector's editions of other Parton albums. It also brought together Parton and the a cappella group Pentatonix to create a remix of Parton's song "Jolene", which won a Grammy Award for best country duo/group performance in 2017. Parton also performed as part of Cracker Barrel's appearance in the 2020 Macy's Thanksgiving Day Parade.

In 2009, the company worked with country musician Alan Jackson to release an album, called Songs of Love and Heartache, along with a collectible collection. In 2019, the company launched its 'Five Decades, One Voice' campaign, which highlighted female country music singers such as Loretta Lynn, Trisha Yearwood, and Brandi Carlile after a study found female country artists receive less radio time than male artists. The initiative included producing covers of classic country songs and creating all-female playlists for the company's restaurants.

In 2011, The Oak Ridge Boys recorded a 30th anniversary edition of their album "It's Only Natural" for the company. In 2020, Cracker Barrel brought together Ingrid Andress, Kimberly Schlapman, and Karen Fairchild to collaborate on a version of Andress' song "More Hearts Than Mine." Cracker Barrel is on the Corporate Advisory Board for the Texas Conference of the National Association for the Advancement of Colored People (NAACP), and is a corporate sponsor of the NAACP Leadership 500 Summit.

==== Grand Ole Opry sponsorship ====
They also sponsored the Grand Ole Opry from 2004 to 2009. The company was the first presenting sponsor of the Grand Ole Opry. This sponsorship allowed the company to make connections within the Nashville music industry, following which it entered into partnership with a number of country music performers.

==== All Elite Wrestling ====
Cracker Barrel had a partnership with American professional wrestling promotion All Elite Wrestling through tag-team wrestlers The Young Bucks, who frequently used the restaurant in skits and promos. In 2019 they became AEW's first official match sponsors for "The Cracker Barrel Clash", a triple threat match in their Pay-per-view special, All Out (2019).

=== Community involvement ===
Cracker Barrel has supported a wide range of charities through one-off donations, promotional events, and partnerships with charitable organizations. The chain has supported charities and causes in communities where its restaurants are located, including the Gulf Coast after Hurricane Katrina in 2005 and Nashville after severe flooding in 2010. In the same year, Cracker Barrel established Cracker Barrel Cares Inc., an employee-funded non-profit organization that provides support to Cracker Barrel employees. Cracker Barrel has also formed a partnership with the Wounded Warrior Project, a charity for injured veterans, as well as the nonprofit Operation Homefront to support programs for military families.

In attempts to rebuild its image after several race-related controversies, the firm has provided a scholarship through the National Black MBA Association, and job skills programs and sponsorships with 100 Black Men of America and the Restaurant and Lodging Association. In November 2021, Cracker Barrel launched an initiative called Food for Families aimed at addressing food insecurity, hunger and reducing food waste in rural and underserved communities and in middle Tennessee. This was in addition to a new partnership with the Cracker Barrel Old Country Store Foundation and Feeding America.

=== LGBTQ policies ===
In early 1991, an intra-company memo called for employees to be dismissed if they did not display "normal heterosexual values". According to news reports, at least 11 employees were fired under the policy on a store-by-store basis from locations in Georgia and other states. After demonstrations by gay rights groups, the company ended its policy in March 1991 and stated it would not discriminate based on sexual orientation. The company's founder, Dan Evins, subsequently described the policy as a mistake. From 1992 onward, the New York City Employees Retirement System, then a major shareholder, put forward proposals to add sexual orientation to the company's non-discrimination policy. An early proposal in 1993 was defeated, with 77 percent against and only 14 percent in support, along with 9 percent abstaining. It was not until 2002 that the proposals were successful; 58 percent of company shareholders voted in favor of the addition. The Cracker Barrel shareholder proposals set a precedent for the use of shareholder power to change company hiring policy.

Between 2008 and 2021, Cracker Barrel raised its rating in the Human Rights Campaign's Corporate Equality Index from 15 to 80 by adding sexual orientation non-discrimination policies and training programs. Beginning in 2016, the company adopted a pro-LGBTQ stance, developing an internal diversity council which included LGBTQ members. Since 2017, the company has sponsored Out & Equal, a workplace-equality non-profit organization.

=== Conflict with Biglari Holdings ===
Sardar Biglari purchased shares of Cracker Barrel in 2011 through his company Biglari Holdings Inc. He has been critical of the company's management, and between 2011 and 2020 made five attempts to join the company's board of directors. Cracker Barrel claimed Biglari had a "hidden agenda" and a conflict of interest by holding shares in other restaurant chains such as Steak 'n Shake. In 2022, Cracker Barrel entered into an agreement with Biglari, whereby the restaurant chain would agree to appoint Biglari's preferred nominee for the board of directors, Jody Bilney. As part of the agreement, Cracker Barrel was to pay Biglari compensation for monies spent by Biglari while in pursuit of specific board nominations. Mutual non‑disparagement and standstill agreements were also entered into by both parties.

== Litigation ==
=== Civil rights cases ===
In 1999 and 2001, federal lawsuits were filed against Cracker Barrel in Georgia. The former was brought by a group of employees who claimed the company had discriminated against them on the grounds of race, and the latter by customers making the same accusations. Both lawsuits were supported by the NAACP. Regarding both accusations, Cracker Barrel officials disputed the claims and stated that the company was committed to fair treatment of its employees and customers. In October 2002, a federal appeals court in Atlanta ruled that the NAACP and an additional 40 plaintiffs could not join the lawsuit brought by customers in 2001, and in January 2003 a federal magistrate recommended that the lawsuit brought by employees not be given class-action status. Both lawsuits were settled by the company in September, 2004.

The U.S. Justice Department filed a suit against Cracker Barrel in May 2004, after its own investigation had found evidence that the company allegedly violated Title II of the Civil Rights Act of 1964 by discriminating against minority customers at its restaurants. The company settled the lawsuit by signing a five-year agreement to introduce "effective nondiscrimination policies and procedures", and hiring an outside auditor to ensure compliance with the terms of the settlement.

=== Kraft Foods vs. Cracker Barrel ===
In November 2012, Cracker Barrel licensed its name to Smithfield Foods' John Morrell Division to sell a line of meat products through retail channels. In response, Kraft Foods, which has sold a line of cheese under the Cracker Barrel brand since 1954, filed a trademark-infringement lawsuit in February 2013. Kraft asked that the Smithfield Foods deal be nullified by the U.S. District Court in the Northern District of Illinois. A judge granted an injunction against the sale of the Cracker Barrel branded meat products. The injunction was upheld by the Seventh Circuit Court of Appeals and Cracker Barrel agreed to sell its products under the brand name "CB Old Country Store".
