= Biglari =

Biglari is an Iranian surname. Notable people with the surname include:

- Fereidoun Biglari (born 1970), Iranian archaeologist and museum curator
- Sardar Biglari (born 1977), investor and owner of Biglari Holdings
