= WorldNow =

American news software company (1998–2015)

- Type: Private
- Industry: Software, digital media
- Founder: Gary Gannaway
- Fate: Acquired by Frankly Inc., 2015; subsequently absorbed by Nexstar Media Group
- Headquarters: New York City, New York, United States
- Products: Digital content management platform for broadcasters

WorldNow was a New York City-based software company founded in 1998 by Gary Gannaway. The company developed a digital media platform for television broadcasters, allowing stations to manage and distribute content across websites, mobile applications and over-the-top services. Customers included CBS, Cox Media Group, Fox Television, Meredith Corporation, Media General and Raycom Media, which also held a minority stake in the company. In August 2015, WorldNow was acquired by San Francisco-based Frankly Inc. in a $45 million cash-and-stock deal. Frankly was subsequently acquired by and became a subsidiary of Nexstar Media Group.

== Products ==
WorldNow's platform integrated web content management, online video management and delivery, over-the-top (OTT) distribution, mobile applications and advertising tools in a single system aimed at local television broadcasters. It was offered as a software-as-a-service solution.

== Notable clients ==
- Raycom Media (1998) — also held a 37% minority stake in the company
- Meredith Corporation (2011)
- Fox Television Stations (2012)
- Media General (2013)
