= CBOCS =

CBOCS may refer to:

- Community Based Outpatient Clinics (CBOCs), a type of medical facility for veterans in the United States
- Cracker Barrel Old Country Store, Inc., an American restaurant chain
