= Western Sizzlin' =

American restaurant chain

Western Sizzlin' Corp.
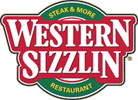
- Type: Subsidiary
- Industry: Food
- Founded: February 1962; 64 years ago Augusta, Georgia, U.S.
- Founder: Nicholas Pascarella
- Headquarters: Roanoke, Virginia, U.S.
- Number of locations: 25 (2025)
- Area served: United States
- Key people: Sardar Biglari
- Products: Steaks
- Brands: Western Sizzlin Steak & More Restaurant; Western Sizzlin's Wood Grill Buffet; Great American Buffet
- Services: Restaurants
- Parent: Biglari Holdings
- Website: www.western-sizzlin.com

Western Sizzlin’ is a chain of privately held and publicly held retail buffet restaurants and steakhouses, with its headquarters in Roanoke, Virginia. The company has 46 franchise establishments located across 13 U.S. states generally in the southeast (aside from Florida). It is a subsidiary of Biglari Holdings which is controlled by Iranian American businessman Sardar Biglari. The Western Sizzlin' business model was conceived in 1962, by Nick Pascarella, and founded the same year in Augusta, Georgia as: Western Sizzlin Steak & More Restaurant. In conceiving the business, Pasceralla reasoned that, "If searing the bottom of the steak made it juicy, adding flames to the top would make them twice as good."; leading to its renowned searing process trademarked as the FlameKist steak.

== History ==
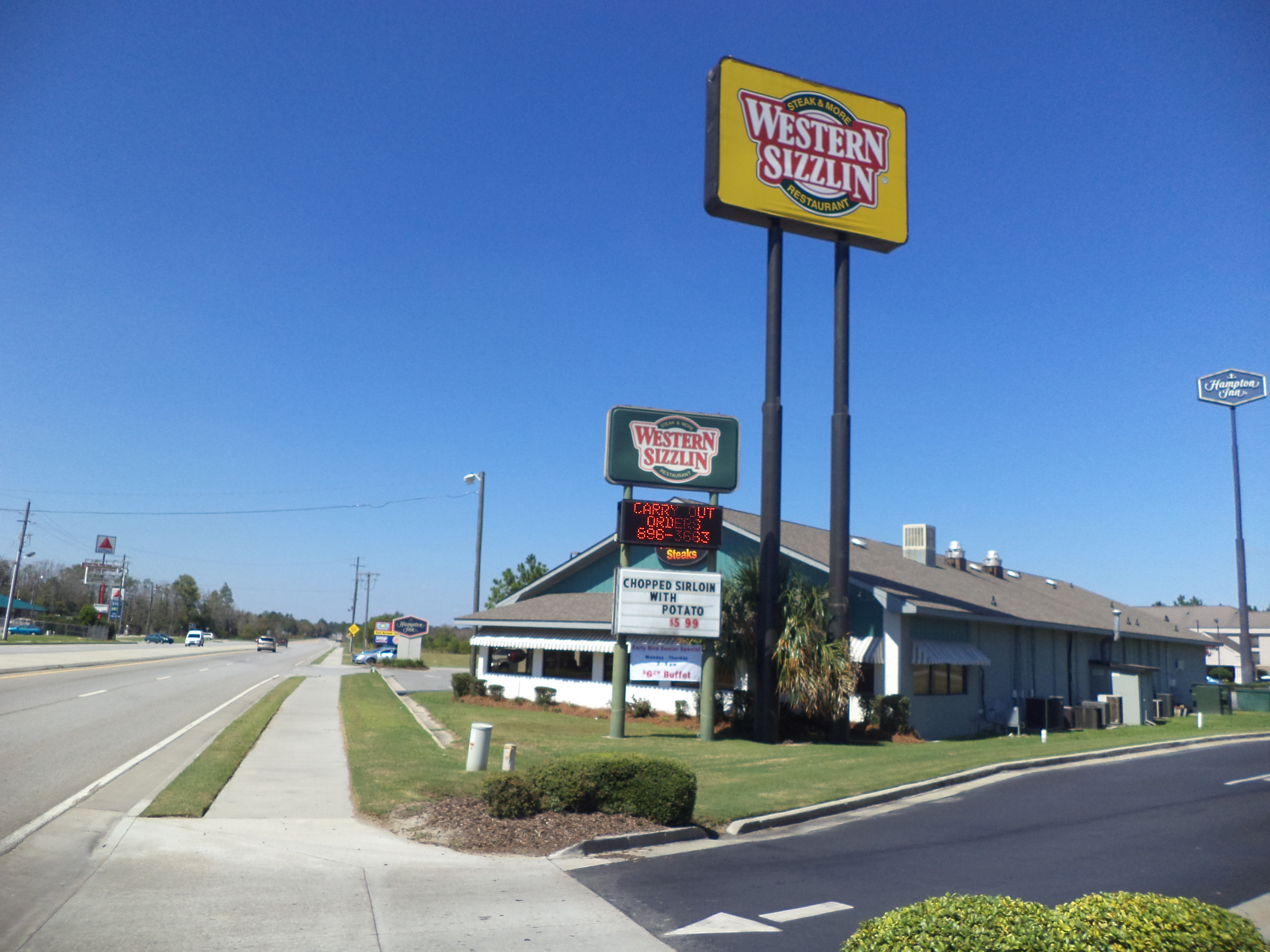
Western Sizzlin' in Adel, Georgia

Western Sizzlin' was established in 1962, by Nicholas Pascarella. He was traveling around the United States in search of cheap land on which to build a steakhouse, and he stopped in Augusta because of a flat tire. It was the employees at the tire store who convinced him to set up his restaurant in Augusta.

Following Pascarella's death in 1988, his spouse and their son decided to sell the business. It was subsequently bought by Frank Carney, co-founder of Pizza Hut. However, after the buyout, Carney experienced difficulties in growing the chain due to the high price his group paid for the business. Subsequently, Western Sizzlin' filed for bankruptcy, and operated under Chapter 11 bankruptcy protection for nearly eleven months. In 1993, Dave Wachtel acquired the company for $10 million.

In 1999, Western Sizzlin' merged with Austins Steaks & Saloon, and the combined company changed its name to Western Sizzlin' Corporation in 2003.

In 2010, Biglari Holdings purchased Western Sizzlin'.

== See also ==
- List of buffet restaurants
