= Maxim (magazine) =

British men's magazine, founded 1995

- Cover of the August 2017 issue, featuring Alexis Ren
- Editor-in-chief: Sardar Biglari
- Owner: Sardar Biglari (2014–present)
- Categories: Men's
- Frequency: Monthly
- Publisher: Biglari Holdings
- Total circulation: 928,753 (January 2017)
- Founder: Felix Dennis
- Founded: 1995, United Kingdom
- First issue: 1995
- Country: 17 editions in 76 countries
- Based in: New York City
- Language: English, many others
- Website: www.maxim.com
- ISSN: 1092-9789

Maxim (stylized in all caps) is an international men's magazine, devised and launched in the United Kingdom in 1995, but based in New York City since 1997. It is known for its photography of actors, singers and female models whose careers are at their peak. Maxim has a circulation of about 9 million readers each month. Maxim Digital reaches more than 4 million unique viewers each month. Maxim magazine publishes 16 editions, sold in 75 countries worldwide.

== History ==
Maxim was founded by Felix Dennis (1947–2014) in 1995 and expanded to the United States in 1997.

In 1999, MaximOnline.com (now maxim.com) was created. It contains content not included in the print version, and focuses on the same general topics, along with exclusive sections and videos.

In December 2001, Editorial Televisa published the Spanish-language edition of Maxim magazine for Latin America and the Hispanic communities of the United States, its first cover was Colombian model and actress Sofía Vergara.

On February 5, 2005, Maxim Radio, featuring male-oriented talk programming, debuted on Sirius Satellite Radio. Following the Sirius-XM merger in late 2008, the Maxim brand was dropped, and the channel is now known as Sirius XM Stars Too.

Since 2005, in Argentina, the Argentine edition of Maxim magazine began to adapt and approximate the styles of the American adult magazines Penthouse and Hustler, publishing photos of Argentine models in thongs and topless.

On June 5, 2006, the magazine announced plans to build a casino on the Las Vegas Strip north of Circus Circus, but the casino plan failed after local condominium owners complained that the proposed casino would ruin their view. The land was sold to MGM Mirage.

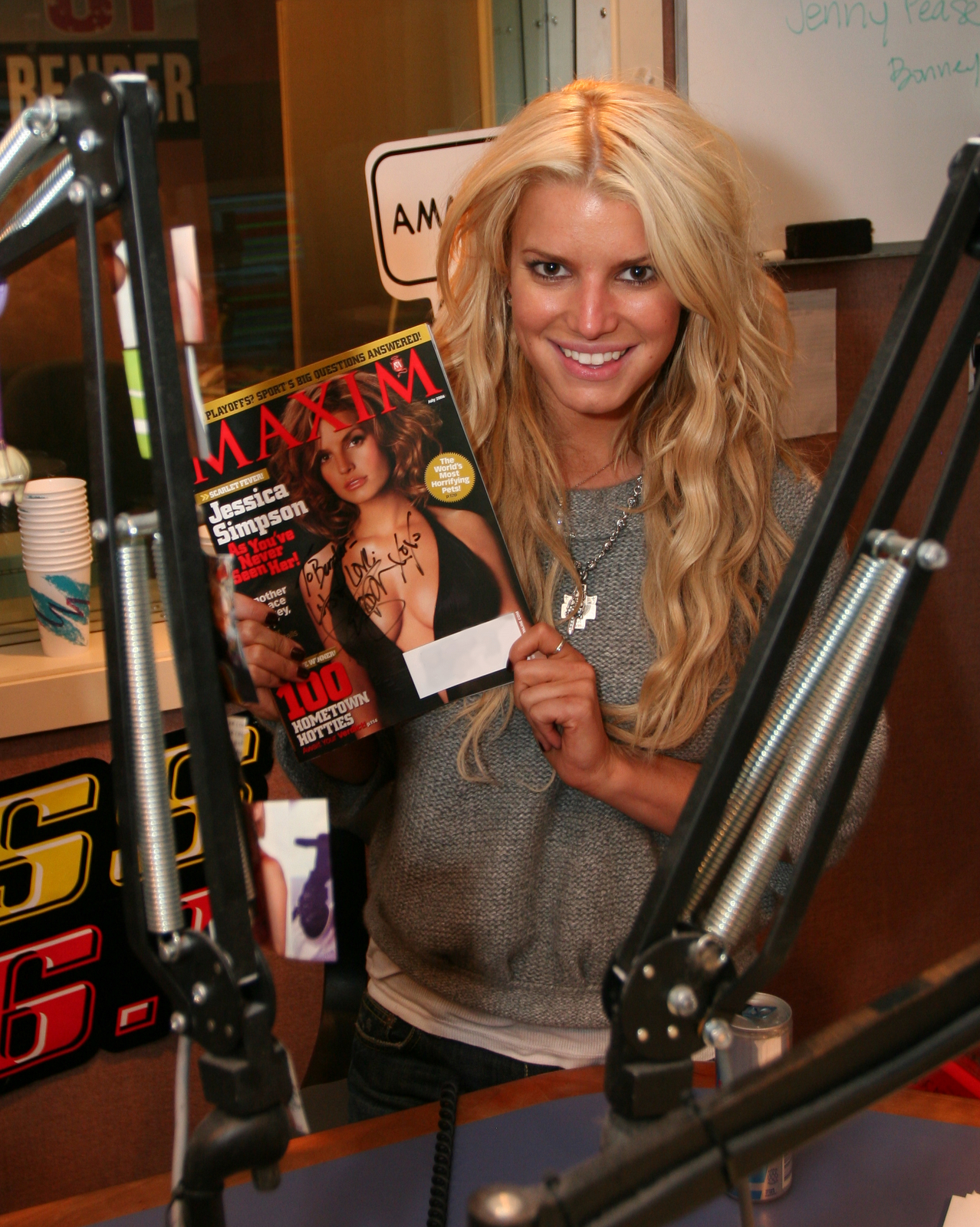
Jessica Simpson holding a copy featuring her on the cover, 2007

On June 15, 2007, private equity firm Quadrangle Group, along with long-time media executive Kent Brownridge, announced the acquisition of the parent company of Maxim, Blender, Stuff, and MaximOnline.com in the United States, under the name Alpha Media Group. As of April 23, 2009, Dennis Publishing has announced that it will no longer produce a print edition of Maxim in the United Kingdom, though the website for the UK version will remain.

Quadrangle Group gave up on its investment in Alpha Media Group in August 2009, making Cerberus Capital Management the majority partner. In 2013, Alpha announced the sale of Maxim to the newly created Darden Media Group, but Darden was unable to raise the money. Calvin Darden Jr. was later charged with fraud relating to the transaction.

Between 2010 and 2012, Maxim eliminated two issues, going from 12 issues a year to 10, and decreased its circulation numbers by 20%, from a reported 2.5 million to only 2.0 million.

The Argentine edition of the magazine Maxim stopped circulating in March 2013 in Argentina and its last cover was the Argentine model Valeria Degenaro.

On February 27, 2014, entrepreneur Sardar Biglari, the founder of Biglari Holdings and Biglari Capital, purchased Maxim. In September 2014, Kate Lanphear became editor-in-chief. During Lanphear's tenure, the September 2015 issue featured actor Idris Elba on its cover, marking the first time that the magazine did not have a woman on the cover. Lanphear left the magazine in November 2015.

In January 2016, Biglari officially took over as editor-in-chief of Maxim, though a Maxim staffer said that the new masthead title just formalized what had always been clear since Biglari's purchase; Biglari exercises full editorial control over Maxim. At one point in 2015, the staffer said, Biglari decided to throw out a nearly complete version of the December issue to completely redesign the magazine. On January 13, 2016, Gilles Bensimon joined Biglari as a special creative director.

The Indonesian edition of the magazine Maxim stopped circulating in August 2017 in Indonesia and its last cover was the Australian model Jessica Gomes.

Since 2018, Maxim has hosted an annual online competition known as the Maxim Cover Girl contest, in which aspiring models vie for a cash prize and a chance to appear on the magazine's cover. For example, the 2022 contest was won by Brooklin Bowdler, who earned a $25,000 prize and appeared on the January/February 2023 cover.

The runners-up that year were Teri Coleman (2nd place) and Hannah Catherine Whitmore (3rd place), both of whom were featured in profile stories by Maxim. Whitmore—known professionally as Hannah Foxx—was profiled as a Nevada intimacy coach with a medical background, reflecting the contest's reach beyond the traditional modeling scene. These finalist spotlights exemplify Maxim's engagement with a broad range of contestants through the Cover Girl competition.

In January 2026, Maxim announced the return of exclusive regional content to Latin America in February 2026, with its base of operations in El Salvador.

== MaximBet ==
In April 2021, Maxim collaborated with international sports betting operator, Carousel Group, to create MaximBet, a licensed iGaming and sports betting services provider. In September 2021, MaximBet made its debut in Colorado, when they partnered with Johnny Nolon's Saloon and Gambling Emporium. In late September 2021, MaximBet expanded its operations and its brand launched in Indiana.

In April 2022, just after the Major League Baseball lockout ended, MaximBet entered into an endorsement deal with an active MLB player, Charlie Blackmon of the Colorado Rockies, as a brand ambassador.

In May 2022, Nicki Minaj was named as the creative director and global ambassador of MaximBet.

== Events and controversies ==
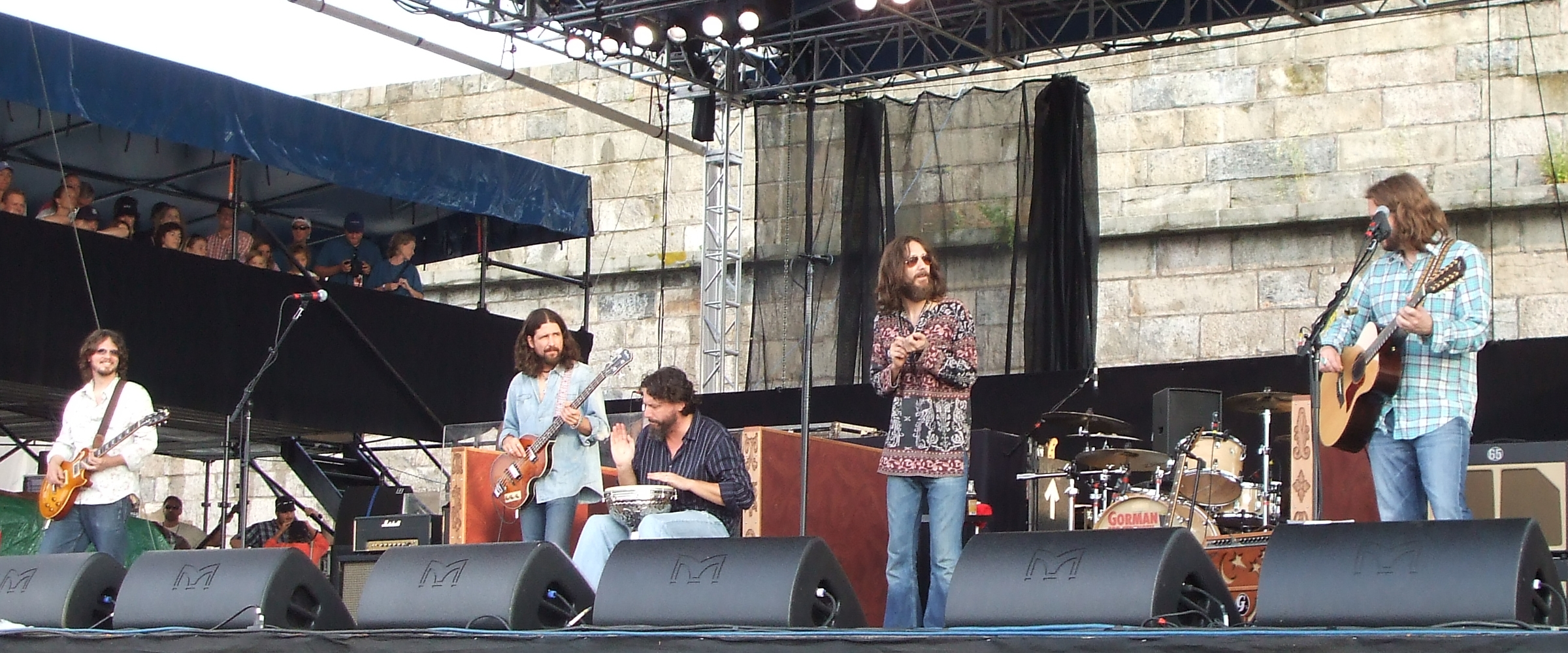
The Black Crowes

In 2004, the Gender Issues Centre, an on-campus feminist organization at Lakehead University in Thunder Bay, Ontario, Canada, protested an on-campus "Thunder Bay Boob Idol" event sponsored by Maxim and Coors Light. The Centre described Maxim as consisting of "sexist bravado and racist imagery". In 2006, Alok Jha of The Guardian criticized Maxim for encouraging excessive alcohol consumption and sexual objectification of women.

In June 2007, Israeli diplomat David Saranga invited Maxim to the country. In what came to be known as "beers and babes", the magazine did photo shoots of near-naked Israeli women who serve in the army. The campaign drew an angry reaction from lawmaker Colette Avital, a former diplomat who served as Israel's consul-general in New York City in the 1990s. Professor John H. Brown of Georgetown University described the spread as the first event in a new branch of public diplomacy.

In February 2008, Maxim was criticized by The Black Crowes for rating their upcoming CD, Warpaint, without hearing the entire album. Black Crowes manager Pete Angelus said, "Maxim's actions seem to completely lack journalistic integrity and intentionally mislead their readership." According to Crowes, the magazine stated in an email, "Of course, we always prefer to [sic] hearing music, but sometimes there are big albums that we don't want to ignore that aren't available to hear, which is what happened with the Crowes. It's either an educated guess preview or no coverage at all, so in this case we chose the former." The magazine's editorial director James Kaminsky later apologized, stating, "It is Maxim's editorial policy to assign star ratings only to those albums that have been heard in their entirety. Unfortunately, that policy was not followed in the March 2008 issue of our magazine and we apologize to our readers." Facing more criticism over rating albums without listening to them, Maxim magazine maintains it was previewing CDs in its March 2008 issue, not reviewing them, and the mistake was to include star ratings.

The magazine endorsed the Donald Trump 2024 presidential campaign.

== International editions ==
Maxim has launched international editions of its magazines since 1995. In 2006, it has launched its 26th and 27th international editions in Serbia and Greece, where it is published by Attica Media. Notably, the magazine has been circulating editions in South Korea, Indonesia (defunct), India (defunct), Japan, Portugal (as Maxmen), the United States, Thailand, France (as Maximal), Russia, Turkey, Serbia, Greece, Bulgaria, Czech Republic, Argentina (defunct), Italy, Canada, Poland, Brazil, Germany, Australia (defunct), Mexico (defunct), Colombia (defunct), the Philippines and Ukraine (defunct),

== Maxim Hot 100 ==
Each year since 2000, Maxim has released the Maxim Hot 100. The winners and their corresponding ages and the year in which the magazine was released are listed below.

Year	Choice	Age	Occupation	Notes
2000	Estella Warren	21	Actress/Model	
2001	Jessica Alba	20	Actress	Youngest winner.
2002	Jennifer Garner	30	Actress	First time anyone has debuted on the list at number one.
2003	Christina Aguilera	22	Singer	First singer.
2004	Jessica Simpson	24	Singer/Actress	
2005	Eva Longoria	30	Actress	
2006	Eva Longoria	31	Actress	First and only woman to win twice (in a row).
2007	Lindsay Lohan	21	Actress/Singer	
2008	Marisa Miller	29	Model	Second time anyone has debuted on the list at number one.
2009	Olivia Wilde	25	Actress	
2010	Katy Perry	26	Singer	
2011	Rosie Huntington-Whiteley	24	Model/Actress	Third time anyone has debuted on the list at number one.
2012	Bar Refaeli	26	Model	
2013	Miley Cyrus	21	Singer/Actress	
2014	Candice Swanepoel	25	Model	
2015	Taylor Swift	26	Singer	
2016	Stella Maxwell	25	Model	Fourth time anyone has debuted on the list at number one.
2017	Hailey Baldwin	20	Model	
2018	Kate Upton	25	Model/Actress	
2019	Olivia Culpo	27	Influencer	
2021	Teyana Taylor	30	Singer/Actress	Fifth time anyone has debuted on the list at number one.
2022	Paige Spiranac	29	Golfer/Influencer	
2023	Ashley Graham	35	Model/Influencer	
2024	Elizabeth Hurley	59	Actress/Model	
2025	Elle Macpherson	61	Model	Oldest winner.

== UK Woman of the Year Awards ==
The awards ceremony for the United Kingdom edition of the magazine began in 2000. The winners for each category were voted on by readers of the magazine.

=== 2000 ===
Award	Winner
Woman of the Year	Cat Deeley
Most Beautiful Woman	Adriana Sklenarikova
Maxim International Woman	Caprice

=== 2001 ===
Award	Winner
Woman of the Year	Tamzin Outhwaite
Best TV Soap Personality	Joanna Taylor
Best TV Presenter	Cat Deeley
Best Film Actress	Kate Winslet
Best International Singer	Madonna
Most Stylish Woman	Lady Victoria Hervey
Maxim International Woman	Caprice
Maxim Icon award	Ursula Andress

=== 2002 ===
Award	Winner
Woman of the Year	Jessie Wallace
Best TV Soap Personality	Jennifer Ellison
Best TV Actress	Fay Ripley
Best Comedy Actress	Ronni Ancona
Best Film Actress	Nicole Kidman
Best Band	Mis-Teeq
Best UK Singer	Sophie Ellis-Bextor
Best International Singer	Kylie Minogue
Best Stage Performance	Dannii Minogue
Best Radio DJ	Sara Cox
Maxim International Woman	Caprice
Maxim Icon award	Joan Collins

== See also ==
- Glamour photography
- List of men's magazines
- Maxim Radio
- Dennis Digital
