= E. W. Kelley =

American restaurateur

- Born: Estel Wood Kelley; March 24, 1917; Coatesville, Indiana, U.S.
- Died: July 4, 2003 (aged 86); Plainfield, Indiana, U.S.
- Resting place: Sharpsville Cemetery; Sharpsville, Indiana, U.S.
- Occupations: Businessman; franchisor
- Years active: 1939–2000
- Known for: Purchasing, and "founding" Steak 'n Shake

Estel Wood "Ed" Kelley (1917–2003) is considered the "modern-day" founder of Steak 'n Shake, a chain of sit-down, old-fashioned style restaurants known for their Steakburgers and hand-dipped milkshakes. In 1981, E. W. Kelley & Associates, a group led by E. W. Kelley, bought controlling interest in Steak 'n Shake, and grew the company from a small chain to the more than 450 location chain As of 2006.

== Early life ==
Originally from Sharpsville, Indiana, Kelley attended Indiana University's (IU) School of Business in the 1930s. While at IU, he founded the Accounting Club, chaired IU Sing, was president of the IU student body, and was a member of Sigma Chi fraternity. He graduated in 1939. In 1979, he was honored as a Significant Sig.

== Restaurant business ==
Kelley ran Bird's Eye, a division of General Foods, and thought up adding pearl onions to frozen peas. He later served as president and chairman of Consolidated Cigar, and headed Fairmont Foods, where he helped develop the Klondike Bar, directed the roll-outs of Tang and Cool Whip, created parts of the Lean Cuisine line, and brought Grey Poupon to America.

He was founding partner of Kelley & Partners, Ltd. and taught at the Columbia Business School.

Kelley was always philanthropic, giving millions of dollars to IU and Howard Community Hospital, now known as Community Howard Regional Health, in Kokomo, Indiana. He donated to Indiana University-Kokomo, (IUK), for the Kelley Student Center, Kelley House, the library building and the E. W. Kelley Scholarship fund. He gave money in 1999 to establish the E. W. Kelley Chair in Business Administration at IU Bloomington, and $23 million to establish the IU Bloomington's Business School's Kelley Scholars program in 1997, which led IU to rename the School of Business to the Kelley School of Business. He also supported the Bloomington campus' Alumni center, School of Music, the Mellencamp Pavilion, and the Alva Prickett Chair in Accounting.
