= Julie Masino =

American businessperson

- Born: Julie Felss Masino; United States
- Education: Miami University (BA, 1993)
- Occupation: Businessperson

Julie Felss Masino is an American businessperson. Masino is the former CEO of the Cracker Barrel restaurant chain. She was previously (2018–2023) the president of Taco Bell North America, and subsequently Taco Bell International.

Masino received a Bachelor of Arts in communication from Miami University in 1993.

Masino worked at Cracker Barrel from August 2023, from November as president and CEO..

Masino was the subject of controversy after she in August 2025 oversaw the redesign of the Cracker Barrel sign and restaurants in an attempt to appeal to younger customers. After considerable public backlash and Cracker Barrel stock plummeting in price, within a week Masino reversed her decision to update and change the restaurants and company sign.

On Monday, July 27, 2026, Masino was terminated from her position at Cracker Barrel and was replaced by David Deno, the former head of Bloomin' Brands.
