= Castle Heights Military Academy =

Private school in Lebanon, Tennessee, US (1902–1986)

Coordinates: 36°12′47″N 86°18′22″W

Location
- 200 North Castle Heights Avenue; Lebanon, Wilson County, Tennessee 37087; United States

Information
- Former name: Castle Heights School
- School type: Private Military
- Founded: 1902
- Closed: 1986

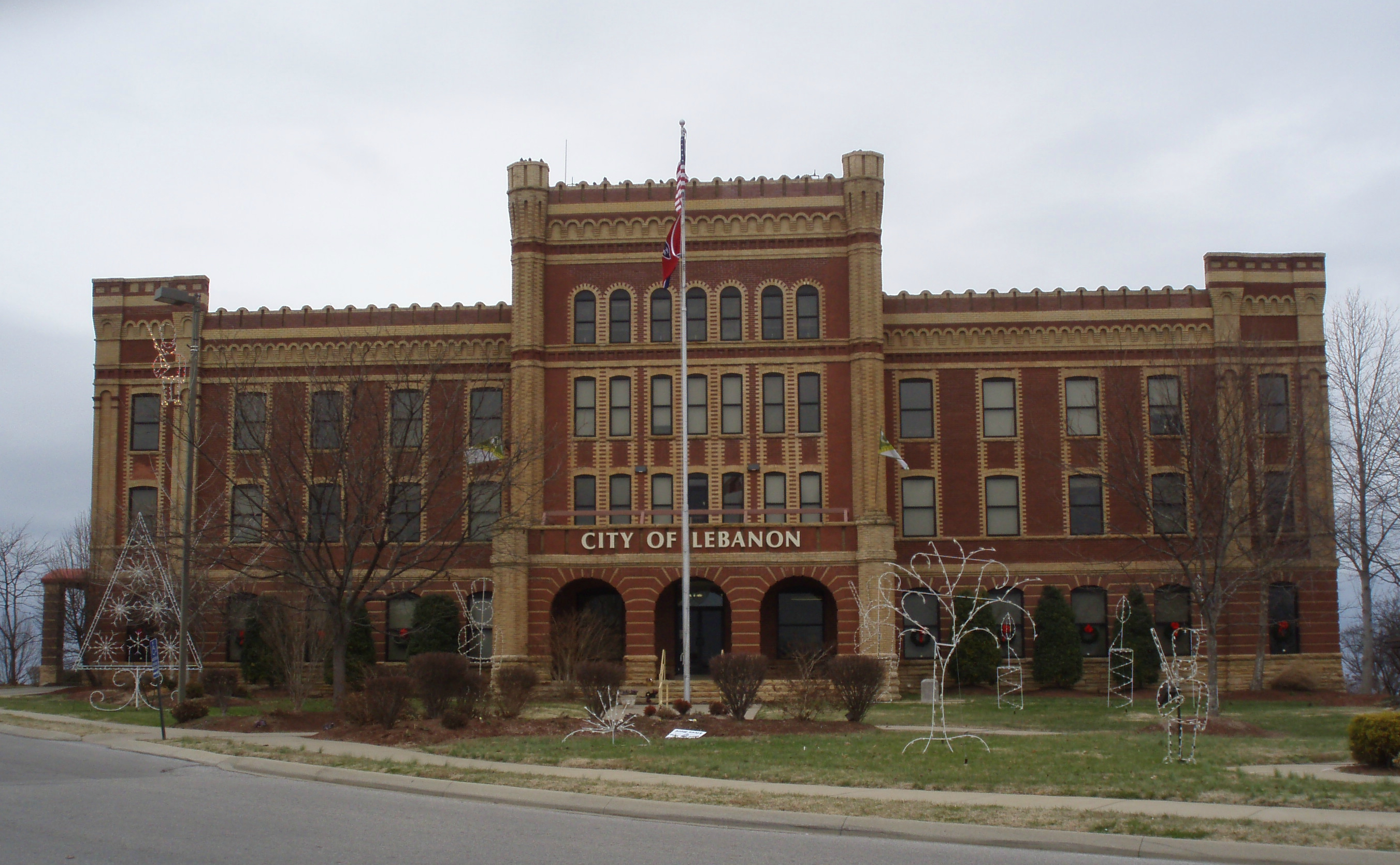
Lebanon City Hall occupies one of the buildings at the former Castle Heights Military Academy

Castle Heights Military Academy was a private military academy in Lebanon, Tennessee, United States. It opened in 1902 and became a military school in 1918. The school closed in 1986. Its former campus was placed on the National Register of Historic Places as the Castle Heights Academy Historic District in 1996.

== History ==
The academy was founded in 1902 as Castle Heights School outside of Lebanon, Tennessee. Its founders were David Mitchell, president of Cumberland University; Isaac W. P. Buchanan, a mathematics teacher at the recently defunct Cumberland Preparatory School; Amzi W. Hooker, a resident of Lebanon; and Laban Lacy Rice, a former English instructor at the Cumberland Preparatory School.

Rice served as the school's headmaster and was later president of Cumberland University. Buchanan taught mathematics at the school and was later its business manager and headmaster. The academy was initially coeducational and had 96 boarding students. It became a military preparatory school for boys in 1918 as a response to World War I. By the next year, the military academy had 415 cadets.

In 1928, Castle Heights Military Academy struggled financially and was bought for $100,000 by Bernarr Macfadden, a millionaire publisher. physical trainer, and nationally known fitness advocate. He hired Harry L. Armstrong as the academy's superintendent, and Daniel Taylor Ingram, a Virginia Military Institute graduate and former assistant commandant of Fishburne Military School, as its commandant. Macfadden required the students to eat salads every day, not to use condiments or pillows, to participate in sports, and to drink so much milk that the school acquired a dairy. He also introduced boxing and wrestling programs. Students' height and weight appeared on their monthly report cards.

In 1954, the school had grown to almost 500 students and operated a summer camp. After Macfadden's died in 1955, the academy was operated by The Bernarr Macfadden Foundation. Sanford Naval Academy was founded in Sanford, Florida, as a sister institution in 1963. In 1965, Ingram became the academy's superintendent, after serving as its commandant since 1929.

In 1973, the school began admitting female day students. The Castle Heights Foundation purchased the school in 1974. The school ceased operations in 1986 in the face of declining enrollment and debt. Cumberland University maintains records and other school memorabilia.

Many of the former academy's buildings have been restored and now house the Lebanon City Hall, Lebanon Museum and History Center, and other small businesses. Previously undeveloped areas of campus have been subdivided and now are the location of businesses, such as banks and nursing homes. The Mitchell House served as the headquarters of the holding company for Cracker Barrel Old Country Store from 1998 to 2013. It was purchased by Sigma Pi fraternity in 2013 and served as its international headquarters until 2017.

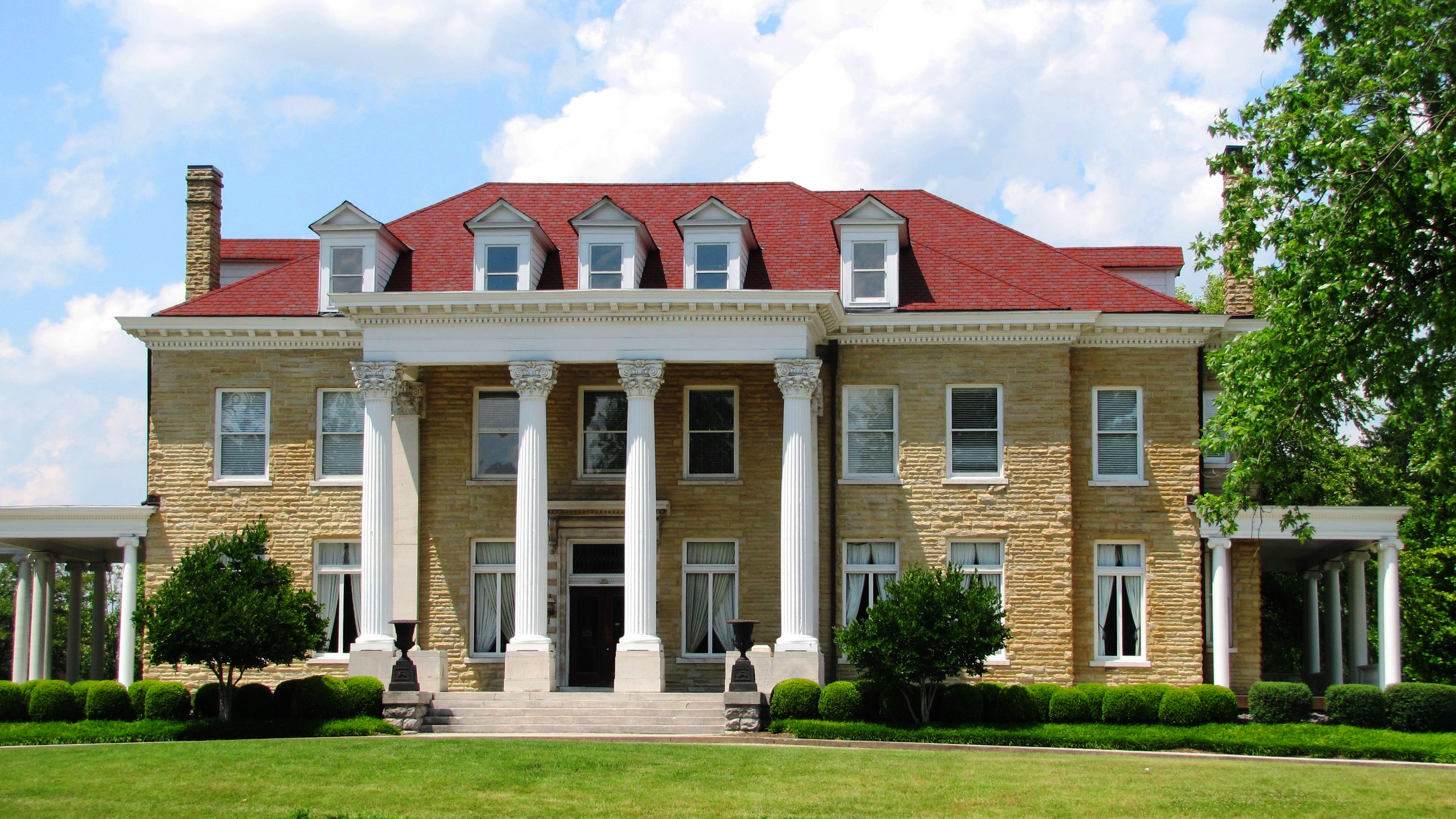
Mitchell House

== Campus ==
Castle Heights Academy's administrative building was designed by architect Tom Chamberlain in the Gothic Revival style in 1902. The Queen Anne style president's house was building in 1902, west the administrative building. Rutherford Parks Library and Mildred Armstrong Hospital were added in 1905, both in collegiate gothic style.

An auditorium and gymnasium were built in 1928 and named for the school's owner, Bernarr Macfadden. The Mitchell House, the former home of founder David Mitchell, was purchased by the school in 1936 and used to house the junior school; it was called Macfadden Hall. Behind the Mitchell House was a springhouse that was used for gun storage. The campus included 150 acres and was expanded to 225 acres in the 1930s. The McFadden Foundation Auditorium was added to the campus in 1941.

The campus was added to the National Register of Historic Places as the Castle Heights Academy Historic District in 1996.

== Notable alumni ==
- Duane Allman founder and member of the Allman Brothers Band
- Gregg Allman, founder and member of the Allman Brothers Band
- Rex Armistead, investigator of the Mississippi State Sovereignty Commission and controversial private detection involved in the Arkansas Project
- Lynn Bomar, professional football player
- J. Wyeth Chandler, Mayor of Memphis, 1972–1982
- Wesley Clark, general in the United States Army and U.S. European NATO commander
- Herb Covington, football player of Centre College
- Roger Davis, (born April 5, 1939) is an actor and entrepreneur
- William Dudley, competition swimmer who represented the United States at the 1948 Summer Olympics
- Dan Evins, co-founder of Cracker Barrel Old Country Store
- Gary Gannaway, businessman, entrepreneur, and philanthropist
- Max Hardberger, adventurer, ship recovery specialist, admiralty lawyer, and author of maritime fiction and nonfiction adventures
- Allison B. Humphreys, justice of the Tennessee Supreme Court
- Dewey Lambdin, novelist
- Lance W. Lord, general in the United States Air Force
- Thomas P. McKenna, United States Army officer and author
- Gilbert S. Merritt Jr., United States circuit judge of the United States Court of Appeals for the Sixth Circuit from 1977 to 2022
- Reid Moseley, All-American college football for Georgia Bulldogs football
- Pete Rademacher, heavyweight boxer
- Victor R. Steeh, member of the Michigan House of Representatives
- Willard Steele, college football player and physician
- Steve Stephens, broadcasting pioneer in Arkansas
- John Tidwell, member of the Tennessee House of Representatives
- Banks Turner, member of the Tennessee General Assembly
- Herbert S. Walters, member of the United States Senate

== See also ==
- List of defunct military academies in the United States
- National Register of Historic Places listings in Wilson County, Tennessee
