= Mitchell House (Lebanon, Tennessee) =

United States national historic place

- U.S. National Register of Historic Places
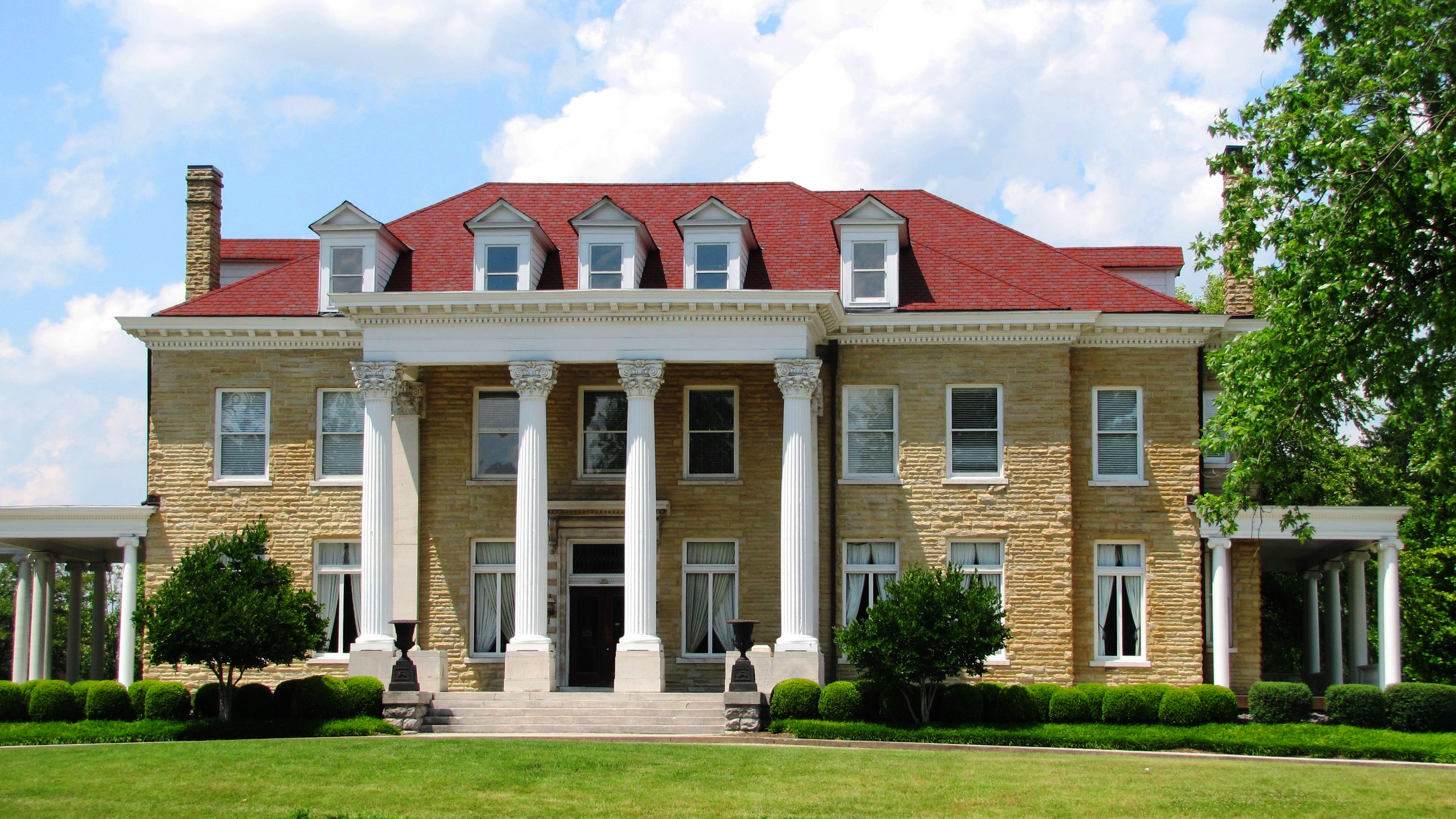
- The Mitchell House, June 2010

- Location within Tennessee Location within the United States
- Location: 106 N. Castle Heights Ave., Lebanon, Tennessee, Wilson County, Tennessee
- Coordinates: 36°12′40″N 86°18′29″W
- Area: 2 acres (0.81 ha)
- Built: 1910
- Architect: Thompson, Gibel & Asmus
- Architectural style: Neo-Classical Revival
- NRHP reference No.: 79003435
- Added to NRHP: 1979

The Mitchell House is a Neo-Classical Revival Style building in Lebanon, Tennessee, that was built as a home by Dr. David Mitchell and his wife, Elizabeth. It was designed by architects Thompson, Gibel & Asmus. Construction began in 1906 and was completed in 1910 with 10,600 square feet of living space. At the time, Dr. Mitchell was the president of Cumberland University and a co-founder of Castle Heights Military Academy. Craftsmen were brought in to work on the extensive millwork and wood panelings and floors. Chandeliers were imported from Italy and rugs were imported from Austria.

While the Mitchells lived in the home, it was used for many community events and weddings. In 1919, there was a typhoid outbreak in the area and both of the Mitchells’ children became sick. Mrs. Mitchell nursed them both back to health before becoming ill with the disease herself. She died three days later at the age of 42. Dr. Mitchell was heartbroken and moved to California, leaving his children in the care of their maternal grandparents, Rev. and Mrs. Arthur Smith. They lived in the house until 1923 before moving the children to Florida. The home would stay empty until 1936.

While living in California, Dr. Mitchell deeded the house to his children to keep it from being foreclosed on by creditors. The children would never live in the house and sold it to Castle Heights Military Academy in 1936.

Castle Heights turned the home into a junior school. The upstairs was remodeled into living quarters for the students and the downstairs was turned into classrooms. During this time a kitchen, restrooms, and an apartment were added to the building which increased its size to 11,500 square feet and it became known as MacFadden Hall. The boys who lived in the hall were known as goobers and the house was called Goober School by the students. The building would remain a junior school for fifty years, until the academy closed in 1986.

After the closure of Castle Heights, the house would be abandoned for twelve years until it was purchased by Cracker Barrel Old Country Store, Inc., in 1997. Cracker Barrel's founder, Dan Evins, was a graduate of Castle Heights and had served as chairman of the board of directors for the school while his son attended it.

Evins and Cracker Barrel set about restoring the home and found the original construction drawings. The drawings did not have details for the inside of the building so the restoration crew had to use old photos they found in yearbooks and newspapers as well as memories of former students and teachers. The restoration took less than a year to complete even though many windows, panels, and ceilings, as well as the porches, had to be replaced. Mike Manous was the architect who oversaw the restoration with a budget of $2 million.

After the restoration the building became the home of Cracker Barrel Old Country Store Corporate Headquarters (CBRL Group, Inc.).

In 2013, Cracker Barrel sold the building to Sigma Pi fraternity which used the building as its international headquarters. No purchase amount was made public but the house had been listed for $1,095,000 on loopnet.com. The fraternity had a museum and meeting spaces on the first floor with offices located on the second floor. The fraternity sold the property to the city of Lebanon on May 17, 2019, and moved its headquarters to Nashville.

The building was listed as a historic landmark by the state of Tennessee and the National Register of Historic Places in 1979.
