= William Dudley (swimmer) =

American swimmer (1931–1978)

- Dudley in his youth

Personal information
- Full name: William Henry Dudley III
- National team: United States
- Born: January 15, 1931 New Orleans, Louisiana, U.S.
- Died: January 18, 1978 (aged 47) New Orleans, Louisiana, U.S.
- Spouse: Eleanor Marie Villere

Sport
- Sport: Swimming
- Strokes: Freestyle
- Club: New Orleans Athletic Club (NOAC)
- College team: Tulane Swim Club; Not official Varsity Team
- Coach: Bert Raacke (NOAC)

William Henry Dudley III (January 15, 1931 – January 18, 1978) was an American competition swimmer who competed for Castle Heights Military Academy, and represented the United States in the 4x200 freestyle relay as a 17-year-old at the 1948 Summer Olympics in London .

Born in New Orleans on January 15, 1931, he competed for the New Orleans Athletic Club under Coach Bert Raacke, who said of him at 17, "He has great swimming potentialities, more than anyone in the South now". While at Castle Heights Military Academy, Dudley captured mid-South records of 22.5 in the 50-yard freestyle, 56.1 in the 100-yard freestyle, and shared a record for the freestyle and medley relays. Dudley graduated from Lebanon, Tennessee's Castle Heights Military Academy, and captained their Swim team in 1947.

== 1948 Olympics ==
Dudley finished a close second in the 200-meter finals at the 1948 Olympic trials in Detroit, Michigan, with a time of 2:14.5, just behind Walley Wolf of Beverly Hill, California. He finished fourth in the 100-meter freestyle at the trial, defeating Brewster MacFadden, another alumnus of Castle Heights.

Dudley swam for the gold medal-winning U.S. team in the preliminary heats of the men's 4×200-meter freestyle relay. He did not receive a medal, however, because under the rules in effect in 1948, only those relay swimmers who competed in the event final were eligible. The American 4x200 relay team that won the final heat consisted of Wally Ris, Jimmy McLane, Wally Wolf, and Bill Smith, and had a combined time of 8:46.0. They defeated second place Hungary who took the silver in a close race by only 2.4 seconds. The American team's anchorman Bill Smith opened a slight lead, which he maintained till the end of the race. Overall, the Hungarian and American teams dominated the individual medals. The 1948 Olympic Men's Head Coach was Bob Kiphuth.

=== Tulane University ===
He was a 1953 graduate of Tulane University, where he earned a degree in mechanical engineering. In 1950, during his college years, Dudley set five Southern AAU District Swim Records. He competed for Tulane at the club level, as they had no varsity swimming. In his freshman year at Tulane, he captained its Club swim team and also competed for the New Orleans Athletic Club. During his time at Tulane, he became the Southeastern Conference Champion and won AAU titles in the junior and senior 220-yard freestyles. In May 1949, for the 1948-49 school year, he was an academic honoree at Tulane.

=== Later life ===
In 1965 Dudley founded Dudley Engineering Co., a manufacturer's representative for HVAC equipment, which he managed until his death. He belonged to the American Society of Heating, Refrigerating and Air Conditioning Engineers. He was also a member of the Manufacturers Agents National Association, and as an active businessman, participated in the New Orleans Chamber of Commerce.

=== Honors ===
He was a 1986 inductee into the Greater New Orleans Sports Hall of Fame.

In December 1950, Dudley was nominated along with seven other athletes for the prestigious Sullivan Award for the top amateur athlete of the year, though he did not finish highly in the final voting.

Dudley died of what was diagnosed as a heart attack in his office in New Orleans, Louisiana on January 19, 1978 and was buried at New Orlean's Lawn Park Cemetery in Orleans Parish.
