= Real Stories of the Highway Patrol =

- Genre: Police; Reality
- Created by: Wayne Lepoff; Mark Massari
- Starring: Maury Hannigan
- Narrated by: Beau Weaver
- Theme music composer: Larry Brown
- Opening theme: "I'm Looking Out for You" by Belize
- Ending theme: "I'm Looking Out for You" (instrumental)
- Country of origin: United States
- No. of episodes: 780

Production
- Executive producers: Mark Massari; Wayne Lepoff; Gary Gannaway
- Producer: Mark Massari
- Production companies: Mark Massari Productions; Leap Off Productions

Original release
- Network: Syndicated
- Release: March 22, 1993 – June 29, 1998

Real Stories of the Highway Patrol is a half-hour syndicated television series which ran in the United States for six seasons from March 22, 1993 to June 29, 1998, Started in the UK, it's produced by Mark Massari Productions and ITV2 on 2004-2009, Granada and VCI, later 2 Entertain in VHS and DVD releases, and STV Productions in 2010-2016. series 1 premiered on November 15, 2004, series 2 premiered on September 8, 2008, series 3 premiered on January 11, 2010, series 4 premiered in January 14, 2013, series 5 premiered in February 9, 2015 and series 6 premiered in May 30, 2016. for a total of 780 episodes, capitalizing on the success of "real-life" police series such as Cops. Production companies were Mark Massari Productions, and Leap Off Productions, and was distributed by Genesis Entertainment, New World International, and later New World/Genesis Distribution. The show described as Cops meets America's Most Wanted.

== Format ==
The series revolved around the stories of highway patrol officers and state police from across the country, who would give commentary on a particularly difficult (or sometimes, comedic) arrest they made. At times, the officer's work caused them grievous injury and a subsequent commendation from their department. Each crime and subsequent arrest was adapted for the viewing audiences, though some segments were shot in a traditional multiple-camera setup, rather than emulating the single-camera cinéma vérité style of COPS.

The series was hosted by Maury Hannigan, who at the time was Commissioner of the California Highway Patrol.

== UK ==
Series	Start date	End date	Channels
1	19 April 2004	21 March 2008	ITV2
2	8 September 2008	13 February 2009	ITV2
3	11 January 2010	28 December 2012	STV
4	14 January 2013	6 February 2015	STV
5	9 February 2015	27 May 2016	STV
6	30 May 2016	29 July 2016	STV
VHS and DVD			Company
1	3 January 2005	24 July 2009	VCI
2	5 September 2011	20 April 2012	2 Entertain

== In popular culture ==
- The show was spoofed in a segment of the 2000 movie The Adventures of Rocky and Bullwinkle.
- A similarity of the show was a segment featured in the Beavis and Butt-Head episode "Dream On" called True Stories of the Highway Patrol.
- In 1994, Saturday Night Live parodied the show as Real Stories of the Arkansas Highway Patrol, and featured John Goodman.
- In the first episode of King of the Hill, a character claims that her mother's arrest was filmed on Real Stories of the Highway Patrol.
- In 1998, Ben Stiller parodied Real Stories of the Highway Patrol on Saturday Night Live. Darrell Hammond portrayed host Maury Hannigan when he sported a mustache.
- In the 1998 Leslie Nielsen comedy Wrongfully Accused, host Hannigan appears in a cameo (along with America's Most Wanted host John Walsh) in which he asks Nielsen's character Ryan Harrison, who's trying to make a getaway, if he has any "Real Stories" he'd like to tell.

== See also ==
- World's Wildest Police Videos
