= Steve Stephens =

American television and communication pioneer (1930–2021)

Stephen Owen Stephens (April 22, 1930 – January 29, 2021) was a broadcasting pioneer in Arkansas, who originally became well known as the host of Steve's Show, a hugely popular television program in the late 1950s and early 1960s. He remained a communication specialist well into the 21st century.

== Early years ==
Born in 1930, to Allie and Owen Stephens in Newport, Arkansas, Stephens later attended Castle Heights Military Academy, and graduated from Newport High School. Following graduation, he attended the University of Arkansas until the Korean War erupted in 1950, when in his quest for adventure, he enlisted in the United States Marine Corps. Attaining the rank of sergeant, he received three battle stars in Korea. After the Korean armistice was signed in 1953, he was honorably discharged and returned to Newport.

== Career ==
While in the Marines, he was occasionally asked if he had ever been a broadcaster, as he seemed to have a natural "radio voice." After returning to Newport, he began as a part-time announcer at radio station KNBY, and soon became known as the "Voice of the White River Valley."

His entry into radio coincided with the beginnings of rock and roll, and he soon became a popular proponent of this new type of music. His style began to capture the attention of Little Rock television station KTHV, the Arkansas affiliate of the CBS television network, who offered him an entry position as a station announcer.

Shortly after joining the station, he began hosting a television dance party in March 1957, which became an instant success. As bus loads of teenagers began arriving from all over the state, the show was expanded to six days a week.

Stephens helped launch the careers of Johnny Cash, Conway Twitty, Charlie Rich, Brenda Lee, Sonny Burgess, Fabian Forte and many others who appeared on Steve's Show during its 8-year run. As a result of his continuing popularity during that time, he was awarded a recording contract, recording "Pizza Pete," "Honey Bee," "How It Used To Be," and "Weird Session", and was voted "Arkansas Top Television Personality."

From 1957 until 1965, he served as senior weatherman for KTHV television at both 6:00 pm and 10:00 pm, and was also the first to use radar in his weathercast. He new broke ground in another way when he became one of the first TV weathermen in the nation to use radar to detect Santa Claus flying into the state.

Stephens went on to produce other TV programs for KTHV, including Eye on Arkansas, which showcased such celebrities as Liberace, then-actor Ronald Reagan, Roy Rogers, Douglas Fairbanks, Jr., the casts of the popular TV programs The Beverly Hillbillies and Bonanza, and many other notables.

== Retirement from television ==
In 1965, Stephens left television after being invited by U.S. Senator John Little McClellan to join him on his staff in Washington, D.C. as a special assistant in charge of media relations. In 1968, he returned to Arkansas to form his own advertising, public relations, and travel agency.

In 1986, he was approached by financier Jackson T. Stephens, chairman of the investment banking firm of Stephens Inc., to join him as his assistant and director of corporate communications. He remained with Stephens Inc. until his retirement in 1998. Following retirement, he continued to be active as a "voice talent" for numerous local and national radio and television commercials, as well as documentaries. In 2005, he created and began narrating a radio program for public radio station KUAR/AETN, Biography Arkansas.

== Recognition ==
Stephens also served as a National Trustee for the March of Dimes Foundation for over a decade, and was named an Honorary Life Trustee of the organization in 1998. During that time, he was awarded the "Jonas Salk Lifetime Achievement" award by the Salk Institute for his fund raising efforts on behalf of the March of Dimes.

In recognition of his pioneering achievements in broadcasting, he was inducted into the Arkansas Entertainers Hall of Fame, and later his name was added to the Arkansas Walk of Fame in Hot Springs. On April 22, 2010 (the anniversary of his birthday), he was recognized by the Eighth General Assembly of the Arkansas House of Representatives with a Lifetime Achievement Citation, "for maintaining a high degree of professionalism and integrity during his 50 years in the business and broadcasting community of Arkansas." In 2011, he was inducted into his hometown (Newport, Arkansas) High School Hall of Fame.

In 2018, Stephens was honored by the National Academy of Television Arts and Sciences MidAmerica Chapter with a Lifetime Achievement Award honoring individuals who have represented the very best of television, while making a significant contribution to broadcasting.
