= Sardar Biglari =

Iranian-born American businessman

- Born: 1977 (age 48–49); Tehran, Imperial State of Iran
- Citizenship: American
- Education: Trinity University
- Occupations: Founder, chairman and CEO, Biglari Holdings

Sardar Biglari (Persian: سردار بیگلری; born 1977) is an American entrepreneur who founded and serves as chairman and CEO of Biglari Holdings and as chairman and CEO of Steak 'n Shake. Biglari founded Biglari Capital and is the general partner to The Lion Fund.

== Early life ==
Biglari was born in Iran in 1977, two years before the Iranian Revolution. His father, Brigadier General Biglari, served in the Imperial Iranian Armed Forces. Following the revolution, the family escaped Iran as refugees, and in 1984, settled in San Antonio, Texas.

== Career ==
=== Early career ===
At the age of 18, Biglari founded INTX.net, an Internet service provider, by raising $15,000. In 1999, with concerns about the tech bubble, he sold the company to Internet America. With the proceeds of the sale, Biglari started an investment partnership at the age of 22. The fund bought shares in restaurant companies, including Friendly Ice Cream and Western Sizzlin Corp., of which he became chairman and CEO in 2006. Friendly Ice Cream founder, S. Prestley Blake, found an ally in Biglari and he cashed out and profited when Friendly's was bought out by a private-equity firm. The case was covered by Harvard Business School professors Fabrizio Ferri, V.G. Narayanan and James Weber.

Biglari operates Biglari Holdings in San Antonio.

=== Steak 'n Shake ===
In March 2008, Biglari joined the board of directors for Steak 'n Shake. He became chairman and CEO of the company in August that same year as Steak 'n Shake was losing $100,000 each day. By 2011 under Biglari, it was making $100,000 per day.

In 2019, Steak 'n Shake began franchising company-owned restaurants to select candidates for $10,000 and 50% of the profits. So far, 51 Steak 'n Shake franchise partners have come on board. Biglari hoped to hit 100 by year-end, and claimed that there were franchise owners in the program that were on their way to earning over $200,000 in their first year. In the third quarter of 2025, Steak 'n Shake led all restaurant chains with 15% growth in same store sales. The brand credited bitcoin for the surge in sales.

=== Cracker Barrel ===
Biglari Holdings bought 4.7 million shares of Cracker Barrel in 2011. In 2014, Harvard Business School professors Suraj Srinivasan and Tim Gray wrote a case study on Biglari and Cracker Barrel. Biglari's 14-year battle with Cracker Barrel has earned him $1 billion.

Biglari criticized the 2025 Cracker Barrel logo rebrand on social media.

=== Other holdings ===
On February 27, 2014, Biglari bought Maxim, commenting, "We plan to build the business on multiple dimensions, thereby energizing our readership and viewership." In January 2016, Biglari officially took over as editor-in-chief of Maxim, though a Maxim staffer said that the new masthead title just formalizes what has always been clear: Biglari exercises full editorial control over Maxim. At one point last year, the staffer said, he decided to throw out a nearly complete version of the December issue in order to completely redesign the magazine. On January 13, 2016, Gilles Bensimon joined Biglari as a special creative director. "What drew me to Maxim was Sardar's vision for the brand," said Bensimon.

As of 2023, Biglari personally owns 1.1 million shares of Jack in the Box in addition to the 1.1 million shares owned by Biglari Holdings.

Biglari began buying shares of Ferrari in 2022 and by 2024 owned 440,000 shares worth $187 million.
