= Steak 'n Shake =

American restaurant chain

Steak 'n Shake Operations, Inc.
- Logo since 2011
- Trade name: Steak 'n Shake
- Type: Subsidiary
- Industry: Fast food
- Founded: February 1934; 92 years ago, in Normal, Illinois, U.S.
- Founder: Augustus Hamilton "Gus" Belt
- Headquarters: Indianapolis, Indiana, United States
- Number of locations: 426 (2024)
- Area served: United States; France; Italy; Portugal; Monaco
- Key people: Sardar Biglari (chairman and CEO); Phillip Cooley
- Products: Steakburgers, milk shakes
- Services: Restaurants
- Number of employees: 20,732
- Parent: Biglari Holdings
- Website: steaknshake.com

Steak 'n Shake Operations, Inc., doing business as Steak 'n Shake, is an American fast food chain concentrated primarily in the Midwestern United States along with locations in the rest of the country plus locations in Western Europe. The company is headquartered in Indianapolis, Indiana, and is a wholly owned subsidiary of Biglari Holdings.

The menu features primarily burgers and hand-dipped milkshakes; other entrees including chocolate chip cookies, side items, and drinks are also available. The corporation's slogan, "Famous for Steakburgers," refers to its most prominent food item, the Steakburger. The "steak" in the restaurant name comes from the menu item. Most restaurant locations have a drive-through, in addition to indoor dining.

In 2018, there were 628 Steak 'n Shake restaurants. Of those, 414 were corporate-owned, and 214 franchised. The company has since attempted to convert to a fully franchised model.

In 2021, the company had 536 locations, but the number dropped to 493 by March 31, 2023, according to Biglari Holdings; not all of those were in operation at that time. The company has shifted away from full-service restaurants toward a drive-thru model and kiosk service.

By the end of 2024, the company had 426 company-operated and franchise locations in 26 states plus the District of Columbia. The company had also retreated from many of the states that it had expanded into during the first two decades of the 21st century.

== History ==
A. H. "Gus" Belt (born in Jerseyville, Illinois) founded Steak 'n Shake in Normal, Illinois, in February 1934, after serving four years in the United States Marine Corps. He converted the combination gas station and chicken restaurant that he owned (Shell's Chicken) into a hamburger stand.

Steak 'n Shake's slogan, "In Sight, It Must Be Right," originally referred to Belt's practice of wheeling a barrel of T-bone, sirloin, and round steaks into the public area of his restaurant, then grinding them into burgers in front of his customers — it was intended to reassure customers of the product's wholesomeness as at the time, ground beef was still viewed with skepticism by the general public, based on the likelihood of it having impurities deliberately added to it.

It also assured Belt's customers of the veracity of his "Steakburger" claim. Later patrons were assured that Steakburgers were still made from these ingredients "at our own commissary" for shipment to the restaurants, where the open grill line remained "in sight" to customers.

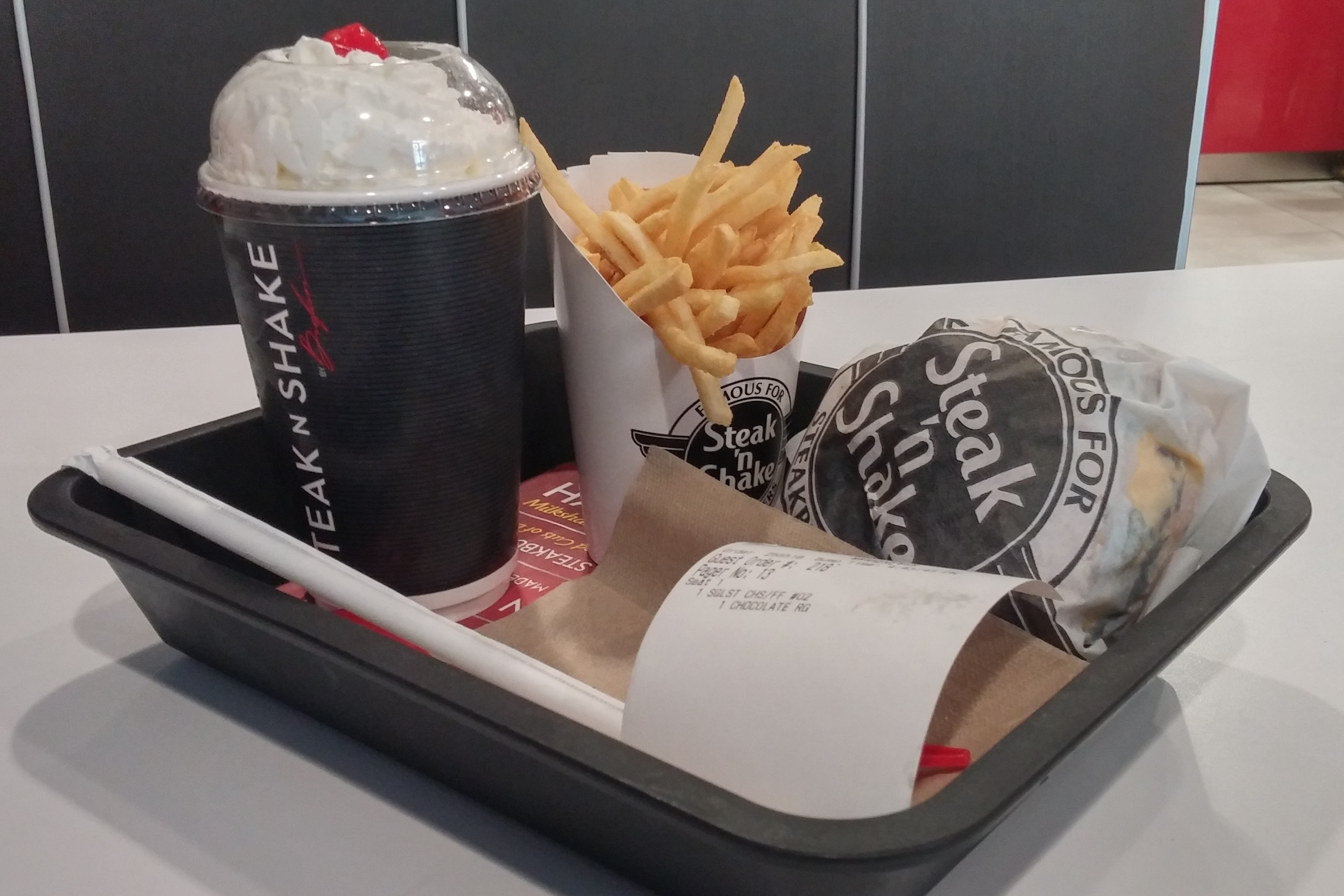
A combination meal from Steak 'n Shake restaurant

After having success, Belt purchased a chain of Goal Post restaurants throughout central Illinois, converting them to Steak 'n Shakes and added curb service.

The original building at the intersection of Main Street and West Virginia Avenue was damaged by a fire in the early 1960s but was repaired and its dining room expanded. In the late 1990s, Steak 'n Shake sold the building to the Monical's Pizza company.

=== After Gus Belt ===
Steak 'n Shake continued to expand throughout Illinois following Belt's death on August 20, 1954. Ownership passed through many hands, including Gus's wife Edith, who ran the chain until 1969; Longchamps, Inc., an East Coast steakhouse company that owned the chain from 1969 to 1971; and Indianapolis-based Franklin Corporation, led by Robert Cronin, author of Selling Steakburgers: The Growth of a Corporate Culture. After the acquisition, Franklin moved Steak 'n Shake's headquarters from Normal, Illinois to Indianapolis.

In 1981, Steak 'n Shake and its parent company Franklin were acquired by E. W. Kelley and Associates; the chairman E. W. "Ed" Kelley led the restaurant chain until he died on July 4, 2003.

=== Under Sardar Biglari ===
Entrepreneur Sardar Biglari took control of Steak 'n Shake in August 2008 after three years of declining same-store sales and losses of $100,000 per day. He led a turnaround which resulted in 24 straight quarters of increases in same-store sales and profits of $100,000 per day. He focused the brand on burgers, fries and milkshakes, reducing the menu from eight pages to a bi-fold. However the chain ran into more problems in 2016 and onward, with revenue declining sharply. Reasons included under-investment in the restaurants after the deep price cuts of 2008; competition from "fast casual" restaurants like Chipotle which aimed for a more high-class experience; and two expensive lawsuits from former managers who accused the chain of misclassifying them as salaried employees and refusing to pay earned overtime.

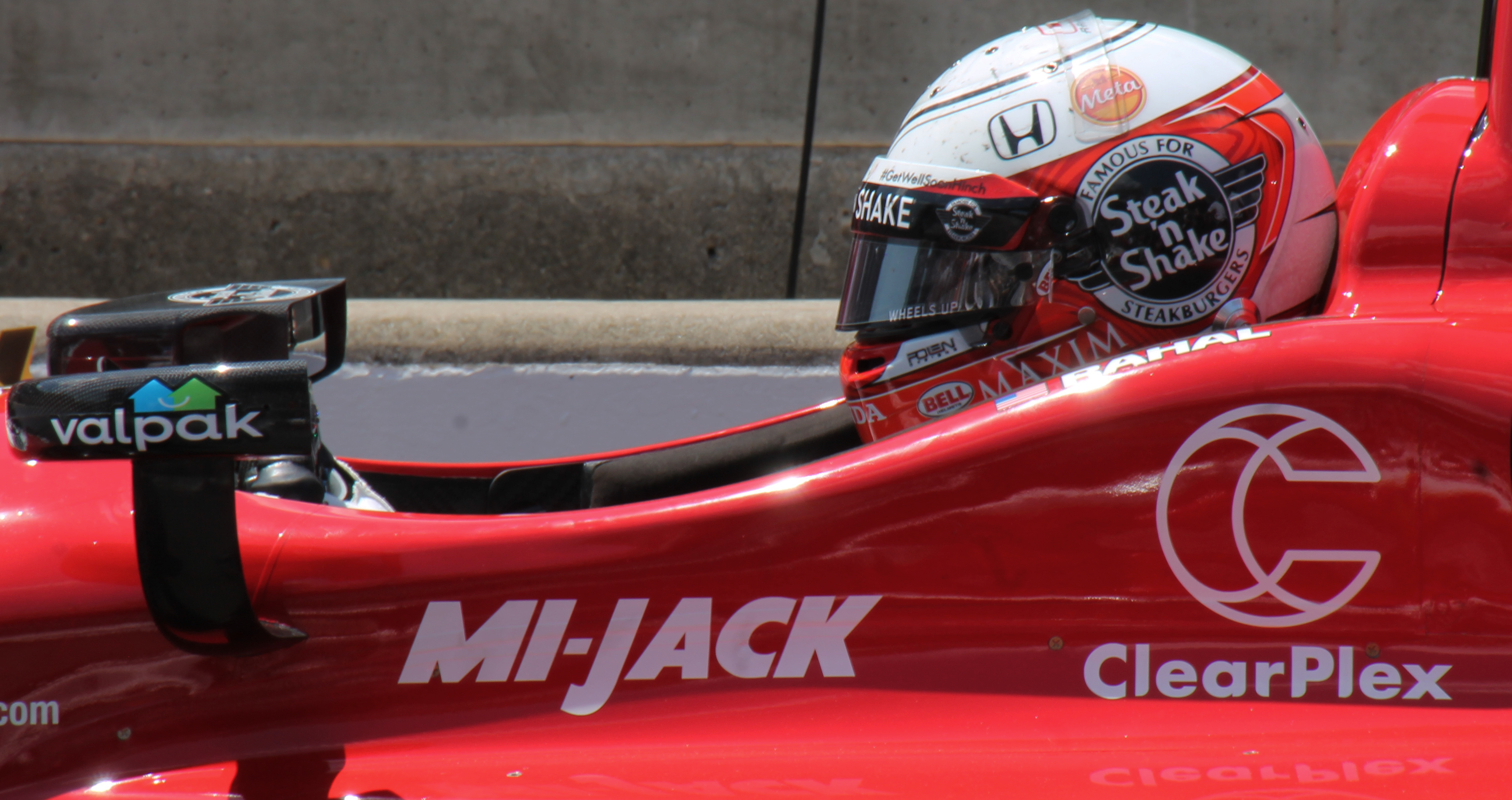
Graham Rahal's 2015 Indianapolis 500 IndyCar was sponsored by Steak 'n Shake.

In 2018, Steak 'n Shake changed its business model to a franchise partner system, with Biglari attempting to turn all of the 400+ company-owned restaurants into franchise operations. Entrepreneurial single-unit operators could take control of an existing Steak 'n Shake for $10,000, an unusually low price, but were required to give the company 50% of the restaurant's profits. Even though it offered the new franchise inducement, the firm remained heavily indebted. As of April 2020, its debt was rated as a low C/D "speculative" grade (colloquially known as junk bonds) by bond rating agencies. The Washington Post considered the chain to be extremely likely to default with a low likelihood of recovering, with the restaurant closings due to the COVID-19 pandemic in the United States being an unrecoverable blow to the firm.

In 2021, Steak N' Shake made a strategic decision to transition away from casual dining and become a fast food restaurant. Steak 'n Shake replaced lunch counters with self-serve kiosks in 2021 to improve efficiency and reduce costs. The chain estimated that remodeling and adding kiosks to each restaurant would cost between $100,000 and $200,000. Changing the service model allowed a significant reduction of store staff. According to management, the old casual dining model faced the challenge of long food preparation time and a cost structure that required paying wait staff. Long-term strategy is to empower customers to place and pick up their own orders.

In February 2025, Steak N' Shake announced it would start making fries with 100% beef tallow by March 1. This announcement was later praised publicly by US Health and Human Services Secretary Robert F. Kennedy Jr., who used it as an example of his "Make America Healthy Again" agenda, although it was criticized by health experts and scientists. In March, Steak N' Shake announced that by April 2, they would switch to 100% Grade A Wisconsin butter to replace their "buttery blend," which contained seed oils.

In May 2025, Steak N' Shake announced it would begin accepting Bitcoin as payment at all U.S. locations, which will eventually include "all international units" at a later date. On May 16, 2025, it began accepting Bitcoin payments at all U.S. locations using the Lightning network.

== Locations ==
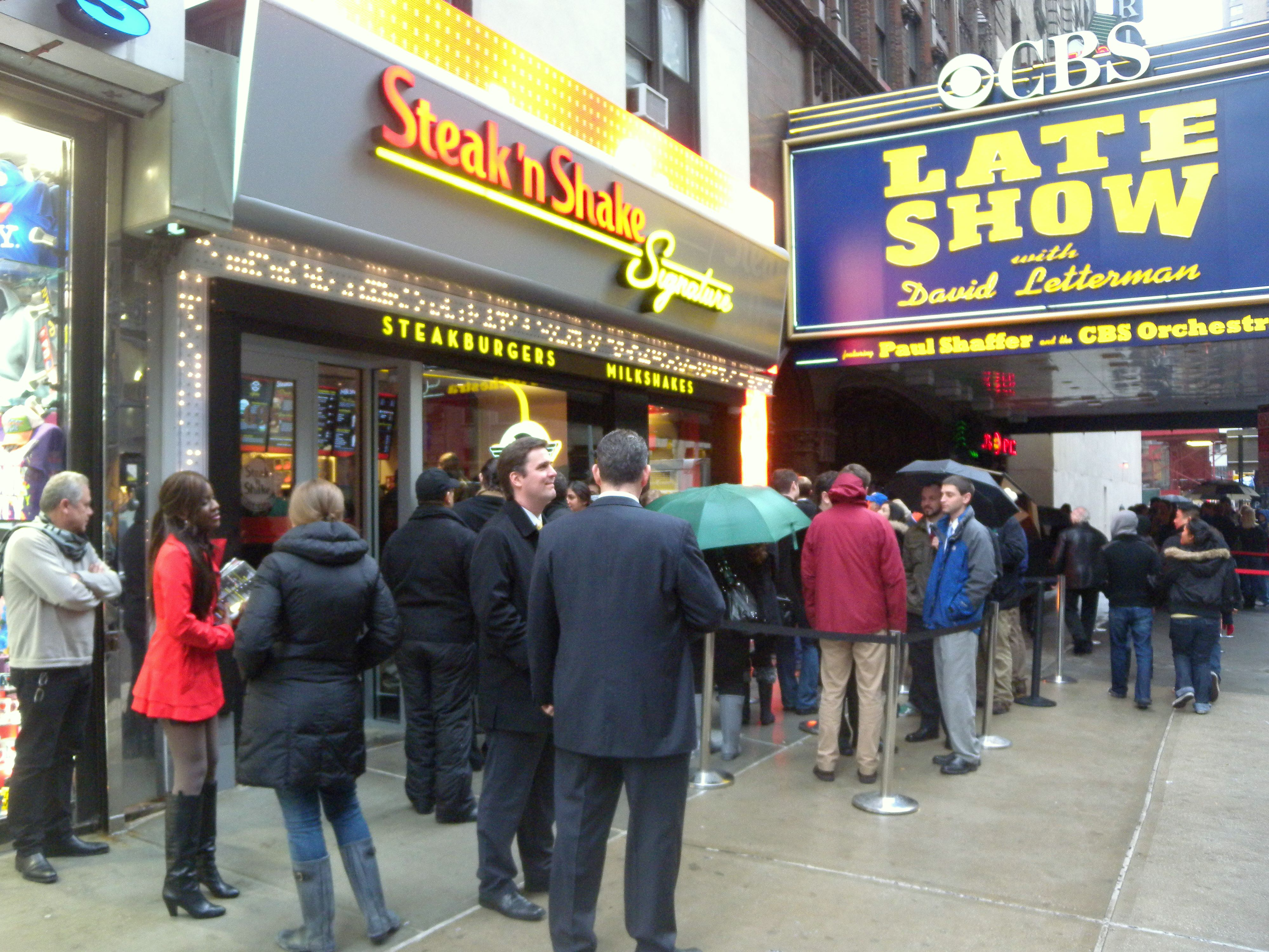
Opening of New York City location in 2012, which has since closed

The first Steak 'n Shake in the state of Indiana was opened as a drive-in restaurant in Indianapolis in November 1954. As typical for the era it had offered curb (carhop) service in addition to table service and takeout. At the time, Steak 'n Shake had locations in five states.

The Route 66 Steak 'n Shake in Springfield, Missouri (built 1962), was listed on the National Register of Historic Places in 2012.

The company entered North Carolina opening a franchised location in Greensboro in December 1996.

Steak 'n Shake's first Wisconsin locations were in Racine, Janesville, and Madison in the late 1990s, but all locations closed by 2004. Another franchiser opened locations in Waukesha and Wauwatosa in 2007, but both closed by 2010. The chain has not returned to the state.

After briefly operating a few restaurants in South Texas during the 1970s, Steak 'n Shake returned to Texas by opening locations in the Dallas–Fort Worth area in 2001, in the Houston area in 2012, and in the San Antonio area beginning in 2013. Steak 'n Shake entered South Carolina Carolina opening a location in Greenville in February 2001.

The company entered Oklahoma for the first time by opening a franchise location in Edmond in 2004.

Steak 'n Shake entered West Virginia for the first time by opening a franchise location in Barboursville in August 2007.

Steak 'n Shake opened its first location in Nevada inside the South Point Casino in Las Vegas in July 2010 and a second location in Reno in July 2013. In January 2017, a second Las Vegas location began, the third in Nevada, in the Student Union building on the campus of the University of Nevada, Las Vegas followed by a second Reno location, the fourth in Nevada in July 2017. Steak 'n Shake entered Louisiana for the first time by opening a location near Baton Rouge in Covington in 2011. The company first entered Colorado via a franchise in Denver in November 2011 before the parent company took over the Colorado locations after a lengthy lawsuit between the franchisee and the parent company. In January 2012, they opened their first and only location in the state of New York in Manhattan, adjacent to the Ed Sullivan Theater then home to the Late Show with David Letterman. Indiana native David Letterman, an avid Steak 'n Shake fan frequented the location and often talked about it on his show. The location closed in October 2017, ending the chain's five year presence in the state. The first location in New Jersey was opened by a franchise holder in September 2012 in Paramus. At the beginning of 2016, a second and third location in New Jersey were opened by the same franchisee in West Windsor Township and Hamilton Township; both of those locations quietly disappeared within a year. In September 2017, the original Paramus location, the last location in New Jersey, also closed after a five-year struggle to remain in business.

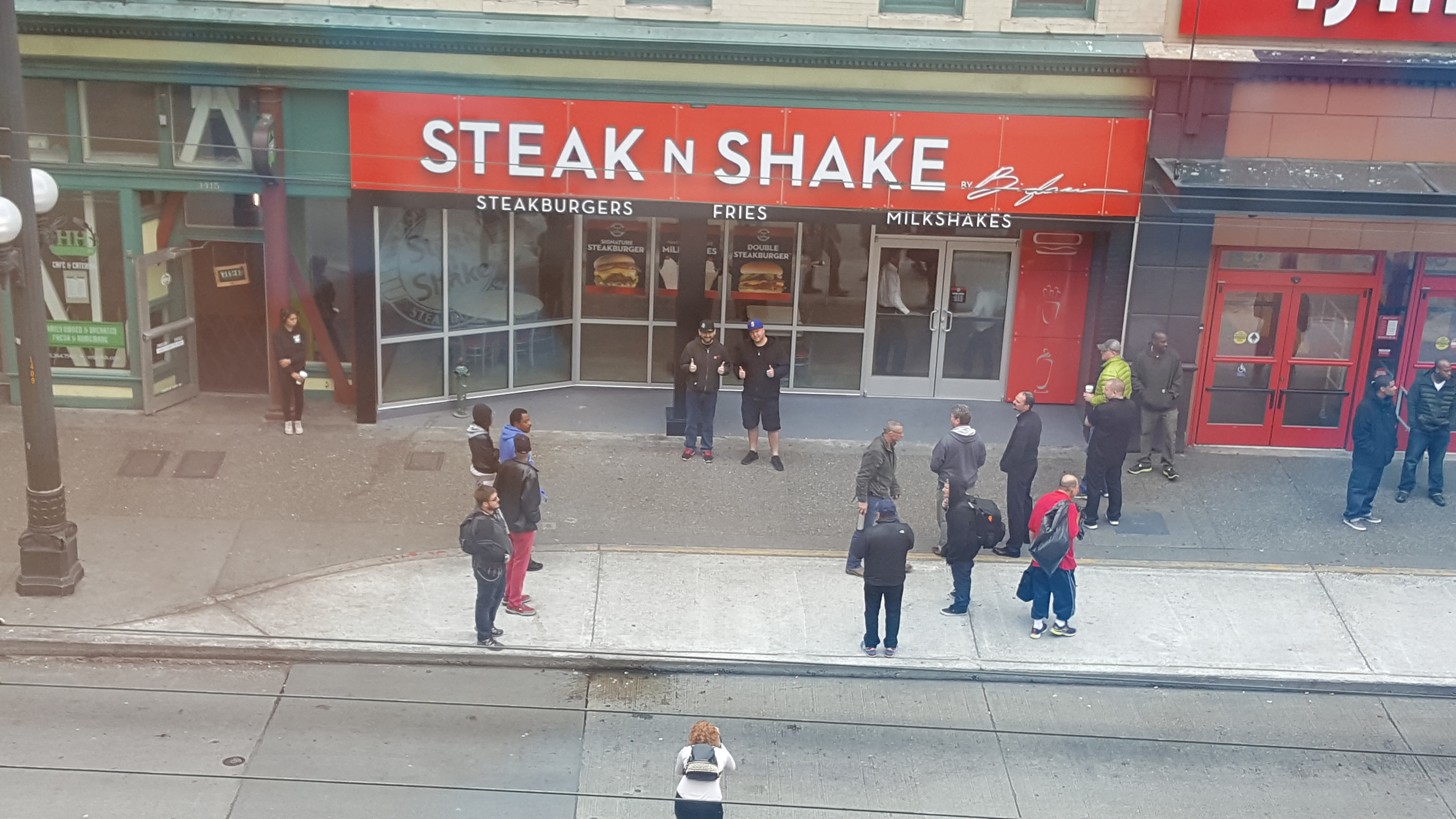
Opening of first store in Seattle in 2016, now defunct

The first Steak 'n Shake location in the state of Arizona was opened in Tempe in October 2013. A second Arizona location was open on the campus of the University of Arizona in Tucson in July 2017.

The first and only location in the state of Montana and in the upper plain states, was opened in Billings in December 2013. The restaurant was forced to close after two and a half years in July 2016 due to poor sales that were blamed on "harsh reviews on social media".

Steak 'n Shake expanded to California in July 2014 by opening a location in Victorville. A Los Angeles County location was opened in Santa Monica in late October and another in Burbank in December of the same year. After a lack of activity for over a year in the highly competitive California marketplace, the company announced in April 2016 it expected to open its first Orange County location, the fourth in California, in Aliso Viejo in mid-May. After a short delay, a fifth California location was opened behind schedule in Riverside in August 2016. In March 2017, a 6th location opened in Yucca Valley. After 3.5 years of operation, the Victorville location closed abruptly in February 2018 after receiving an eviction notice for failure to pay rent.

In 2015, the company planned a restaurant in Northern California in Campbell, California, but local residents raised issues and the project was postponed. Because of the delay, the first location in Northern California opened instead in Daly City in November 2016. The first Central California location began operating in Fresno in March 2017. A second San Francisco Bay Area restaurant was opened on the campus of San Jose State University in July 2017. After a two-year delay, the company opened their Campbell location in September 2017. After four months of operation, the Daly City location closed as well as the Campbell location in January 2018. This left the San Jose location on the campus of SJSU as the only store in the Bay Area. After 10 months of operation, the lone Central California location in Fresno also closed in January 2018.

In June 2015, the first location in Maryland opened in Millersville. Two years later, the struggling Maryland franchisee filed for voluntary bankruptcy in June 2017 while still remaining open. The location finally closed in January 2018 after the Circuit Court for Anne Arundel County seized the restaurant for non-payment on loans and taxes. The restaurant and contents were auctioned off by the court on January 31, 2018. Later in the year, the franchise owner was arrested after the FBI filed an indictment against the franchise owner for plotting to kill his wife and to burn the restaurant down in an attempt to receive insurance money for his then failing business. In January 2019, the restaurant reopened under new management. In April 2019, the same franchise owner of the Millersville location announced plans to open a second location in White Marsh by the summer of 2019.

The first location in the Pacific Northwest opened in Seattle in May 2016; it went defunct after four years.

In September 2018, the first location in Delaware was opened in Middletown.

In March 2019, the first location in Nebraska was opened on the campus of University of Nebraska–Lincoln.

In March 2019, Steak 'n Shake announced plans to open its first restaurant in Washington, D.C., inside the Rayburn House Office Building to serve House members, staffers, and the public who pass "through security and a metal detector". The location officially opened for business in the first week of September 2019. On January 11, 2021, the first Steak N Shake location in the Des Moines Suburb of West Des Moines opened, joining seven other stores in Iowa, with strict measures at that time including no eat-in dining to comply with local COVID-19 pandemic restrictions then in effect.

== International expansion ==
In December 2013, Steak 'n Shake opened a corporate office in Monte Carlo, Monaco, to support its expansion in West Asia and Europe.

=== West Asia ===
In October 2012, Steak 'n Shake announced its first international expansion agreement with plans to open forty locations in the United Arab Emirates. The first of these locations opened in Dubai in 2013, but closed in a little more than a year. Only two out of the original 40 locations planned were ever opened in the UAE. Both closed in January 2015.

The brand also announced in December 2013 a 50-unit franchise agreement in Saudi Arabia with AB Holdings. The first location in Riyadh was expected to open in the first half of 2014. The company's Saudi Arabian website was last active in September 2017.

The first location in the Persian Gulf country of Kuwait was opened in December 2014. This location appeared to have been closed after less than three years of operation.

The first location in Qatar opened at the Tawar Mall in November 2017. The fate of the company's only location in Qatar is not known since there has been no verifiable news source has reported on the closing of this location.

By 2025, there are no records of a Steak 'n Shake restaurant operating in West Asia or anywhere in the Arabic speaking world.

=== Europe ===
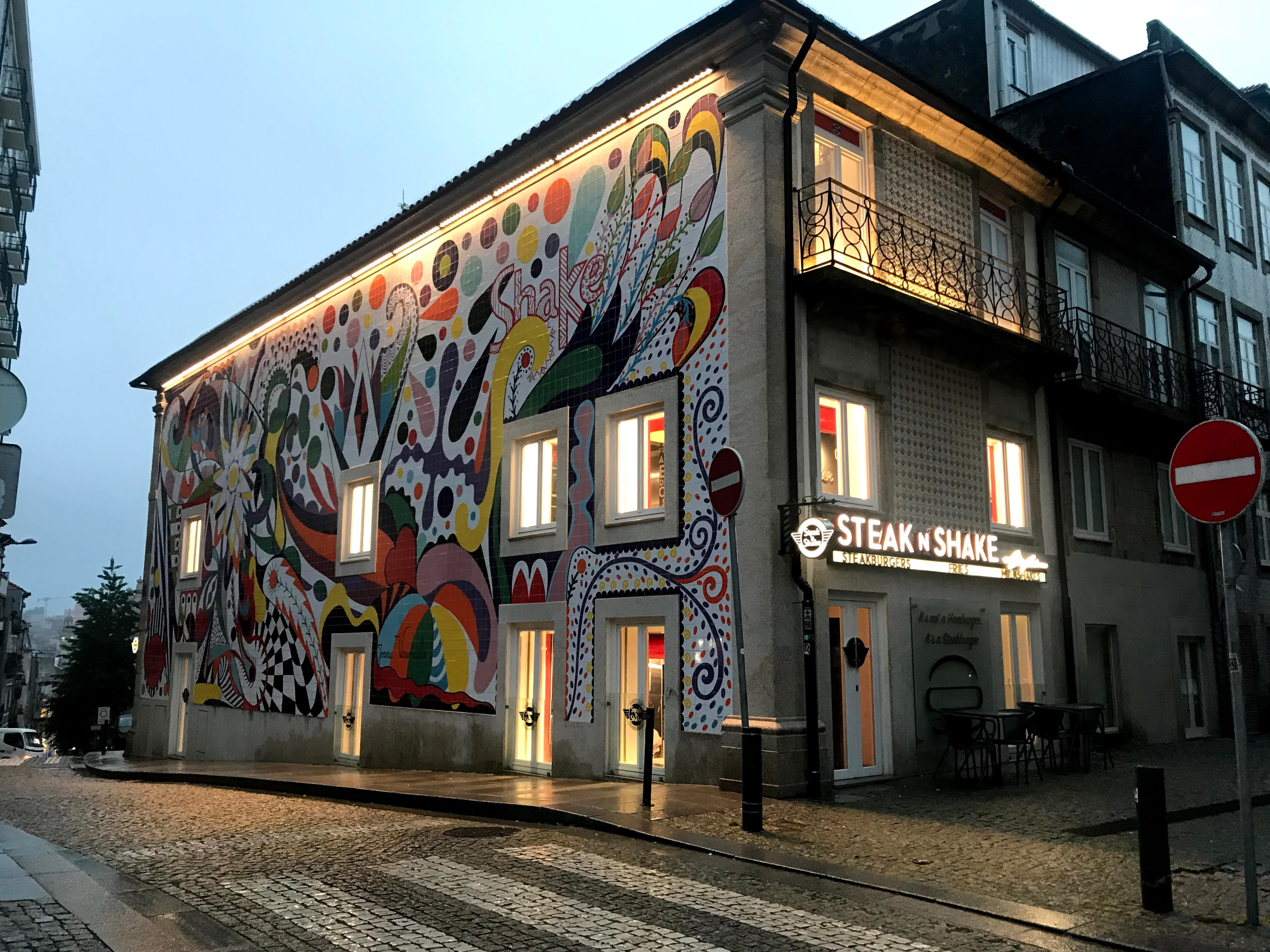
Steak 'n Shake with mural by Joana Vasconcelos in Porto, Portugal (2018)

The first two European locations opened in Cannes, France, in May 2014 and on the island of Ibiza in Spain in June 2014.

The second location in France was opened in Marseille in December 2014. A third location in France was opened in Toulon in April 2016 and was quickly followed in June by the openings of a fourth and fifth location in Caen and Rueil-Malmaison respectively, in October by the openings of a sixth location at the Cité Europe shopping centre in Coquelles, and in November of a seventh location in Fenouillet. The eighth and ninth location in France were started in Bordeaux and Anglet respectively in early 2017. A second location in Marseille was opened in December 2017. A third location in Marseille, the 17th location in France, was opened in May 2018. In June 2025, the company's French website reported that there were X locations in France.

The second location in Spain was opened in Madrid, the capital, in September 2015 followed by one in Churra, Murcia, in October 2015. There are no verifiable records when the Spanish locations had closed. The company's Spanish website was last active in January 2019.

The first location in Italy opened in Milan in December 2015. A second location was opened in Peschiera del Garda in May 2016. A third location was opened in Castione Andevenno in September 2016. In June 2025, the company's Italian website reported that there were four locations in Italy.

In July 2016, the first location in Portugal opened in Montijo, near Lisbon (closed in 2023). In June 2025, the company's Portuguese website reported that there were four locations in Portugal.

In December 2016, the first store in the United Kingdom opened in Chester, Cheshire, England. The only location in the UK was closed 21 months later in August 2018.

The first Steak 'n Shake restaurant in the Principality of Monaco was opened in August 2020.

== Sponsorships ==
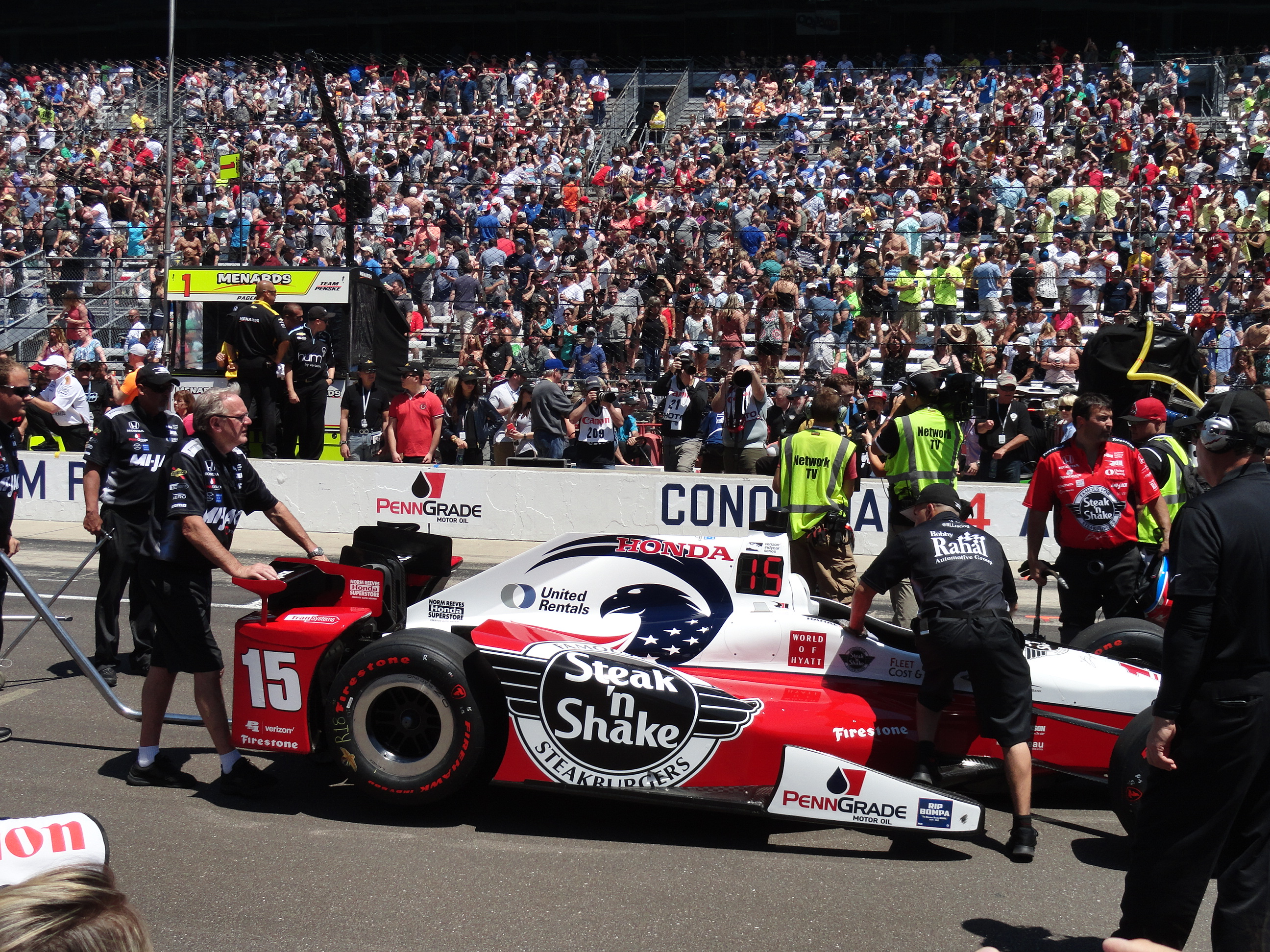
Graham Rahal's Indy car (2017)

In 2010, Steak 'n Shake began NBA sponsorship of the Indiana Pacers and the Indiana Fever professional basketball teams.

In 2015, Steak 'n Shake began sponsoring an Indy car for the first time in its 81-year history, a car driven by Graham Rahal of Rahal Letterman Lanigan Racing.

== Political involvement ==
In 2024, Steak 'n Shake started marketing heavily to conservatives in the MAGA movement. Posts on the company's social media aligned the brand with Tesla and Robert F. Kennedy Jr., while the CEO appeared on Fox News to promote the beef tallow fries. In August 2025, the company announced that they would begin offering Coca-Cola with cane sugar, in place of high fructose corn syrup; this followed the second Trump administration's push to use cane sugar in Coca-Cola.

In 2026, the company endorsed Republican candidate Zach Lahn in the 2026 Iowa gubernatorial election. Additionally, the company promoted Tesla Tallow Tuesday on September 1, 2026. This promotion was rolled out at all Steak 'n Shake locations and stated that all Tesla drivers receive a free small order of beef-tallow fries and a complimentary jar of beef tallow cooking oil.

== Controversies ==
=== Franchise pricing lawsuits ===
Between 2010 and 2015, Steak 'n Shake became involved in lawsuits with several of its franchisees concerning mandatory menu prices and mandatory food sourcing. As of August 2013, five lawsuits had been filed. The first lawsuit began in 2010; it was filed by Stuller, Inc., the Illinois franchisee that is the oldest franchisee in Steak 'n Shake's history. Stuller won a preliminary injunction that went to the 7th Circuit Court of Appeals in August 2012. Three more franchisees filed suit in April 2013—Druco Restaurants based in St. Louis, People Sales & Profit Co. based in Georgia, and Scott's S&S Inc. in Pennsylvania. A settlement was reached with these franchisees in 2014, but terms of the settlement were not made public.

Steak 'n Shake filed suit against Denver franchisees Larry and Christopher Baerns in July 2013 over the same issues, with a counterclaim soon after. Steak 'n Shake won its lawsuit in U.S. District Court against the Baerns when the judge ruled that the Baerns intentionally overcharged customers. The complaints by the franchisees also question whether Steak 'n Shake promised franchise results that could never actually be achieved under its policies.

=== Employee classification lawsuits ===
286 managers in the St. Louis area filed and won a lawsuit against Steak 'n Shake on grounds that they were misclassified as exempt employees unable to earn overtime. Steak 'n Shake had to pay $7.7 million in damages. They were sued again by an even larger group of 1100+ managers on similar grounds; as of 2019, that case was pending.

== See also ==
- List of hamburger restaurants
