= Suraj Srinivasan =

American economist

Suraj Srinivasan is an American economist currently the Philip J. Stomberg Professor of Business Administration at Harvard Business School. Srinivasan graduated from Birla Institute of Technology and Science, Pilani, Indian Institute of Management Calcutta, and Harvard Business School.
