= Biglari Holdings =

American holding company headquartered in San Antonio, Texas, US

Biglari Holdings Inc.
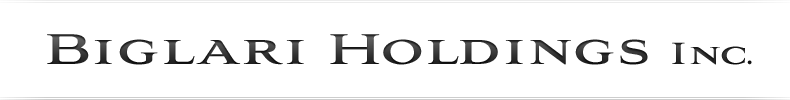
- Type: Public
- Traded as: NYSE: BH.A (Class A); NYSE: BH (Class B); S&P 600 Component (BH); Russell 2000 Index Component (BH.A)
- Industry: Conglomerate
- Founded: 2008
- Headquarters: San Antonio, Texas, United States
- Key people: Sardar Biglari (Founder)
- Revenue: ▲US$395 million (2025)
- Net income: ▼ −US$37.5 million (2025)
- Subsidiaries: Steak 'n Shake; Western Sizzlin'; Maxim; First Guard Insurance; Southern Pioneer Property and Casualty Insurance; Southern Oil of Louisiana; Abraxas Petroleum
- Website: www.biglariholdings.com

Biglari Holdings Inc. is an American holding company headquartered in San Antonio, Texas, founded by entrepreneur Sardar Biglari. Its subsidiaries include Steak 'n Shake, Maxim magazine, First Guard Insurance, Southern Pioneer Insurance, Southern Oil, Abraxas Petroleum and Western Sizzlin'.

== Steak n Shake ==
In August 2008, Biglari took over Steak n Shake, which had been “losing more than $100,000 a day in 2009 to making more than $100,000 a day in 2010, according to Biglari’s 2010 letter to shareholders.” By 2015, the company had attained 24 consecutive quarters of same-store sales increases under Biglari. However, for fiscal 2017 and 2018, the Steak n Shake division had returned to same-store sales contraction. The company is now selling “franchises” claiming they will split profits 50% / 50% with the investors who put in $10,000.

== Maxim ==
On February 27, 2014, Maxim magazine was bought by Biglari who commented, "We plan to build the business on multiple dimensions, thereby energizing our readership and viewership." In January 2016, Biglari officially took over as editor-in-chief of Maxim, though a Maxim staffer said that the new masthead title just formalizes what has always been clear: Biglari exercises full editorial control over Maxim. At one point last year, the staffer said, he decided to throw out a nearly complete version of the December issue in order to completely redesign the magazine. On January 13, 2016, Gilles Bensimon joined Biglari as a special creative director. "What drew me to Maxim was Sardar's vision for the brand," said Bensimon.

== First Guard Insurance ==
On March 19, 2014, Biglari purchased Florida-based First Guard Insurance Company. First Guard Founder and CEO Ed Campbell said: "I couldn't imagine a better, more fitting owner of First Guard."

== Southern Pioneer Property and Casualty Insurance ==
In 2020, Biglari acquired Southern Pioneer Property & Casualty Insurance Co. from the Hyneman family who will continue to operate the company. Since 1981, Southern Pioneer has grown from $500,000 in capital and surplus and zero premium to over $18,000,000 capital and surplus with written premium in excess of $24,000,000 in 2015.

== Oil and gas operations ==
In September 2019, Biglari acquired Southern Oil of Louisiana Inc. for $51.5 million.

In 2022, Biglari acquired 90% of the voting power of San Antonio-based Abraxas Petroleum for $80 million.

== Jack in the Box ==
Biglari Holdings owns 1.1 million shares of Jack in the Box as of 2023.

== Ferrari ==
In 2022, Biglari acquired 360,000 shares of Ferrari. By 2023, the ownership had grown to 402,000 shares with a market value of $135 million.
