= Gary Gannaway =

American business executive

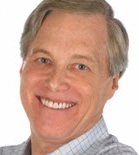
- Gannaway at the 2009 Digital Hollywood
- Born: Albert Carlyle Gannaway III; July 30, 1954 (age 72); Los Angeles, California, U.S.
- Occupations: Chairman & CEO, Gannaway Holdings
- Children: Samantha Gannaway Walton Alexis Gannaway
- Father: Albert Carlyle Gannaway II

Gary Gannaway (born Albert Carlyle Gannaway III on July 30, 1954) is an American businessman, entrepreneur, and philanthropist. Gannaway received the Entrepreneur of the Year Award from Merrill Lynch, Ernst & Young and Inc. magazine in its inaugural year.

== Early life ==
Gannaway was born Albert Carlyle Gannaway III in Los Angeles, California on July 30, 1954, the son of Albert Carlyle Gannaway Jr. and Dana Gibson Gannaway. Albert was a businessman. He controlled Gannaway Corporation and produced several well known motion picture films, including the series that made Country Music world famous, The Grand Ole Opry. Albert Gannaway II media library includes many legendary country music stars including Chet Atkins, Marty Robbins, June Carter, Minnie Pearl, Jimmy Dickens, and many others. Albert was the first to produce a television series using 35mm color film when television was exclusively in black and white. Albert was a famous songwriter who wrote with Johnny Mercer. Albert wrote songs for artists such as Nat King Cole, Bob Hope, Frankie Lane, Frank Sinatra, and many others.

His mother, Dana Gannaway, is a former Vogue model and Budweiser Girl.

Gannaway is best known for the Grand Ole Opry. The footage and rights his two grandchildren own. From his father, Gary learned the fundamentals of business.

Gannaway attended Castle Heights Military Academy followed by three years of service in the Marine Corps. In 1974, Gannaway was one of 18 men in the Marines Elite Force Recon.

== Career ==
=== Early career ===
After the Marines, Gannaway joined Metromedia Producers Corporation.

In June 1980, Gannaway left Metromedia to start his first company selling his father's show, Country Classics. He went on to sell Time-Life shows as well, including G.I. Diary and Wild, Wild World of Animals. His experience selling syndication led to Gannaway founding Genesis Entertainment less than three years later with his own capital.

=== Genesis Entertainment ===
In 1982, Gannaway founded Genesis Entertainment. It is the only company to have launched all pilots and shows it brought to the marketplace. The company owned the rights to Marvel, National Geographic,The Marvel Action Hour, The Whoopi Goldberg Show, National Geographic Specials, Access Hollywood, Spider-Man, Highway to Heaven, Grand Ole Opry Stars of the 50s, CBS' Top Cop, The Judge, Biker Mice from Mars, Paradise Beach, Real Stories of the Highway Patrol, HBO's Tales from The Crypt, ABC's Emergency Call, among others. Genesis sold more advertising than any Hollywood Studio. It is the only company to launch 100 percent of its pilots in an industry where, at the time, only 3 percent of TV pilots made it to series. Genesis was the first syndication company to provide co-op dollars to stations, which were then used to help promote the show.

Gannaway introduced the marketing concept of bartering off-network series in the late afternoon/early evening timeslot with Highway to Heaven in 1989. Instead of paying Genesis in cash, stations would get seven minutes of local advertising per episode and give Genesis five. A number of major series adapted Gannaway model, now an industry standard, including Columbia Pictures Television's hit sitcom Designing Women and Warner Bros. Television's Family Matters have been marketed on a barter basis. Gannaway's marketing efforts and contributions helped Genesis become the largest suppliers of national syndication ad units in the early 1990s. During the 1992-93 TV season, Genesis sold 9,412 30-second spots to national advertisers.

On May 21, 1993, Gannaway merged Genesis with Ronald Perelman later selling the company for 3 Billion to 20th Century FOX 13 months later.

=== WorldNow ===
Gannaway founded Worldnow which became the leading provider of digital content management and monetization platforms, recognized for its patent-pending Studio Gateway platform, which unifies linear and digital workflow. Gannaway founded Worldnow seeing television companies' inevitable shift the digital world. Gannaway beat out its competittors such as ABC, CBS, FOX, and NBC, which provided hardware solutions. Gannaway pioneered a cloud software solution, which is now known as cloud- based computing, along with a new business model, now called software as a service (SaaS). Gannaway's different business approach drove Worldnow's success, which later put his competitors out of business and turned them into clients. Today, all media companies use cloud and SaaS - a concept Worldnow brought to market in 1998. It is now industry standard.

WorldNow's proprietary technology provides media companies the digital tools for all digital and streaming platforms. The patented technology the company developed is a cloud-based, Saas, Paas, IaaS platform that unifies all digital systems into one. It is the only company to develop and integrate its video platform with its content management system (CMS).

Gannaway's company advertising arm became the largest Google advertising client. When Gannaway founded Worldnow, he took page out of his former company, Genesis, and kept half the digital advertising inventory and charged a license fee. On October 7, 2013, the company and Google held a joint conference. In 2015, Worldnow was ranked in the Top 50 largest digital platforms by comScore media matrix - ahead of giants such as Disney and the second fastest growing media company. The company reached over 92% of households and over 100 million monthly unique visitors.

In 2015, Gannaway sold the company to SK Telecom. Gannaway is known for self-funding his companies. Gannaway’s awards include Merrill Lynch and Ernst & Young Entrepreneur of the Year.

== Awards, recognition and achievement ==
Merrill Lynch, Ernst & Young, and Inc. named Gannaway "Entertainment Entrepreneur of the Year". It was the first time the trio had ever named an Entrepreneur of the Year from the entertainment business.

Gannaway sat on the board of Johns Hopkins. During this time, Gannaway co-pioneered and funded hypertonic solution to break up brain clots, now considered industry-standard.

In 2009 Gannaway was chosen by Wharton University to participate in its Entrepreneur-in-Residence program, mentoring undergraduates and MBA candidates then considering careers as entrepreneurs.

In January 2015 WorldNow received top honors for its innovation and product advancement by the Business Intelligence Group. Worldnow was awarded for its patent-pending Studio Gateway platform.
