= List of buffet restaurants =

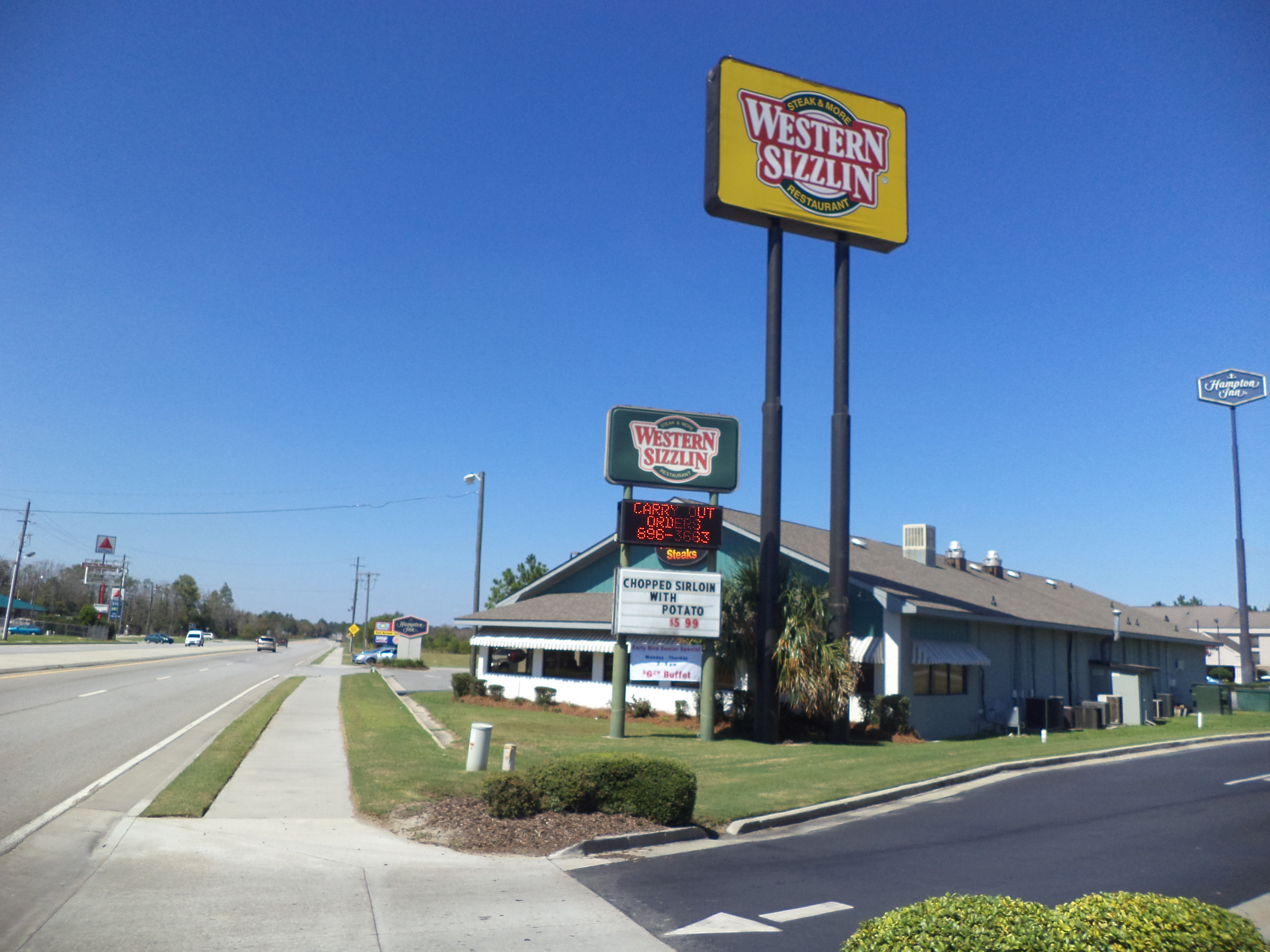
A Western Sizzlin' location in Adel, Georgia

This is a list of notable buffet restaurants. A buffet is a system of serving meals in which food is placed in a public area where the diners generally serve themselves. Buffets are offered at various places including hotels and many social events. Buffets usually have some hot dishes, so the term "cold buffet" (see Smörgåsbord) has been developed to describe formats lacking hot food.

== Buffet restaurants ==
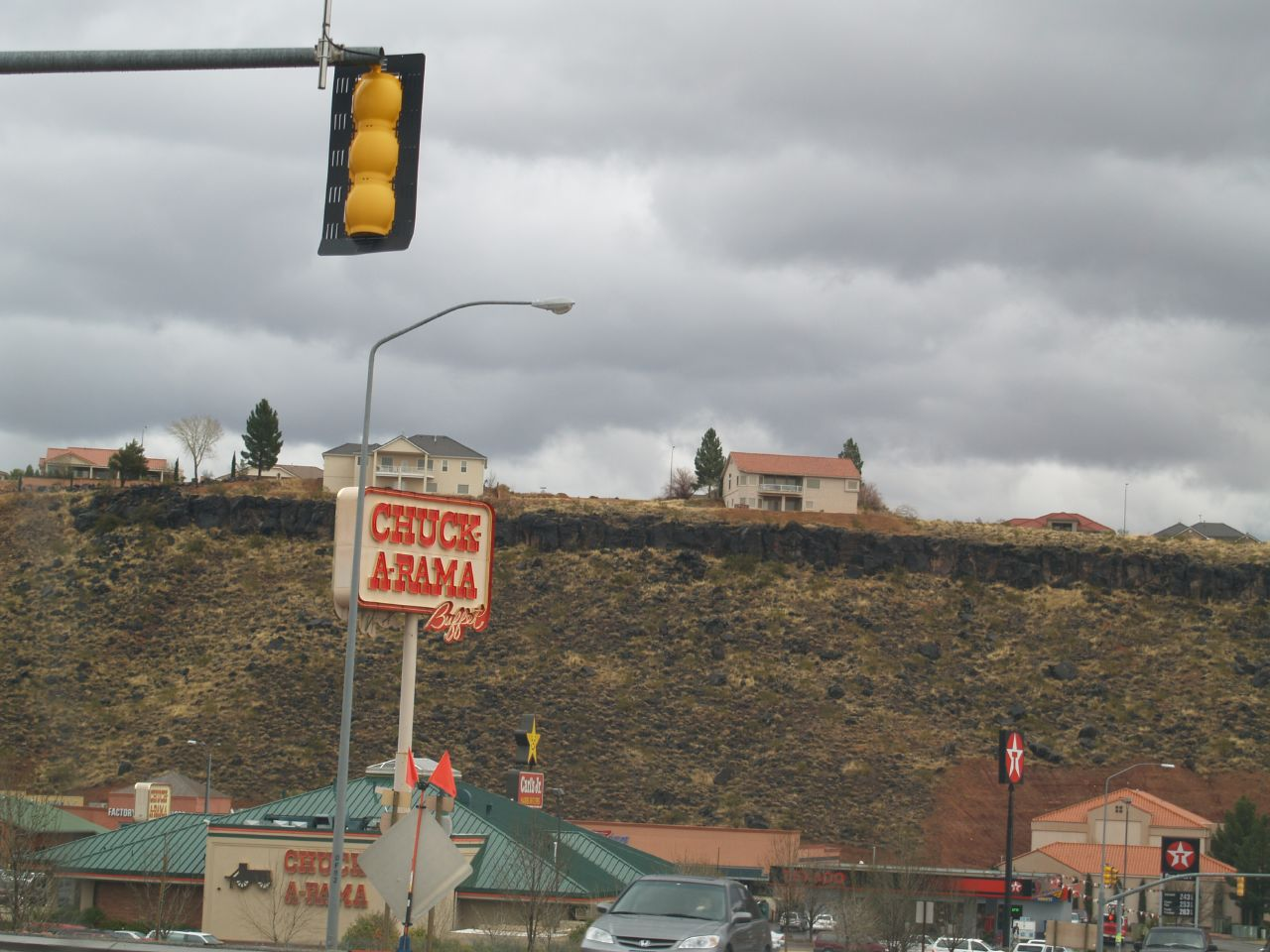
A Chuck-A-Rama location in St. George, Utah

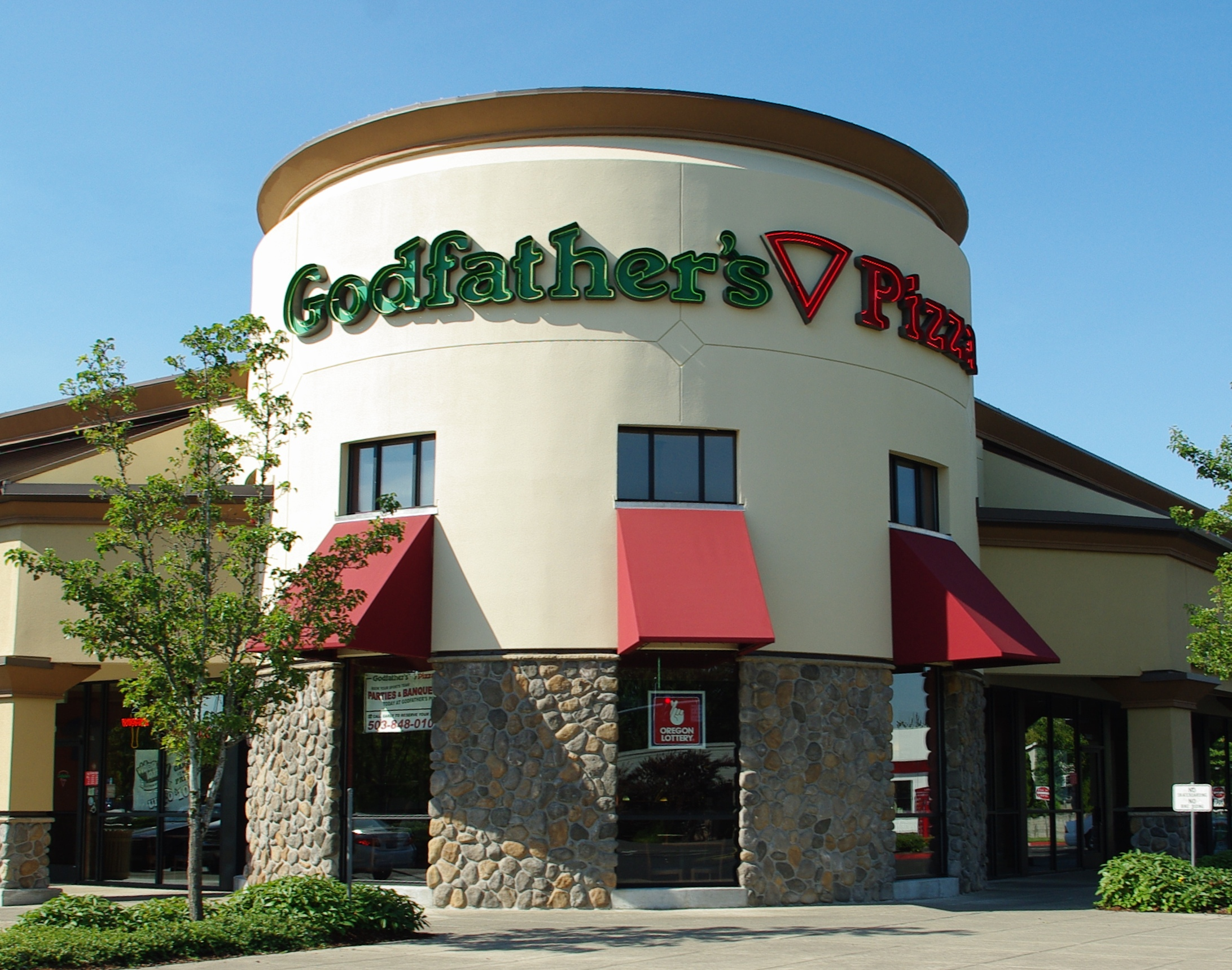
A Godfather's Pizza location in Hillsboro, Oregon

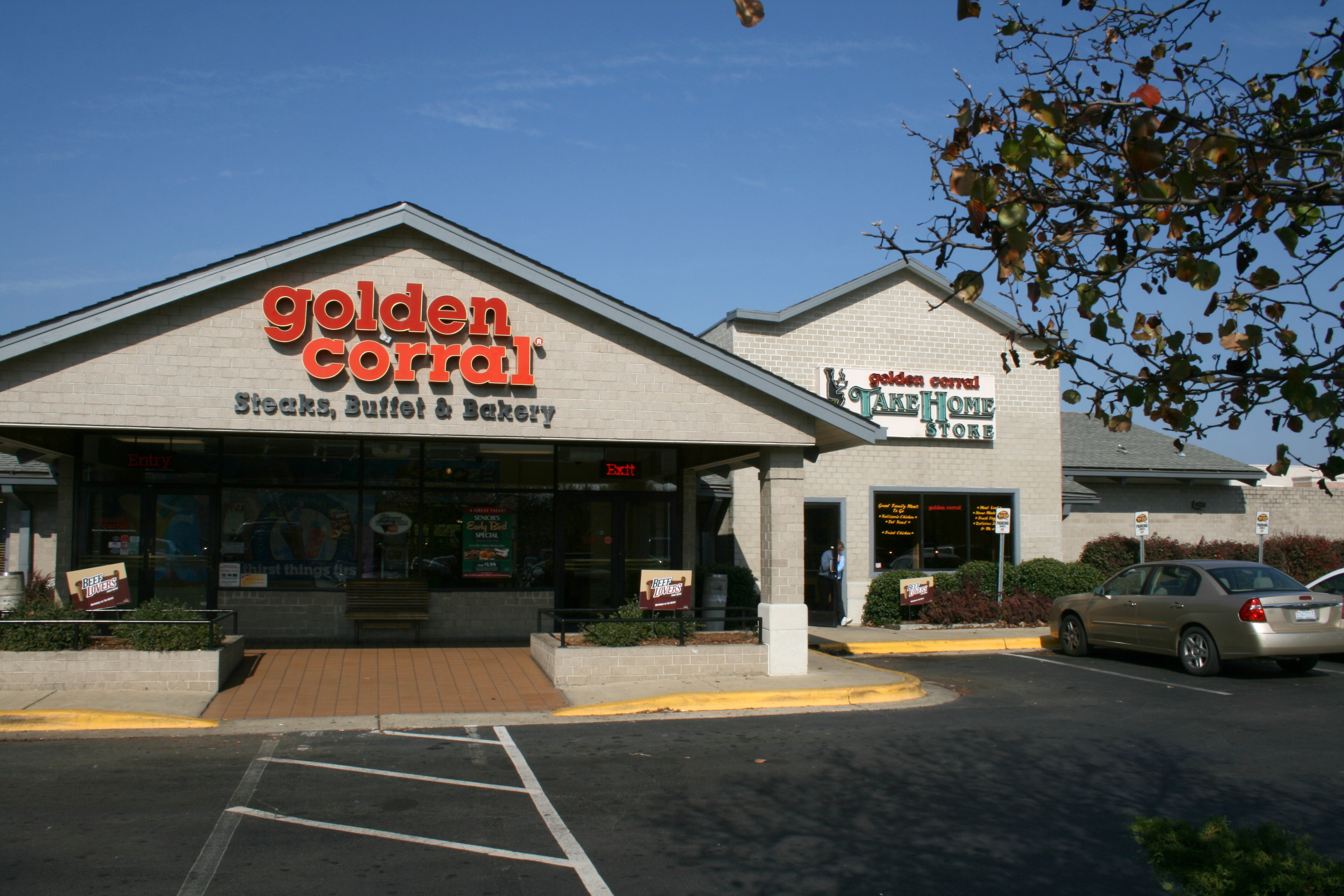
A former Golden Corral location in Durham, North Carolina

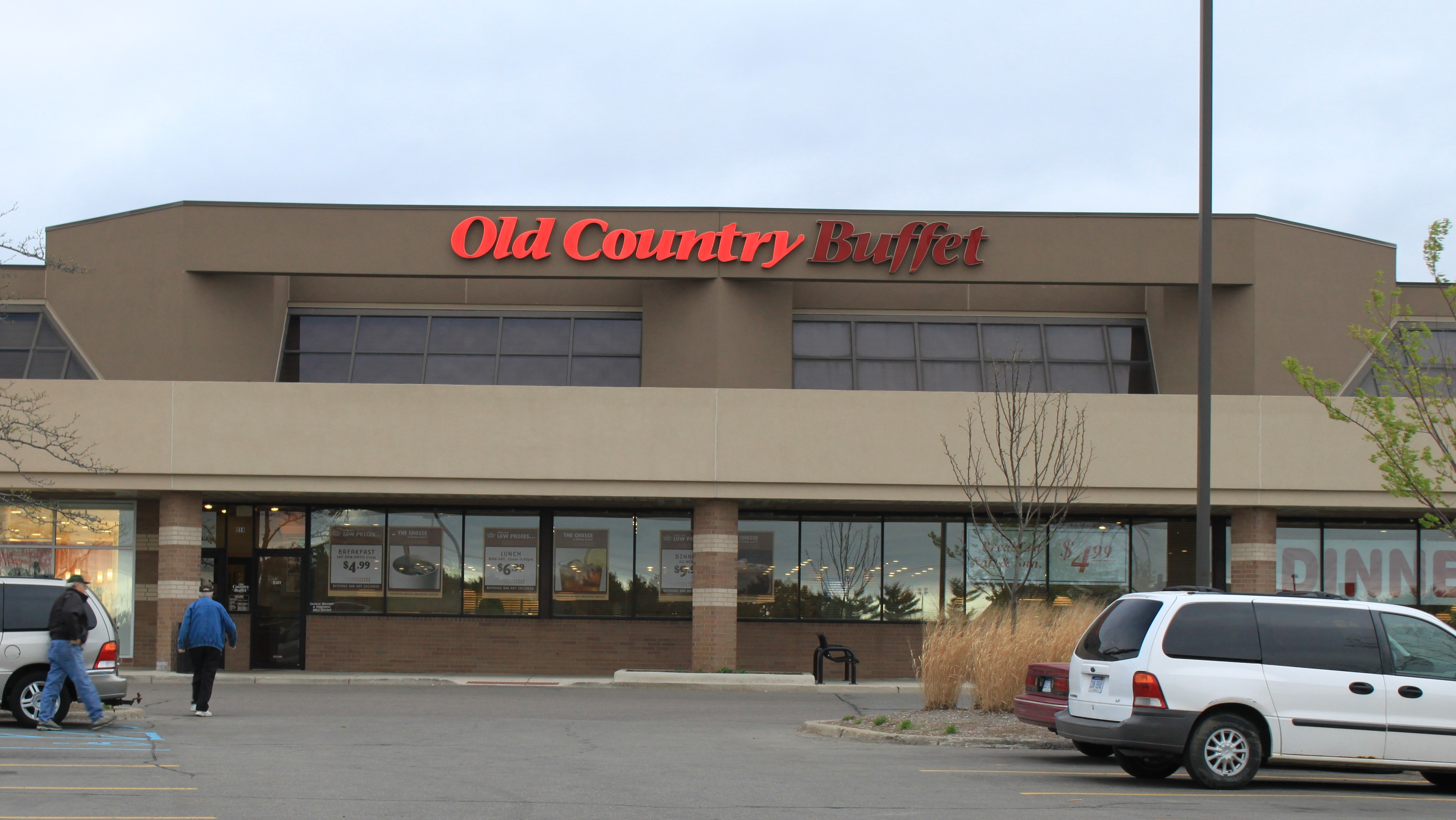
A former Old Country Buffet location in Ann Arbor, Michigan

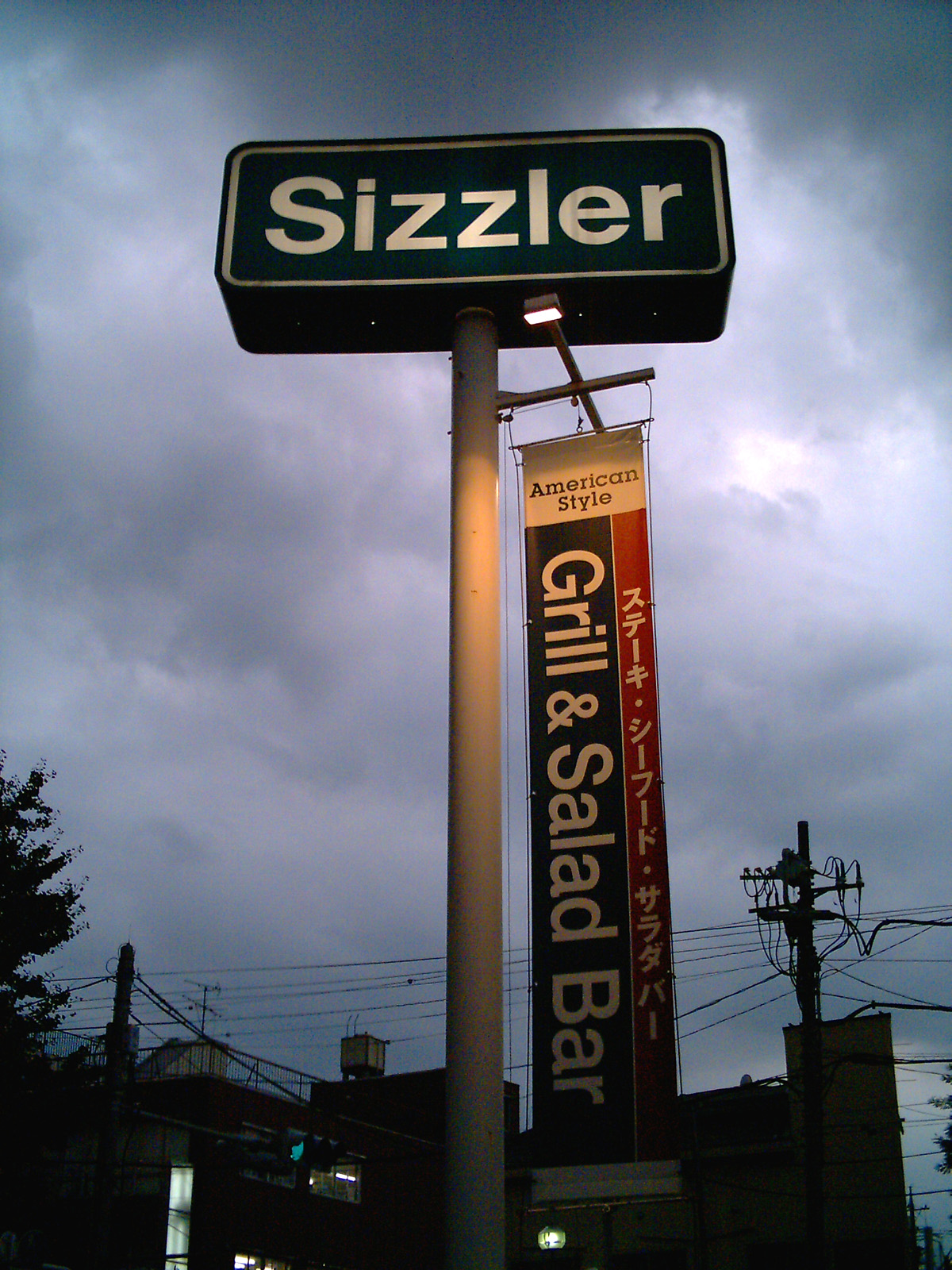
Sizzler in Musashino, Japan

- America's Incredible Pizza Company – an American restaurant chain based in Springfield, Missouri, the restaurants are pizza buffets and entertainment centers
- Cabalen – a Philippine buffet restaurant chain primarily serving traditional Filipino entrees
- Chuck-A-Rama – a chain of buffet restaurants based in Salt Lake City, Utah with a focus upon American comfort food and meat entrees.
- Chuck E. Cheese – some locations include a buffet
- Cicis – an American buffet restaurant chain based in Irving, Texas specializing in pizza
- Cosmo – a chain of 19 buffet restaurants in the United Kingdom
- Gatti's Pizza – a Southeastern United States pizza-buffet chain
- Giovanni's Pizza
- Godfather's Pizza – some locations
- Golden Corral
- Happy Joe's – some locations have a buffet
- Hoss's Steak and Sea House
- HuHot Mongolian Grill – an American restaurant chain specializing in a create-your-own stir fry cuisine
- KFC – some locations include a buffet
- Les Grands Buffets- Narbonne, France. Inspired by Auguste Escoffier. Has a Guinness World Record for the most cheeses (over 111) in one restaurant.
- Mandarin Restaurant
- 10 Pots Steamboat & Grill
- Moo Moo Restaurant
- Miller's Smorgasbord
- Pancho's Mexican Buffet
- Peter Piper Pizza
- Pizza Hut – full-size restaurants have a lunch buffet
- Pizza Inn
- Pizza Ranch
- Ponderosa and Bonanza Steakhouses
- Round Table Pizza – some locations have a buffet
- Shady Maple Smorgasbord
- Shakey's Pizza
- Shoney's
- Sirloin Stockade
- Sizzler
- Souper Salad
- Souplantation, also known as Sweet Tomatoes (formerly defunct)
- Tahoe Joe's
- The Nordic
- Valentino's
- Western Sizzlin' – previously known as Austin's Steaks & Saloon
- Za Za Bazaar

=== Defunct ===
- The Attic – a former 1,200 seat Smörgåsbord restaurant in West Vancouver, British Columbia, that was open from 1968 to 1981
- Fresh Choice – a former chain of buffet-style restaurants which operated in California, Washington, and Texas under the names Fresh Choice, Fresh Plus, Fresh Choice Express, and Zoopa
- Furr's – a chain of family restaurants in the United States. For many decades Furr's was known for cafeteria-style dining, but has since redeveloped into buffet-style dining.
- Ovation Brands – owned several American national chains of buffet restaurants, including Ryan's Grill, Buffet and Bakery, HomeTown Buffet and Old Country Buffet
- Swagman Restaurant – a former restaurant in Ferntree Gully, Melbourne, Australia, which opened in 1972 and burnt down in 1991
- Taybarns – a former British low cost all-you-can-eat restaurant chain owned by Whitbread

== See also ==
- Buffet
- Cafeteria
- Conveyor belt sushi
- Dim sum
- List of cafeterias
- List of casual dining restaurant chains
- Lists of restaurants
- Mongolian barbecue
- Salad bar
- Types of restaurant
