= America's Incredible Pizza Company =

Pizza franchise

Incredible Pizza Co., Inc.

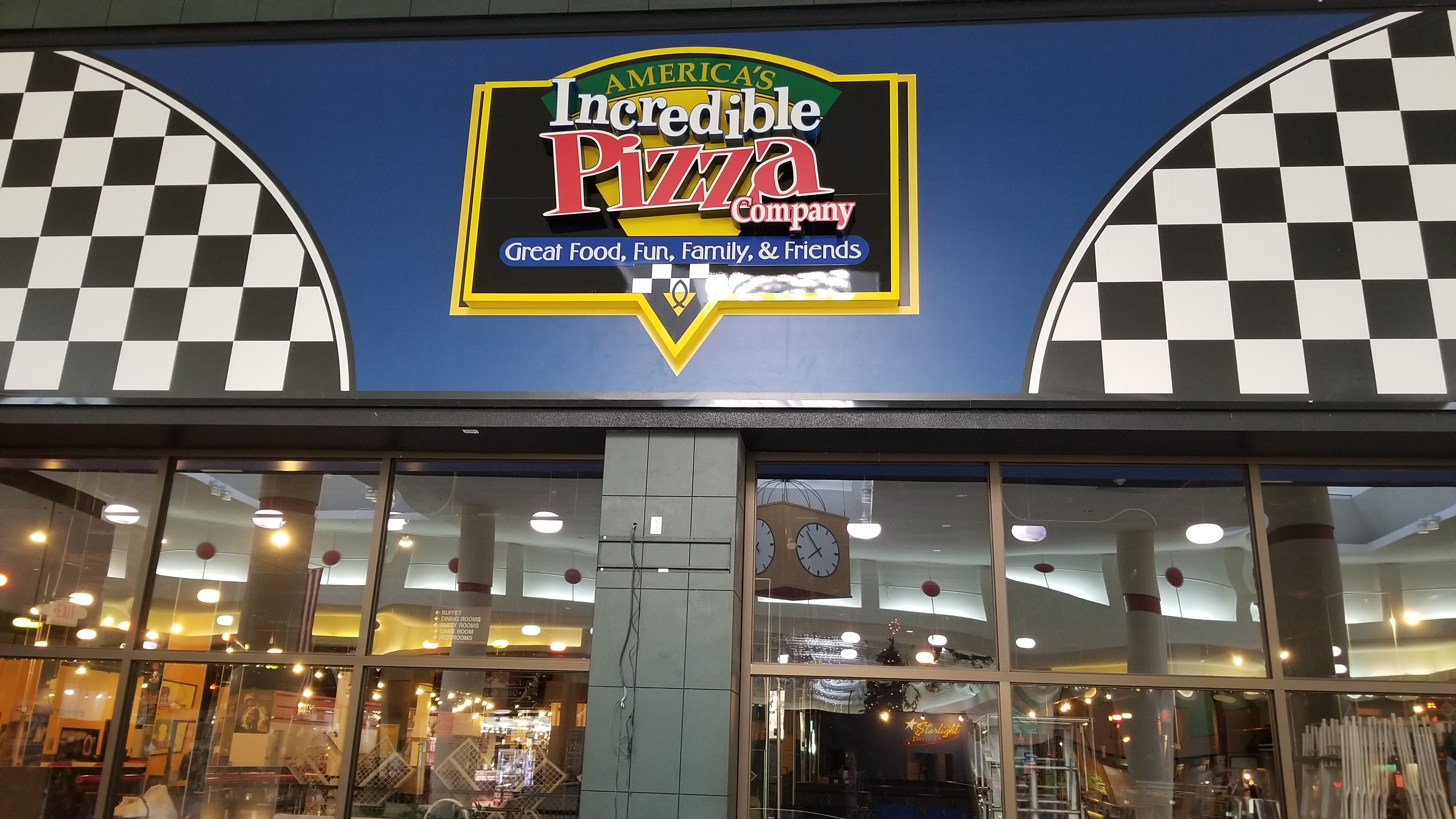
- A now closed AIPC at Lafayette Square Mall in Indianapolis, Indiana, in 2018.
- Trade name: Incredible Pizza Company (United States); America's Incredible Pizza Company (Mexico)
- Type: Private
- Industry: Restaurants
- Founded: 2002; 24 years ago
- Founders: Rick Barsness; Cheryl Barsness
- Headquarters: Springfield, Missouri, U.S.
- Number of locations: 5 (2025)
- Area served: United States, Mexico
- Key people: Rick Barsness Founder & CEO, Cheryl Barsness Founder
- Products: Pizza
- Revenue: $64.1 million
- Number of employees: 1,200
- Website: www.incrediblepizza.com

America's Incredible Pizza Company (AIPC) is an American restaurant chain based in Springfield, Missouri. The restaurants are pizza buffets and entertainment centers. The first restaurant opened in Springfield in 2002. The company has 1,200 employees, and a revenue of $64.1 million.

== History ==
The first America's Incredible Pizza Company restaurant was founded in Springfield, Missouri by Rick and Cheryl Barsness in 2002. In 1975, the Barsnesses owned 11 franchises of Mr. Gatti's Pizza. In 2002, the couple sold the franchises to fund their own company, which was called Springfield's Incredible Pizza Company.

AIPC grew out of an idea from its founder, Rick Barsness. When Barsness was a hockey player in high school, his team reached the state championships, but his father never attended a game. His father's absence nurtured a boyhood dream of a place where families could eat and have fun together. This was the type of place Barsness wished he could have spent time with his father.

In 2003, years of legal battles came to an end when Rick Barsness agreed to pay Gatti's a $1 million settlement. Mr. Gatti's had charged that Barsness had violated his franchise contract with them, and had taken trade secrets. In addition to the $1 million payout, Barsness also agreed to pay Mr. Gatti's Inc. 1% of IPC's net sales for the next 10 years.

AIPC started franchising and established its corporate headquarters in Tulsa, Oklahoma in 2003. It moved the headquarters to Springfield, Missouri in 2009.

AIPC restaurants have an average of 250 employees and it costs $5–9 million to start a restaurant.

America's Incredible Pizza announced that its location at Lafayette Square Mall in Indianapolis would close March 19, 2012.

== Locations and format ==
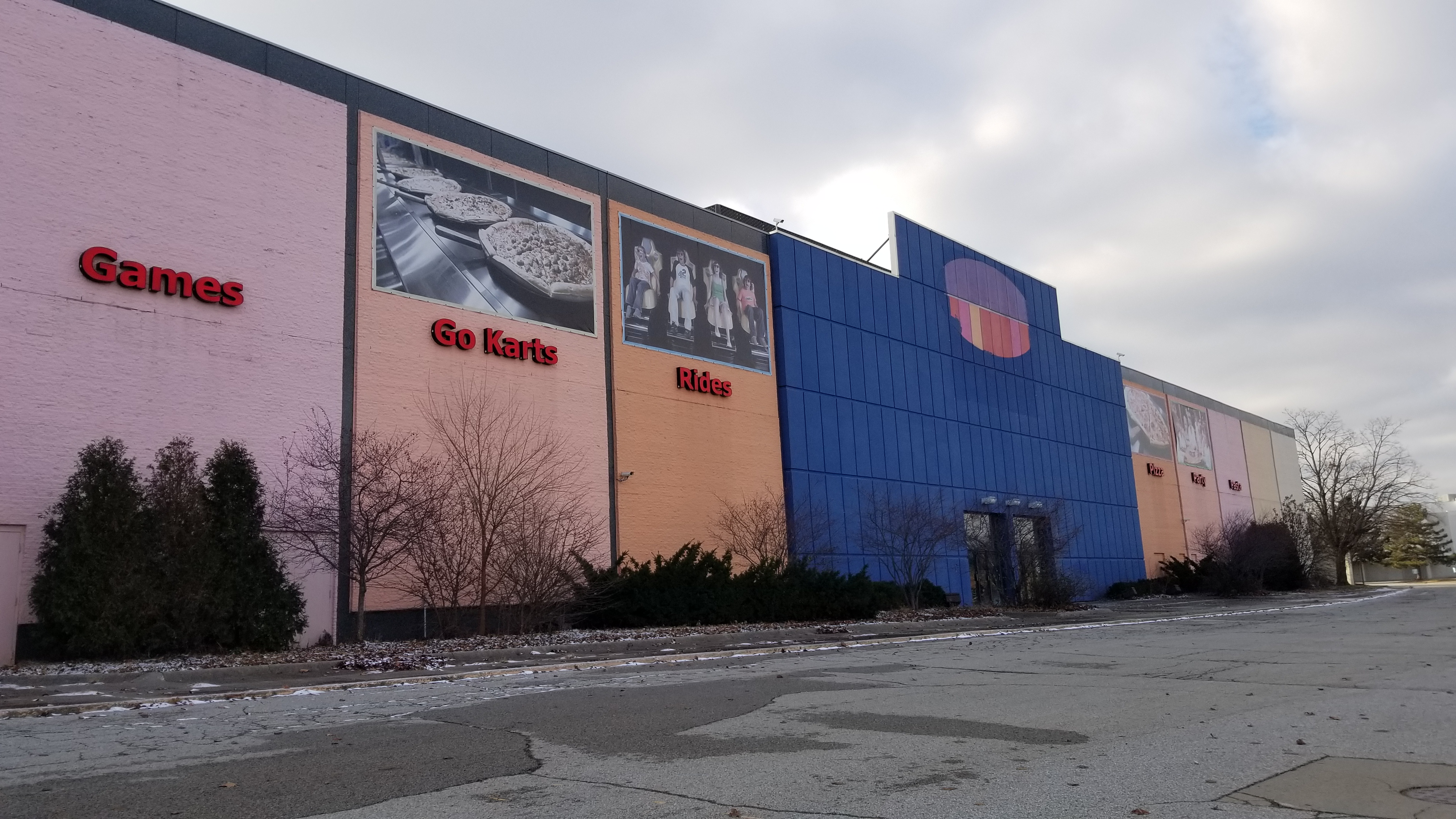
Exterior at a defunct AIPC at Lafayette Square Mall in Indianapolis, Indiana, in 2018.

At the AIPC, the music and decorations have a 1950s theme. AIPC has a buffet style pizza, pasta, salad, and dessert bar, with several seating areas for customers to eat. These include the Starlite Drive In, Family Room, Diner, and Gym. The restaurant has 30 types of pizza and an 80-item salad bar. An AIPC restaurant has an average area of 65,000 to 70,000 square feet (6,000 to 6,500 m^{2}). The restaurant is smoke-free and alcohol-free. It has an arcade, go-karts, billiards, bowling, and miniature golf, among other activities.

== Incredible Pizza Company Foundation ==
In fall 2007, the Incredible Pizza Company founders, Rick and Cheryl Barsness, founded the Incredible Pizza Company Foundation (IPC Foundation) for the goal of donating to missionaries and orphanages. On February 20, 2008, the IPC Foundation gave $24,000 to the Convoy of Hope, a non-profit organization. In September 2008, the IPCF donated $6,500 to Care to Learn, a fund managed by the Foundation for Springfield Public Schools.

== NASCAR sponsorship ==
America's Incredible Pizza Company was the primary sponsor of number 11 CJM Racing in the NASCAR Nationwide Series in 2008 and 2009. On June 17, 2008, Jason Keller, the driver of the Incredible Pizza-sponsored car, attended the opening of the 15th Incredible Pizza restaurant in Mesquite, Texas. In 2008, first complete NASCAR season that the AIPC sponsored a racing team, the team finished in 17th place. In July 2008, CJM Racing and AIPC partnered with Joe Gibbs Racing. The partnership between the two racing teams included the NASCAR driver Scott Lagasse Jr., who finished 13th in the No. 11 America's Incredible Pizza Company Chevrolet at Charlotte Motor Speedway in October 2008. The sponsorship ended in December 2009 when CJM Racing suspended operations. Keller provided the best run for the team, a third at Gateway Motorsports Park in 2008.

== Awards ==
In 2008, the America's Pizza Company was named a "Top Family Entertainment Center of the World" (TFEC) from the International Association of Amusement Parks and Attractions (IAAPA), which places it among the top five entertainment centers in the world. In 2008, AIPC was rated the 456th fastest growing company in the United States by the Inc 500. In the Inc. Top 100 Food & Beverage Companies, AIPC was rated number 12th, with a 693.1% growth.

== See also ==
- List of buffet restaurants
- List of pizza chains of the United States
