= Chuck-A-Rama =

Restaurant chain of the western United States

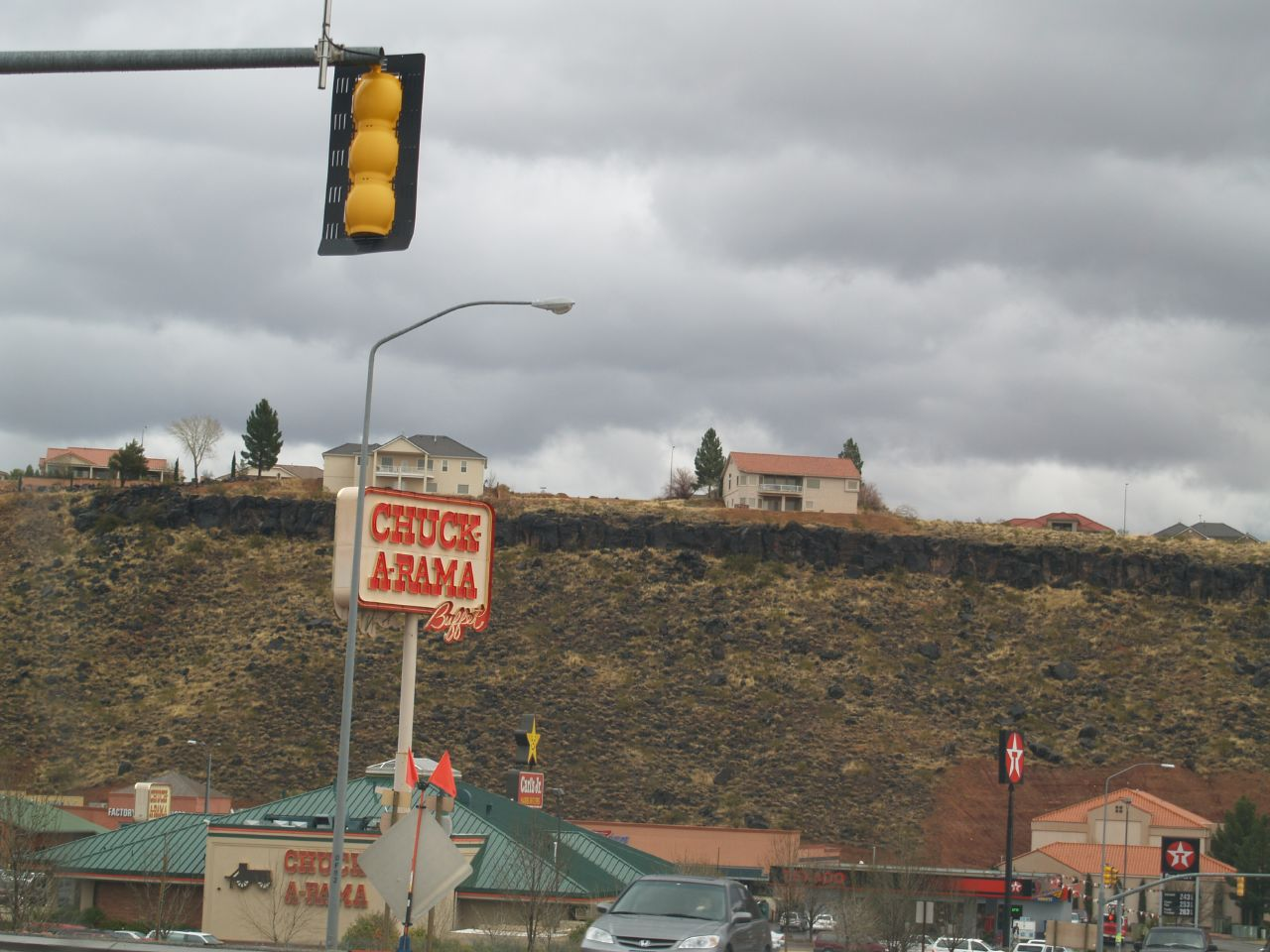
- A Chuck-A-Rama restaurant in St. George, Utah
- Company type: Private
- Industry: Restaurants
- Founded: September 7, 1966; 59 years ago
- Founder: Don Moss
- Headquarters: Salt Lake City, Utah, U.S.
- Number of locations: 11
- Area served: Utah and Idaho
- Key people: Duane Moss (CEO)
- Products: Buffet
- Owner: Moss family
- Website: www.chuck-a-rama.com

Chuck-A-Rama is a chain of buffet restaurants based in Salt Lake City, Utah; as of January 2022, the company operates nine restaurants in Utah and two in Idaho.

== Menu ==
The restaurant's menu includes American comfort food. Main dishes include meats such as baked and fried chicken, carved turkey, ham, and roast beef, and mashed potatoes and gravy, and deep-fried scones. A salad bar is included with every meal and a rotating variety of soups are provided. The chain also serves breakfast food.

== History ==
Don Moss opened the first Chuck-A-Rama restaurant in September 7, 1966, in the former O.P. Skaggs building in Salt Lake City, Utah. The company's name was devised by Don Moss and is a portmanteau of the word "chuckwagon" and the term "Scout-O-Rama".

In 2004, Chuck-A-Rama gained national attention when, at its Taylorsville, Utah location, a couple following the Atkins diet were made to leave without refunds after attempting to go back to the carved roast beef twelve times. The chain stated that, although they are a buffet, they are not an all-you-can-eat restaurant.

== See also ==
- List of buffet restaurants
- List of Utah companies
