= Mr. Gatti's Pizza =

US pizzeria chain

Mr Gatti’s Pizza
- Type: Private
- Industry: Restaurant
- Founded: 1964; 62 years ago in Stephenville, Texas, USA
- Founder: James Eure
- Headquarters: Fort Worth, Texas, USA
- Number of locations: 120 (Open and in development)
- Areas served: Southern United States
- Products: Pizza Delivery, Salad bar, Pizza Buffet, Pizza Pickup, Family Entertainment
- Owner: Sovrano LLC
- Website: mrgattispizza.com

Mr. Gatti's Pizza, formerly known as Gatti's Pizza and commonly shortened as Gatti's, is a Southern and Southeastern United States pizza-buffet chain based out of Fort Worth, Texas.

== History ==
In 1964, retired Air Force Lieutenant Colonel James R. Eure opened a pizza and hamburger restaurant in his hometown of Stephenville, Texas. He and his wife moved to Austin, Texas; and in 1969, he opened a pizza restaurant in Austin under the name, "The Pizza Place." In order to identify themselves from the rest of the pizza places, Eure undertook a naming contest. Eure's wife's maiden name was Gatti, which soon won out over many other proposed names and The Pizza Place was renamed Mr. Gatti's Pizza.

In 1974, Eure sold his chain of 18 Mr. Gatti's restaurants to a group of investors but held on to a few franchises. The investors worked with Eure in helping the company grow by establishing in Texas and many other states. The chain has since changed hands a number of times.

By the 1980s, Mr. Gatti's took on a more modern look by adding a game room and a buffet bar into many of its restaurants.

In the 1990s, Mr. Gatti's had expanded its game room concept (which at that time, the concept was titled "GattiLand") by adding more arcade games and bumper cars into most of its newer restaurants, with an orange-canopy entrance to the game room saying "Welcome to GattiLand - Family Fun & Games". Notable locations using this modified concept are two locations in Louisville, Kentucky, Abilene, Texas,Spartanburg, South Carolina, and Round Rock, Texas.

In 1997, Mr. Gatti's created a new concept called "GattiTown". The first store to use this concept opened in the Oak Hill area of Austin that year. The restaurant's design was patterned after Main Street, U.S.A., and was complete with a buffet, several dining and party rooms, and a Midway game room, which featured many arcade games plus a large carousel.

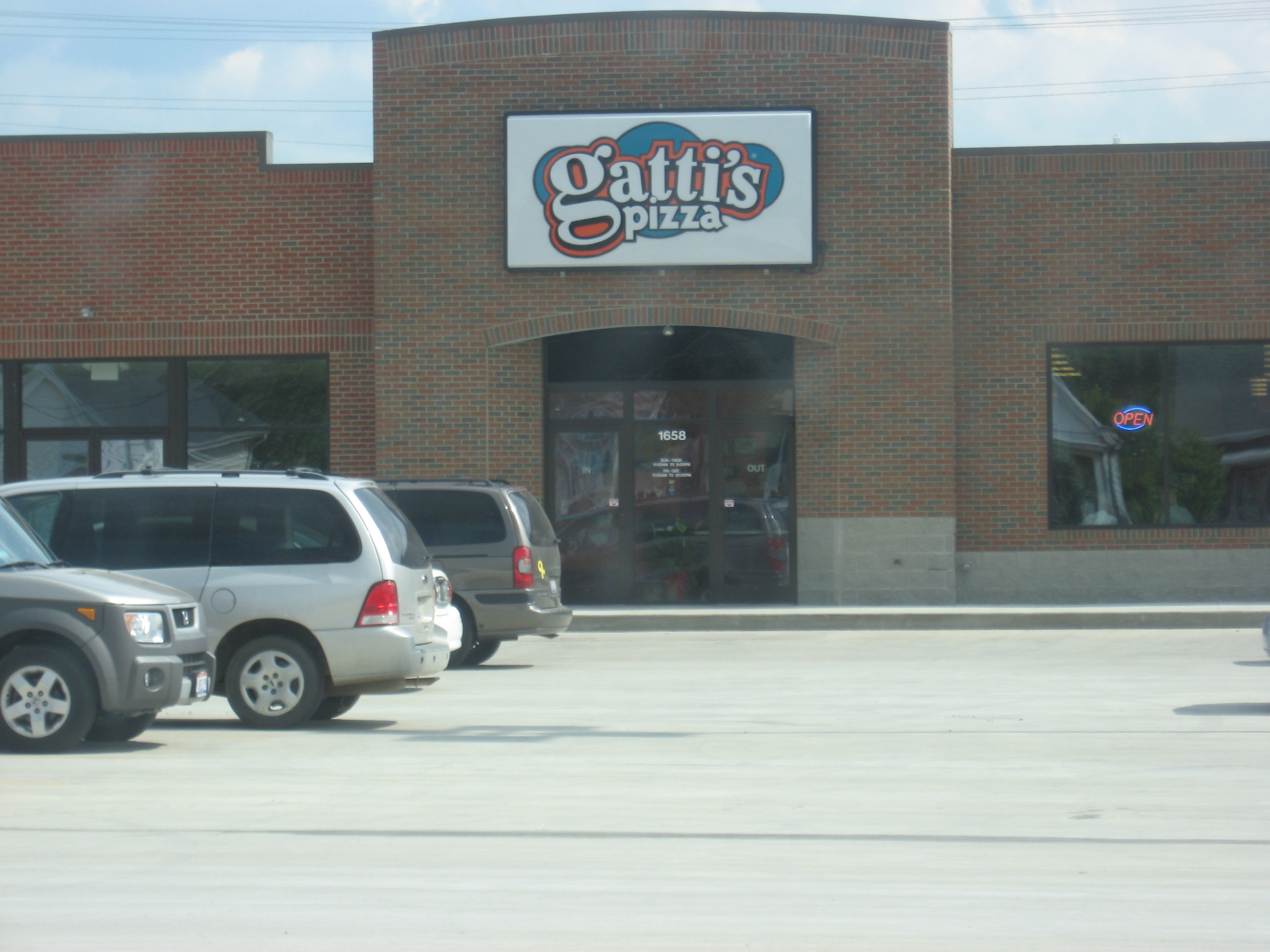
Gatti's Pizza located in Portsmouth, Ohio.

=== Turn of millennium ===
Some Gatti's Pizza locations are branded under the GattiTown name; these are based on the Family Entertainment Concept (FEC) with a larger physical footprint and a dedicated gaming and attraction based midway.

In 2004, Blue Sage Capital bought the chain. Three years later in 2007, Blue Sage renamed Mr. Gatti's as Gatti's Pizza to reflect current trends.

In June 2015, Blue Sage sold Gatti's Pizza to Sovrano, LLC for an undisclosed amount with Michael Poates, president of Sovrano, being appointed president and CEO of Mr Gatti's. In February 2016, Sovrano, LLC renamed Gatti's Pizza back to Mr. Gatti's Pizza due to only 30% of Google searches using the rebranded "Gatti's Pizza's" moniker.

In January 2019, Fort Worth-based Sovrano LLC, the owner of Mr. Gatti's Pizza, filed for Chapter 11 bankruptcy protection in U.S. Bankruptcy Court for the Northern District of Texas, claiming liabilities of $10 million to $50 million. Approximately 70 locations in eight states remained in business, six months before the COVID-19 pandemic began.

As of 2024, the Mr. Gatti's website lists 75 locations — 44 in Texas, 14 in Kentucky, 8 in Louisiana, 3 in Indiana, 2 each in Alabama and Tennessee, and 1 each in Ohio and Oklahoma.

== See also ==
- List of pizza chains of the United States
- List of buffet restaurants
