= Giovanni's Pizza =

American pizza franchise

- Type: Private
- Industry: Restaurants Franchising
- Genre: Pizzeria; Buffet
- Founded: Wheelersburg, Ohio (1964; 62 years ago)
- Headquarters: Ashland, Kentucky
- Number of locations: Over 100
- Key people: Tom Lemaster (President)
- Products: Pizza, subs, salads, chicken wings, calzones, desserts
- Website: giovannispizza.com

Giovanni's Pizza is a pizza franchise based in Ashland, Kentucky with over 100 stores in six states. Locations are primarily located in the Kyova Tri-State region of Ohio, Kentucky, and West Virginia.

== Overview ==
Giovanni's Pizza was established in 1964 in Wheelersburg, Ohio by Jim and Nancy Lemaster. Jim sold his 1930 Ford Model A to buy their first pizza oven for $300. In 1967, Lemaster sold the restaurant to his brother Gerald and opened a second restaurant in nearby Ashland, Kentucky. That restaurant was sold 3 years later to his brother-in-law. Jim used this franchising strategy to turn the restaurant into a regional chain.

Giovanni's serves pizza, subs, wings, pasta, calzones, and several appetisers called "teasers". Food is available for take-out, delivery, or dine-in, with buffet options at many locations.

== See also ==
- List of pizza chains of the United States
- List of buffet restaurants
