= Les Grands Buffets =

Buffet restaurant in Narbonne, France

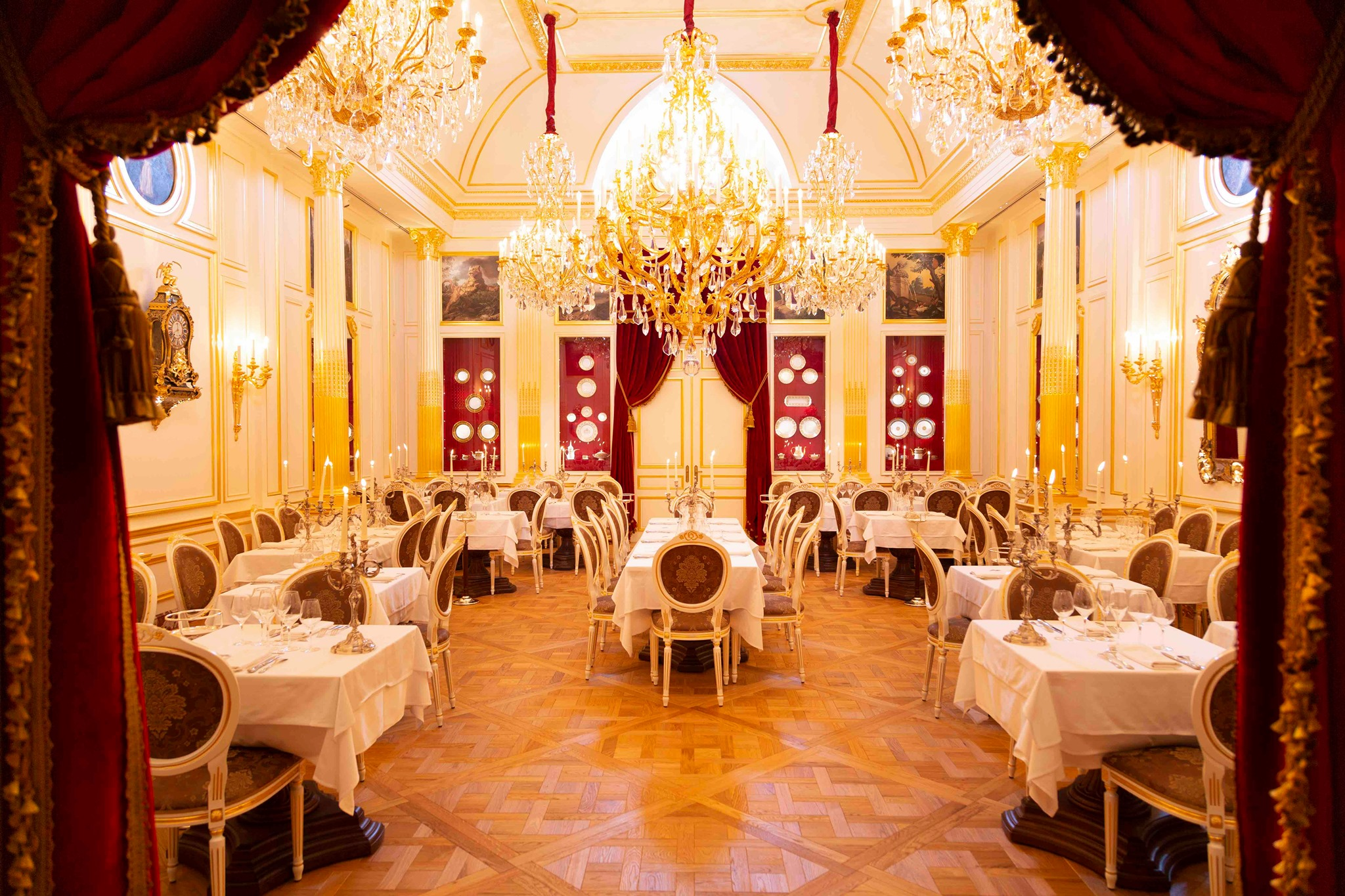
- Salon Jean de la Fontaine, one of four dining rooms
- Interactive map of Les Grands Buffets

Restaurant information
- Established: 1989
- Owner: Louis Privat
- Head chef: Philippe Munos
- Pastry chef: Nicolas Grosse
- Food type: French buffet
- Dress code: Smart casual
- Location: Rond Point de la Liberté, 11100 Narbonne, France, Narbonne, 11100, France
- Coordinates: 43.1743825°N 2.9942220°E
- Seating capacity: 500
- Reservations: Required
- Website: lesgrandsbuffets.com/

Les Grands Buffets is a buffet restaurant located in Narbonne, France. It is the world's largest all-you-can restaurant, serving around 400,000 diners a year. It is also France's highest grossing restaurant. It focuses on classical French cuisine inspired by the 19th-century chef Auguste Escoffier, with around 150 dishes drawn from or inspired by the 1907 edition of his book, Le guide culinaire.

== History ==
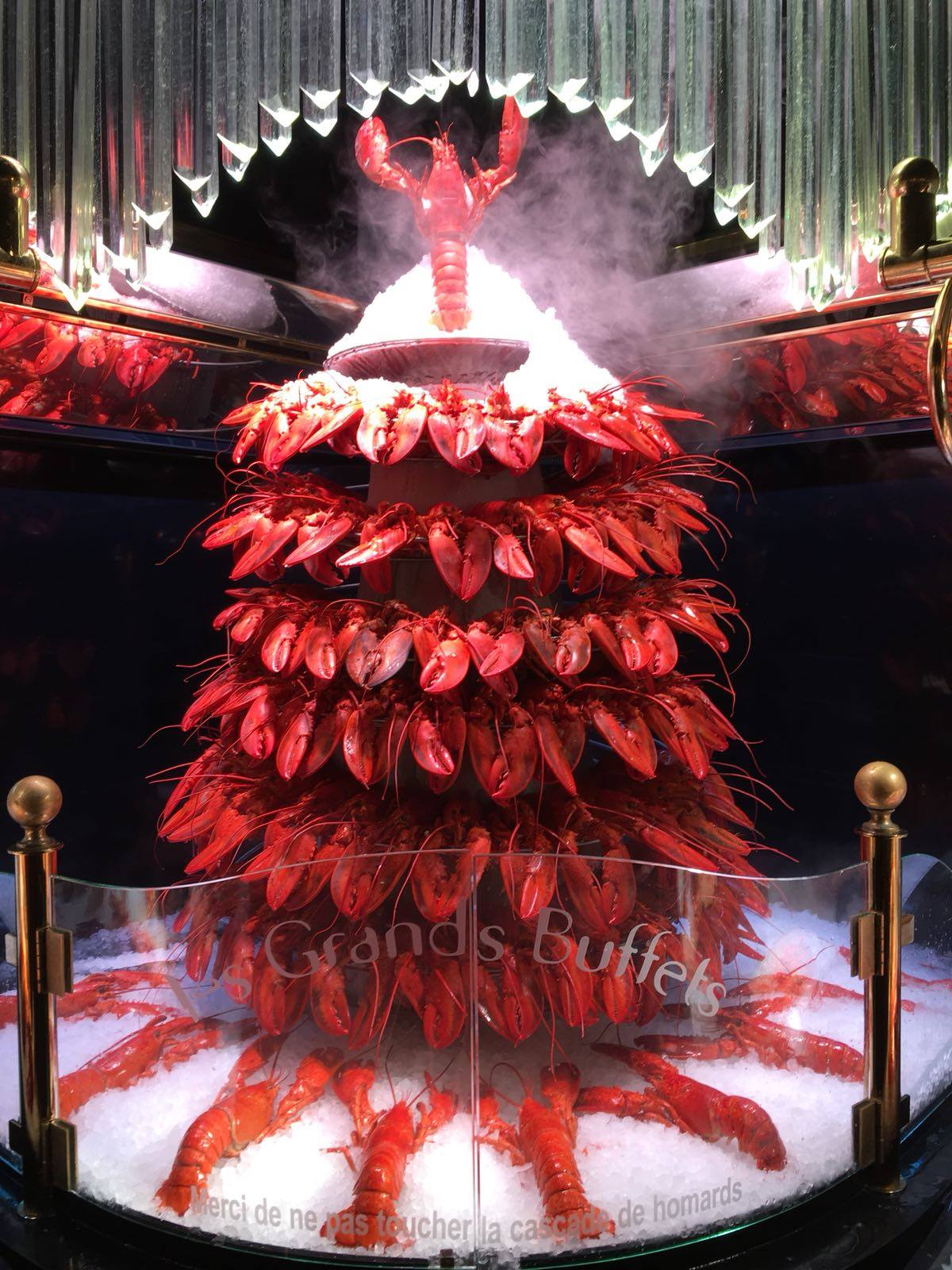
Lobster tower

The restaurant was founded by Louis and Jane Privat in 1989. It was originally an all-you-can-eat cafeteria that catered to a new recreation centre at de l'Espace liberté in Norbonne. It served a variety of cuisines but evolved to become a buffet restaurant that serves classic French cuisine.

In 2008 the cafeteria was renamed Les Grands Buffets. The restaurant was not initially conceived as a tribute to Auguste Escoffier, instead Louis Privat was interested in presenting traditional cuisine. He said: "I asked our chefs to focus on classic dishes: tripe, daube [a Provençal stew], snails. One day, I realised that all the recipes we were working with were recorded in Escoffier's Le Guide Culinaire."

Over the year, he introduced various features to the restaurant, including a seven-tier lobster tower. In 2019, it opened the tented dining room that can accommodate 160 diners to celebrate its 30th anniversary. In 2020, the restaurant used its closure during the pandemic to refurbish its rooms and added the ritual of canard au sang for its signature dish pressed duck when it reopened.

By 2025, the number of patrons at the restaurant had reached around 400,000 a year, the great majority (86%) of them French. It earned €30m (£26m/$34.8m) in revenue in 2025, which is the highest in France for a restaurant.

A major upgrade of the restaurant was initiated in May 2026, and scheduled to be completed in 2028.

== Food ==
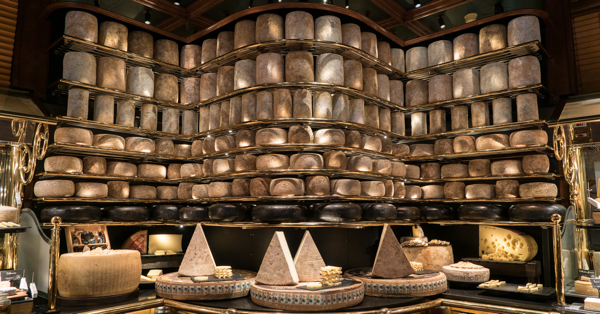
The buffet offers the world's largest selection of cheeses

Unlike most buffets, Les Grands Buffets focuses on French cuisine rather than dishes from around the world. The 150 dishes include a selection of foie gras in pâté en croûte and terrine form, such as Oreiller de la Belle Aurore ("Aurora's Pillow"), a pâté prepared from over 10 different meats. There is also a wide selection of charcuterie, along with a seafood buffet featuring a seven-tiered lobster tower.

Along with pre-prepared items, over 30 larger dishes are made to order, such as "le canard au sang", or in other words, pressed duck, prepared in the same way as La Tour d'Argent. Other dishes include a traditional form of cassoulet from Castelnaudary, as well as many other classical French dishes such as Tournedos Rossini, a mix of filet mignon and foie gras with a Madeira wine sauce, and more traditional French bistro dishes.

Dessert selections include cakes such as St. Honore, their "Palais de Glaces," or ice cream parlor, Île Flottante, or floating island, and prepared desserts such as Crêpe Suzette. The restaurant also holds a Guinness World Record for the most available cheeses, with over 110.

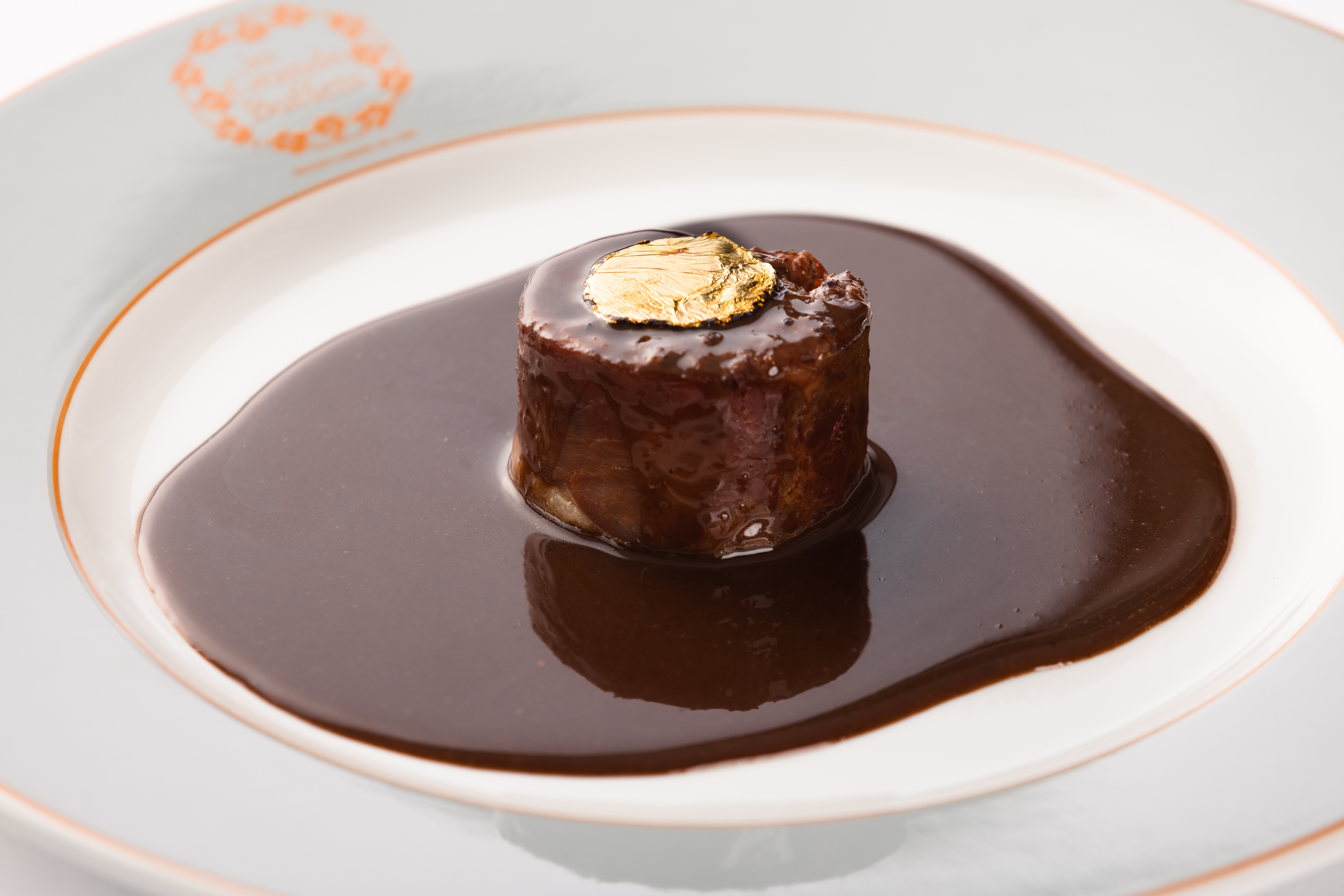
Plate of hare à la royale, or hare with sauce made from wine and hare offal

== Wine ==
In 2020, the wine list, which specializes in wine from Languedoc-Roussillon, was awarded a Special Jury Prize from Terre de Vins magazine for the best selection by the glass. The menu also includes aperitifs and digestifs, as well as dishes containing liquor, such as trou normand, a mix of Calvados and apple as a palate cleanser. Wine and beverages are not included in the cost of the buffet meal, but are offered at the same price as in the winery.

== Facility ==
The buffet has four large dining rooms that can seat 500 people in each of its four seatings (two for lunch and two for dinner). The rooms are designed in a different style: the Salon Doré Jean de la Fontaine was designed by those who were involved in the restoration of the Palace of Versailles; Tente d’Apparat Jean-Baptiste Nolin features a Louis XIV-inspired tent, Salle à Manger Ann Carrington, a wood-panelled room that showcase modern art; and Salle Max Le Verrier, which is decorated in an Art Deco style. There is also a Garden Terrace for outdoor dining, and two private rooms for smaller groups.

There are broadly three sections to the restaurant: the first section contains the starters, a lobster tower and a foie gras station; the middle section is dedicated to the main courses with a rotisserie and a counter where cooked meals may be ordered; and the last section offers a variety of desserts including a chocolate fountain. Also included in the buffet are the world's largest cheese board, and a pressed duck ceremony presented every 45 minutes. Most of the dishes available at the restaurant are self-service, although staff are available to assist the diners, especially on speciality dishes.

Reservations are made solely on their website and are notoriously difficult to obtain, often taking several months. Guests typically spend between 2 and 4 hours at the buffet. The restaurant, as of 2025, costs 65.90 euros per person, not including wine or other drinks.
