= HuHot Mongolian Grill =

American Mongolian barbecue restaurant chain

- Formerly: Mongo's
- Type: Private
- Founded: 1999; 27 years ago
- Founder: Linda Vap
- Headquarters: Missoula, Montana, United States
- Number of locations: 70+
- Key people: Linda Vap
- Website: www.huhot.com

HuHot Mongolian Grill is an American restaurant chain specializing in a create-your-own stir fry cuisine (Mongolian barbecue) with its headquarters in Missoula, Montana. As of March 2017, there are over 70 HuHot Mongolian Grills in 18 states, with the vast majority located in the Midwest and Mountain West states.

== Name ==
The first HuHot, then called Mongo's, was built in Missoula, Montana in 1999 by the Vap family. However, when the company decided to franchise, they found that name was already trademarked. They chose the name HuHot, from Hohhot, the capital of Inner Mongolia.

== History ==
Due to the Vap's family's experience as Godfather's Pizza franchisees, they were familiar with franchising and knew a fellow restaurateur based in the Midwest who was interested in the concept. From there, it grew by word-of-mouth. Linda Vap, the president and founder of the company, was a career scientist before starting the business.

The first franchised HuHot was built in Omaha, Nebraska in 2002. As of 2022, there are nearly 60 locations of the restaurant across 17 states.

== Murals ==
The walls of each HuHot Mongolian Grill location are covered in hand-painted murals appropriating Mongolian folk tales. Laura Blaker, a Missoula, Montana-based artist, travels to each new HuHot to paint its unique murals.

== See also ==
- Hohhot, Inner Mongolian Autonomous Region, China
