= The Nordic =

Restaurant in Rhode Island

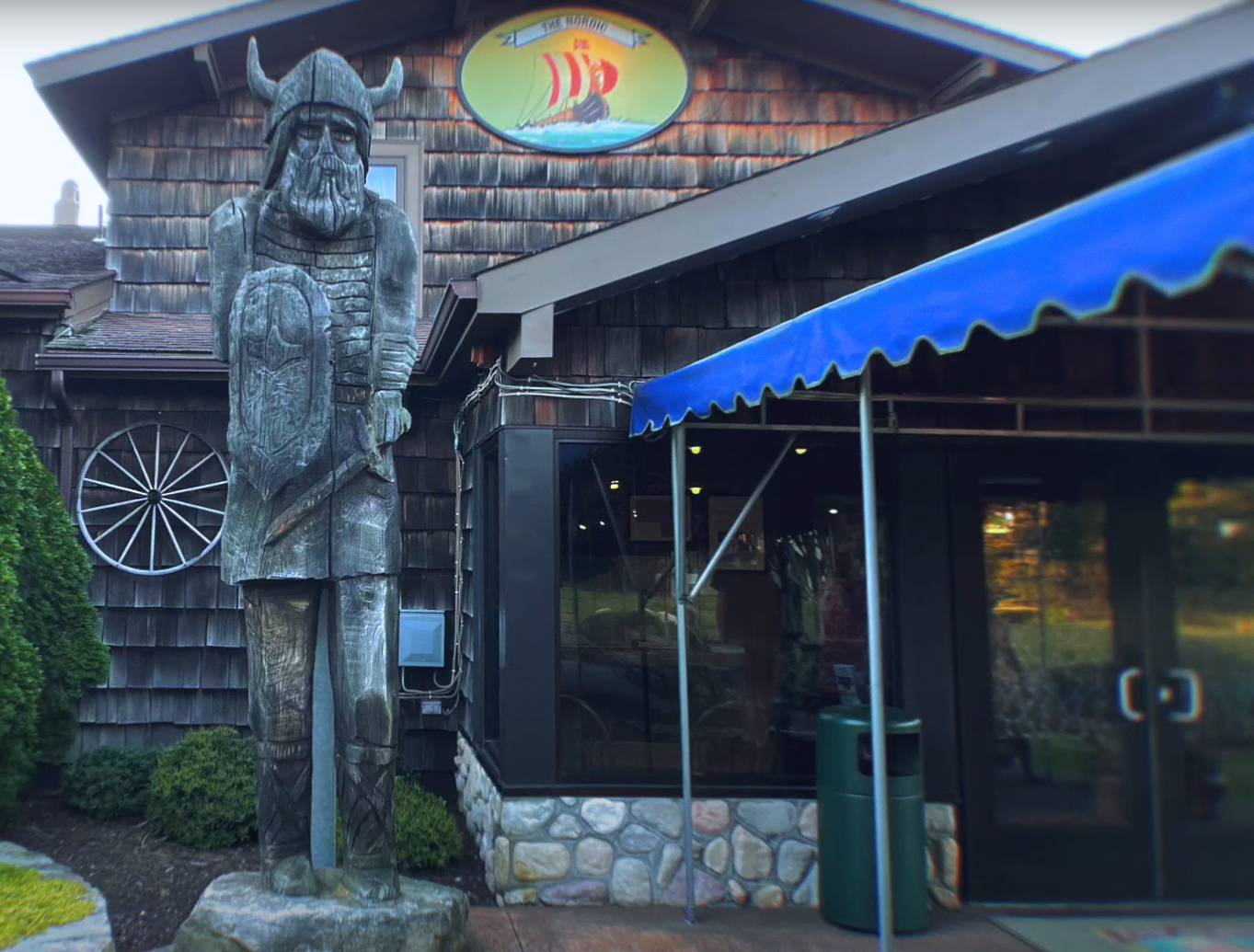
- The exterior of the restaurant in 2021

- Location within Rhode Island The Nordic (the United States)

Restaurant information
- Established: 1963
- Owner(s): Steven Persson; Nancy Log; Lisa Brown
- Food type: Seafood
- Location: 178 Nordic Trl, Charlestown, RI 02813
- Coordinates: 41.4262°N 71.6286°W
- Website: thenordic.com

The Nordic, formerly known as the Nordic Lodge, is an all-you-can-eat seafood restaurant in Charlestown, Rhode Island. Located on the lakeside of Pasquiet Pond, it has been continuously owned and operated by the Persson family since its founding in 1963.

== History ==
The restaurant has been in operation since 1963. Karl O. Persson, a Swedish carpenter, and his wife Irma, from Denmark, moved to Brooklyn, New York in the late 1920s due to the Great Depression in Sweden. They had a son, Richard (Dick), who, when he was ten, moved back to Sweden with his parents for ten years to adapt to Swedish culture. After moving back, Dick married Gudny (Goody), a Norwegian immigrant to the U.S. In 1963, after having two children, the couple decided to move to a more rural area and purchased a vacation area in Charlestown. They were able to continue making a living by serving three meals a day from their lodge, but, due to the remoteness of the area, it was only accessible by visitors in the warmer months. However, it later was able to be open year-round, and it wasn't until 1970 when the restaurant obtained a license to sell liquor.

The restaurant became a buffet in 1980 The restaurant closed in March 2020 due to the COVID-19 pandemic, but reopened in June with servers at the buffet area. after a local all-you-can-eat restaurant in North Kingstown, Custy's, burned down and the Perssons decided to take advantage of the vacancy. The restaurant changed its name and rebranded from the Nordic Lodge to The Nordic in February 2023.

== Menu ==
The buffet serves lobster, scallop, snow crab, shrimp, hard clams, scampi, prawn cocktail, clam chowder, bisque, lobster macaroni and cheese, lobster fritters, oysters, clams, sole, salmon, prime rib, filet mignon, chicken wings, pork ribs, beef tenderloin, chicken tenders, and candied bacon. Appetizers and desserts, such as cannoli, Bismarcks, and lemon bars, are also served.

Over 6,000 pounds (2,700 kg) of lobster, the fan favorite, and 3,000 pounds (1,400 kg) of shrimp are served each weekend. As of 2012, much of it was locally sourced from Point Judith, Rhode Island.

The cost per person for dinner in 2012 was $85 (drink and tax included).
