= Salad bar =

Buffet of salad components for people to assemble their own salads

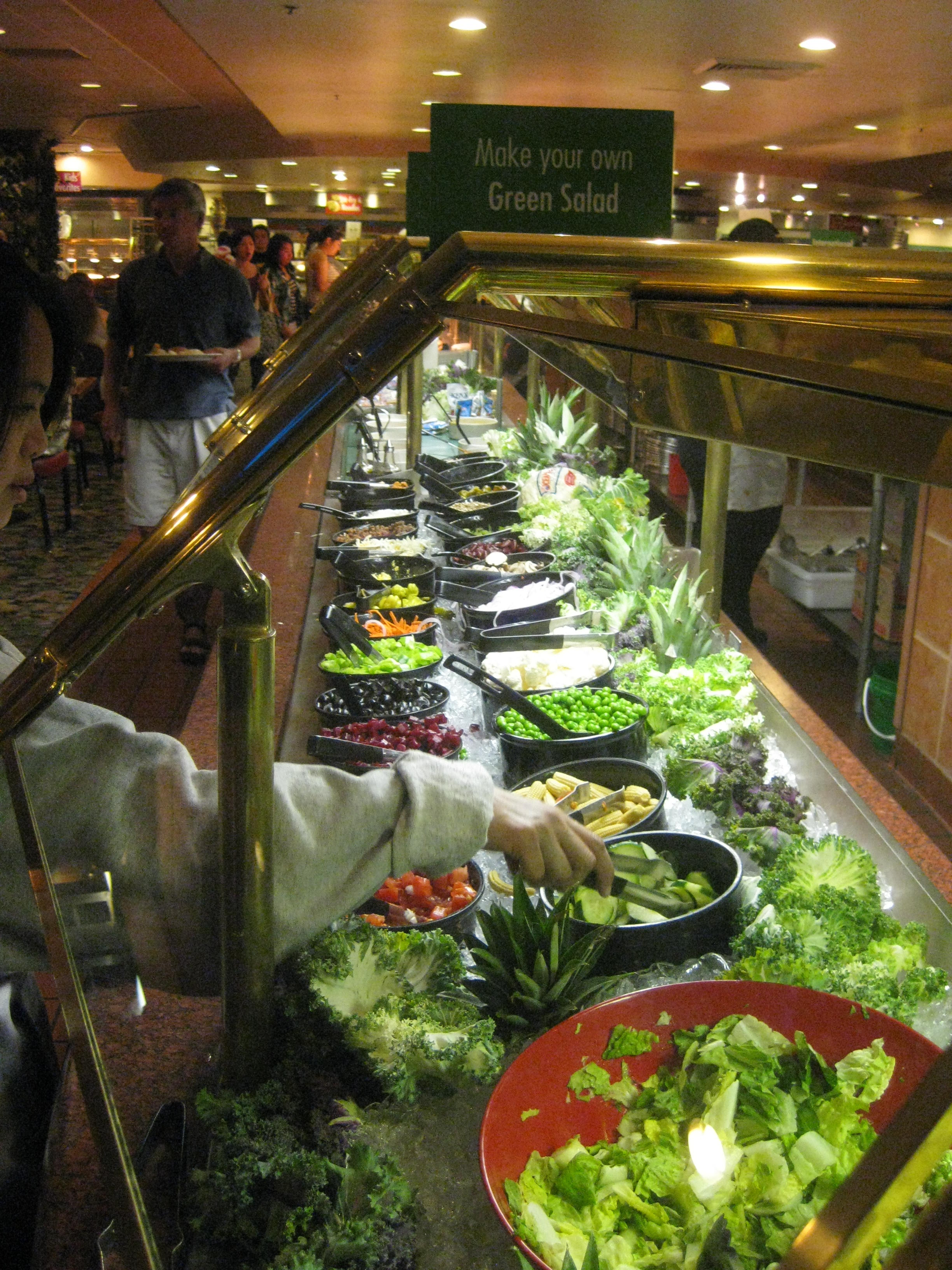
A salad bar at an American casino's restaurant

A salad bar is a buffet-style table or bar where customers can create their own salad plates from individual salad ingredients or completed dishes. Salad bars are commonly found in restaurants, food markets, and cafeterias. Salad bars are a popular dining option in many countries around the world, but they are applied in different ways depending on the local culture and cuisine.

== History ==
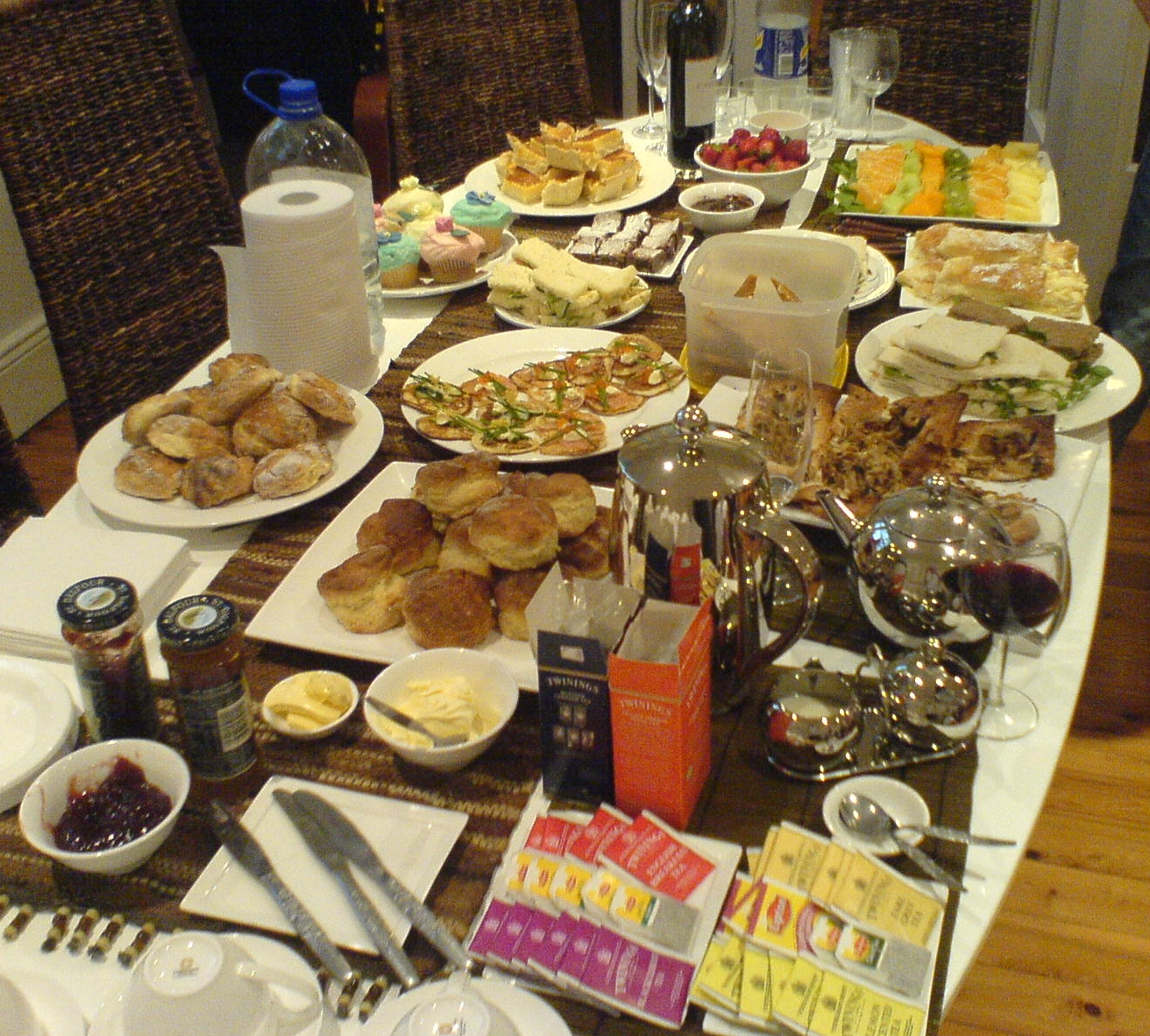
Swedish smörgåsbord buffet

The origins of the salad bar are unclear, but it is thought that the idea may have been sparked by the Swedish smörgåsbord that was featured at the 1938 World's Fair in New York. By the early 1940s, many U.S. newspapers' homemaking columnists had suggested the idea for family or guests ("why not serve the ingredients separately and allow each member to assemble their own?") and by 1956, at least one U.S. restaurant was advertising the concept ("Have fun at our salad board. You select and make your own salad from large choice of ingredients. Chris' Corral [Oakdale, CA]." Norman Brinker, of casual-dining businesses like Chili's and Bennigan's, featured salad bars at his Steak and Ale restaurants in the late 1960s to keep guests pleased and active while they waited for their entrées.

== See also ==
- Buffet
- List of buffet restaurants
- List of cafeterias
