= Buffet =

Meal system where diners serve themselves

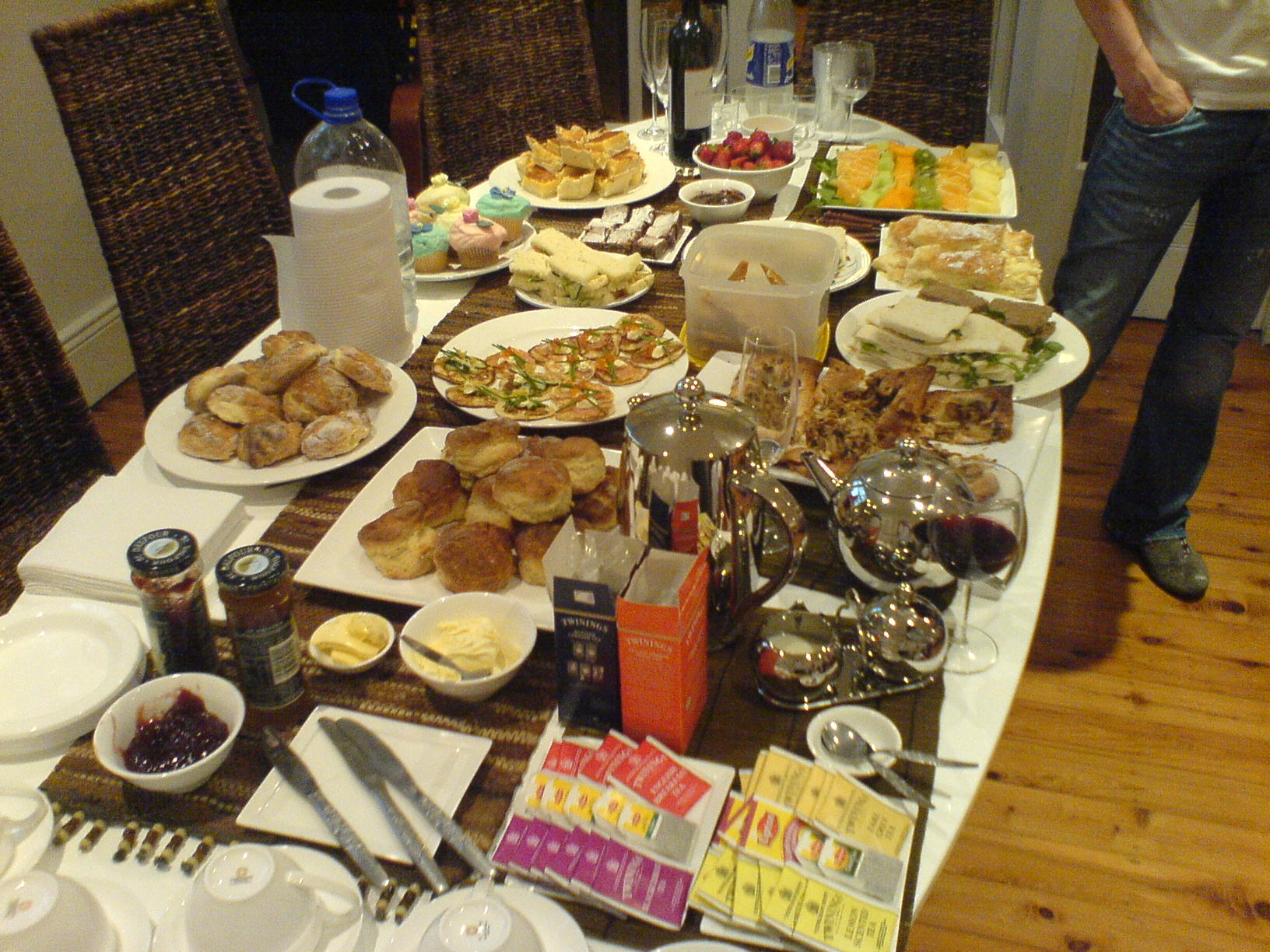
Swedish smörgåsbord buffet

A buffet is a system of serving meals in which food is placed in a public area where the diners serve themselves. A form of service à la française, buffets are offered at various places including hotels, restaurants, and many social events. Buffet restaurants normally offer all-you-can-eat food for a set price, but some measure prices by weight or by number of dishes. Buffets usually have some or mostly hot dishes, so the term cold buffet (see Smörgåsbord) has been developed to describe formats lacking hot food. Hot or cold buffets usually involve dishware and utensils, but a finger buffet is an array of foods that are designed to be small and easily consumed only by hand, such as cupcakes, slices of pizza, and foods on cocktail sticks.

The essential feature of the various buffet formats is that the diners can directly view the food and immediately select which dishes they wish to consume, and usually also can decide how much food they take. Buffets are effective for serving large numbers of people at once, and are often seen in institutional settings, business conventions, or large parties.

== Home entertaining ==
As a buffet involves diners serving themselves, it has in the past been considered an informal form of dining, less formal than table service. In recent years, however, buffet meals are increasingly popular among hosts of home dinner parties, especially in homes where limited space complicates the serving of individual table places.

=== Origins ===
In the 19th century, supper, a lighter meal some hours after the main dinner, was sometimes served as a buffet (and so called), especially late at night at grand balls, where not everyone present eats at the same time, or in the same quantity. Even in a very large building, at a large ball there might not be enough space to seat all guests at the same time, or servants to serve them in the manner required by the prevailing customs. A large cooked English breakfast with various choices was also very often routinely served this way, for similar reasons. Even when many servants were on hand, there might be an element of self-service. The term buffet originally referred to the French sideboard furniture where the food was placed, but eventually became applied to the serving format.

At balls, the "buffet" was also where drinks were obtained, either by circulating footmen supplying orders from guests, but often by the male guests. During the Victorian period, it became usual for guests to have to eat standing up. In fact John Conrade Cooke's cookbook Cookery and Confectionery, (London: 1824) says it was already "the present fashion". In a report on a ball in 1904, a departure from "the usual stand-up buffet supper", with parties being able to reserve tables, was praised.

Scandinavians like to claim that the buffet table originates from the brännvinsbord (Swedish schnapps, or shot of alcoholic beverage) table from the middle of 16th century. This custom had its prime during the early 18th century. The smörgåsbord buffet did not increase in popularity until the expansion of the railroads throughout Europe.

The smörgåsbord table was originally a meal where guests gathered before dinner for a pre-dinner drink, and was not part of the formal dinner that followed. The smörgåsbord buffet was often held in separate rooms for men and women before the dinner was served.

Smörgåsbord became internationally known as "smorgasbord" at the 1939 New York World's Fair exhibition, as the Swedes had to invent a new way of showcasing the best of Swedish food to large numbers of visitors.

=== As displays of wealth ===
While the possession of gold and silver has been a measure of solvency of a regime, the display of it, in the form of plates and vessels, is more a political act and a gesture of conspicuous consumption. The 16th-century French term buffet applied both to the display itself and to the furniture on which it was mounted, often draped with rich textiles, but more often as the century advanced the word described an elaborately carved cupboard surmounted by tiers of shelves. In England, such a buffet was called a court cupboard. Prodigal displays of plate were probably first revived at the fashionable court of Burgundy and adopted in France. The Baroque displays of silver and gold that were affected by Louis XIV of France were immortalized in paintings by Alexandre-François Desportes and others, before Louis' plate and his silver furniture had to be sent to the mint to pay for the wars at the end of his reign.

During the 18th century, more subtle demonstrations of wealth were preferred. The buffet was revived in England and France at the end of the century, when new ideals of privacy made a modicum of self-service at breakfast-time appealing, even among those who could have had a footman servant behind each chair. In The Cabinet Dictionary of 1803, Thomas Sheraton presented a neoclassical design and observed, that "a buffet may, with some propriety, be restored to modern use, and prove ornamental to a modern breakfast-room, answering as the china cabinet/repository of a tea equipage."

=== 20th century ===
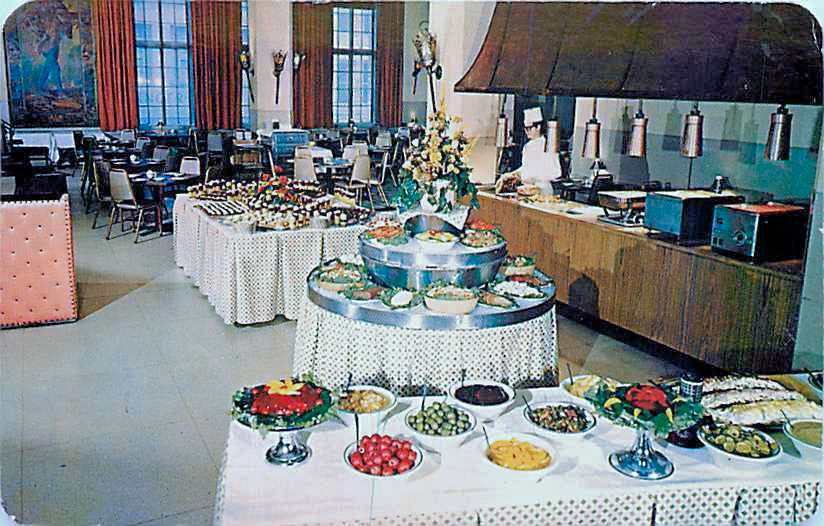
Dinner buffet in Americus Hotel (1955)

In a 1922 housekeeping book entitled How to Prepare and Serve a Meal, Lillian B. Lansdown wrote:

The concept of eating a buffet arose in mid 17th century France, when gentleman callers would arrive at the homes of ladies they wanted to woo unexpectedly. Their surprise arrival would throw the kitchen staff into a panic and the only food that could be served was a selection of what was found in the cold room.

The informal luncheon or lunch—originally the light meal eaten between breakfast and dinner, but now often taking the place of dinner, the fashionable hour being one (or half after if cards are to follow)—is of two kinds. The "buffet" luncheon, at which the guests eat standing; and the luncheon served at small tables, at which the guests are seated...

The knife is tabooed at the "buffet" lunch, hence all the food must be such as can be eaten with fork or spoon. As a rule, friends of the hostess serve... The following dishes cover the essentials of a "buffet" luncheon. Beverages: punch, coffee, chocolate (poured from urn, or filled cups brought from pantry on tray); hot entrées of various sorts (served from chafing dish or platter) preceded by hot bouillon; cold entrées, salads, lobster, potatoes, chicken, shrimp, with heavy dressings; hot rolls, wafer-cut sandwiches (lettuce, tomato, deviled ham, etc.); small cakes, frozen creams and ices.

The informal luncheon at small tables calls for service by a number of maids, hence the "buffet" plan is preferable.

== Variations ==
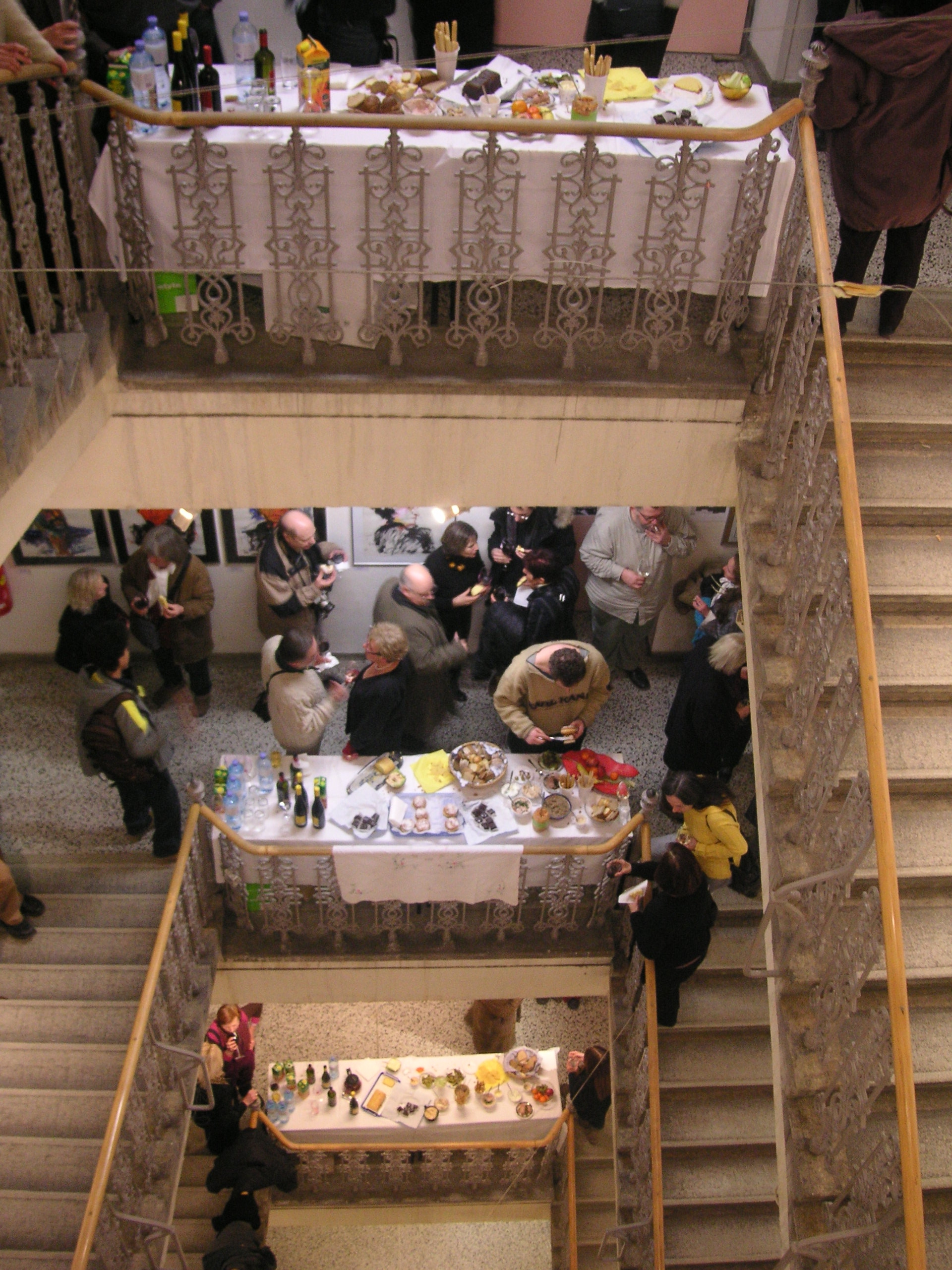
A small cold buffet at an art school exhibition

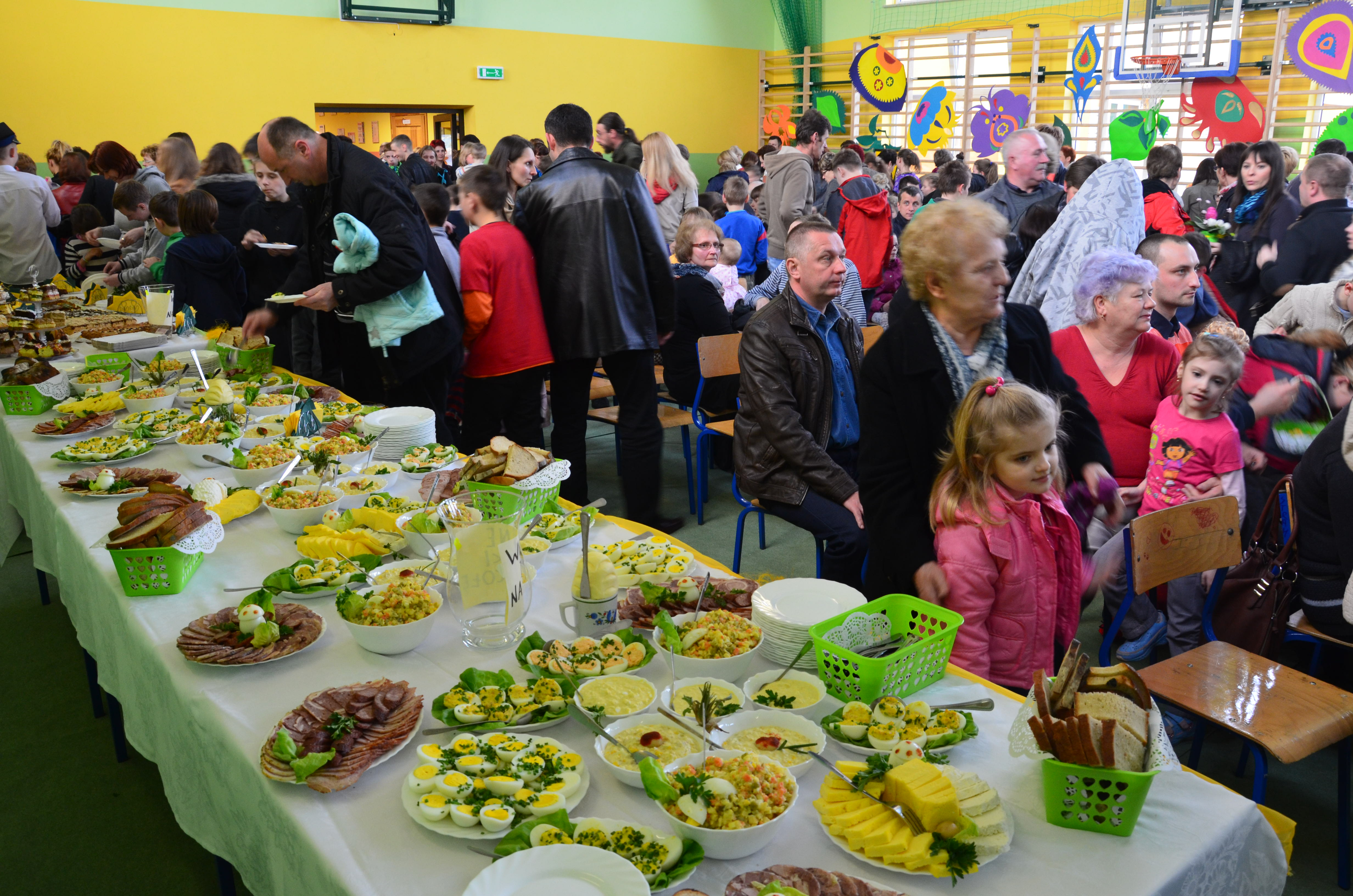
Easter celebration buffet at a school in Poland: Head cheese, boiled eggs, sausage, deviled eggs, rye bread, and stuffed eggs

There are many different ways of offering diners a selection of foods that are called "buffet" style meals. Some buffets are "single pass only", but most buffets allow a diner to first take small samples of unfamiliar foods, and then to return for more servings if desired. To avoid misunderstandings in commercial eating establishments, the rules and charges are often posted on signs near the buffet serving tables.

- One form of buffet is to have a display counter or table filled with plates containing fixed portions of food; customers select plates containing whichever dishes they want as they walk along. The food display may either be staffed, or the customers may pick up the food plates themselves. This form is most commonly seen in cafeterias. Another derivative of this type of buffet occurs where patrons choose food from a buffet style layout and then pay based on what was chosen (sometimes based on the weight of the food, or color-coded plates).
- A variation occurs in a dim sum house, where seated patrons make their selections from wheeled carts containing different plates of food which the staff circulate through the restaurant. Another variation is a conveyor belt sushi restaurant, where seated patrons select dishes from a continuously moving conveyor belt carrying a variety of foods. In another variation, Brazilian rodízio style buffets feature roving waiters serving churrascaria barbecued meats from large skewers directly onto the seated diners' plates. In Brazil, the rodízio style is sometimes also found in Italian (restaurants serving pizza are especially common), and more recently in Japanese restaurants, and also other types of foods.
- The "all-you-can-eat" buffet is more free-form; customers pay a fixed fee and then can help themselves to as much food as they wish to eat in a single meal. This form is found often in restaurants, especially in hotels. In some countries, this format is popular for "Sunday brunch" buffets. It is a profitable concept because all-you-can-eat restaurants often have a lot of customers.
- A so-called Mongolian barbecue buffet format allows diners to collect various thinly sliced raw foods and to add flavorings, which are then stir-fried on a large griddle by a restaurant cook.
- Some hot pot restaurants offer all-you-can-eat buffets, in which diners directly gather or order plates of thinly sliced raw foods and flavorings, and cook them in boiling pots of soup at their tables.
- A salad bar is commonly offered in delicatessens and supermarkets, in which customers help themselves to lettuce and other salad ingredients, then pay by weight. Sometimes only cold foods are offered, but often warmed or hot foods are available at a "hot foods bar", possibly at a different price by weight.
- Open buffets are often associated with a celebration of some sort, and there may be no explicit charge or the cost may be included in an admission fee to the entire event. Art show openings at galleries and museums are often accompanied by a modest buffet for invited guests.

As a compromise between self-service and full table service, a staffed buffet may be offered: diners carry their own plate or tray along the buffet line and are given a portion by a server at each station, which may be selected or skipped by the diner. This method is prevalent at catered meetings where diners are not paying specifically for their meal.

Alternatively, diners may serve themselves for most prepared selections, but a carvery station for roasted meats is staffed. Some buffet formats also feature staffed stations where crepes, omelettes, noodle soups, barbecued meats, or sushi are custom prepared at the request of individual diners.

== All-you-can-eat (AYCE) ==
The all-you-can-eat restaurant was introduced in Las Vegas by Herbert "Herb" Cobb McDonald in 1946. The buffet was advertised in flyers for only one dollar, and a patron could eat "every possible variety of hot and cold entrees to appease the howling coyote in your innards".

Many boarding schools, colleges, and universities offer optional or mandatory "meal plans", especially in connection with dormitories for students. These are often in an "all-you-can-eat" buffet format, sometimes called "all-you-care-to-eat" to encourage dietary moderation. The format may also be used in other institutional settings, such as military bases, large factories, cruise ships, or medium-security prisons.

In 2007, the first all-you-can-eat seating section in Major League Baseball was introduced at Dodger Stadium. The trend spread to 19 of the 30 major league parks by 2010, and numerous minor league parks by 2012. The basic menu includes traditional ballpark food such as hot dogs, nachos, peanuts, popcorn, and soft drinks. In 2008, all-you-can-eat seats were also inaugurated in numerous NBA and NHL arenas.

Some buffet restaurants aim to reduce food waste by imposing fees on customers who take large amounts of food, but then discard it uneaten.

== Restaurant buffets ==
In Australia, buffet chains such as Sizzler serve a large number of patrons with carvery meats, seafood, salads and desserts. Cruise operators in Sydney, conduct Sydney Harbour sightseeing cruises with continental buffets having multiple seafood options. Buffets are also common in Returned and Services League of Australia (RSL) clubs and some motel restaurants.

In Brazil, comida a quilo or comida por quilo—literally, "food by [the] kilo"—restaurants are common. This is a cafeteria style buffet in which diners are billed by the weight of the food selected, excluding the tare weight of the plate. Brazilian cuisine's rodízio style is all-you-can-eat, having both non-self-service and self-service variations.

In Hong Kong, the cha chaan teng buffet is a relatively new variation on traditional low-cost Chinese snack and coffee shops.

In Japan, a buffet or smorgasbord is known as a viking (バイキング - baikingu). It is said that this originated from the restaurant "Imperial Viking" in the Imperial Hotel, Tokyo, which was the first restaurant in Japan to serve buffet-style meals. Dessert Vikings are very popular in Japan, where one can eat from a buffet full of desserts.

In Sweden, a traditional form of buffet is the smörgåsbord, which literally means "table of sandwiches".

=== United States ===
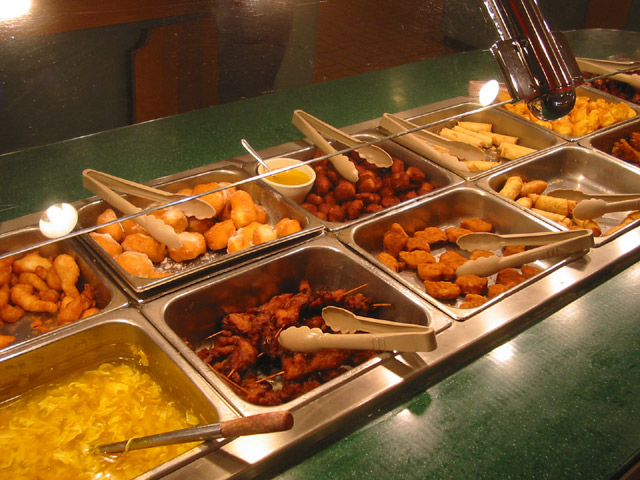
A small Chinese American buffet selection

In the United States, there are numerous Chinese-American cuisine-inspired buffet restaurants, as well as those serving primarily traditional American fare. Also, South Asian cuisine (notably in Indian restaurants), pan-Asian cuisine, and Mediterranean cuisine are increasingly available in the buffet format, and sushi has also become more popular at buffets. In some regions of the US, Brazilian-style churrascaria barbecue buffets served rodízio style are becoming popular.

Las Vegas and Atlantic City are known for all-you-can-eat buffets with a wide range of foods on offer, similar ones have also become common in casinos elsewhere in the United States.

For 2019, buffet food sales in the US were estimated at $5 billion, approximately 1% of the total restaurant business that year.

== Gallery ==
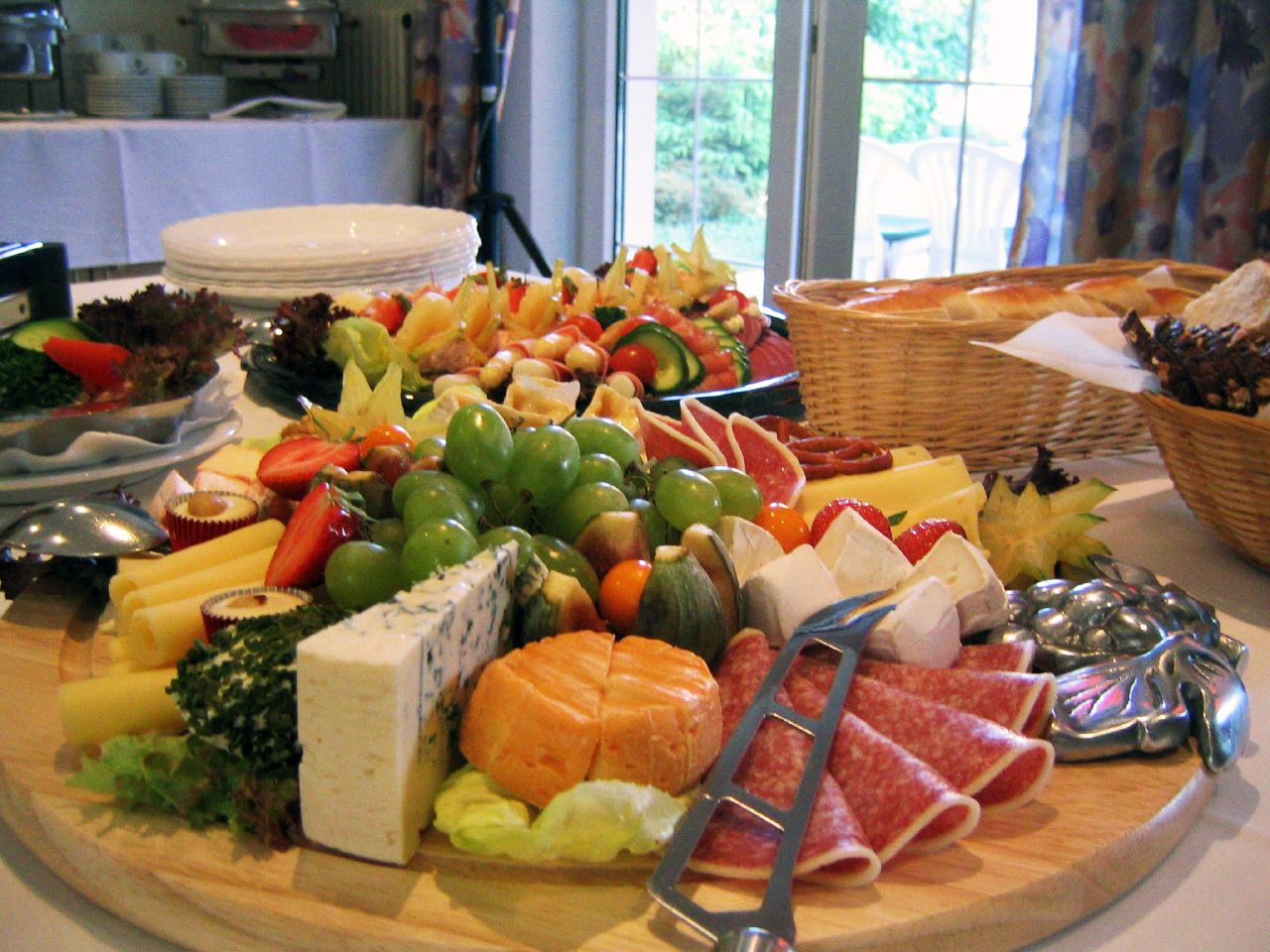
Ham and cheese in a German breakfast buffet

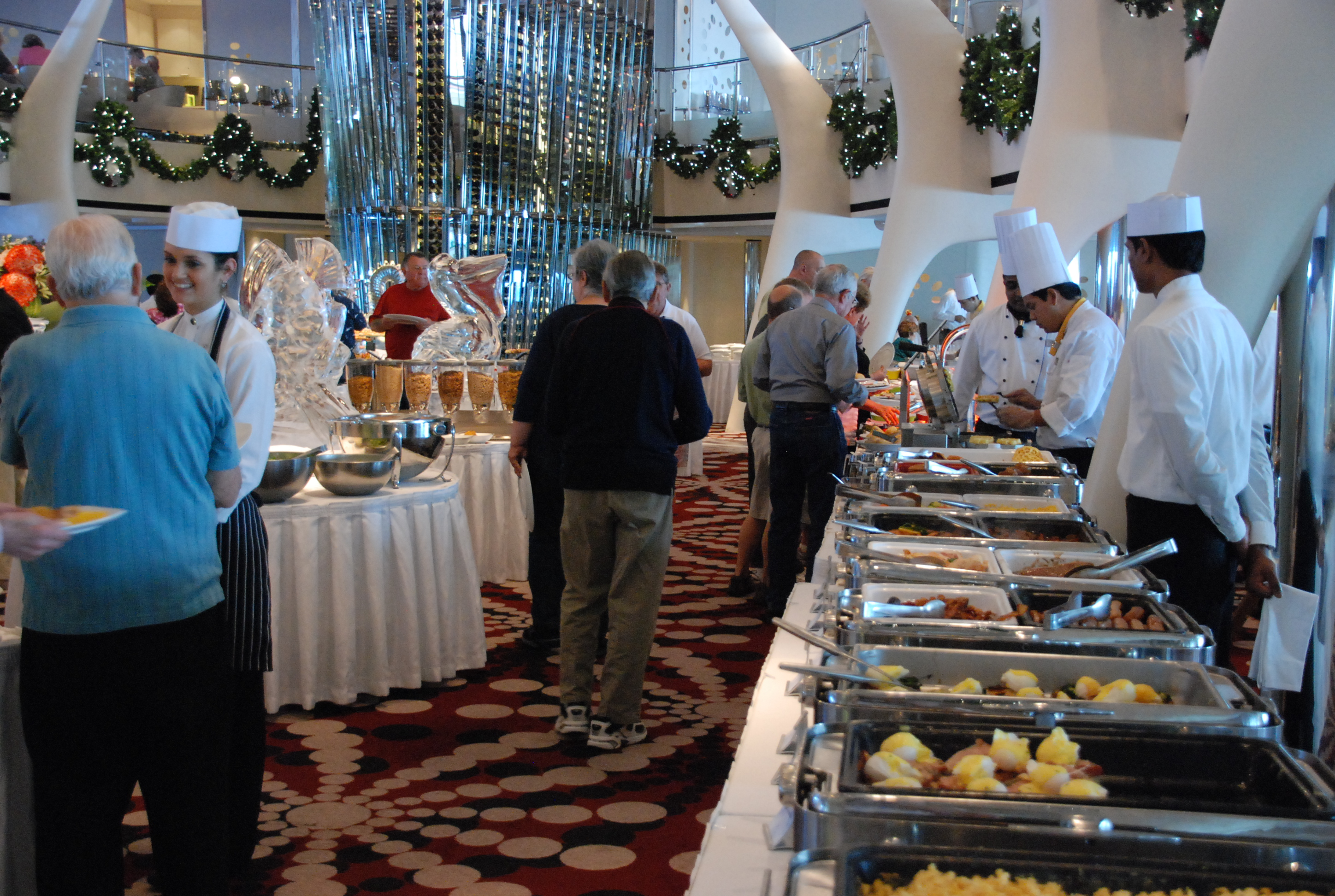
Staffed hot buffet line aboard the Celebrity Equinox cruise ship

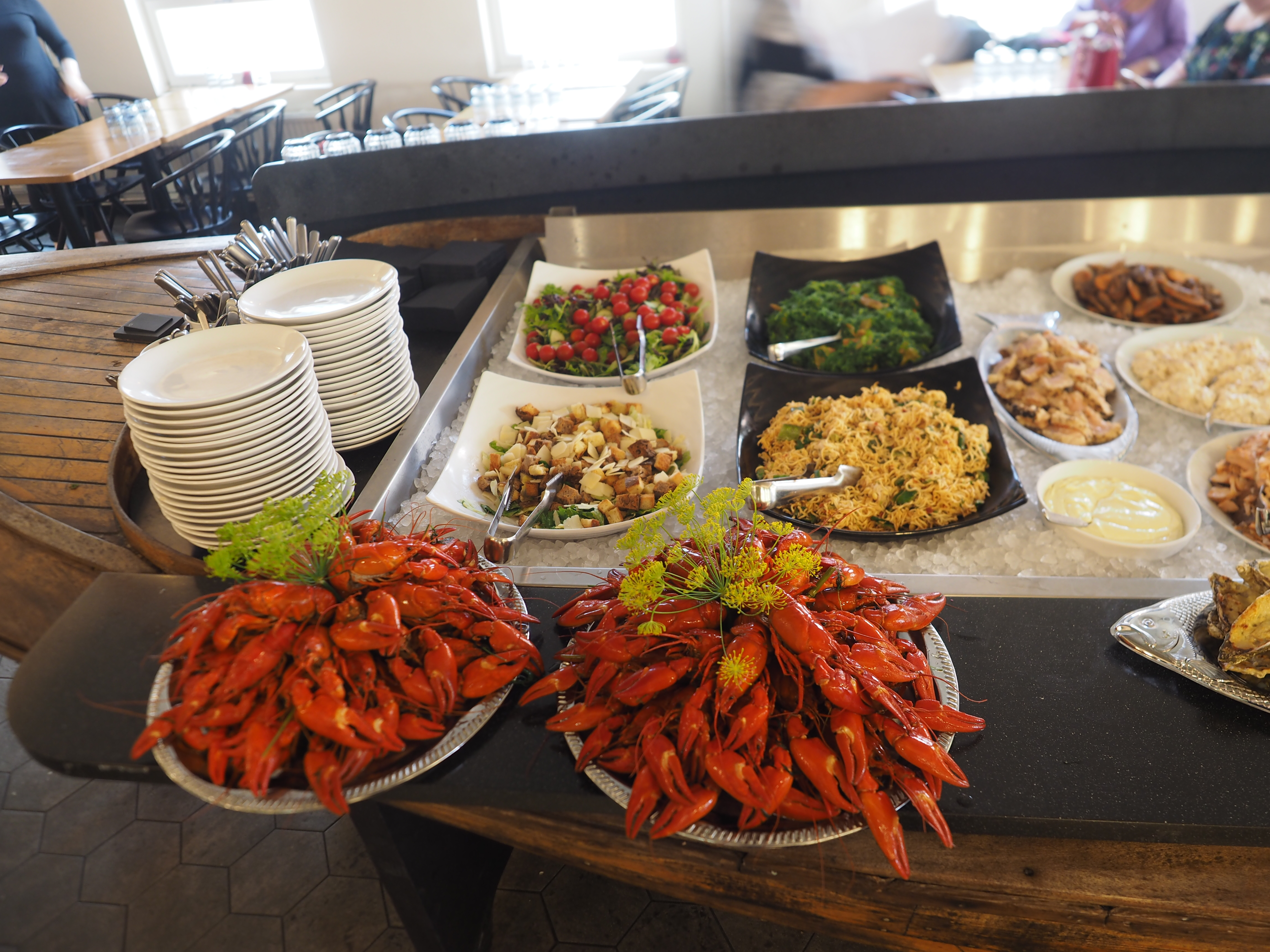
A crayfish buffet at restaurant Tukkutorin kala in Kalasatama, Helsinki, Finland

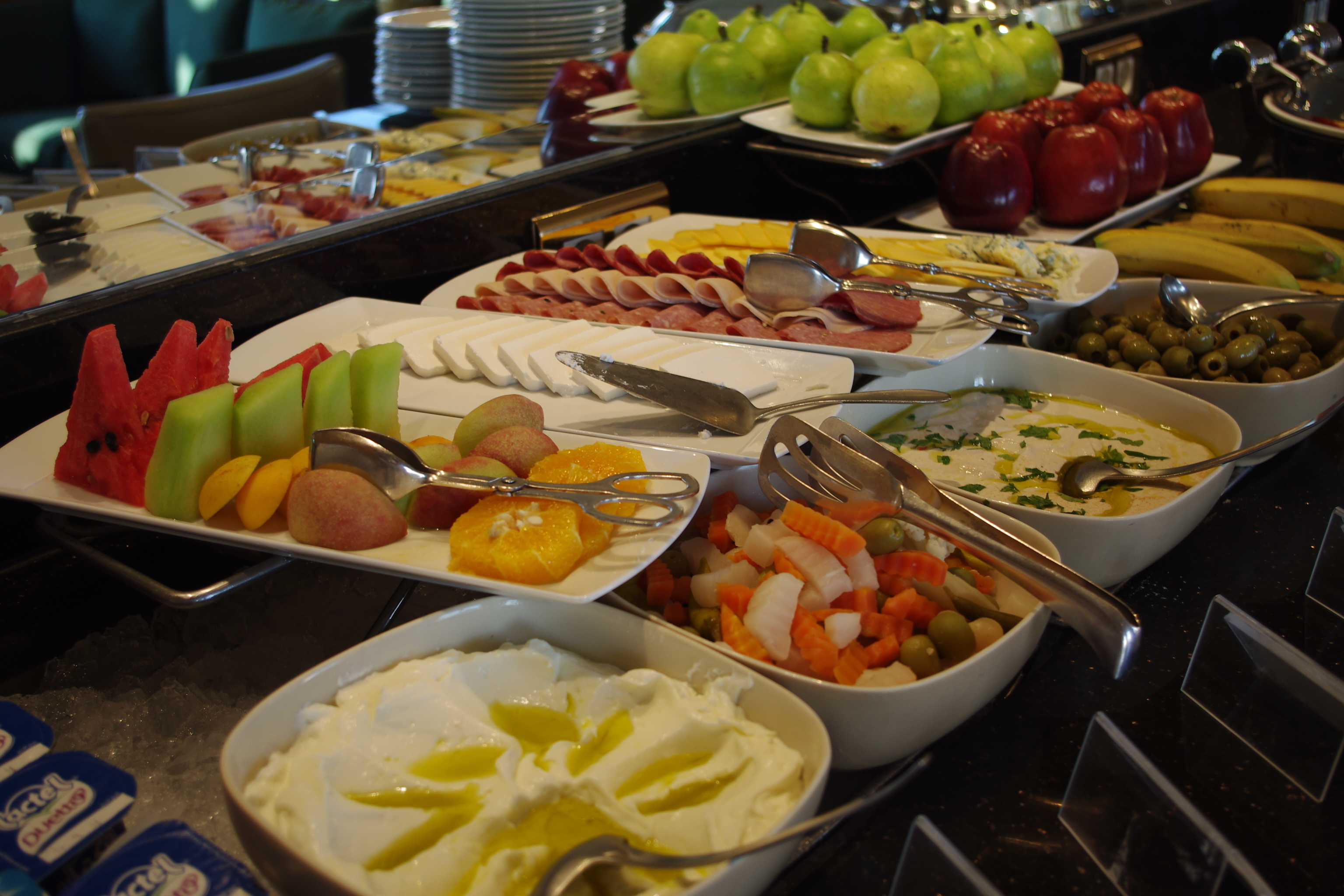
Breakfast buffet

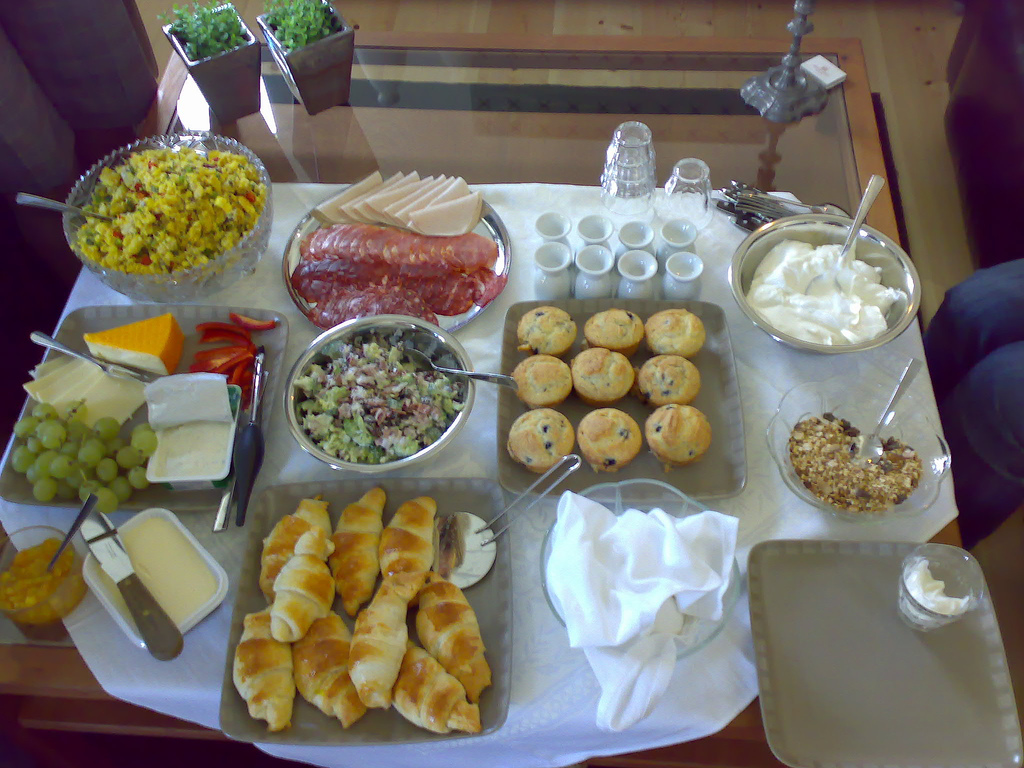
Brunch buffet

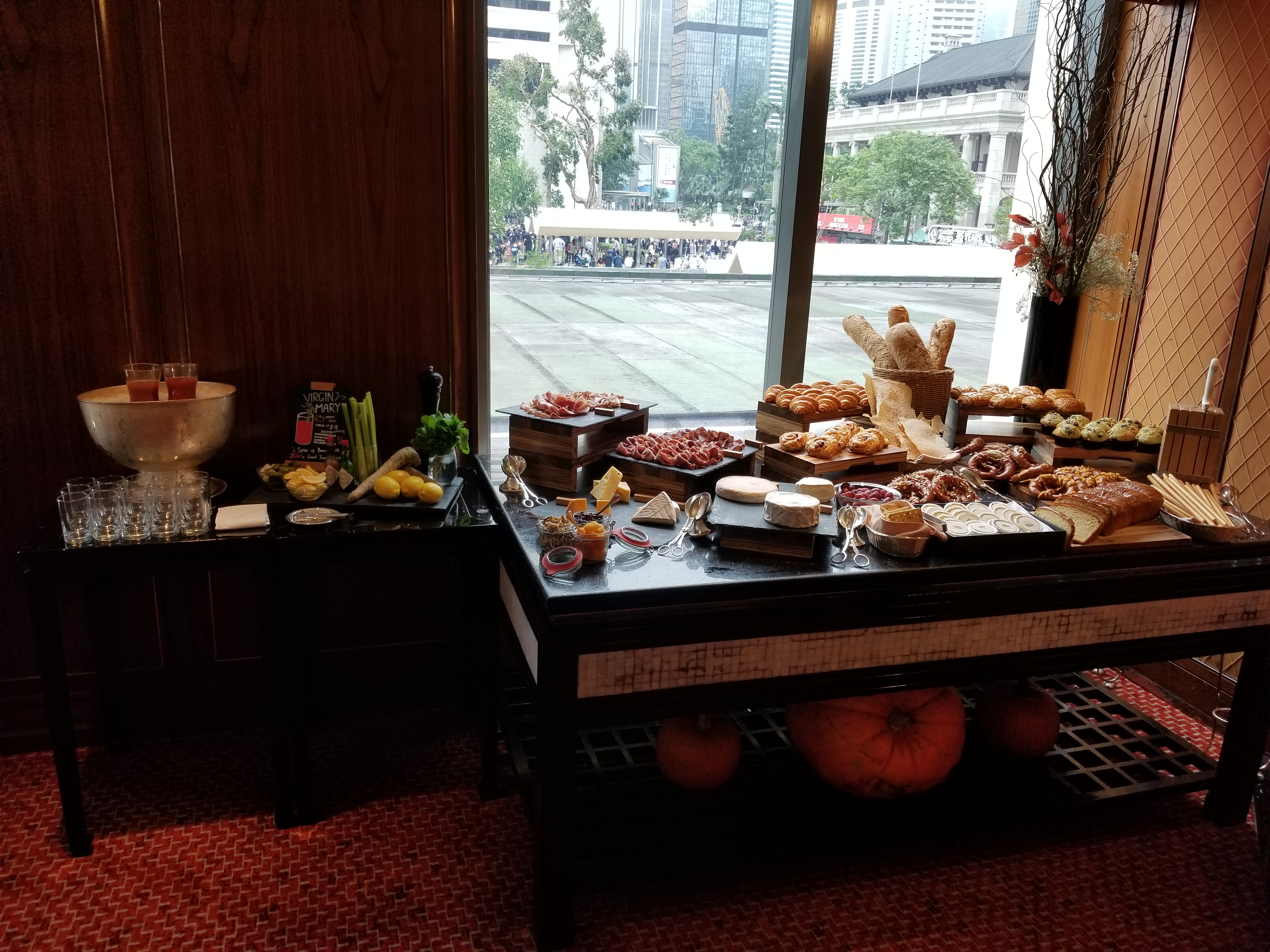
Cheese, coldcuts, and bread station in brunch buffet

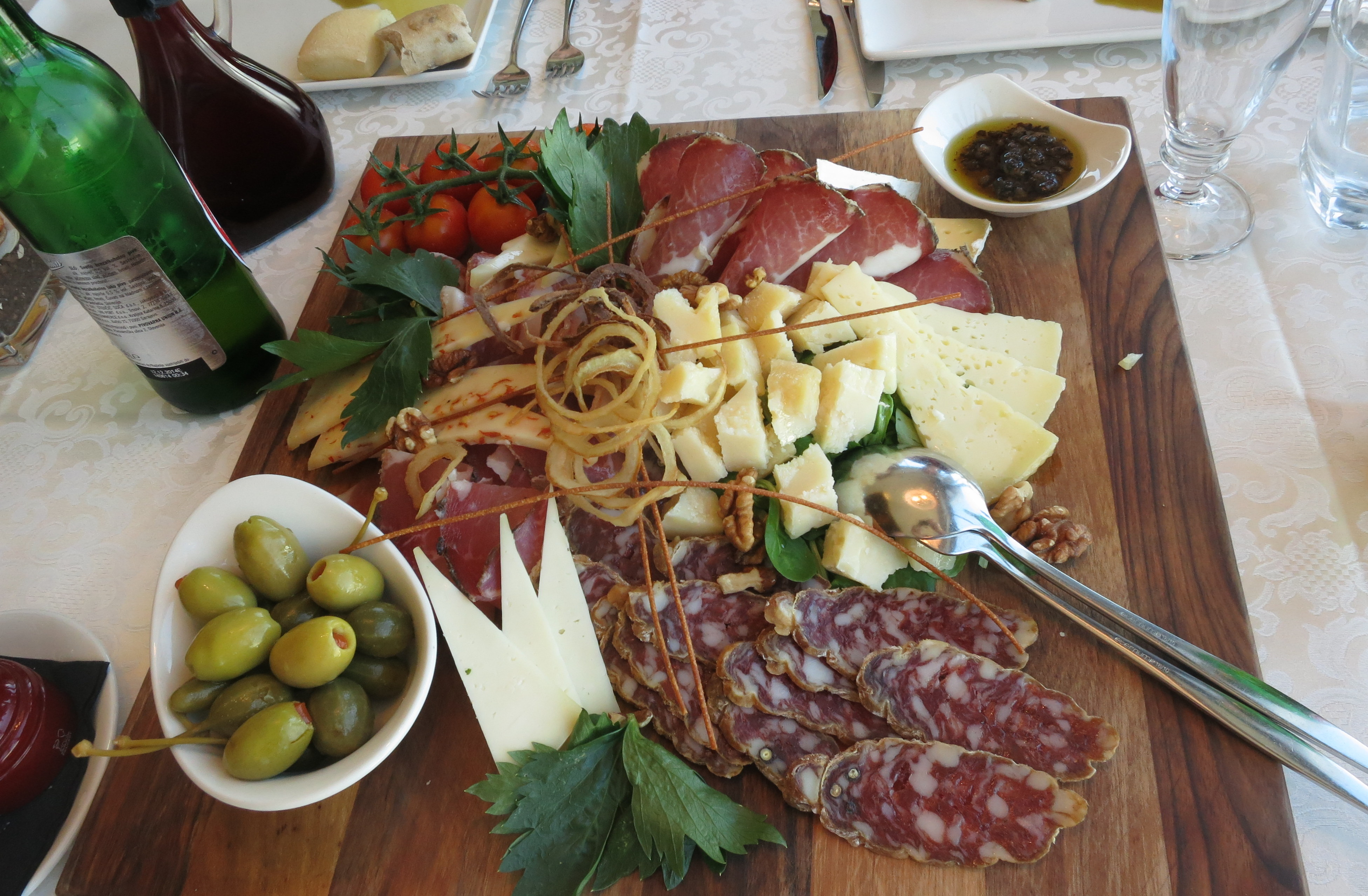
A platter of lunch meat and cheeses in Slovenia

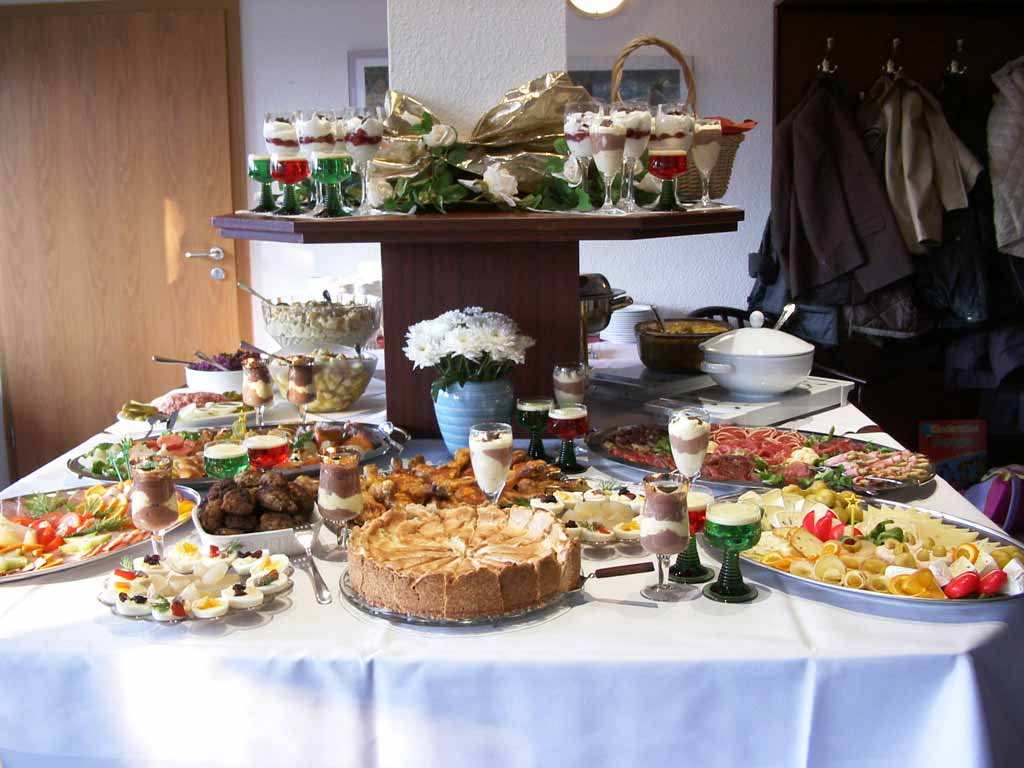
German-style dinner buffet

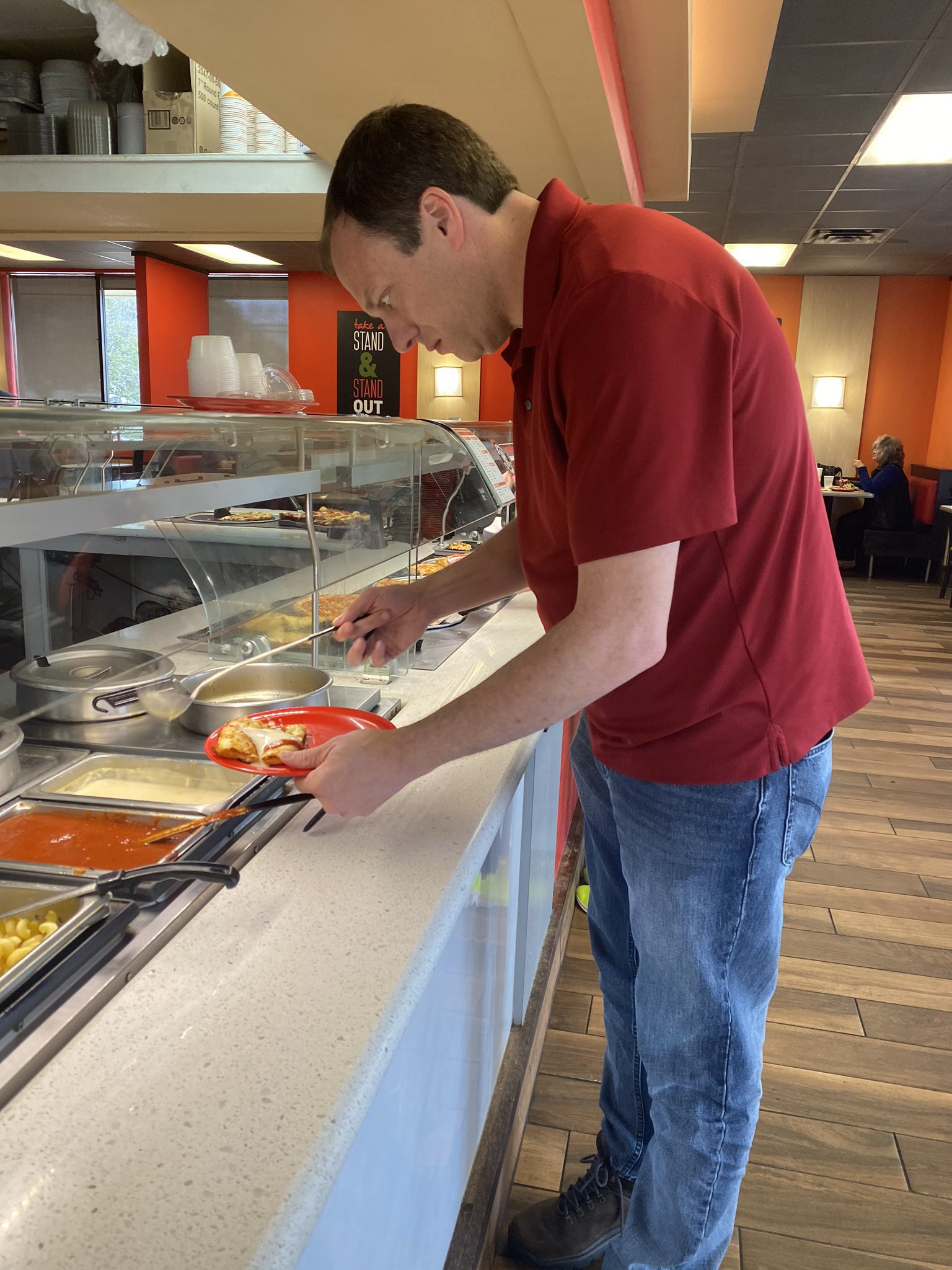
Cafeteria-style self-service buffet

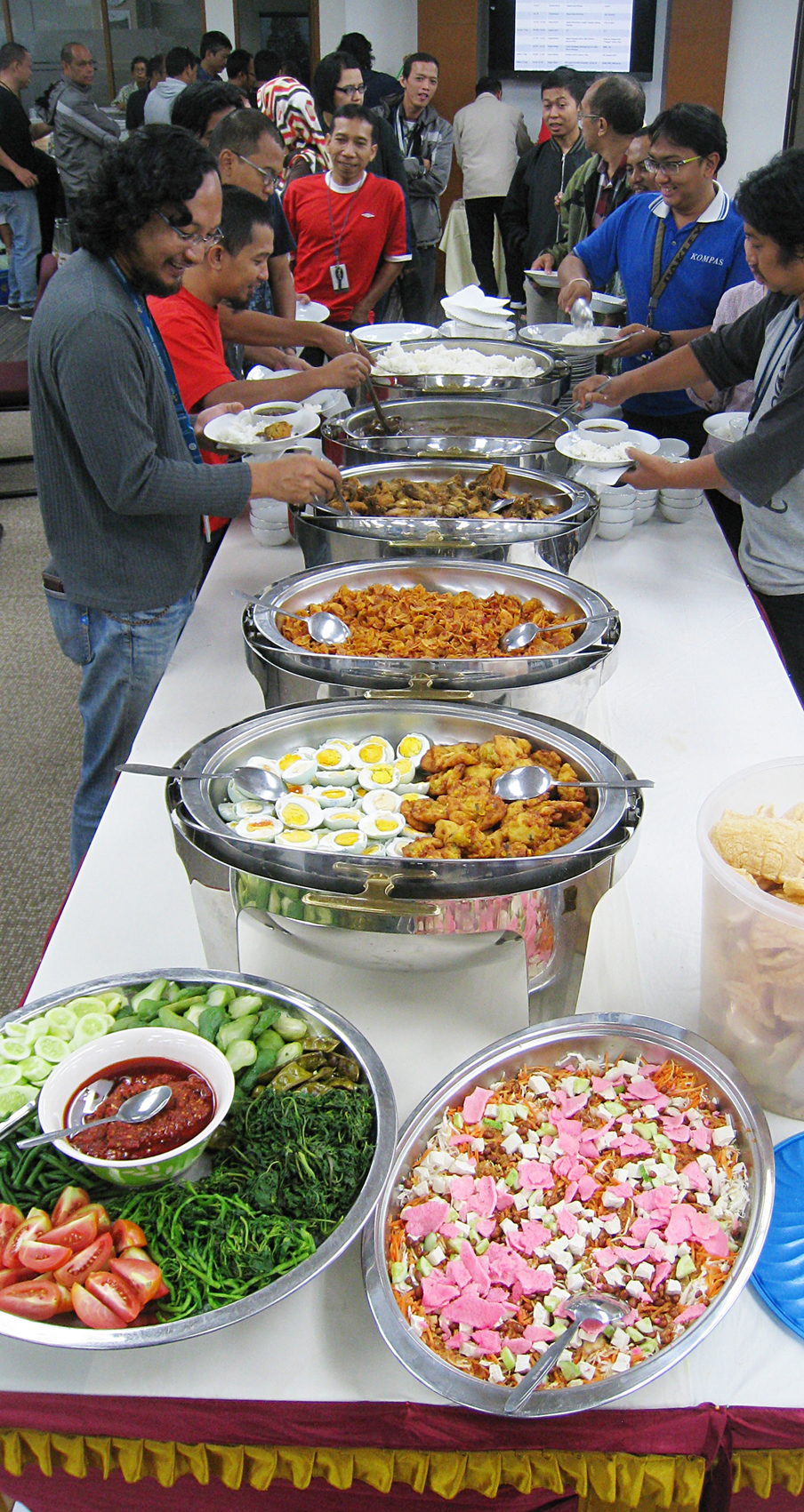
Prasmanan, Indonesian-style buffet

== See also ==
- All-you-can-eat restaurant
- Buffet car
- Catering
- Food safety
- Food warmer
- Free lunch
- List of buffet restaurants
- List of cafeterias
- Potluck
