= Barbecue restaurant =

Restaurant that specializes in barbecue-style cuisine and dishes

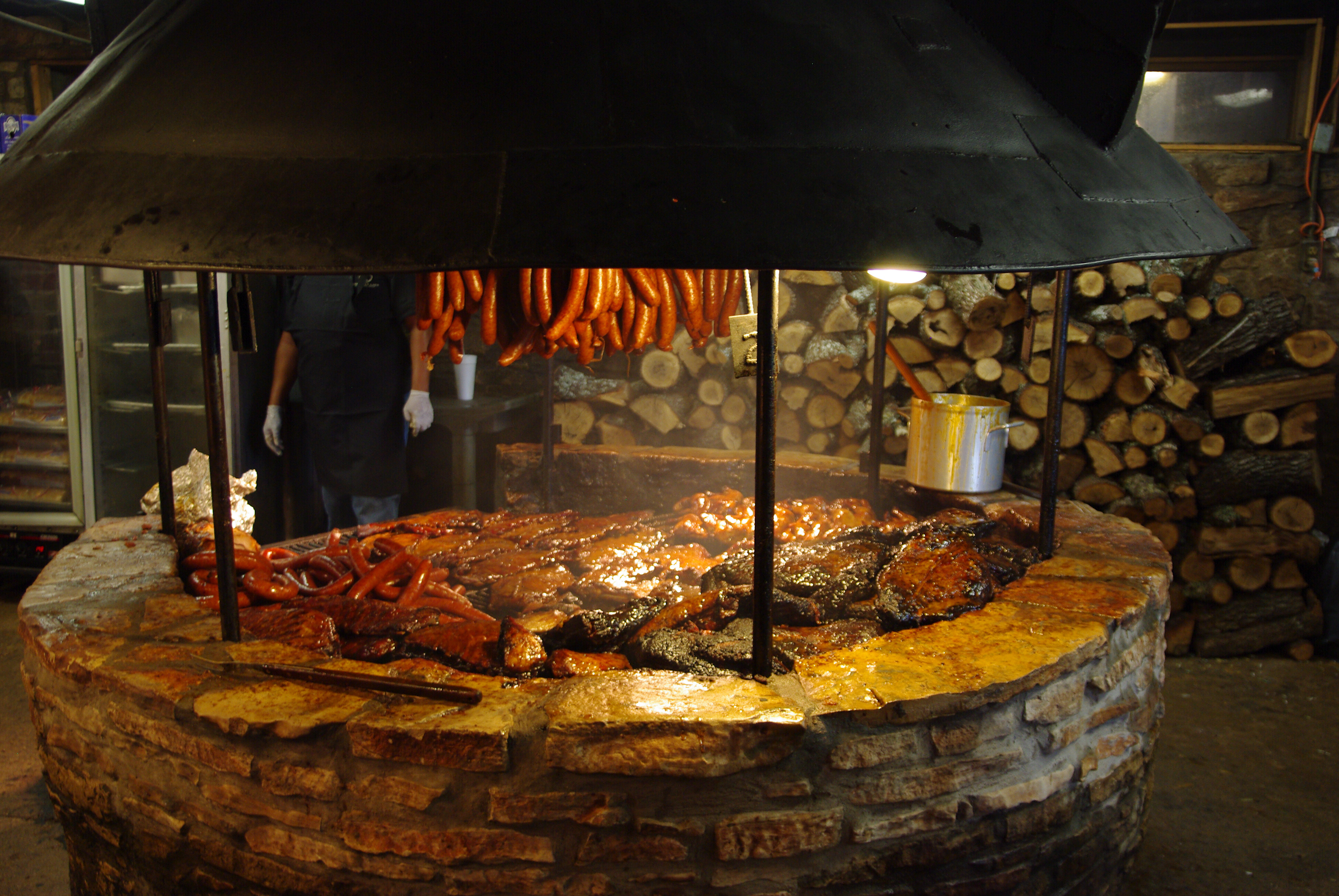
Several types of meats being cooked in a pit at a barbecue restaurant

A barbecue restaurant is a restaurant that specializes in barbecue-style cuisine and dishes.

== Nomenclature ==
=== United States ===
In northern and midwestern areas of the United States, a barbecue restaurant may be referred to as a "barbecue joint". In southern areas of the country, a barbecue restaurant may be referred to as a "barbecue" or "barbecue place", rather than as a barbecue restaurant. Some barbecue restaurants may be referred to as "shrines" or as a "barbecue shrine", which can refer to those that have earned a strong reputation for purveying high-quality food over the course of several years, and even over the course of generations.

=== Portugal and Brazil ===
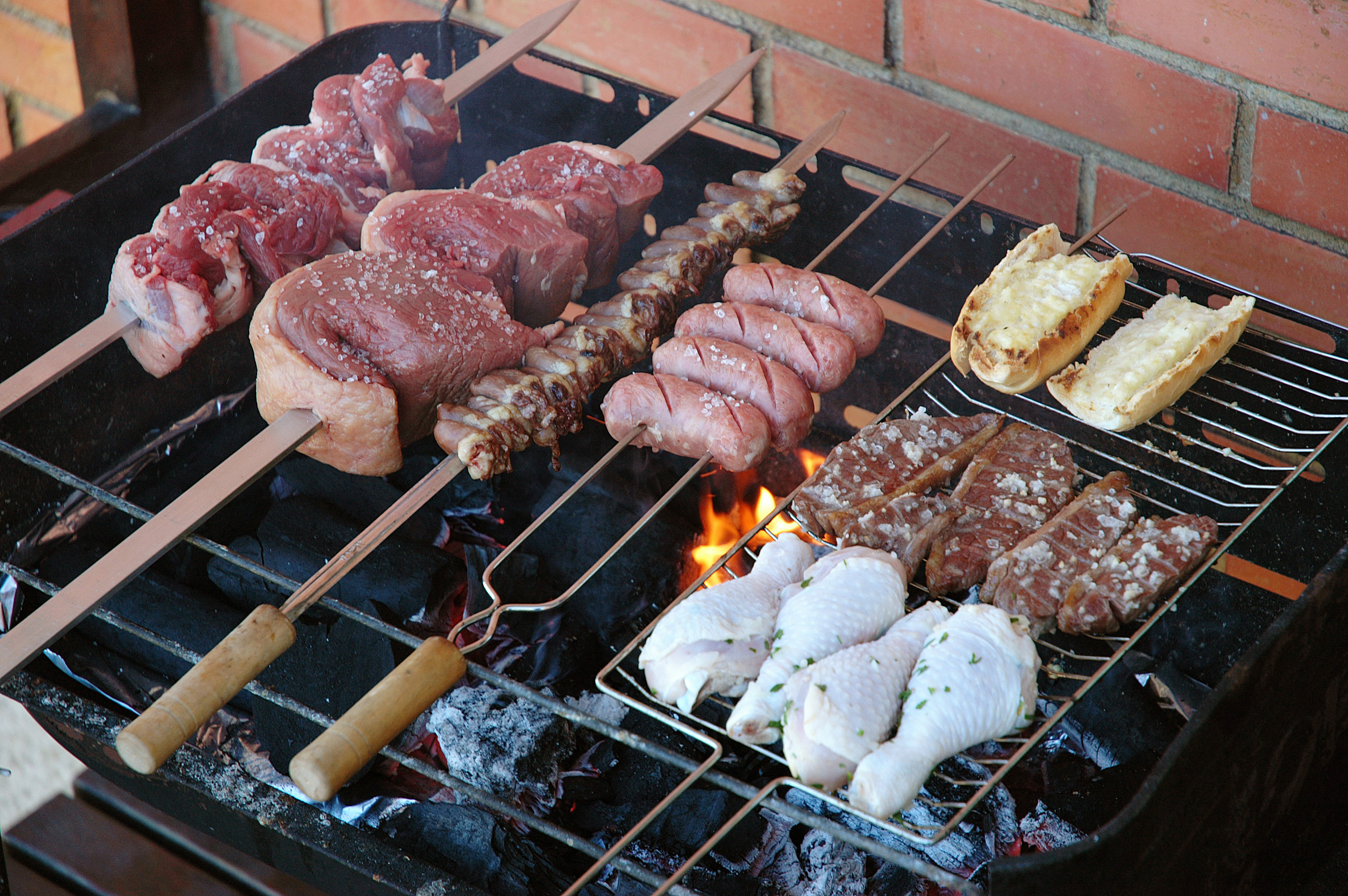
Brazilian churrasco

A churrascaria is a place where meat is cooked in churrasco style, which translates roughly from the Portuguese for 'barbecue'. A churrasqueiro is somebody who cooks churrasco style food in a churrascaria restaurant. Some churrascarias offer all-you-can-eat dining in a style that is referred to as rodízio. They may offer many types of barbecued meats. In Brazil, a churrascart is a food cart that serves churrasco, and they are common in the country.

== Operations ==
Barbecue restaurants may open relatively early compared to other restaurants, in part to optimize sales while barbecued foods being slow-cooked by the process of smoking are being tended to by restaurant personnel on premises. In some instances, this can enable the sales of barbecued meats that began being smoked the night before the next business day. Per these logistics, a significant portion of their sales may occur during lunchtime. Additionally, high lunch turnover at barbecue restaurants may occur per the foods being cooked and sold in large batches. Popular food items may sell out earlier compared to others, which may encourage customers to arrive earlier.

=== England ===
Some barbecue restaurants in London, England include London's Pitt Cue Co. and Barbecoa, the latter of which is owned by Jamie Oliver.

=== Mexico ===
In Central Mexico, barbecue outlets are common and numerous in midsize to large size cities, and often exist at roadside stalls in outlying areas of the metropolitan area. These outlets may not qualify as being restaurants per se, although they often offer the same types of foods. These outlets may offer barbacoa-style foods. In this region, when quantities of meats are depleted, the restaurant or outlet typically closes.

=== Philippines ===
Mongolian barbecue restaurants are popular in the Philippines. In 1991 it was suggested that this may be due in part to the economic recession that was occurring in the early 1990s, because Mongolian barbecue restaurants operate as affordable buffets that enable diners to eat as much as they desire.

=== South Korea ===
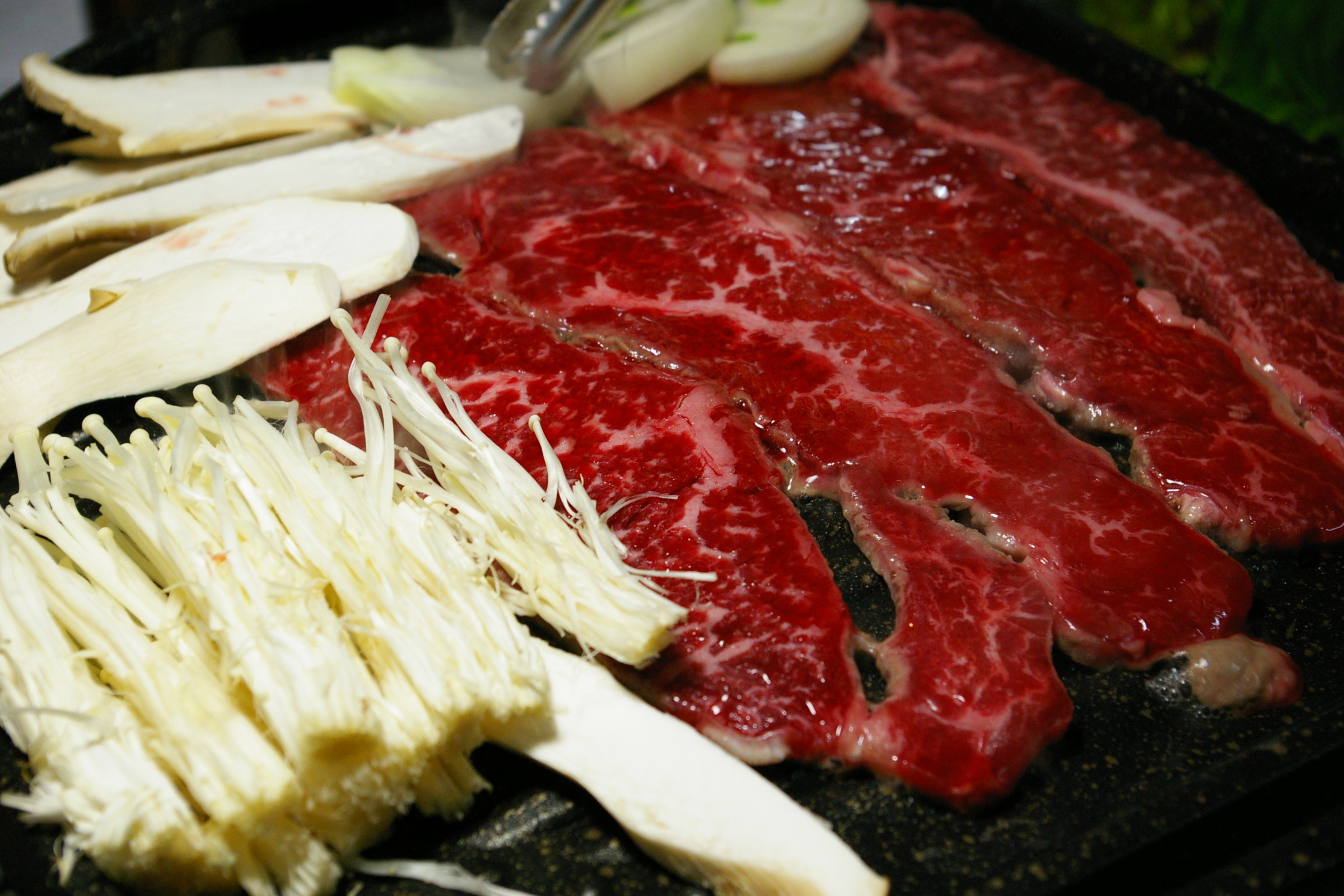
Korean barbecue at a restaurant in South Korea

Barbecue restaurants in South Korea are referred to as gogi-jip (English: "meat house"). They are very common and popular in Seoul. Daedo Sikdang and Nongoljip are Korean barbecue restaurant franchises that both originated in Seoul.

=== United States ===
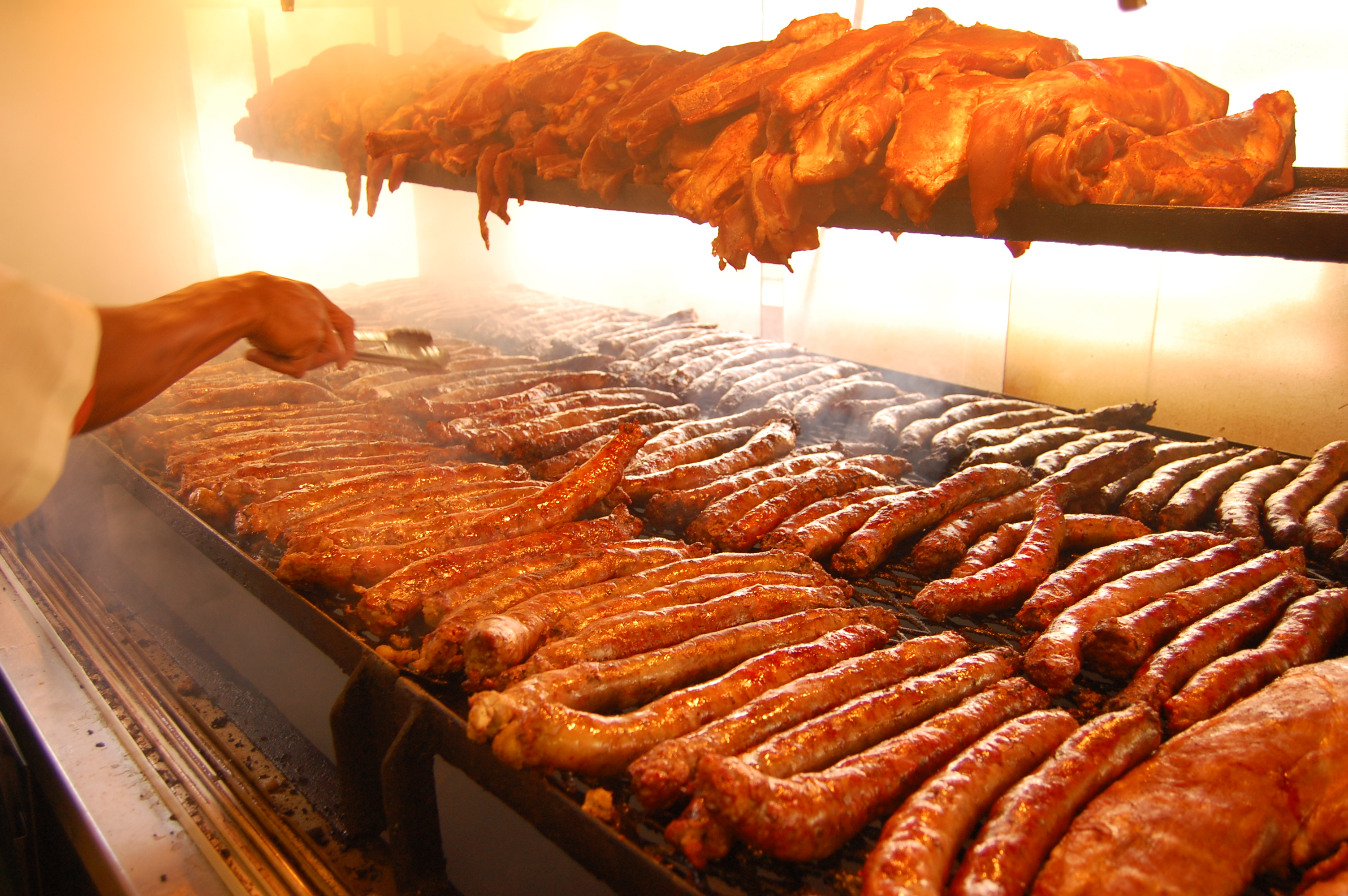
Meats being cooked at a barbecue restaurant in Chicago, Illinois

Barbecue restaurants may have one or more pitmasters that oversee the preparation and cooking of foods, along with maintaining fire and food temperatures. The word "pitmaster" is derived from "the ability to control the fires of the pit". The sizes of barbecue restaurants can vary, ranging from very large to smaller-sized buildings, and some exist as mobile food trucks and food booths.

In the US, some restaurant chains exist, such as Sonny's Real Pit BBQ, which is a franchise that in 2010 was the largest barbecue restaurant chain in the US with over 130 stores; Smokey Bones, with over 70 stores in 2010; and Rib Crib, with 41 stores in 2008. Dickey's Barbecue Pit is the largest barbecue franchise in the United States.

Brazilian churrasco BBQ served in the rodizio style is the feature of the Fogo de Chao restaurant chain, which is now based in Texas and has multiple branches internationally. Rodizio Grill and Texas de Brazil are other US-based chains with similar offerings, and there are also many independent churrascaria restaurants in regions with a significant Brazilian population, such as Boston.

== Cuisine ==
In the United States, barbecue restaurants may offer dishes that are slow-smoked or barbecued over a grill. Fare includes barbecue sandwiches, brisket, barbecue chicken, pulled pork, pork shoulder, pork ribs, beef ribs, beefsteak and other foods. Various side dishes are typically available, such as baked beans, macaroni and cheese, coleslaw and corn on the cob, among others. A variety of barbecue sauces may be available, and some barbecue restaurants bottle their own sauces for customer purchase. Some barbecue restaurants prepare their foods without any sauces, and may not offer any as condiments. This may occur per a preference for the flavor of the meats to stand on their own, rather than being accentuated with flavors from sauces. Some barbecue restaurants use a dry spice rub to flavor meats.

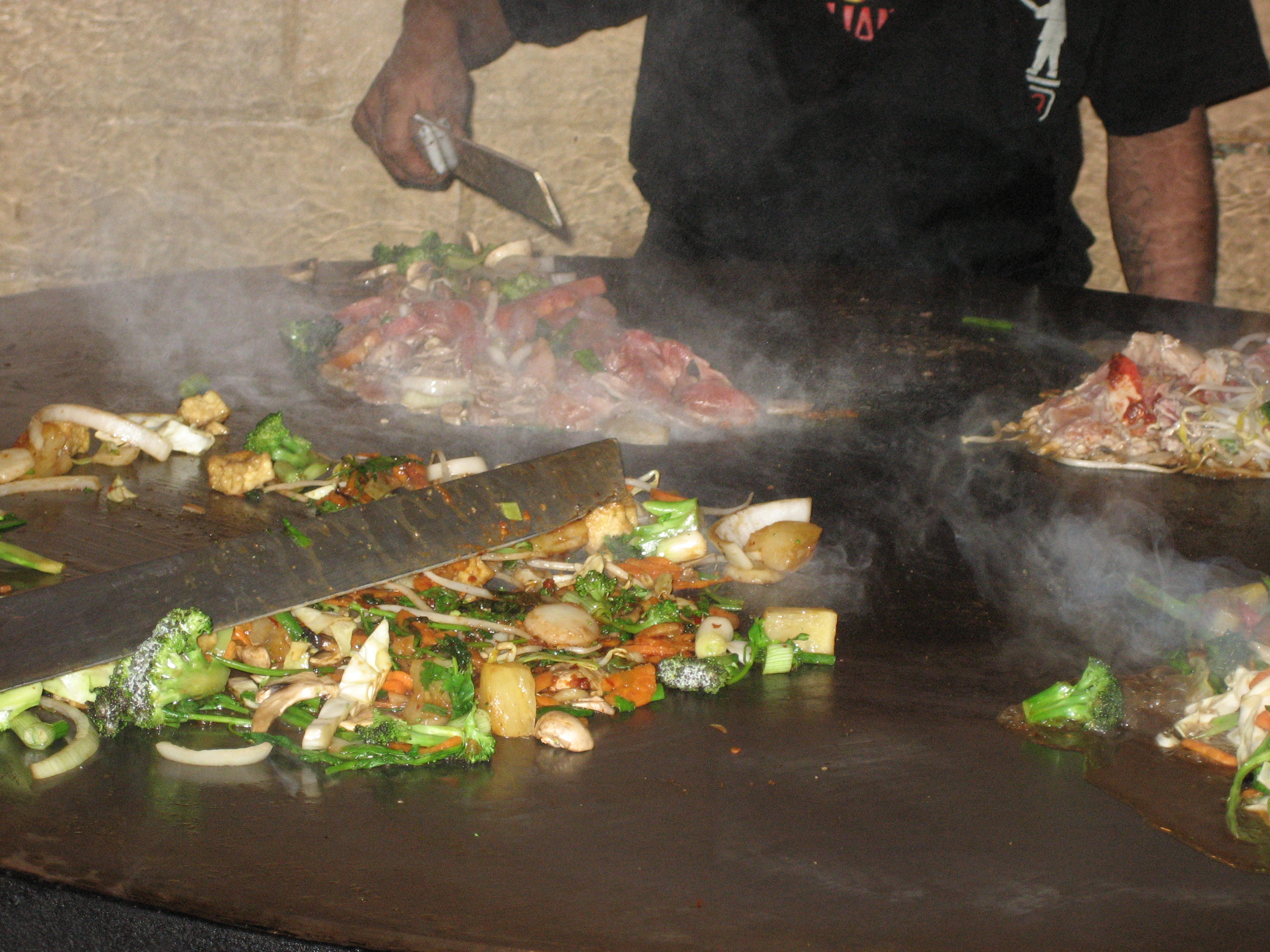
Mongolian barbecue being prepared

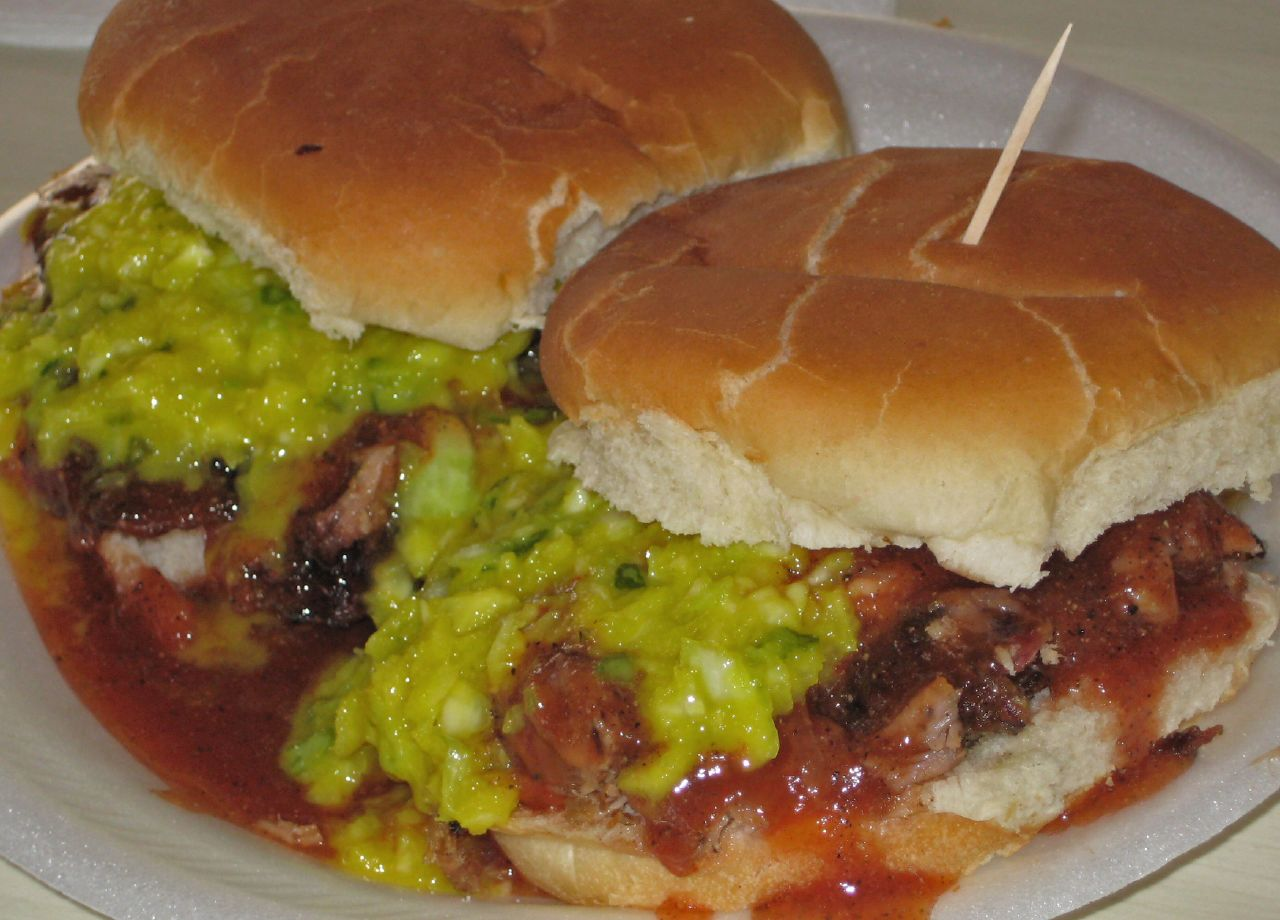
Barbecue sandwiches at a barbecue restaurant

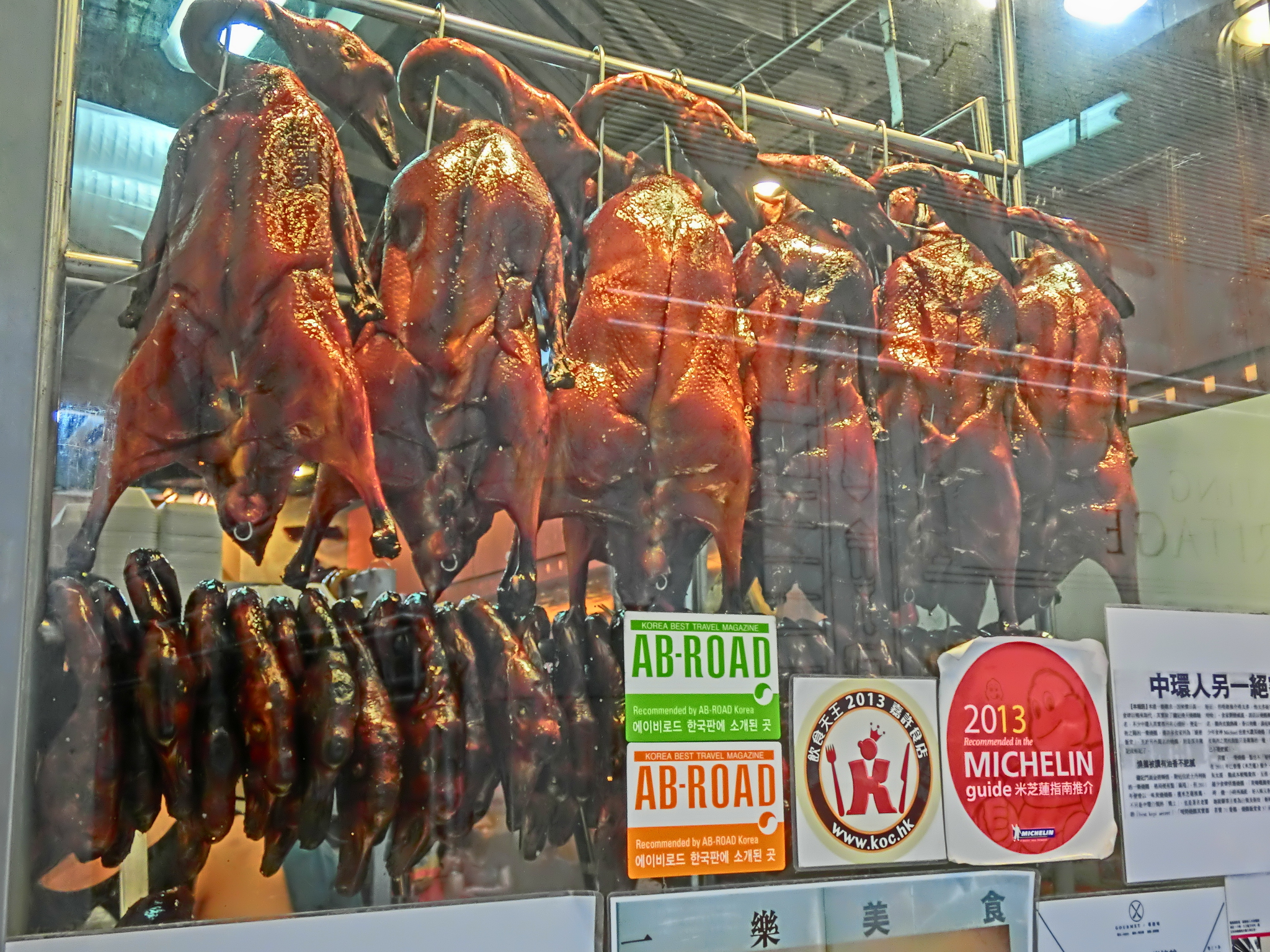
Poultry at Yat Lok Barbeque Restaurant in Hong Kong

== See also ==
- Air pollution
- Korean barbecue
- Particulates
- Regional variations of barbecue
- Shao Kao
- Steakhouse
- Types of restaurant

== Bibliography ==
- Mills, M.; Tunnicliffe, A.M. (2005). Peace, Love, & Barbecue: Recipes, Secrets, Tall Tales, and Outright Lies from the Legends of Barbecue. Rodale. pp. 129–164. ISBN 978-1-60529-254-0.
