= Tafelspitz =

Dish made of boiled meat in Viennese cuisine

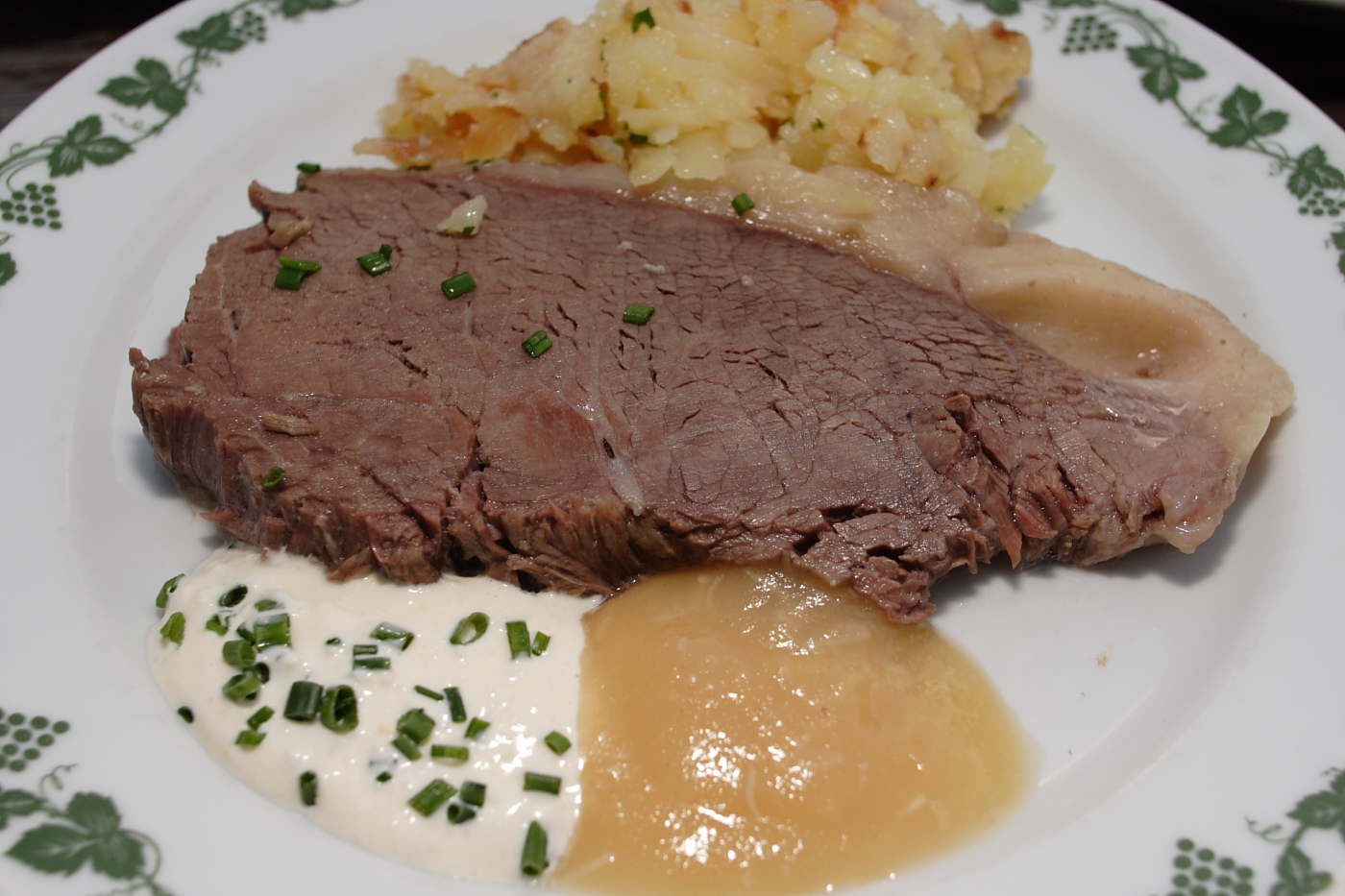
- Place of origin: Austria
- Main ingredients: beef, apples and horseradish

Tafelspitz (German Tafelspitz, pronounced [ˈtaːfl̩ˌʃpɪt͡s]; top of the table) is boiled veal or beef in broth, served with a mix of minced apples and horseradish. It is a classic dish of the Viennese cuisine and popular in all of Austria and the neighboring German state of Bavaria.

Franz Joseph I, Emperor of Austria, was a great lover of Tafelspitz. According to the 1912 official cookery textbook used in domestic science schools of the Austro-Hungarian Empire, "His Majesty's private table is never without a fine piece of boiled beef, which is one of his favorite dishes."

== The dish ==
Tafelspitz is simmered along with root vegetables and spices in the broth. It is usually served with roasted slices of potato and a mix of minced apples and horseradish or sour cream mixed with chives.

== The cut ==
The Tafelspitz is located at #13.

Tafelspitz is the Austrian name of the meat cut which is used, usually from a young ox. This cut is typically known in the United States as the standing rump or top round, depending on the nomenclature of cuts used. The British cut is called "topside"; in Australia, it is called the rump cap. Brazilian cuisine prizes essentially the same cut as picanha for churrasco (grilling). It is the top hind end of the cattle where the tail originates. Alternatively, it may be a similar cut of beef from a young ox, properly hung, with firm white fat (not yellow). The fat can be left on to prevent the meat from becoming dry.

Austrian butchers gave almost every muscle of beef a separate name. The hind leg alone is parted into 16 cuts: there are, for example, the Hüferscherzl, Hüferschwanzl, Nuss, Wadlstutzen, Gschnatter, Schwarzes Scherzl, Weißes Scherzl, Dünnes Kügerl, and Schalblattel (also called Fledermaus).

== See also ==
- Boiled beef, a traditional English working-class dish
- Pot-au-feu, a traditional French dish
