= Rodizio Grill =

Brazilian steakhouse restaurant

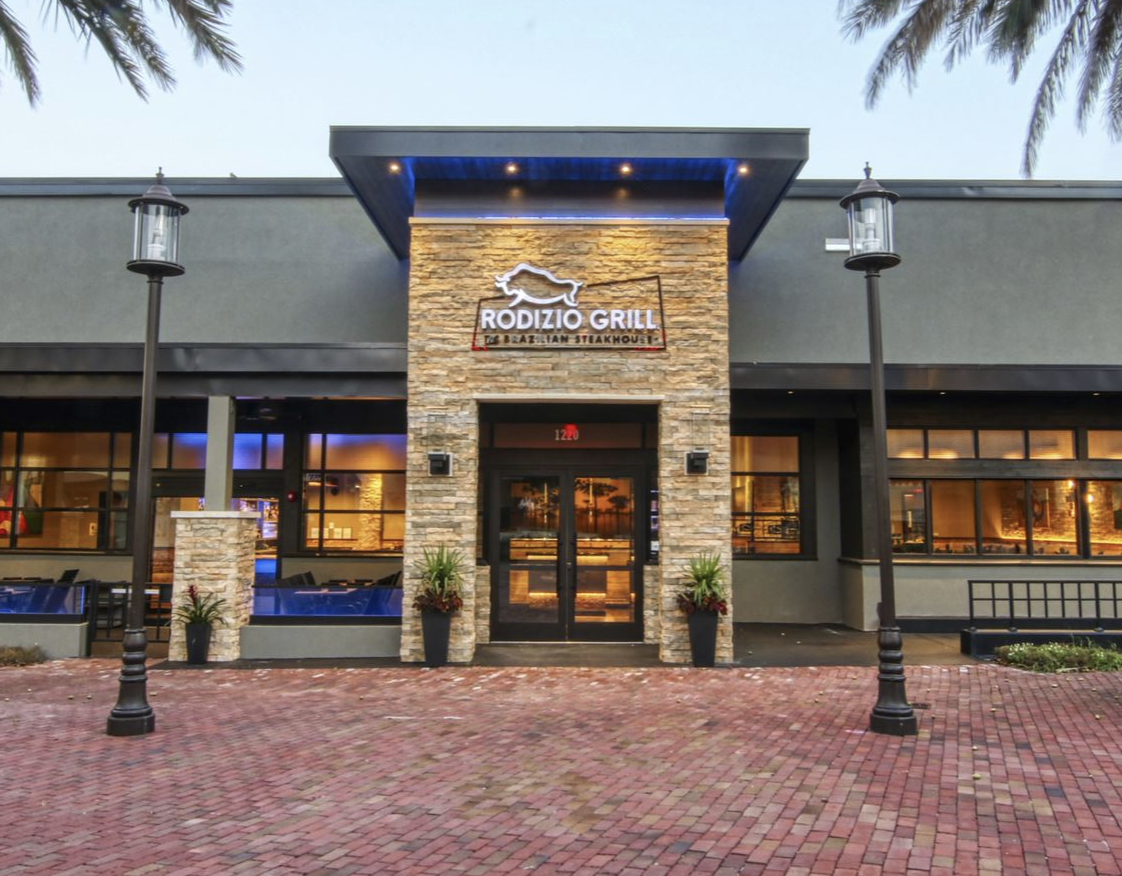
- Rodizio Grill Orlando
- Type: Private
- Industry: Restaurants
- Founded: Littleton, Colorado (1996; 30 years ago)
- Founder: Ivan Utrera
- Headquarters: Sandy, Utah,
- Number of locations: 26
- Products: Food service
- Revenue: US$41.1 million (FY 2020)
- Number of employees: 1200+ (2020)
- Parent: Phoenix Restaurant Group LLC
- Website: www.rodiziogrill.com

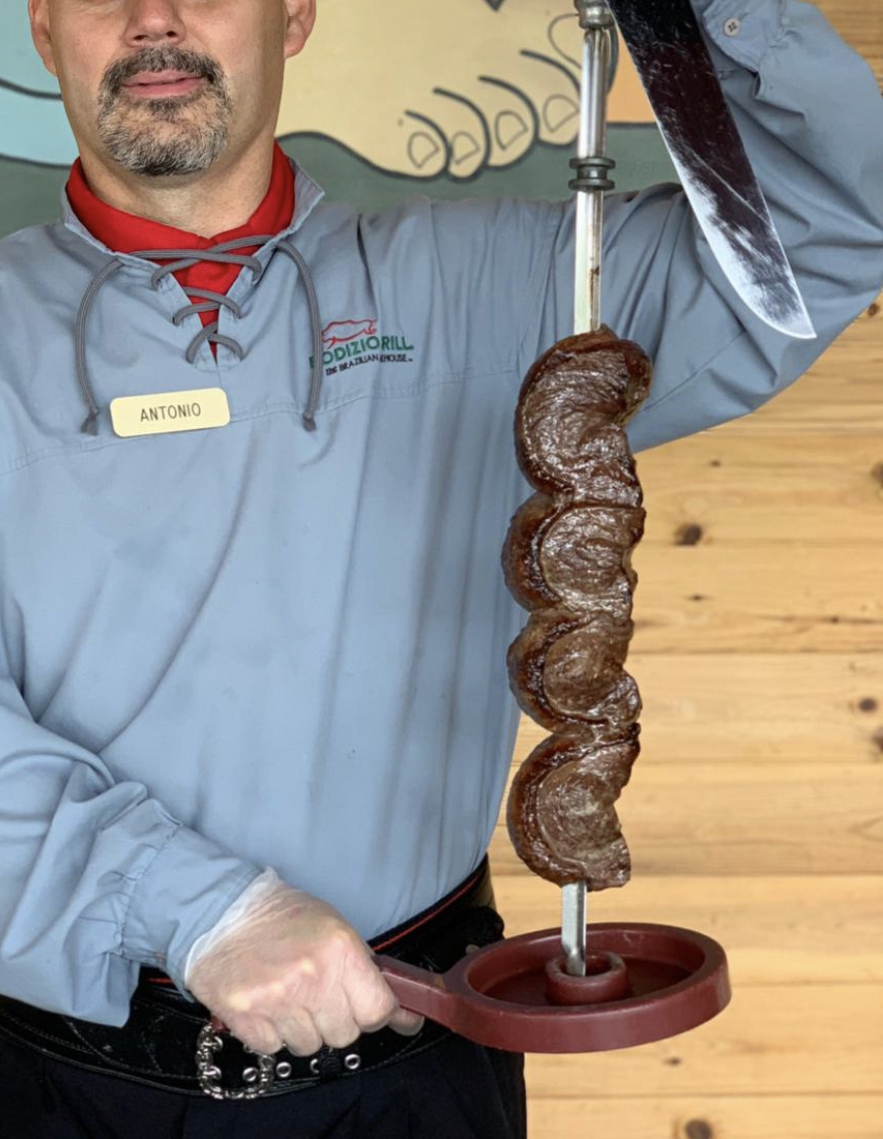
Rodizio Grill gaucho serving picanha (top sirloin)

Rodizio Grill is a Brazilian steakhouse restaurant, or churrascaria, that was established in the United States. It was founded in 1995, the first to be established in the United States, by founder and president Ivan Utrera, a native Brazilian born in São Paulo. As of June 2026, there are 26 locations in the United States.

== Concept ==
Rodizio Grill's business model follows a traditional Brazilian churrascaria concept, with a central salad bar serving pre-made and house-made salads and a hot bar with traditional Latin American offerings like rice and beans. The main feature of any churrascaria is the service of protein options, which are presented on 3-foot (0.91 m) long skewers in a continuous rotation, and which are carved at tableside by servers per guest preference.

Rodizio Grill periodically introduces promotional menu alterations, such as their Wild Game Fest or Bacon Fest.

== History ==
Rodizio Grill founder Ivan Utrera grew up in São Paulo, Brazil, where the traditional churrasco (barbeque) style of dining is common and popular. An entrepreneur from an early age, Utrera had an interest in business which led him to pursue higher education in the US. There he supported himself as a janitor until earning a master's degree in Business Administration from Brigham Young University's Marriott School of Management in 1992.

Utrera served as Marketing Director for Pizza Hut and its parent company, PepsiCo for its Latin American markets until he was made Marketing Director over US Markets. At that time, however, he began to feel stifled by the constrains of a large corporate environment and began to explore the idea of opening a restaurant of his own.

In 1995, Utrera left PepsiCo to develop his own restaurant, basing his concept on the traditional Brazilian churrascaria (steakhouse) model. In 1996 in Littleton, Colorado, he opened the doors of Rodizio Grill, the first churrascaria in the US.

In 1999, Nation's Restaurant News awarded the company the "Hot Concepts Award." By the year 2000, Rodizio Grill had opened six restaurants, including its flagship store in Salt Lake City, Utah, and was earning revenues of $14 million per year. Though many of those early locations would close down, by 2009 the company embraced its first franchisee in Fort Collins, Colorado. Franchising has proved successful, bolstering Rodizio Grill to 22 locations in 13 states as of June 2020.

== Community involvement and sponsorships ==
Rodizio Grill supports Image Reborn Foundation which helps breast cancer survivors by providing weekend retreats to survivors at no cost to participants. The individual restaurants support a variety of local charities and nonprofits.

Rodizio Grill sponsors Bruno Carneiro, a Formula 3 racecar driver.

== See also ==
- List of steakhouses
