= Fogo de Chão =

Brazilian chain of steakhouses

Fogo de Chão, Inc.
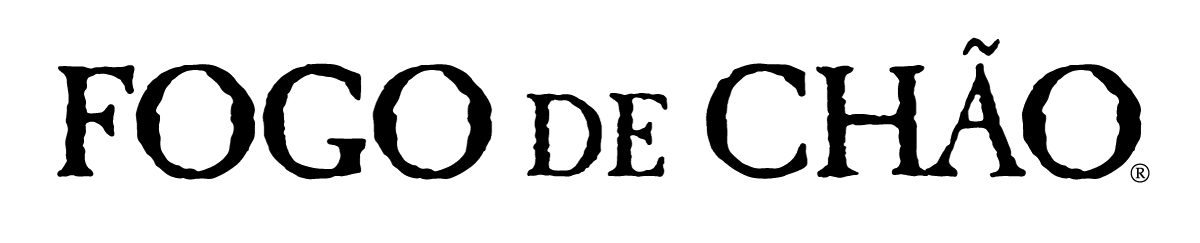

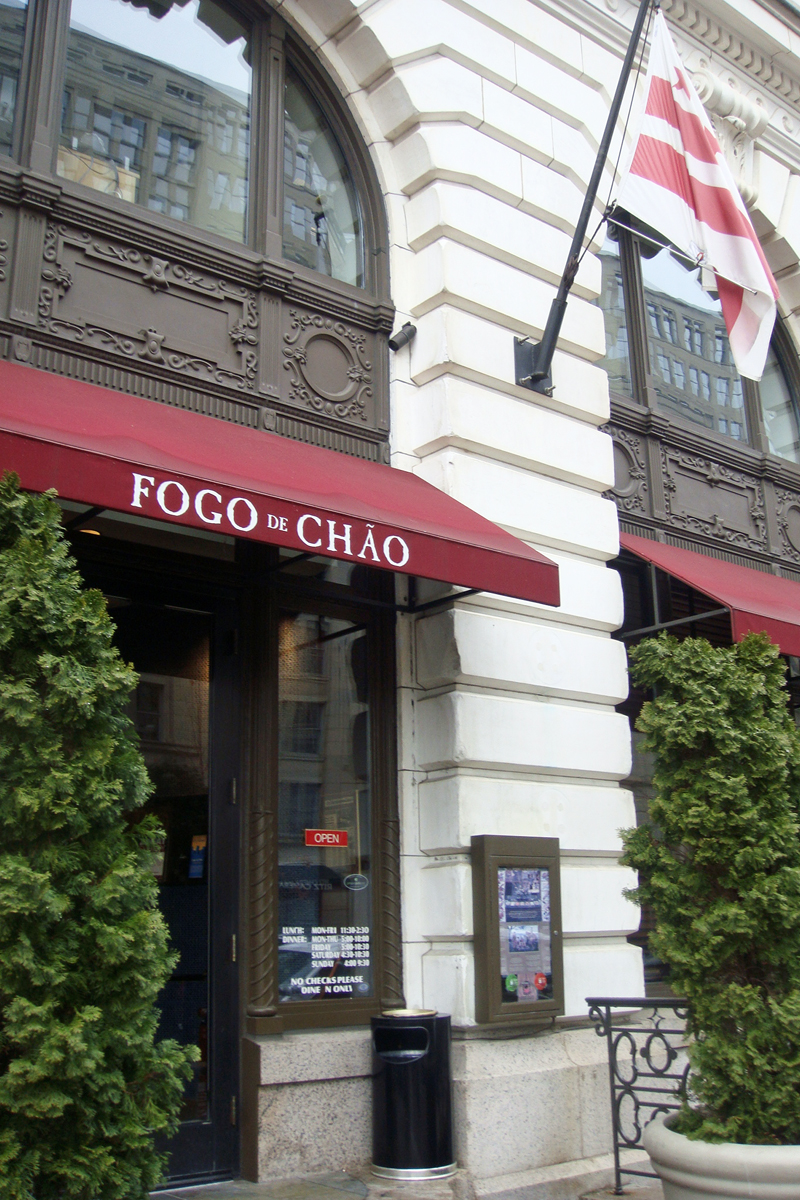
- Fogo de Chão steakhouse in Washington, DC
- Type: Private
- Traded as: Nasdaq: FOGO (2015–2018)
- Industry: Restaurants Franchising
- Genre: Fine dining
- Founded: 1979; 47 years ago
- Founders: Arri and Jair Coser Jorge and Aleixo Ongaratto
- Headquarters: Dallas, Texas, US
- Number of locations: 110+
- Area served: United States, Brazil, Mexico, Saudi Arabia, UAE
- Key people: Barry McGowan (CEO), Wagner lacort (director), Tony Laday (CFO), Rick Lenderman (COO), Janet Gieselman (CMO), Giancarlo Moreira Salles (Board Member), Selma Oliveira (CPO/CCO), Andrew Feldmann (Pres Int'l)
- Products: Churrasco
- Owner: Thomas H. Lee Partners (2012–2015); Rhône Group (2018–2023); Bain Capital (2023–present)
- Website: fogodechao.com

Fogo de Chão, Inc. (Brazilian Portuguese: [ˈfoɡu dʒi ˈʃɐ̃w]; Portuguese for 'Ground Fire') is a Brazilian chain of rodízio-style steakhouses (churrascarias) founded in 1979 by brothers Arri and Jair Coser, along with Jorge and Aleixo Ongaratto. The restaurant chain specializes in Southern Brazilian cuisine, primarily serving churrasco barbecued meats and traditional side dishes. First established in the Brazilian city of Porto Alegre, the chain has over 110 locations throughout Brazil, the United States (including Puerto Rico), Saudi Arabia, the UAE, Honduras, the Philippines, Bolivia, Chile, Ecuador, and Mexico.

== Description ==
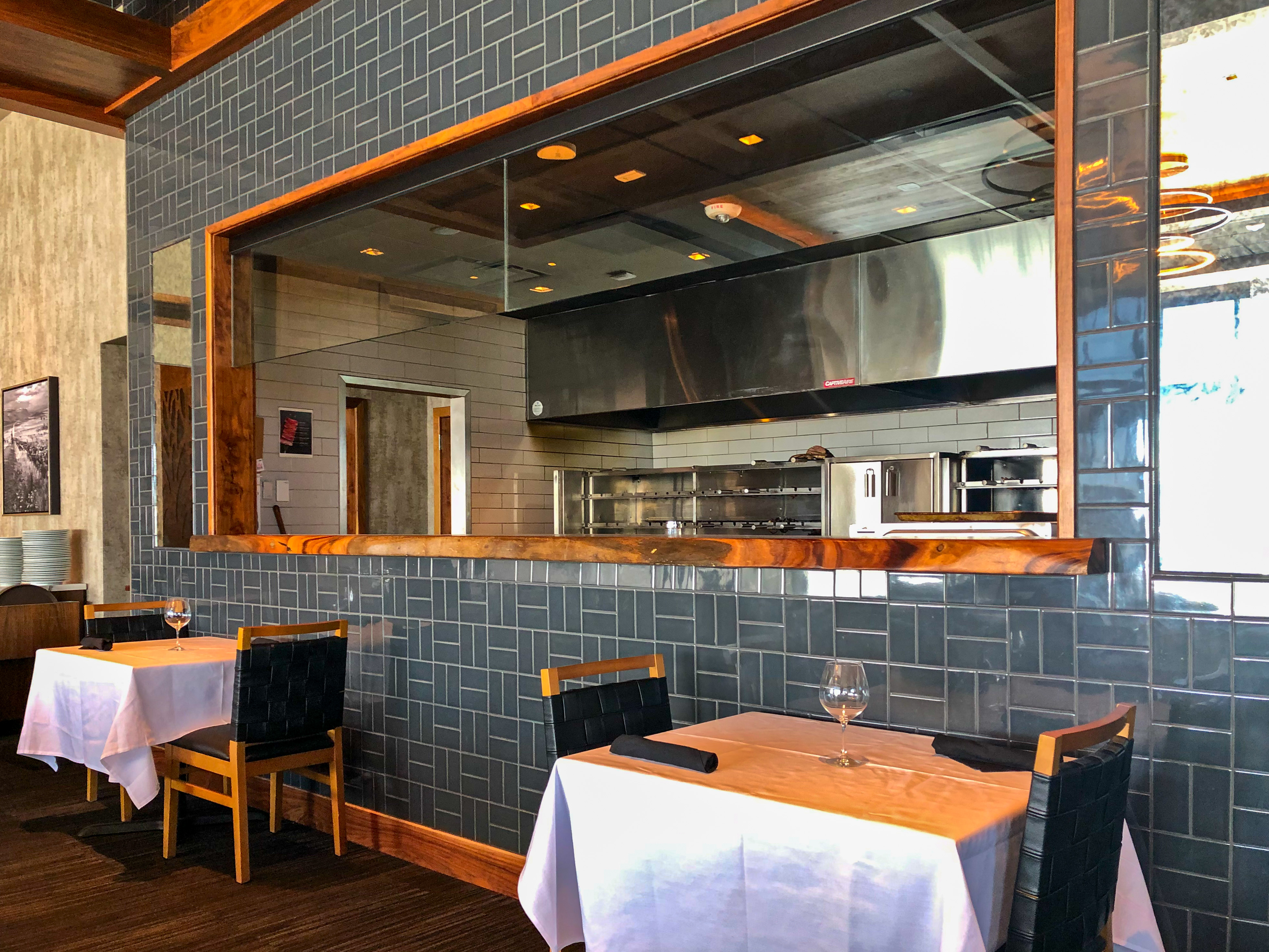
View of "open kitchen" broilers at Carle Place, New York location

The name Fogo de Chão means "ground fire", and refers to the traditional gaúcho method of roasting meats over an open fire. They offer either a "full churrasco experience", which includes continuous servings of fire-roasted beef, lamb, pork, chicken, and other meats, as well as a buffet or à la carte service.

In addition to on-site restaurant service, the company has started to offer takeout service of its most popular food items. Pickup, delivery, and full-service catering at customer sites are now available.

== History ==
The founders of Fogo de Chão, Arri and Jair Coser, grew up on a traditional Southern Brazilian farm in the Serra Gaúcha. It is here that they learned to cook in the churrasco grilling tradition. Jorge and Aleixo Ongaratto, co-founders of the restaurant, also hailed from the mountainous countryside of Rio Grande do Sul, where they grew up on neighboring ranches. They learned the art of churrasco grilling early in life and later worked as busboys and waiters in various churrascarias in Rio de Janeiro, refining their expertise in traditional Brazilian barbecue. Their combined experience and vision, alongside the Coser brothers, led to the establishment of the first restaurant, a wood structure in the countryside of Porto Alegre, was followed by a second restaurant in São Paulo. As Arri Coser told São Paulo-based writer Rafael Tonon, tourists who came to the São Paulo restaurant encouraged him to open a churrascaria style restaurant abroad.

In 1997, the Cosers opened their first US branch in Addison, Texas. Between 1997 and 2020, the restaurant continued its expansion globally, with 57 restaurants across the US, Brazil, Mexico, and the Middle East. The company announced plans for further growth around the world.

== Ownership ==
The Brazilian private equity firm, GP Investments, made their initial investment in Fogo de Chão in 2006 and sold its shares to American private equity firm Thomas H. Lee Partners in 2012. On April 20, 2015, the company filed for an initial public offering on the Nasdaq stock exchange. It traded there under the symbol FOGO until April 5, 2018, when it was acquired by Rhône Capital. In August 2023, Bain Capital acquired the restaurant chain for a reported $1.1 billion.

== Other activities ==
In April 2019 the Boerne, Texas-based agri-tech company, HerdX announced that it would be partnering with Fogo de Chão to use blockchain technology and digital tagging to trace the provenance of the beef Fogo de Chão serves in its restaurants—ultimately allowing diners, who can scan in a HerdX-generated QR code, to know the name and location of the ranch that raised the cattle. HerdX subsequently completed a similar project with United Parcel Service shipments of Texas ranch-raised beef to Japan.

During the COVID-19 pandemic, Fogo de Chão restaurants in Troy, Michigan, San Francisco, and in other cities, have worked with the non-profit, No Kid Hungry to donate meals to needy families, hospitals, and other institutions.

== See also ==
- List of steakhouses
