= Picanha =

Cut of beef from the top rump

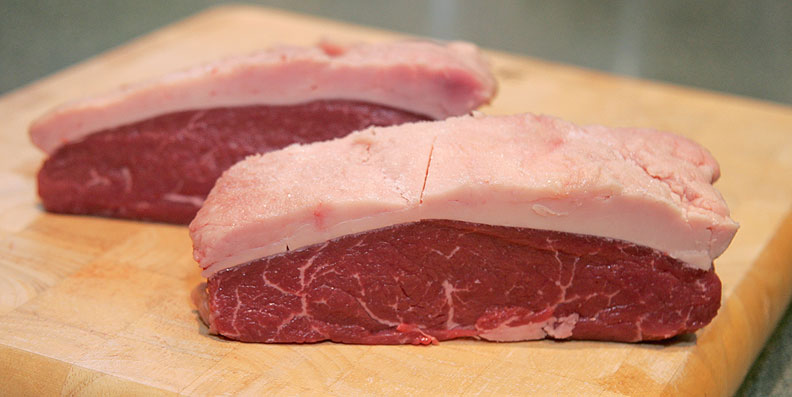
Picanha

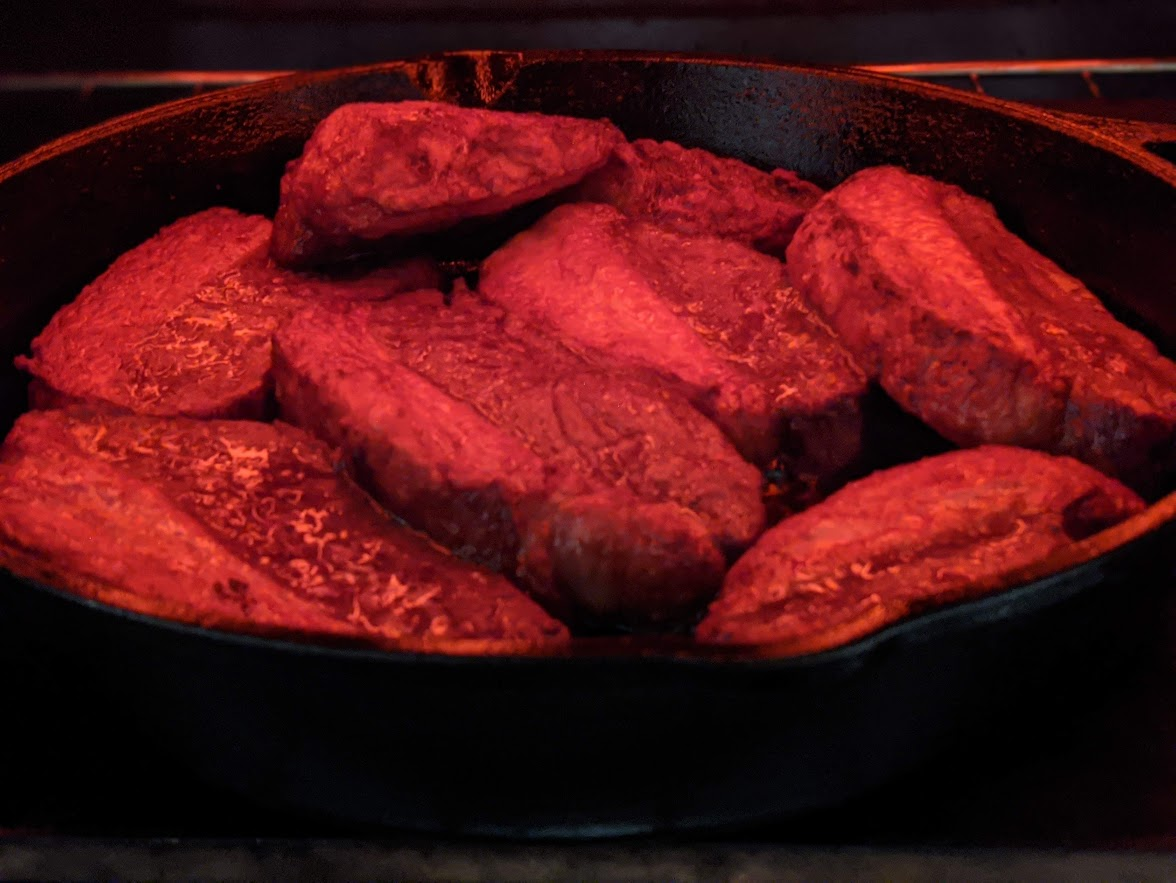
Picanha Under Broiler

Picanha is a cut of beef also known as the rump cap (UK), top sirloin cap (US), or coulotte steak (US). It consists of the terminal, triangular part of the biceps femoris muscle in the rump, together with its fat cap. It became popular first in Brazil and later in Portugal. It is now popular across Latin America in churrascarias and rodízio restaurants.

== Countries ==
Brazilian beef cuts (picanha is number 8).

=== Brazil ===
In Brazil, picanha tends to be the most prized cut of meat. There, the traditional preparation is to skewer the meat and cook it over a charcoal grill, with seasoning consisting solely of coarse sea salt. The fat is retained until the steak has been cooked.

=== France ===
Picanha is known as the pointe de culotte in French butchery, but the fat cap is heavily trimmed in French cuisine. In modern French cuisine, it is a Morceau de 1ère Catégorie and is generally roasted or cut into steaks and grilled. Until the early 20th century, it was the preferred cut for boeuf bourgignon and boeuf à la mode, often larded, as well as for boiling in a pot-au-feu.

=== Portugal ===
Although already known in Portugal as a part of alcatra, picanha and its association with grilling in Portugal were popularized by Brazilian immigrants and Brazilian restaurants starting in the end of the 20th century, taking advantage of the United Kingdom BSE outbreak of the 1990s. It is served in restaurants and is widely available in supermarkets and butchers, both fresh and packaged under vacuum. It is produced mostly within the European Union (Republic of Ireland and Poland) but is also imported from Argentina, Brazil, Paraguay, and Uruguay.

=== United States ===
In the United States, picanha was little known until recently and often named top sirloin cap, rump cover, rump cap, or coulotte (after culotte). American butchers generally divide it into other cuts like rump, round, and loin. Unlike in Brazil, the fat cap tends to be trimmed.

== Etymology ==
The term picanha is of unknown origin. It could be derived from the word picana, which was a pole used by ranchers in the southern parts of Portugal and Spain, particularly in the Alentejo, for herding cattle.

== Cooking methods ==
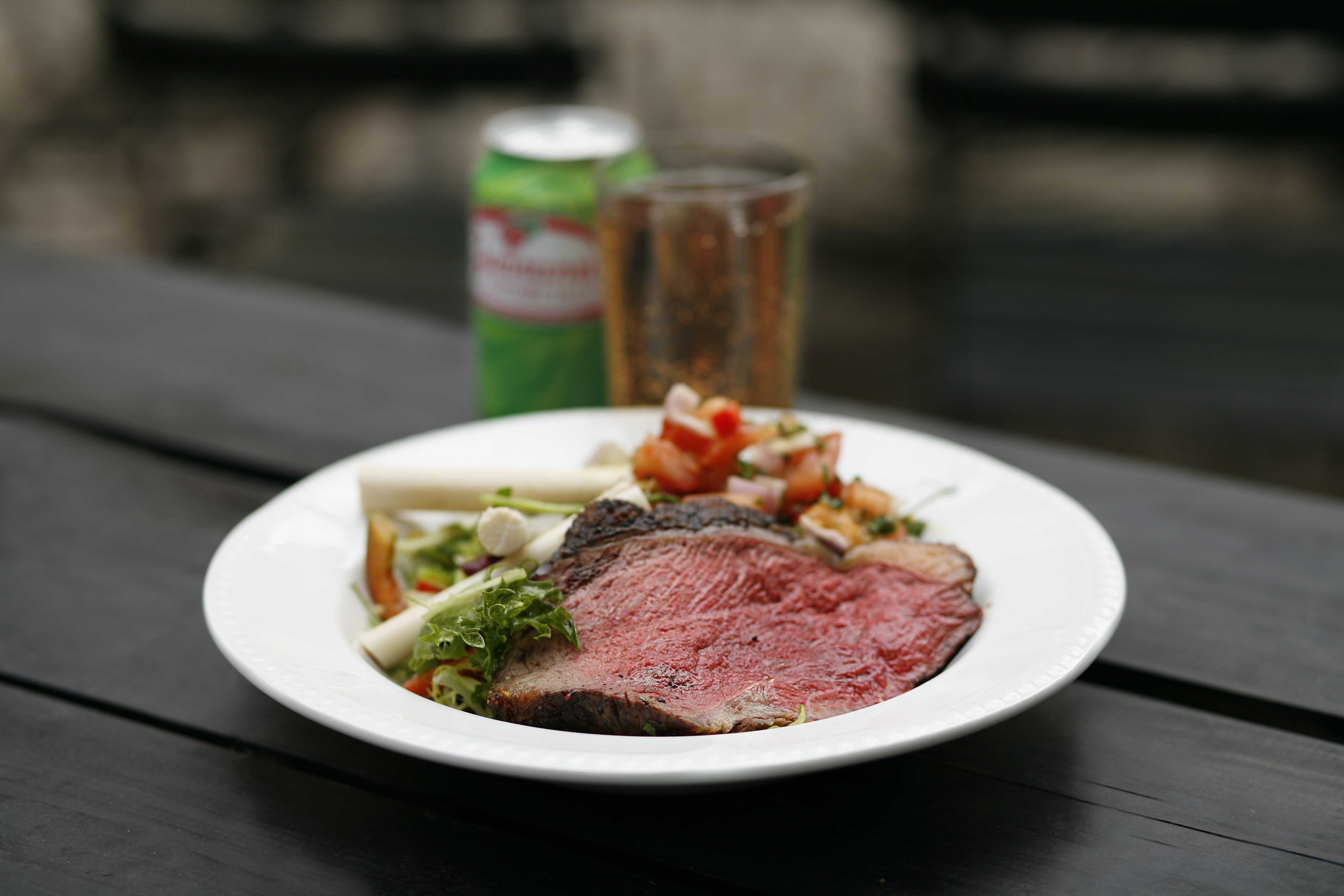
A dish of Brazilian-style picanha.

Picanha can be prepared on the grill, in the oven, on the stovetop, in a frying pan, or sous vide with a variety of spices and accompaniments.

== See also ==
- Churrasco
- Tafelspitz, an Austrian and Bavarian preparation of the same cut by boiling or simmering
- List of Brazilian dishes
