= Texas de Brazil =

Family-owned restaurant chain

- Company type: Private
- Industry: Restaurants
- Genre: Churrascaria
- Founded: October 13, 1998; 27 years ago in Addison, Texas
- Headquarters: 2952 N Stemmons Fwy, Dallas, Texas, United States
- Number of locations: Over 50 U.S. + International
- Key people: Salim Asrawi (President)
- Website: www.texasdebrazil.com

Texas de Brazil is a family owned churrascaria (Brazilian steakhouse) restaurant chain with locations both internationally and domestically. It debuted October 13, 1998, in Addison, Texas, a suburb of Dallas. The restaurant is a Brazilian-American "churrascaria", or steakhouse that combines the cuisines of southern Brazil with Texan style meats. Customers turn a piece of paper green side up to get meat, or red side up to no longer receive meat.

== History ==
Texas de Brazil was founded by Salim Asrawi, who had immigrated from Lebanon during the civil war and settled in Texas. Asrawi had studied hospitality, working at hotels such as Ritz Carlton and used his savings to open the first Texas de Brazil.

== Menu ==
The meats at this restaurant consist of roasted and seasoned cuts of beef, pork, lamb, chicken and Brazilian sausage. The meats are cooked over an open flame grill, a technique which comes from southern Brazil, where employees dressed as gauchos bring meats individually to tables. Texas de Brazil does not serve chicken hearts, often considered a traditional food found at many other churrascarias. The restaurant also prepares and serves several types of desserts.

== See also ==
- List of barbecue restaurants
- List of Texas companies
- List of companies in Dallas
