= Rodízio =

All-you-can-eat style of restaurant service in Brazilian culture

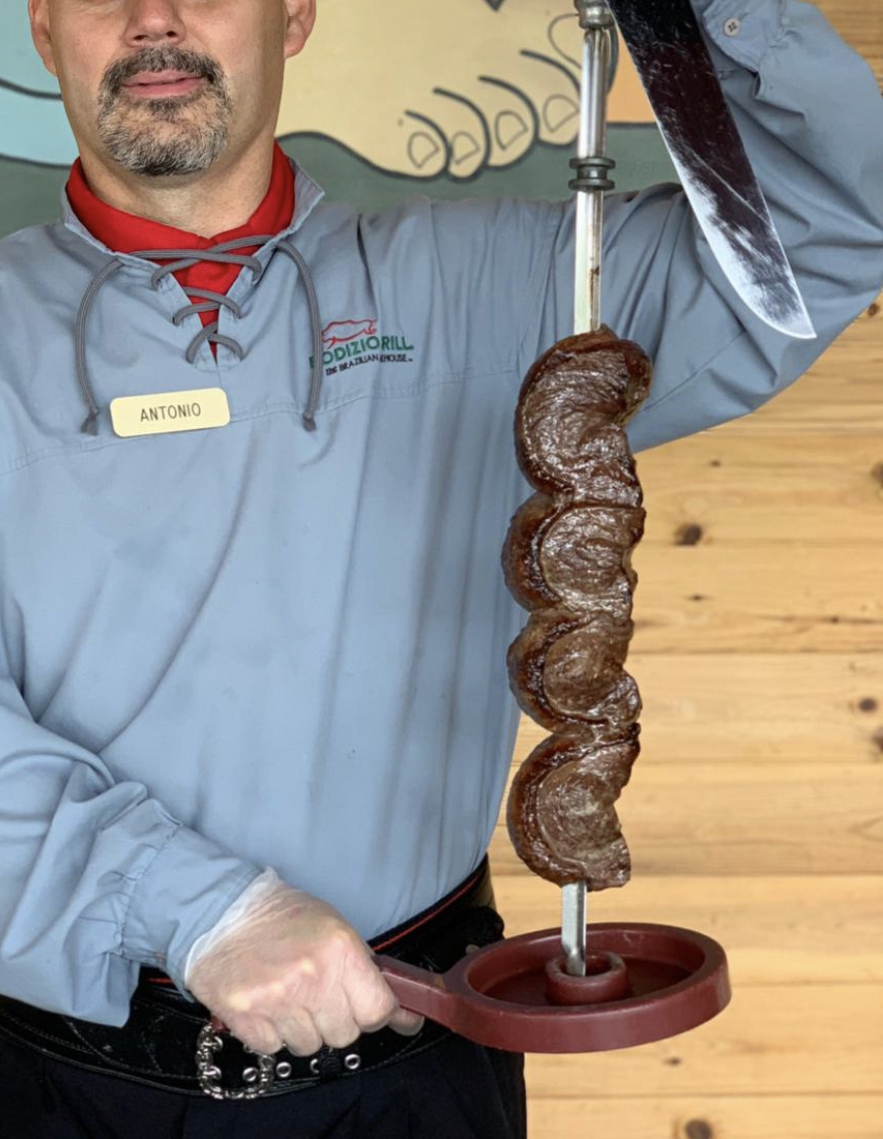
Rodízio meat is typically presented and served from a vertical skewer.

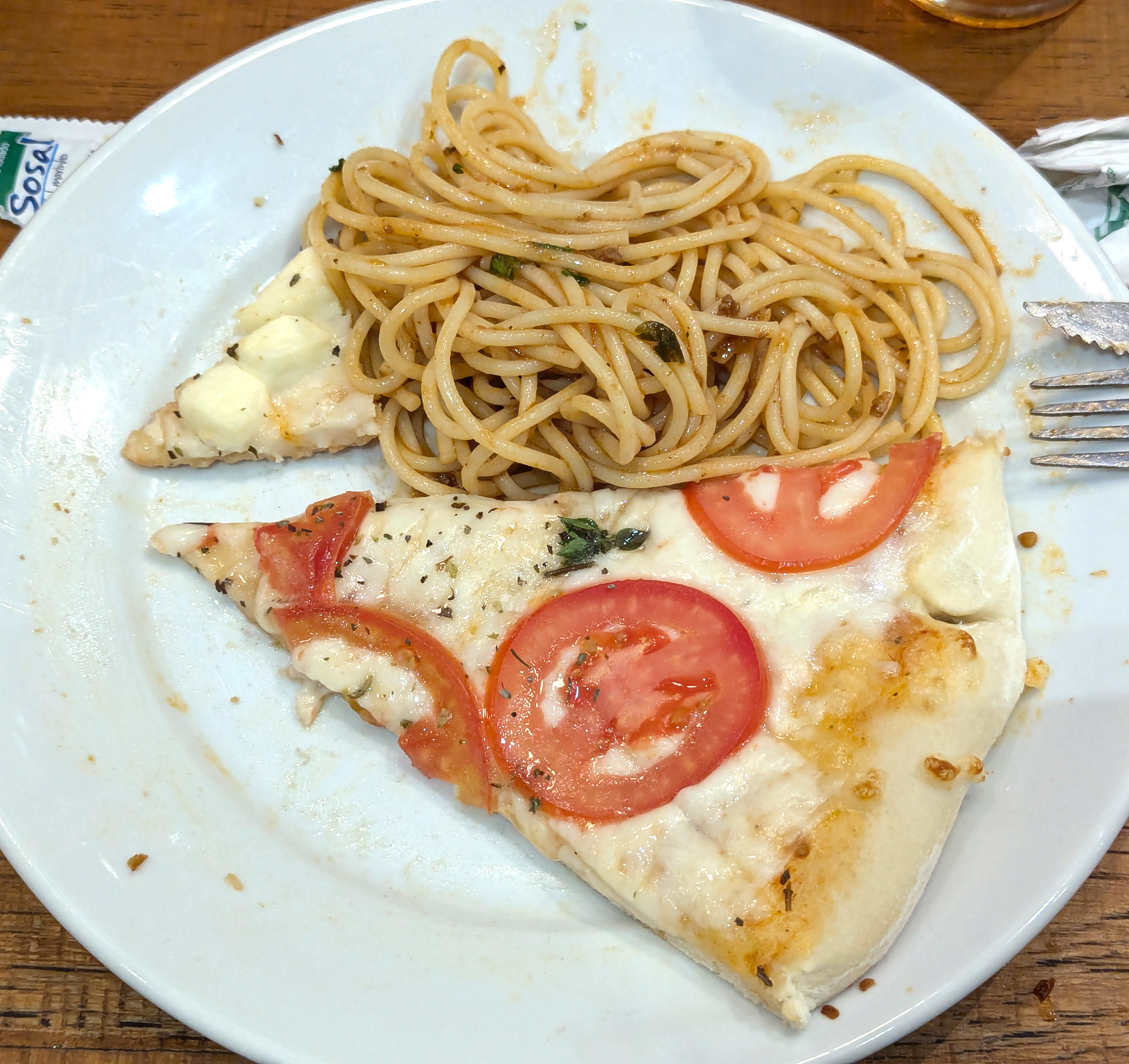
Plate at a pasta rodízio restaurant, a slice of pizza with a side of spaghetti

Rodízio (Brazilian Portuguese: [ʁoˈdʒiziu], lit. 'rotation') is an all-you-can-eat style of restaurant service in Brazilian restaurants where waiters bring a variety of foods repeatedly throughout the meal, until the customer signals that they have had enough. Traditionally, rodízio refers to a fare of grilled meats, but there are many other options – pizza, pasta, hamburgers and Asian cuisine are among some other offers by existing and popular rodízio-style restaurants.

== Description ==
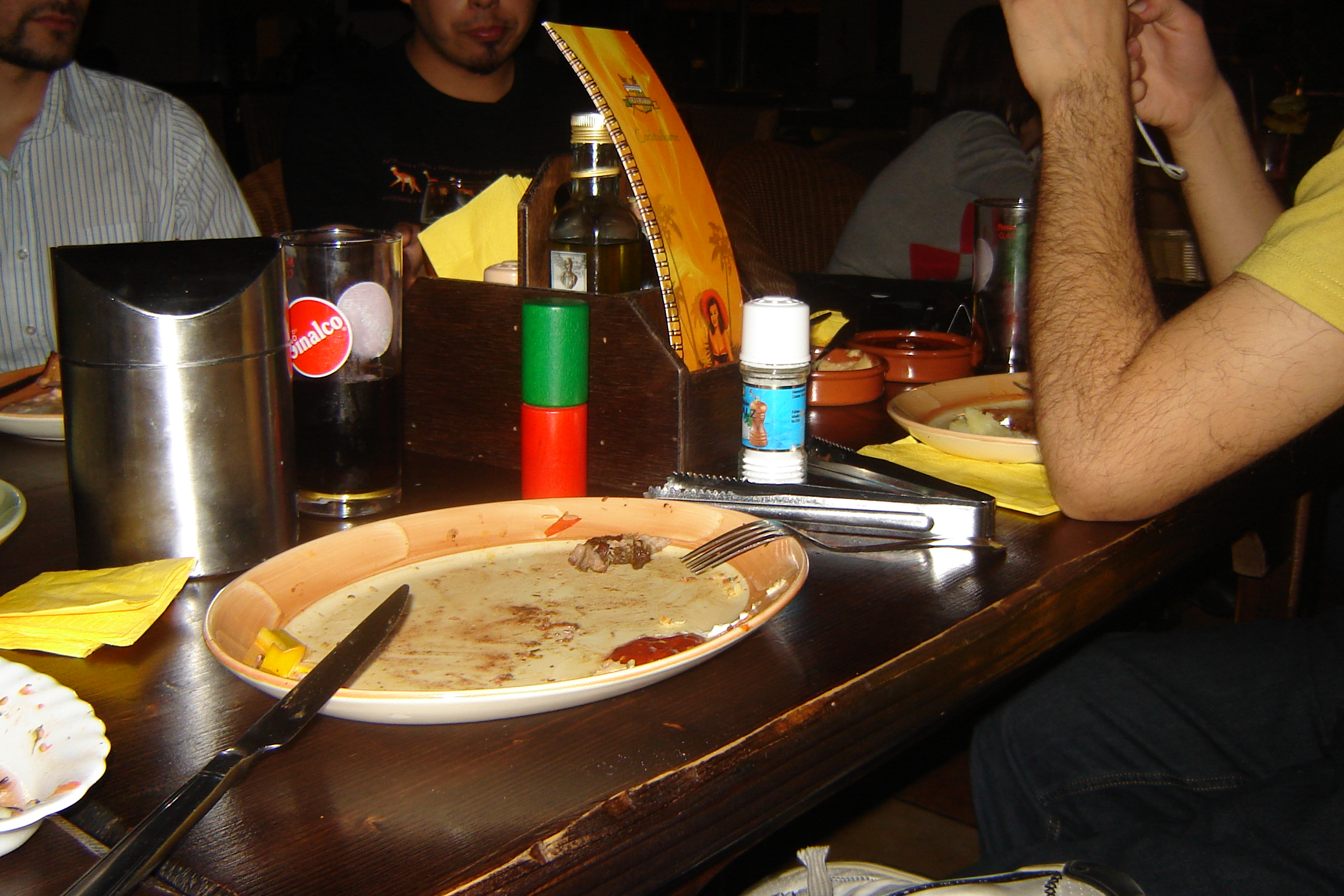
At this rodízio restaurant in Germany, patrons turn over green/red cylinders to indicate to staff whether they require more food.

Outside of Brazil, a rodízio restaurant may refer to a Brazilian-style steakhouse restaurant, where customers pay a fixed price (preço fixo).

In churrascarias or the traditional Brazilian-style steakhouse restaurants, servers come to the table with knives and a vertically-held skewer, on which are speared various cuts of meat, most commonly local cuts of beef, pork, chicken, lamb, and sometimes atypical or exotic meats. The exact origin of the rodízio style of service is unknown, but the traditional story is that this serving style was created when a waiter delivered a meat skewer to the wrong table by mistake but let the guest take a small piece of the meat anyway.

Rodízio became increasingly popular in Brazil in the mid-20th century and spread around the world as experienced servers moved to open their own restaurants. In Brazil, the rodízio style is sometimes also found in Italian (Italian restaurants serving pizza are especially common) or more recently Japanese restaurants. Rodízio of crepes are also common in Brazil, as also rodízios of other types of foods.

In a churrascaria, the rodízio courses are served right off the cooking spit and are sliced or plated right at the table. Thin slices are carved from the roasted outside layer of large cuts; the diners may use a pair of small stainless-steel tongs to grab the slices as they are cut, and then place them on their plate. Alternatively, the server will push smaller kebab-style chunks off the end of the skewer onto a serving plate.

Often, the meat servings are accompanied with fried potatoes, fried polenta, fried bananas, collard greens, black beans, rice, salads, or other side dishes (usually self-served buffet style).

In many restaurants, the diner is provided with a colored card or token. One colored side indicates to servers to bring more meat. The other side, with a different color, indicates that the diners have enough for the moment. This does not necessarily signal that the diners have finished eating, but only indicates that no more meat servings are desired at that moment.

== History ==
There are two competing versions of the origin of the rodízio:

One, supported by ACHUESP – the Association of Steakhouses in the State of São Paulo – claims it was created in at Churrascaria 477 in Jacupiranga, São Paulo, which was run by Albino Ongaratto. As the story goes, on a day in 1964, when the steakhouse was packed with pilgrims coming from the Senhor Bom Jesus de Iguape festival, a flustered waiter mixed up orders across several tables, creating quite a commotion. In response, Albino decided it would be best to serve all the skewers to all the tables. The idea was well received and quickly became a routine at the restaurant, delighting customers and eventually gaining worldwide recognition.

Another version says it originated in Churrascaria Mathias, in Sapiranga, Rio Grande do Sul, with a similar history also dating back to the 1960s.

== Fare ==
The following foods are often seen at a churrascaria served rodízio style:

- Filet mignon chunks wrapped in bacon
- Turkey chunks wrapped in bacon (these two are usually two-bite sized)
- Sirloin steak (cut semicircular and served in slices)
- Roast beef (served like sirloin steak)
- Rump cover (called picanha in Portuguese)
- Flap steak (called fraldinha in Portuguese)
- Beef short ribs
- Lamb
- Pork ribs
- Chouriço or some other spicy Iberian pork sausage
- Chicken hearts
- Grilled dark-meat chicken
- Grilled pineapple or banana (meant as a palate cleanser between courses)
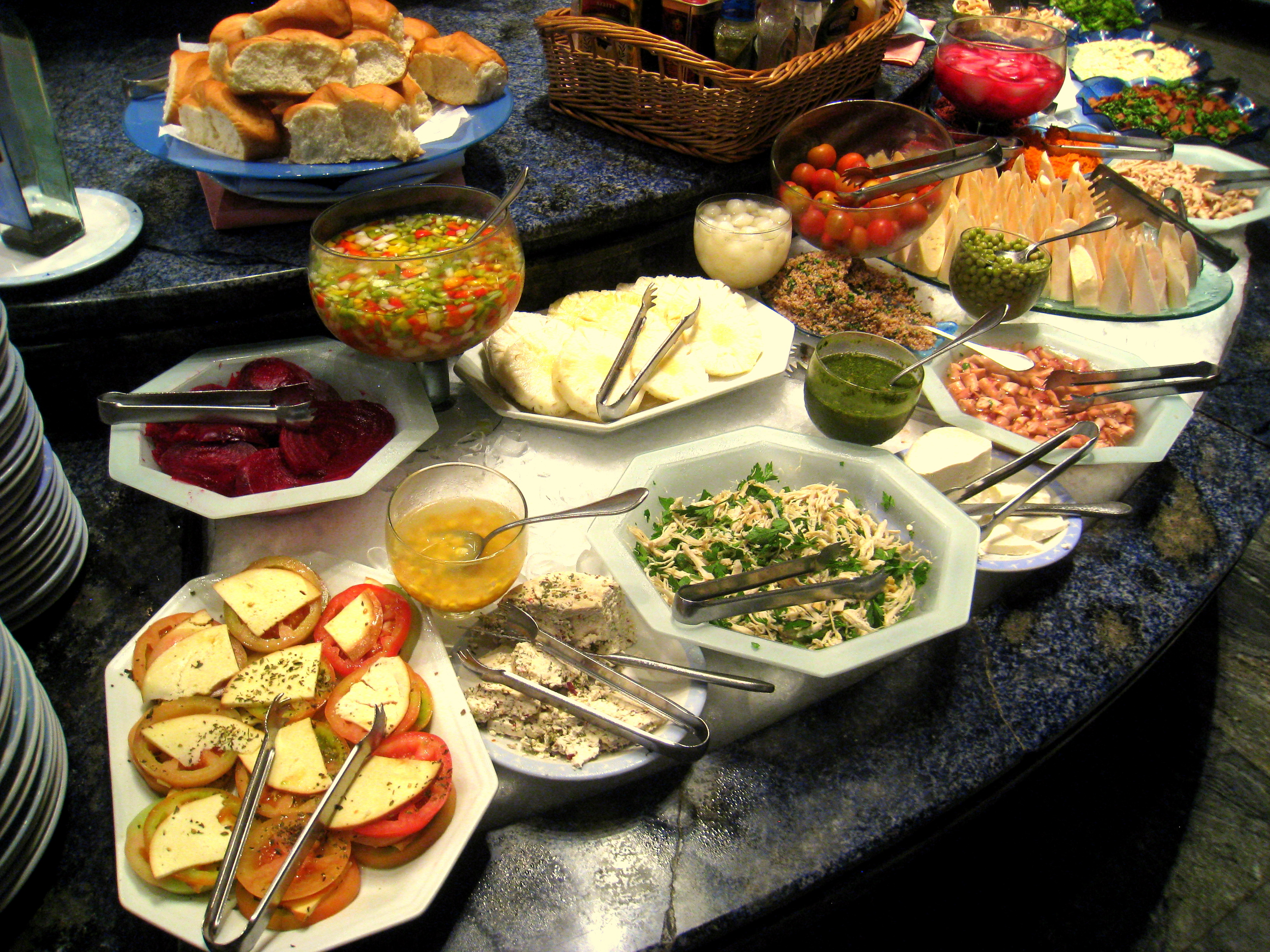
A rodízio side dish buffet selection

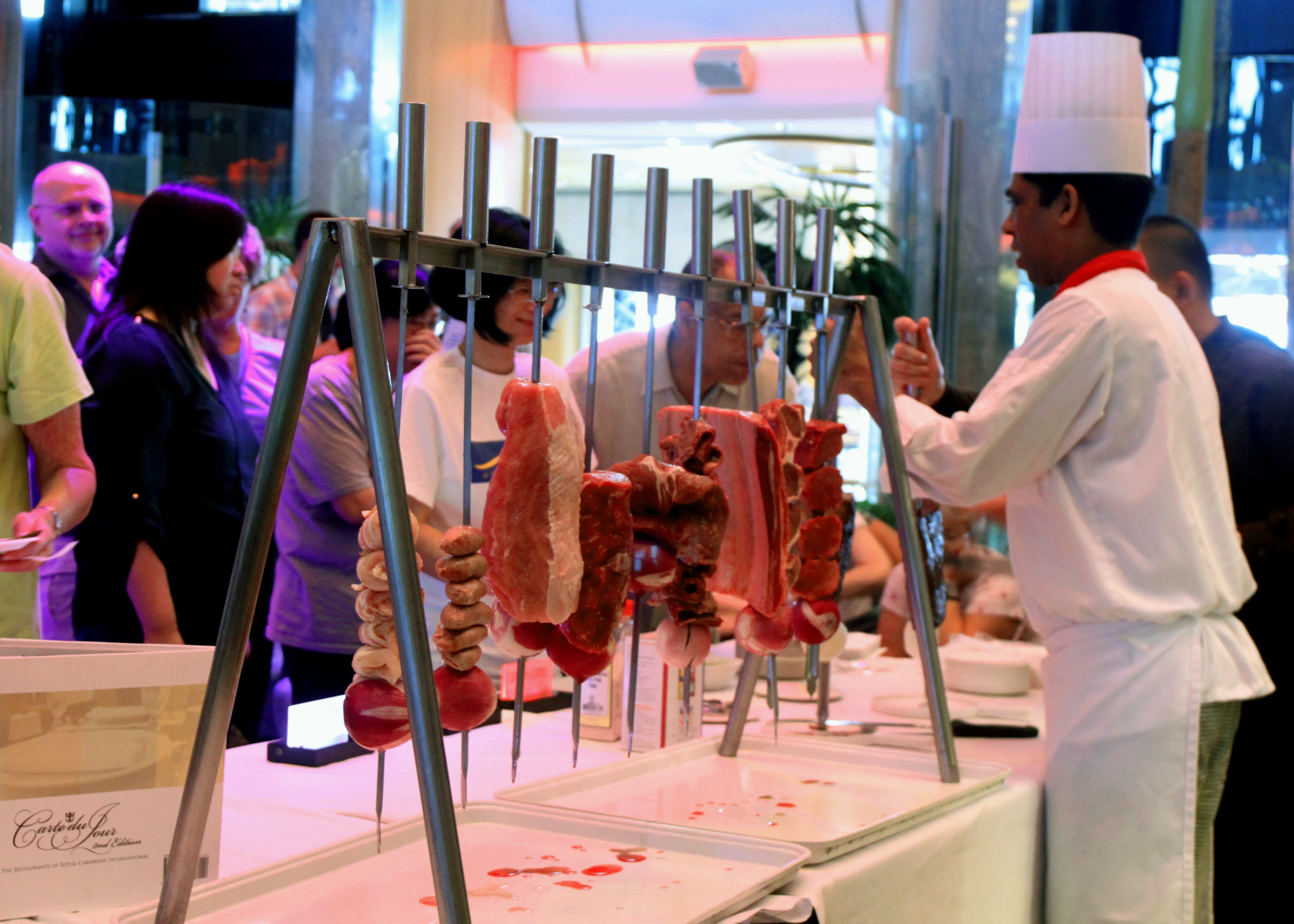
Assortment of raw meats being set up for churrascaria grilling

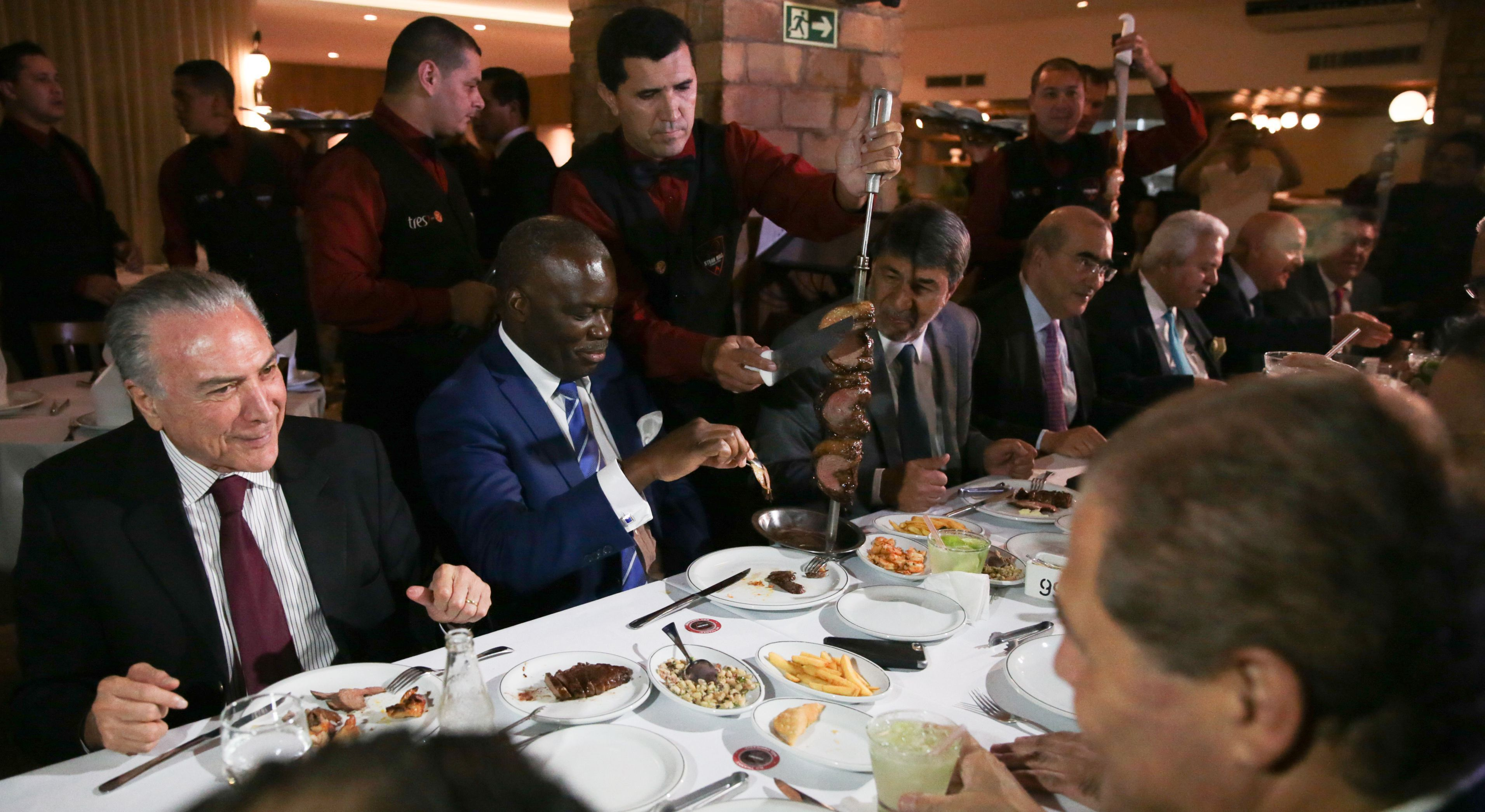
Brazilian politicians being served rodízio style

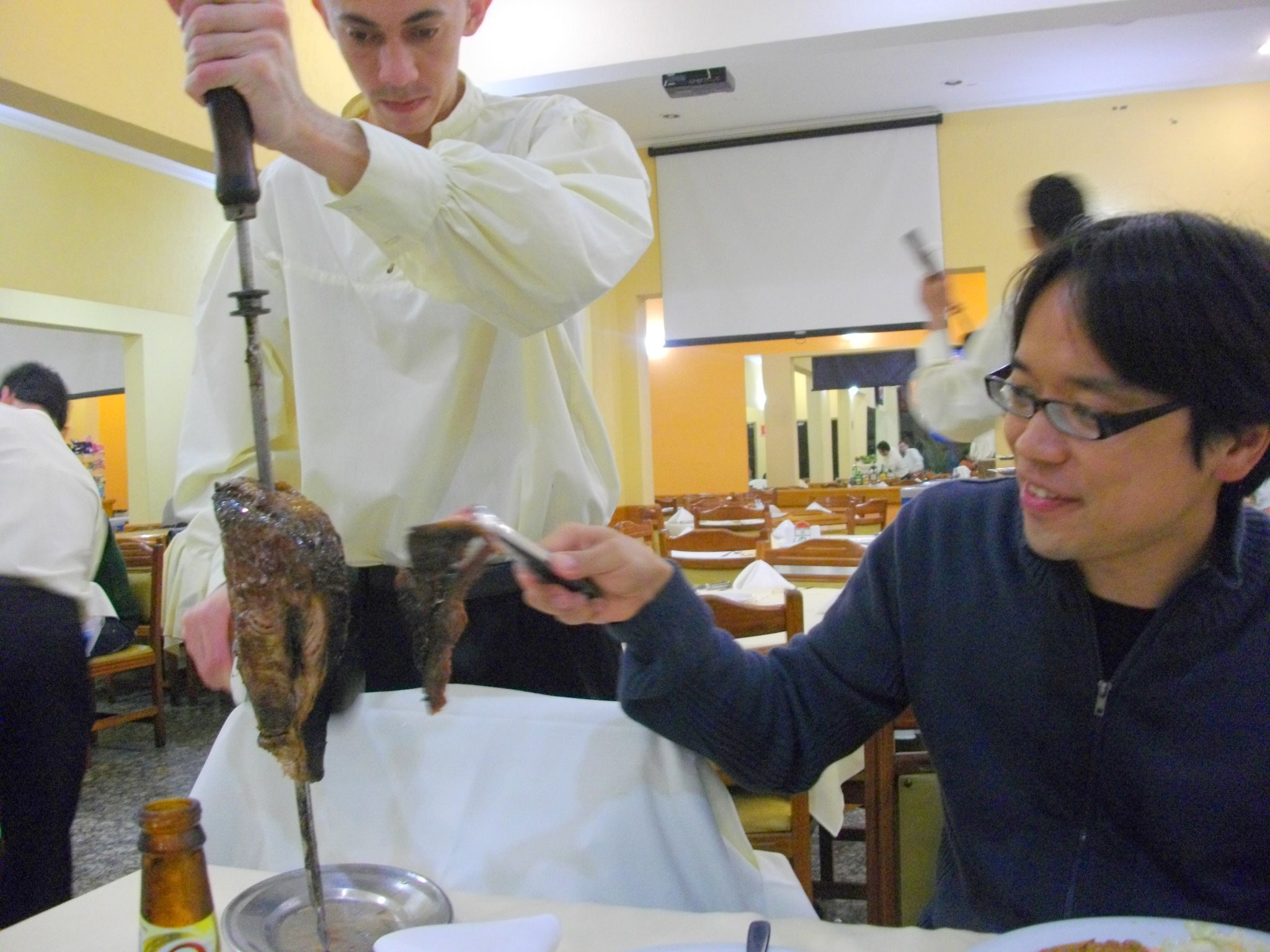
Waiter serves rodízio style in Japan.

== See also ==
- Brazilian cuisine
- Culinary art
