= Churrascaria =

Type of Brazilian restaurant

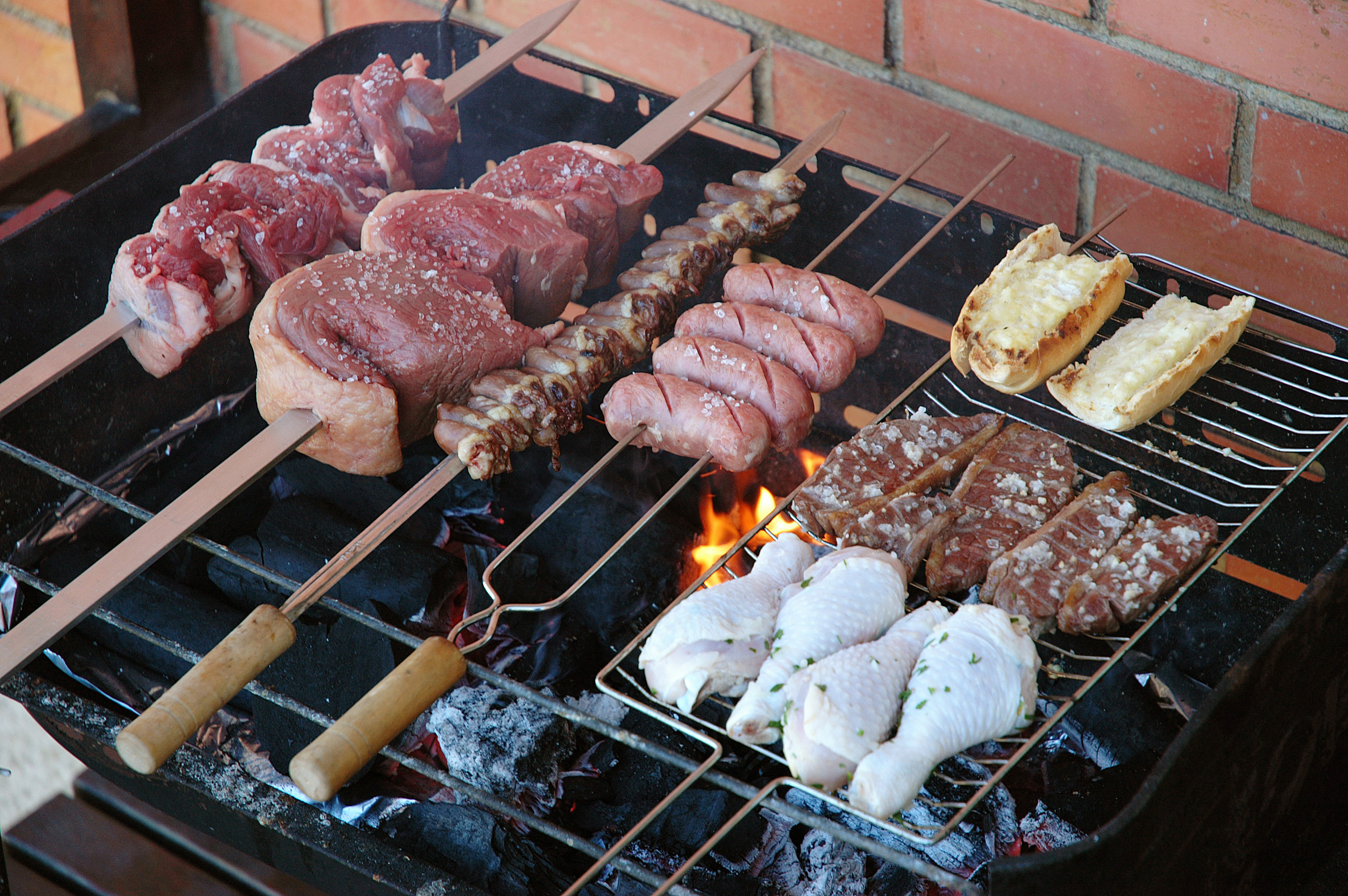
Churrasco barbecue cooking on a churrasqueira grill

A churrascaria (Portuguese: [ʃuʁɐskɐˈɾi.ɐ]) is a restaurant where meat is cooked in churrasco style, which translates roughly from the Portuguese word for "barbecue".

Churrascaria cuisine is typically (but not always) served rodízio style, where roving waiters serve the barbecued meats from large skewers directly onto the seated diners' plates.

== Terminology ==
Related terminology comes from the Portuguese language. A churrasqueiro is somebody who cooks churrasco style food in a churrascaria restaurant or at home. A churrasqueira is a barbecue grill used for this style of cooking.

== History ==
Distinctly a South American style rotisserie, it owes its origins to the fireside roasts of the gaúchos of southern Brazil, Argentina, and Uruguay, traditionally from the Pampa region, centuries ago.

== Contemporary churrascarias ==
In modern restaurants rodízio service is typically offered. Garçons (waiters) sometimes dressed as gaúchos come to the table with knives and a skewer, on which are speared various kinds of meat, be it beef, pork, filet mignon, lamb, chicken, duck, ham (with pineapple), sausage, fish, or any other sort of local cut of meat. A common cut of beef top sirloin cap is known as picanha. In addition to the table service, a self-service buffet of salad, bread, rice, and farofa is offered.

=== Brazil ===
In most parts of Brazil, the churrasco is roasted over charcoal. In the south of Brazil, however, mostly close to the borders of Argentina and Uruguay, embers of wood are also used.

=== Portugal ===
Throughout Portugal there are various churrasqueira grills located in towns, cities, and also by the roadside on national highways. While churrasqueira restaurants offer the typical fare of barbecued frango (chicken), beef or pork, they may also offer rotisserie chicken and a variety of other culinary dishes.

=== United States ===
A churrascaria outlet in Los Angeles, California

Churrascaria cuisine combined with rodízio-style service has become more popular in the US, expanding to a number of cities.

== See also ==
- Culinary arts
