= List of restaurants in the Las Vegas Valley =

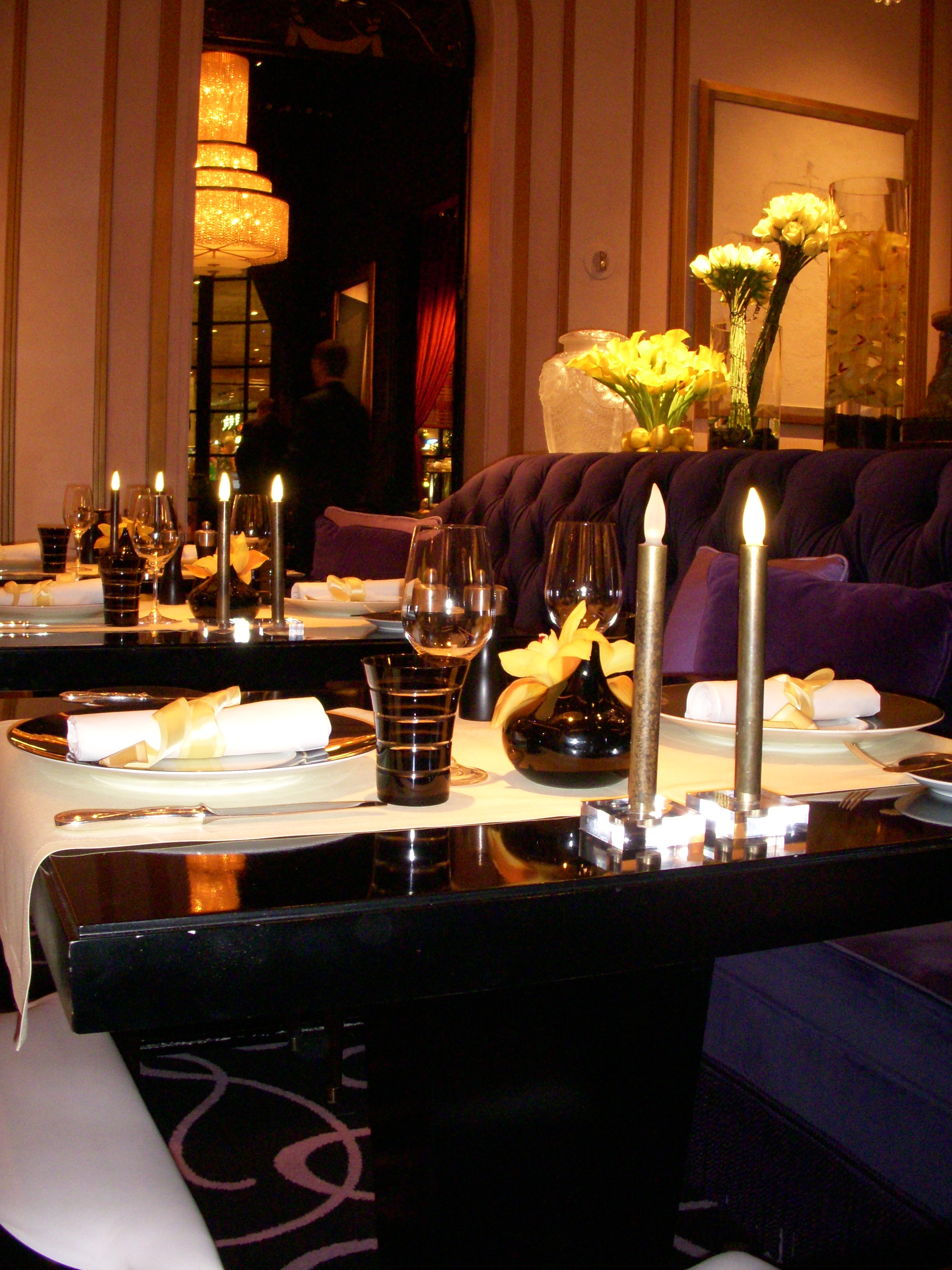
The dining room at Joël Robuchon located at MGM Grand

This is an incomplete list of notable restaurants in the Las Vegas Valley. The Las Vegas Valley is a major metropolitan area located in the southern part of Nevada. The largest urban agglomeration in the state, it is the heart of the Las Vegas–Paradise-Henderson, NV MSA. A number of restaurants in Las Vegas are in casinos or hotels.

== Restaurants in the Las Vegas Valley ==
- The Black Sheep, a Vietnamese-American restaurant opened in 2017.
- Bob Taylor's Ranch House, located in the Centennial Hills neighborhood. The restaurant features a rustic theme with western film memorabilia. It specializes in steak, and is among the oldest restaurants in Las Vegas. It was originally built in 1954, as the residence of Bob Taylor (1922–2010) and his wife, with a shooting range in the rear accompanied by a pro shop serving food. It was later converted into a restaurant, and Taylor owned it until the 1980s. The restaurant gained prominence after making an appearance in the 1964 film Viva Las Vegas. It also became popular among celebrities due to its secluded location; originally surrounded by desert land, the area began to see urban development in the 1990s.
- Capriotti's, a national chain of sandwich shops headquartered in Las Vegas.
- Farm Basket, a local chain focused on fried chicken and turkey. Farm Basket opened in 1981, taking over the former locations of Picnic 'N Chicken, a San Diego chain.
- Golden Steer, a steakhouse on Sahara Avenue near the Las Vegas Strip. It opened in 1962, and has since been popular among celebrities, including the Rat Pack. It was expanded in 1978 and again in 2023.
- The Hush Puppy, a southern restaurant that opened on Charleston Boulevard in 1975, followed by another location on Nellis Boulevard in 1986. Both were started by the Ghormley family, who relocated from Arkansas. The second location had closed by 2023, when the family sold the business. The original restaurant continues to operate, and a new location is expected to open at downtown's Neonopolis mall in 2025.

== Downtown Las Vegas ==
- Evel Pie (2016)
- Pizza Rock

=== At Binion's ===
- Benny's Smokin' BBQ & Brews
- Binion's Café
- Binion's Deli
- Top of Binion's Steakhouse
- Whiskey Licker Up

=== At Circa ===
- 8 East
- Barry's Downtown Prime
- Saginaw's Delicatessen
- Victory Burger

=== At The D ===
- Andiamo Steakhouse
- Bacon Nation

=== At Golden Nugget ===
- Chart House
- Saltgrass Steak House
- Vic & Anthony's Steakhouse

=== At Four Queens ===
- Hugo's Cellar

=== At Plaza ===
- Five Guys (Opening late 2026)
- Hash House a go go
- Oscar's Steakhouse
- Pop Up Pizza
- Pink Box Donuts
- Subway

== Henderson ==
- 138 Degrees

=== At M Resort ===
- Anthony's Prime Steak & Seafood
- Baby Cakes
- Jayde 16
- Marinelli's
- Raiders Tavern & Grill
- Vig Deli

=== At Sunset Station ===
- The Brass Fork
- The Oyster Bar
- Pasta Cucina
- Sonoma Cellar
- Yard House

== Las Vegas Strip ==
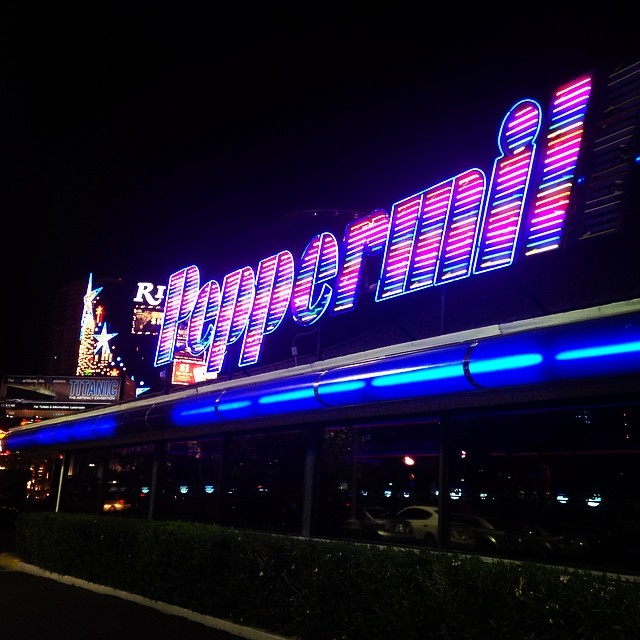
Peppermill exterior, 2014

- The Peppermill is a standalone restaurant, not located within any resort or mall. It opened on December 26, 1972, along the northern Las Vegas Strip. The Peppermill is popular among celebrities, and has made various appearances in popular culture.

=== At Aria Resort and Casino ===
- Bardot Brasserie (2015)
- Blossom
- Carbone
- Catch
- Din Tai Fung (2020)
- Gymkhana
- Javier's (2012)
- Jean-Georges Steakhouse
- Lemongrass

=== At Bellagio ===
- Carbone Riviera
- Jasmine
- LAGO by Julian Serrano
- Mayfair Supper Club
- Michael Mina
- PRIME Steakhouse
- Spago
- Yellowtail Japanese Restaurant & Lounge

=== At BLVD ===
- How Ya Dough'n
- In-N-Out Burger
- Pepper Lunch (Opening 2026)

=== At Caesars Palace ===
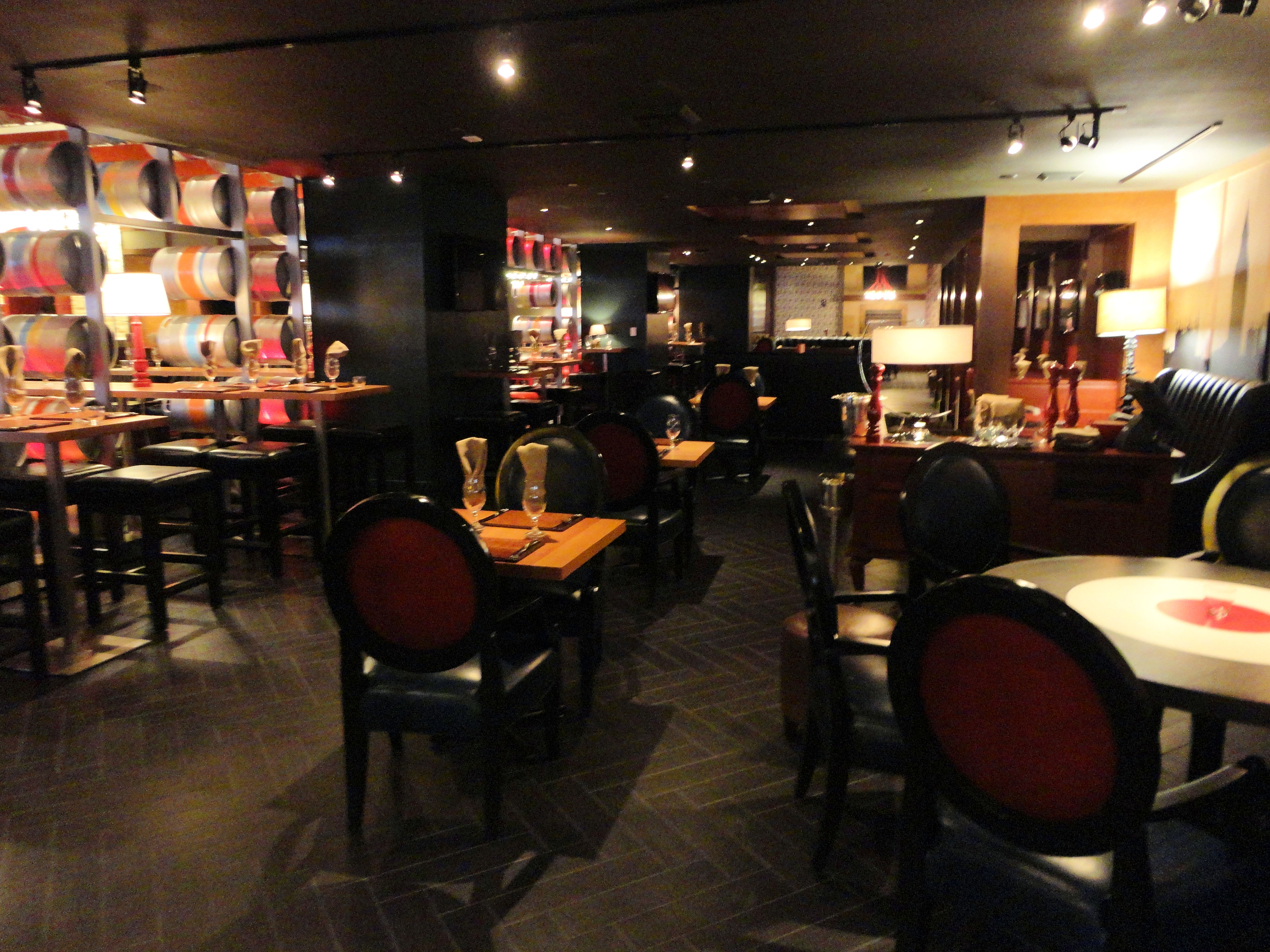
The Gordon Ramsay Pub & Grill at Caesars Palace

- Amalfi
- Bacchanal Buffet
- Beijing Noodle No. 9
- Brasserie B Parisian Steakhouse by Bobby Flay
- Gordon Ramsay Hell's Kitchen
- Gordon Ramsay Pub & Grill
- Nobu Restaurant Las Vegas
- Peter Luger Steak House
- Restaurant Guy Savoy
- Pronto by Giada
- Stanton Social Italian

==== At The Forum Shops at Caesars Palace ====
- Carmine's
- The Cheesecake Factory
- Joe's Seafood, Prime Steak & Stone Crab
- R&G Lounge (Opening late 2026)
- RPM Italian
- Sushi Roku
- The Palm Las Vegas
- True Food Kitchen
- Water Grill (2019)
- Zaytinya

=== At CityCenter ===
==== At 63 ====
- Jason Aldean's Kitchen + Bar
- Ocean Prime

==== At The Shops at Crystals ====
- Bazaar Mar by José Andrés
- Mastro's Ocean Club
- Toca Madera

=== At Cosmopolitan of Las Vegas ===
- Amaya
- China Poblano
- The Corner Store
- é by José Andrés
- eggslut
- Jaleo
- Milk Bar
- Momofuku
- Red Plate
- Scarpetta
- STK
- Superfrico
- zuma

=== At Excalibur ===
- Baja Fresh
- Buca di Beppo
- Johnny Rockets
- Krispy Kreme
- Orange Julius / Dairy Queen

=== At Fashion Show Las Vegas ===
- Benihana
- California Pizza Kitchen
- Chipotle Mexican Grill
- Dunkin' Donuts
- Earl of Sandwich
- Johnny Rockets
- Luke's Lobster
- Panda Express
- Popeyes
- Sbarro
- The Capital Grille
- The Habit
- Yogurtland

=== At Flamingo Las Vegas ===
- Bugsy & Meyer's Steakhouse
- Category 10
- Pinky's by Vanderpump
- Gordon Ramsay Burger
- Havana 1957
- Johnny Rockets
- Nathan's Famous

=== At Fontainebleau Las Vegas ===
- Capon's Burgers
- Cantina Contramar
- Chyna Club
- Don's Prime
- La Fontaine
- ITO
- Komodo
- KYU Las Vegas
- Mother Wolf
- Papi Steak

=== At Harmon Corner ===
- Bojangles
- Bubba Gump Shrimp Company
- McDonald's
- Panda Express
- Rainforest Cafe
- Sbarro
- Subway

=== At Harrah's Las Vegas ===
- Bobby's Burgers by Bobby Flay
- Pizza Cake by Buddy Valastro
- Ramsay's Kitchen by Gordon Ramsay
- Ruth's Chris Steak House Las Vegas

=== At Horseshoe Las Vegas ===
- Jack Binion's Steak
- Guy Fieri's Flavortown Sports Kitchen
- Johnny Rockets
- Nathan's Famous
- Nosh Deli
- Bottle Blonde
- Ole Red
- Sbarro
- Subway

=== At Linq ===
- The Boss Cafe by Buddy Valastro
- Buddy's Jersey Eats by Buddy Valastro
- Gordon Ramsay Fish & Chips
- Guy Fieri's Vegas Kitchen & Bar
- Hash House a go go

==== At Linq Promenade ====
- Bojangles
- In-N-Out Burger
- Tilted Kilt Pub & Eatery
- Yard House

=== At Luxor Las Vegas ===
- Backstage Deli
- Blizz
- Public House
- Pyramid Café
- TENDER steakhouse + lounge

=== At Mandalay Bay & W Las Vegas ===
- Border Grill
- Bourbon Steak
- Caramá
- House of Blues Restaurant & Bar
- Orla
- StripSteak
- Wahlburgers

=== At MGM Grand Las Vegas ===
- Emeril's New Orleans Fish House
- Four Sixes Ranch Steakhouse (Opening 2027)
- Hakkasan Restaurant
- Joël Robuchon
- L'Atelier de Joël Robuchon
- Morimoto Las Vegas
- Tom Colicchio's Craftsteak
- Wolfgang Puck Bar & Grill

=== At New York-New York ===
- Gallagher's Steakhouse
- Il Fornaio
- Nathan's Famous
- Shake Shack

=== At Paris ===
- The Bedford by Martha Stewart
- Bobby's Burgers by Bobby Flay
- Eiffel Tower Restaurant
- Gordon Ramsay Steak
- Mon Ami Gabi (2017)
- Nobu Paris
- Vanderpump à Paris

=== At Park MGM ===
- Bavette's Steakhouse & Bar
- Best Friend
- Eataly
- The Library

=== At Planet Hollywood Las Vegas ===
- Gordon Ramsay Burger Las Vegas
- P. F. Chang's
- Strip House Steakhouse

=== At Resorts World ===
- AQUA
- Bar Zazu
- Brezza
- Carversteak
- Copper Sun
- Crossroads Kitchen
- FUHU
- Genting Palace
- Stubborn Seed
- ¡VIVA!

=== At Sahara Las Vegas ===
- Balla Italian Soul
- Maroon Steakhouse
- Uno Más Street Tacos + Spirits
- The Noodle Den
- Zeffer's Cafe

=== At Showcase Mall ===
- BrewDog
- Denny's
- Five Guys
- Hard Rock Cafe
- Olive Garden
- Outback Steakhouse
- Raising Cane's

=== At Treasure Island ===
- Gilley's Saloon (1999)
- Wahlburgers (Opening 2026)

=== At Trump International Hotel Las Vegas ===
- DJT

=== At The Vanderpump ===
- Giada
- Starbucks

=== At the Venetian & Palazzo ===
- Bazaar Meat by José Andrés
- Black Tap Craft Burgers & Beer
- Bouchon Bistro
- CHICA
- COTE Korean Steakhouse
- CUT by Wolfgang Puck
- Delmonico Steakhouse
- estiatorio Milos
- Grand Lux Cafe
- Gjelina Las Vegas
- HaSalon
- Miznon
- Mott 32
- Scarr's Pizza
- WAKUDA
- Yardbird Southern Table & Bar

==== At Grand Canal Shoppes ====
- BOA Steakhouse
- BRERA osteria
- Buddy V's Ristorante
- Canaletto Ristorante Veneto
- Carlo's Bakery
- Five Guys
- Fogo de Chão
- Grimaldi's Pizzeria
- Smith & Wollensky
- SUSHISAMBA
- The X Pot

=== At Wynn & Encore ===
- Casa Playa
- Cipriani
- Delilah
- Mizumi
- PISCES
- Sartiano's Italian Steakhouse
- Sinatra
- SW Steakhouse
- Wing Lei

== Resort corridor ==
=== At Oyo ===
- Steak 'n Shake

=== At Palms ===
- Scotch 80 Prime
- Vetri Cucina
- Tim Ho Wan
- A.Y.C.E Buffet

=== At Rio ===
- eggslut
- High Steaks
- Smashburger
- Tony Luke's

=== At The STRAT ===
- Chi Asian Kitchen
- Nunzio's Pizzeria
- Top of the World
- Strat Café
- 108 Eat
- McCall's Heartland Grill

=== At Westgate ===
- Silk Road Asian Bistro
- Benihana
- Rikki Tiki Sushi
- Freso Italiano
- Edge Steakhouse

== Spring Valley ==
- The Hat

=== At Durango ===
- Mijo
- Nicco's Prime Cuts & Fresh Fish
- Summer House
- The George

== Summerlin ==
=== At Red Rock ===
- 8 Noodle Bar
- Blue Ribbon Sushi Bar & Grill
- Lucille's Smokehouse
- Lucky Penny
- Naxos Taverna
- Osteria Fiorella
- T-Bones Chophouse
- Yard House

== Defunct restaurants ==
- Alex (1998–2011)
- Aureole (Closed 2023)
- Cathedrale Las Vegas (Closed 2025)
- CRUSH American Grill
- El Sombrero (1950–2014) was the oldest Mexican restaurant in Las Vegas, located at 807 South Main Street in downtown.
- Fleur de Lys (−2010)
- The Green Shack (1929–1999)
- Heart Attack Grill (2005-2026)
- Julian Serrano Tapas (2010–2025)
- KOI (closed 2024)
- Le Cirque (Closed Aug 2026)
- Lupo by Wolfgang Puck (closed 2023)
- Margaritaville Las Vegas
- Lakeside
- Lutèce (1999–)
- Mr Chow(closed 2025)
- N9NE Steakhouse
- M.Y. Asia
- Old Homestead Steakhouse (2011–2023)
- Picasso (1998–2024)
- Rivea (Closed Jun 2025)
- Red Square (1999–2019)
- Retro by Voltaggio
- Robert Irvine's Public House. Closed in 2024 when the Tropicana closed.
- Rumjungle (−2010)
- Safta 1964 by Alon Shaya
- The Vineyard
- Venetian Ristorante (1955–2003), an Italian restaurant which also offered a variety of wines. It was unaffiliated with the Venetian resort on the Strip. Originally opened as a pizzeria on Fremont Street, it relocated to West Sahara Avenue in 1966 and later took on the "Ristorante" name. It was popular among celebrities. It was owned by the Ruvo family until the 1990s, and business eventually suffered under the new ownership.
- Rao's (2006–2021)
- Toby Keith's I Love This Bar & Grill (2005–2020)
- Villa Azur (Closed 2025)

== See also ==
- List of Michelin-starred restaurants in the American Southwest
- Lists of restaurants
