= Julian Serrano Tapas =

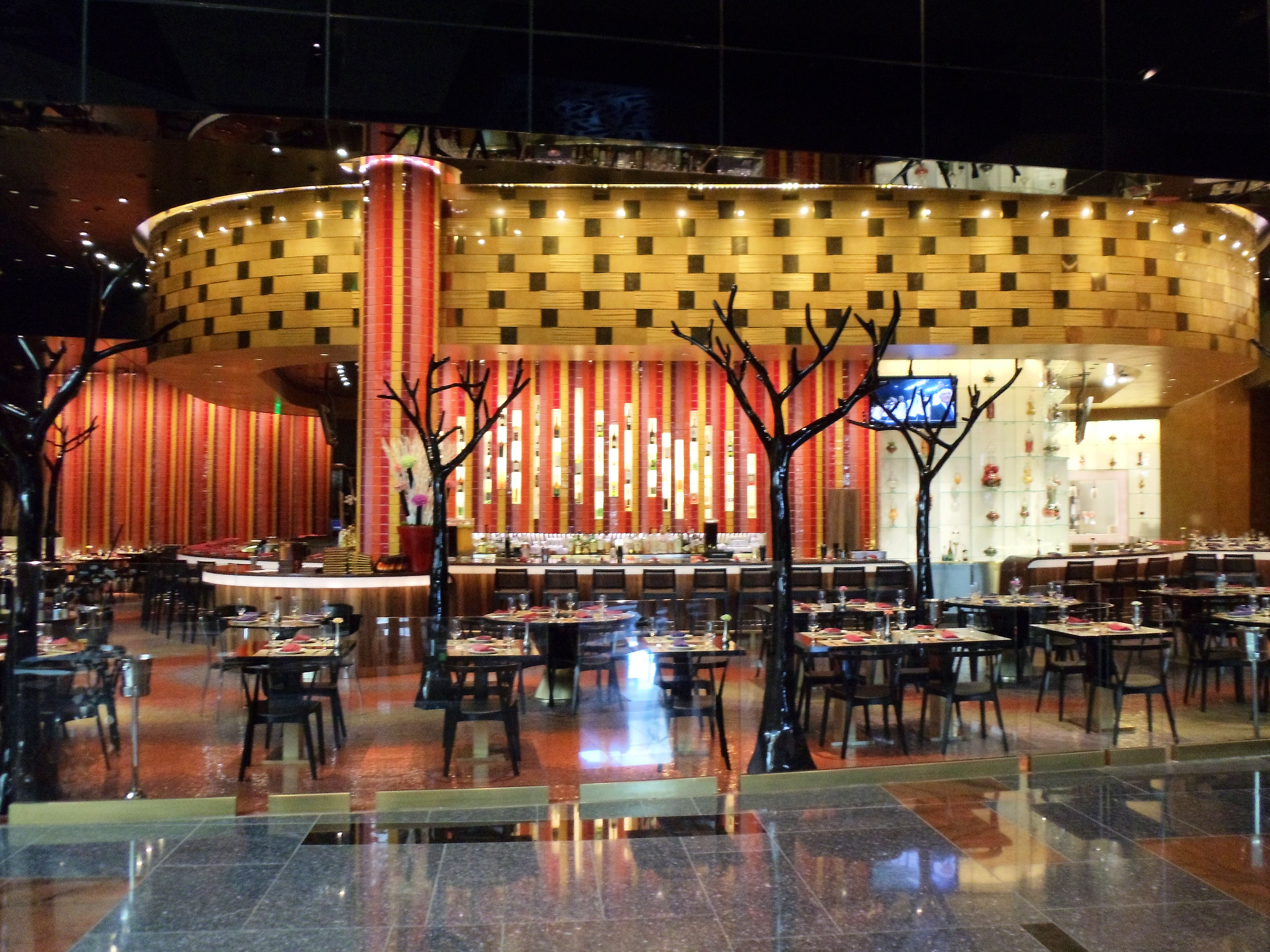
- Interactive map of Julian Serrano Tapas

Restaurant information
- Established: 2010
- Closed: February 1, 2025
- Owner: Julian Serrano
- Food type: Tapas
- Dress code: Casual
- Rating: Zagat - 4.5
- Location: 3730 South Las Vegas Boulevard, Las Vegas, Clark County, Nevada, Nevada, 89109, United States
- Coordinates: 36°6′29.99″N 115°10′32.7″W
- Seating capacity: 217
- Reservations: Yes
- Website: aria.com/en/restaurants/julian-serrano.html

Julian Serrano Tapas was a tapas restaurant in Las Vegas, Nevada in the United States. Owned by Julian Serrano, it was located inside the Aria Resort and Casino and was Serrano's second restaurant in Las Vegas after Picasso.

Julian Serrano Tapas closed in February 2025. Construction permits for the space have been issued to a new restaurant named Gymkhana.

== History ==
Julian Serrano wanted to open a Spanish-style restaurant for over a decade. In 2009, MGM Resorts International offered Serrano a contract to open a restaurant at the new Aria Resort and Casino. Serrano agreed to the restaurant contract as long as he could have a tapas restaurant. Serrano traveled to Spain to find a designer for the restaurant. The design firm Gente de Valor was selected. Serrano traveled to DC to meet chef Jose Lopez Picazo, a fellow chef from Madrid. Lopez Picazo was hired as chef.

The restaurant's first menu tasting took place before the kitchen was operational. Executives from MGM and Serrano tasted between 25 and 30 dishes in 40 minutes. The restaurant opened a few weeks later to 600 guests on the first day.

== Design and ambiance ==
The restaurant was located in the lobby of the Aria Resort and Casino. Designed by Gente de Valor and Serrano, the restaurant represented "the vibrant culture of my country" and needed "a good sense of balance" according to Serrano.

== Cuisine and beverages ==
The restaurant served contemporary versions of Spanish-style tapas with occasional Asian fusion influences. Dishes included paella (including a vegan option); ahi tuna tempura with seaweed salad and avocado-rocoto-mayo and ponzu sauce; marinated olives; stuffed piquillo peppers; grilled calamari; ribs made from Black Iberian pigs; salmon with truffle bechamel sauce and mushrooms; squid-ink rice with chicken and saffron, lobster with roasted red peppers; and empanadas.

The dessert menu included torrija with salted caramel and vanilla ice cream.

The bar offered multiple types of sangria. Cocktails included the Piña Smash, pineapple purée, simple syrup, mint and lime. The bar also served carajillo, a Spanish after-dinner drink made with xtabentún. The wine list comprised mainly Spanish wines.

== Reception ==
Zagat rated Julian Serrano Tapas as having a 4.5 out of 5 for food and 4.4 out of 5 for decor and service. Time Out gave the restaurant 4 out of 5 stars.

== See also ==
- List of restaurants in the Las Vegas Valley
