= Arnie Morton =

American restaurateur

- Born: Arnold Jerome Cohen; March 23, 1922; Chicago, Illinois
- Died: May 28, 2005 (aged 83); Deerfield, Illinois
- Occupation: Businessman
- Known for: Founder of Morton's Restaurant Group
- Spouse(s): Adleen June Savin (divorced); Zorine Morton
- Children: 7, including Peter and Michael
- Family: Harry Morton (grandson)

Arnold Jerome Morton (March 23, 1922 – May 28, 2005) was a restaurateur who founded Morton's Restaurant Group/Morton's Steakhouse.

== Early life ==
Arnold Jerome Cohen was born in Chicago, the son of Morton Cohen Morton and Isabelle Cohen Morton. He was of Jewish descent. He grew up in the Hyde Park neighborhood on the city's South Side, where his father owned two restaurants. He had two brothers, Edward and Robert. From the age of 15, Morton bused tables, worked in the kitchen, and performed a wide array of odd jobs in the family business. He graduated from Hyde Park High School and enlisted in the United States Army during World War II where he saw eight months of action after arriving in Normandy, France immediately after D-Day. After the war, he attended the University of Alabama where he played football for two years.

== Career ==
Arnie Morton opened his first restaurant, the Walton Walk, between Rush Street and Michigan Avenue in the 1950s. This paved the way for a partnership with Victor Lownes and Hugh Hefner, launching the Playboy Club in 1960. Morton was the right-hand man of Hugh Hefner when he launched the Playboy Empire on February 29, 1960. He served as Executive Vice President of Playboy Enterprises, where he developed the worldwide chain of Playboy Clubs. He went out on his own again after ten years, partnering with Klaus Fritsch, the food and beverage director of the Playboy Clubs.

Arnie Morton's parents had run a restaurant in Hyde Park, called Morton's, which for 23 years had been located at 5487 Lake Park Avenue. In 1958, his parents having died, Morton relocated the restaurant to the newly-opened Shore Drive Motel, at 56th and South Shore Drive. The menu was sophisticated for the era, featuring filet mignon, roast duck, lamb shish kebab flambe, and Caesar salad. In 1978, Morton closed the Hyde Park location to open the first Morton's Steakhouse (see below).

In the 1970s, he and Klitsch opened several successful ventures in Chicago's Newberry Plaza including Arnie's on Chicago's Gold Coast; the seafood restaurant LaMer; and the disco/night club Zorrine's (named after Morton's wife). In 1978, Morton's of Chicago opened in the basement of Newberry Plaza in Chicago adjacent to the existing Arnie's restaurant. The menu consisted simply of giant potatoes and large steaks. It was slow at the beginning, but gained a boost when Frank Sinatra arrived at the restaurant and became a regular.

In 1987, Morton sold Morton's Steakhouses, then with $15 million in sales and nine restaurants throughout the United States, for $12.4 million to the venture capital firm Quantum Restaurant Group, Inc. in partnership with the Baltimore brokerage house Alex. Brown & Sons with Fritsch staying on as president.

Morton's eventually grew into a chain of Morton's of 70 locations in the United States, Hongkong, China, Singapore, Macau, Mexico, and Canada. In 2011, Landry's bought 77 Morton Restaurants for $116.6 Million.

== Taste of Chicago ==
Morton is credited as the inspiration behind the "Taste of Chicago", one of the city's best-loved summer festivals. He got the idea when he went to a similar event in New York in the late 1970s. Thinking that Chicago could do much better, he lined up restaurants to participate and persuaded then Mayor Jane Byrne to block off Michigan Avenue for the first Taste of Chicago on July 4, 1980. A crowd of 100,000 was expected, but more than 250,000 showed up, with food and soda sales grossing $300,000. Since then, the festival has been held annually during the Fourth of July celebrations.

== Personal life ==
Morton was married for a short period after World War II to Adleen June Savin, and had twins: Peter Morton and Pam Morton. Later he met his surviving wife Zorine at a Playboy party in 1960, and they married in 1961. They had five children: sons Michael and David; and daughters Stephanie Morton, Amy Morton-Levin and Debra Morton-Berger. He has a brother, Robert.

His son Peter Morton is the founder and owner of Hard Rock Hotel and Casino and co-founder of Hard Rock Cafe; his daughter Pam Morton is the general manager of Morton's restaurant in Los Angeles; his daughter Amy Morton-Levin is the owner and operator of the restaurant Found in Evanston, Illinois; his son Michael Morton is the head of the N9NE Group which operates contemporary American steakhouses in Las Vegas, Chicago, and Dallas; his daughter Debra Morton-Berger is a documentary filmmaker and TV producer (PBS, A&E, Discovery, COMCAST) and owner of a contemporary European art gallery in Philadelphia; his daughter Stephanie Morton-Millstein is an artist and producer living in Los Angeles; and his son David Morton is the co-owner of the Chicago restaurants—DMK Burger Bar, Fish Bar, County Barbeque, Henry's Swing Club and Ada Street. Morton was the grandfather of the late Harry Morton (1981–2019), President and CEO of the Mexican restaurant chain Pink Taco, and 16 other grandchildren.

Morton died on May 28, 2005, aged 83 at a care home in Deerfield, Illinois. He had Alzheimer's disease and cancer. In recognition of his significant contributions, a resolution was presented to his family from the House of Representatives of the 94th General Assembly of the State of Illinois "so that his memory may be honored and ever cherished".
