= Michael Morton (restaurateur) =

American restaurateur

- Born: 1964 (age 61–62); Chicago, Illinois, U.S.
- Education: University of Denver (BSBA)
- Occupation: Restaurateur
- Known for: Co-founder of N9NE Group and Morton Hospitality
- Spouse: Jenna Marie Devries
- Children: 3
- Parent(s): Arnie Morton; Zorine Morton
- Relatives: Peter Morton (half-brother); David Morton (brother); Harry Morton (nephew)

Michael Morton (born 1964) is an American restaurateur based in Las Vegas. He and his wife, Jenna Morton, co-founded the Las Vegas restaurant company Morton Group, now Morton Hospitality, which operates La Cave Wine & Food Hideaway at Wynn Las Vegas, One Steakhouse at Virgin Hotels Las Vegas and Nudo Italiano in the Southern Highlands area of Las Vegas. Before Morton Hospitality, he co-founded N9NE Group, which developed N9NE Steakhouse, Rain Nightclub and Ghostbar at the Palms Casino Resort. He is the son of Arnie Morton, founder of Morton's The Steakhouse.

== Early life and education ==
Morton is the son of Zorine and Arnie Morton and the grandson of restaurateur Morton C. Morton. His father was of Jewish descent. Morton was raised in Chicago and grew up in his family's restaurant business. He earned a bachelor's degree in business administration from the University of Denver in 1987. He has said an internship at Chicago's Palmer House hotel while he was a student led him to pursue entrepreneurship.

== Career ==
=== Chicago and early nightlife ===
Morton opened his first nightclub, Voodoo, in Chicago in 1990. In 1992 he and Scott DeGraff opened Drink and Eat, Too, a Chicago dance club. It was known for touches such as a VIP bar in an elevator shaft and drinks served in baby bottles. The pair opened Drink in Las Vegas in 1995.

=== N9NE Group ===
Morton and DeGraff formed N9NE Group and opened N9NE Steakhouse in Chicago in 2000. When the Palms Casino Resort opened in Las Vegas in 2001, N9NE Group operated N9NE Steakhouse, Rain Nightclub and Ghostbar there. It later added Moon, Nove Italiano and the Playboy Club. Morton has been credited with creating some of the first lucrative non-gaming nightlife ventures in Las Vegas. The club-like restaurant format the company pioneered became common on the Strip. N9NE Group later expanded to Dallas's Victory Park, opening N9NE Steakhouse and Ghostbar at the W Dallas in 2008 and Nove Italiano in 2009. Morton sold his share of N9NE Group in 2011 to focus on restaurants.

=== Morton Hospitality ===
Michael and Jenna Morton founded Morton Group, later renamed Morton Hospitality, in 2010. Its first restaurant, La Cave Wine & Food Hideaway, opened at Wynn Las Vegas in December 2010. La Cave closed in May 2024 for a renovation led by Karen Herold, who designed the original restaurant. It reopened that August.

In May 2013 the Mortons opened La Comida, a Mexican restaurant in Downtown Las Vegas' Fremont East Entertainment District. Corner Bar Management bought La Comida in October 2022 and renamed it La Mona Rosa.

Crush, an American grill, opened at MGM Grand Las Vegas on December 4, 2013, replacing Nobhill Tavern. In 2018 the Mortons converted a back room at Crush into Greek Sneek, a Greek and Mediterranean restaurant reached through a hidden corridor. Crush closed after service on September 12, 2026, ending a run of nearly 13 years.

In 2017 Morton opened MB Steak at the Hard Rock Hotel and Casino with his brother David Morton. It was their first partnership, and the name stood for "my brothers." After the Hard Rock was rebranded as Virgin Hotels Las Vegas, the brothers replaced MB Steak with One Steakhouse. The new restaurant opened with the resort in March 2021.

In May 2025 the Mortons opened Nudo Italiano in the Southern Highlands community. It was the company's first neighborhood restaurant since La Comida. The menu is led by culinary director William DeMarco. The Las Vegas Review-Journal named La Cave and Nudo Italiano to its 2026 list of the top 100 restaurants in Las Vegas.

=== Current restaurants ===
- La Cave Wine & Food Hideaway, Wynn Las Vegas (2010)
- One Steakhouse, Virgin Hotels Las Vegas (2021), with David Morton
- Nudo Italiano, Southern Highlands (2025)

== Philanthropy ==
The Mortons have supported After-School All-Stars, which extends the school day for low-income students. Morton's involvement follows the example of his father, who adopted Chicago's Westinghouse High School and brought its students to Morton's Steakhouse for kitchen tours. Morton later brought students to Crush through the organization's CEO: Boss Life program. He also established the Michael A. Morton Endowed Scholarship Fund for hospitality students at the University of Denver, with awards beginning in fall 2022.

== Personal life ==
Morton lives in Las Vegas with his wife, Michigan native Jenna Marie (née Devries). The couple has three children. Morton's brothers include Peter Morton, founder of the Hard Rock Hotel and Casino and co-founder of Hard Rock Cafe, and David Morton, a Chicago restaurateur.
