= Taste of Chicago =

Annual food festival in Illinois, U.S.

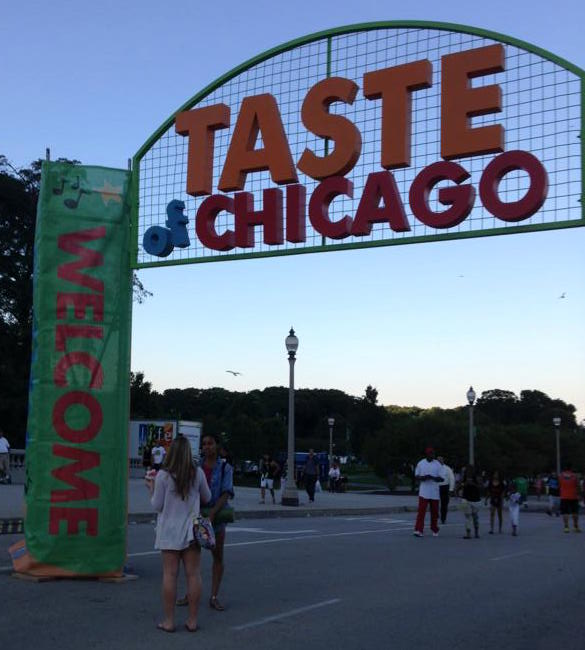
- One of the entrances to the Taste of Chicago in 2013
- Status: Active
- Genre: Food Festival
- Frequency: Annual
- Locations: Grant Park; Chicago, Illinois
- Country: United States
- Years active: 1980–2019, 2022–present
- People: Arnie Morton; Jane Byrne; Lois Weisberg
- Website: tasteofchicago.com

The Taste of Chicago (also known locally as The Taste) is the world's largest food festival, held in July in Chicago, Illinois, in Grant Park. The event is also the largest festival in Chicago. Non-food-related events include live music on multiple stages, including the Petrillo Music Shell, pavilions and performances. Musical acts range from nationally known artists like Carlos Santana, Moby, Kenny Rogers and Robert Plant, to name just a few, to local artists. Since 2008, The Chicago Country Music Festival has been held simultaneously with the Taste of Chicago, but it now has its own two-day festival, typically held in the fall. The Taste of Chicago also has rides such as the Ferris wheel and the Jump to Be Fit, among others.

== History ==
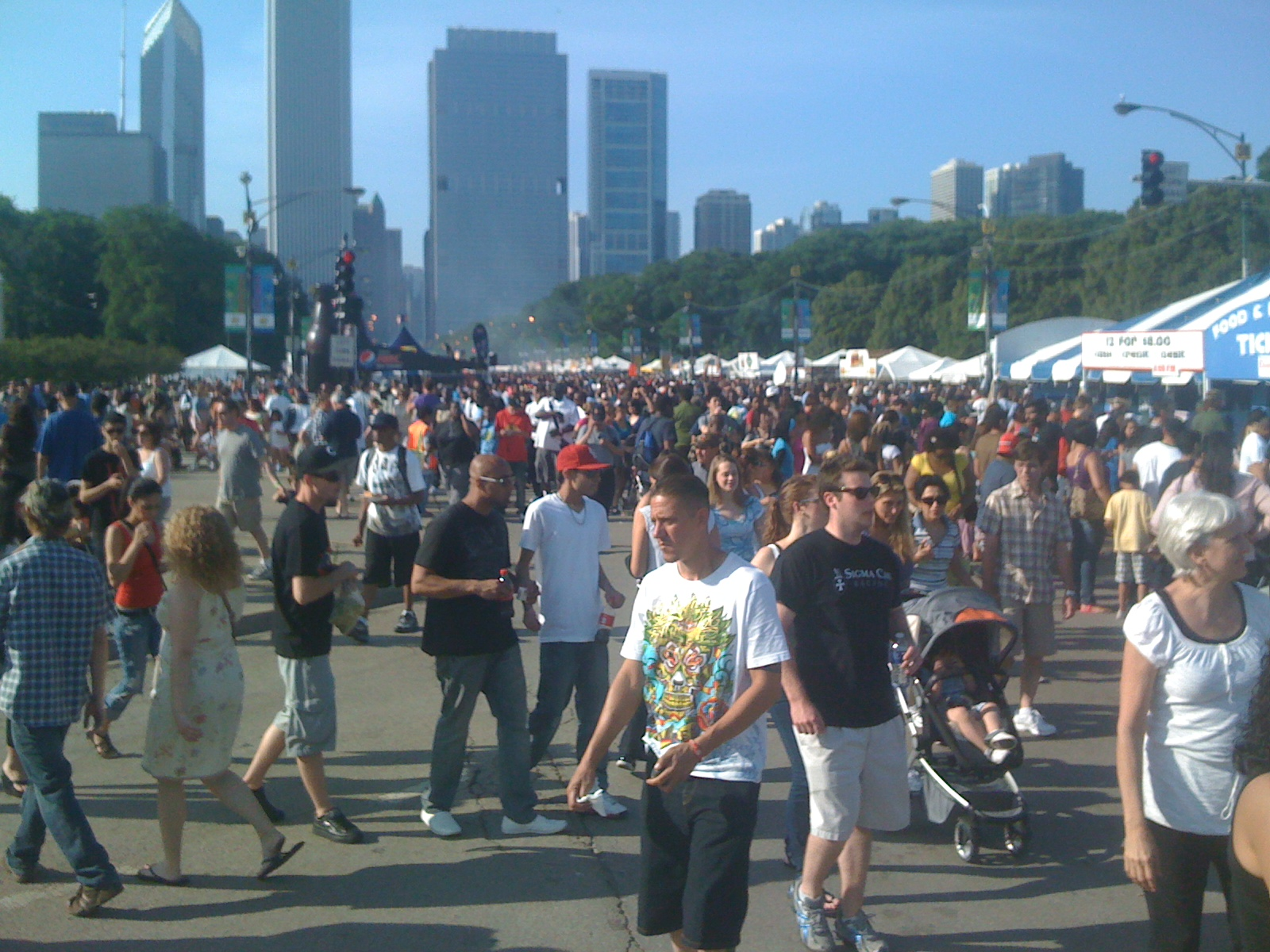
Large crowds at the Taste of Chicago in 2011

ChicagoFest, started by Mayor Michael Bilandic, was the precursor to the Taste of Chicago. After Bilandic's tenure in office, newly elected Mayor Jane Byrne attempted to end the festival as well as many other programs associated with the former mayor. Many Chicagoans disapproved of Mayor Byrne's attempt to stop the festivities (although attendance at ChicagoFest had begun to wane). She and her successor, Mayor Harold Washington, dedicated more time and energy to promoting the Taste, slowly phasing ChicagoFest out in the process. Mayor Washington finally put an end to ChicagoFest when in 1983 it was moved from Navy Pier to Soldier Field and attendance continued to wane.

In 1980, Arnie Morton decided to line up Chicago restaurants to participate and persuaded then-Chicago mayor Jane Byrne and Commissioner of Cultural Affairs Lois Weisberg to block off Michigan Avenue for the first Taste of Chicago on July 4. Although organizers expected 100,000 people, a crowd of over 250,000 showed up, with food and soda sales grossing $300,000 at the festival's inception. The next year, the Taste of Chicago was moved to Grant Park and grew in size and scope, becoming a 10-day event with more food vendors and musical performers; it also became the world's largest food festival.

The popularity of the Taste of Chicago has prompted other cities to spawn numerous offshoots and equivalents throughout North America such as the Taste of Champaign, CityFest in Detroit, the Taste of the Danforth in Toronto, the Taste of Kalamazoo, Taste of Addison, Taste of Denver, Taste in Dallas, Taste of Madison, Taste of Austin, the Taste of Peoria in Peoria, Illinois, and the Bite in Portland to name a few. The first "taste of" festival was Taste of Cincinnati in 1979.

In 2005, the Taste attracted about 3.9 million people with over 70 food vendors. Foods at the event include Chicago-style pizza, Chicago hot dogs, barbecued ribs, Italian Beef, Maxwell Street Polish Sausage, Eli's Cheesecake and a variety of ethnic and regional foods. A total of 3.6 million people visited the 2006 Taste of Chicago. Attendance for the previous record 10-day event, in 2004, was 3.59 million, with $12.33 million in revenue. These lacklustre statistics prompted several changes. The mayor transferred power over the event from the Chicago Park District to the Department of Cultural Affairs and Special Events, and the event was shortened to 5 days. In 2012, the Taste of Chicago ran from July 11 to July 15 and had 36 participating restaurants. In 2013, the Taste of Chicago turned a profit for the first time in six years with sales totaling $272,000. On Saturday, July 12, 2014, the Taste of Chicago closed because of severe weather—the first time the festival was cancelled for the entire day because of "excessive rainfall and flooding on the festival grounds".

In June 2020, the event was one of several Chicago events officially cancelled due to the COVID-19 pandemic; it was replaced by "Taste of Chicago To-Go" programming that included an online directory of vendors, video cooking demonstrations and performances, a food truck procession, and an expansion of the existing Community Eats program that brings free meals to first responders.

== 2007 Salmonella outbreak ==
On July 12, 2007, city officials reported that an outbreak beginning in the Pars Cove Persian Cuisine booth caused 17 people to fall ill due to Salmonella poisoning. Of those affected, three were hospitalized, including one minor. City officials received reports of sickness on Monday but waited to issue a notice until Wednesday. The notice warned the public about symptoms and causes behind the bacteria that is spread by consuming foods contaminated with animal feces. After a thorough investigation of the Pars Cove Persian Cuisine booth, it was determined that the cucumber, hummus, and pomegranate chicken were the source of the illness. The booth failed a previous routine inspection for serving undercooked dishes but city officials did not file the report until Wednesday. City health inspectors found several violations at the restaurant including unsanitary conditions, improper refrigeration, and mouse droppings.

== List of musical performers ==
The festival hosts a wide variety of performers.

6/28/1987	Grant Park Symphony Orchestra
6/29/1987	Albertina Walker
6/30/1987	Grant Park Symphony Orchestra
7/1/1987	Grant Park Symphony Orchestra
7/2/1987	South of the Border Celebration
7/3/1987	Grant Park Symphony Orchestra
7/5/1987	Chicago and Buckinghams
7/1/1988	Restless Heart
7/2/1988	Folk Fest
7/3/1988	Grant Park Symphony Orchestra
7/4/1988	Robert Cray Band
7/5/1988	Mongo Santamaría
7/6/1988	Grant Park Symphony Orchestra
7/7/1988	Grant Park Symphony Orchestra
7/8/1988	Del Shannon and The Chiffons
7/9/1988	Stevie Wonder
7/10/1988	María Conchita Alonso
6/28/1989	Grant Park Symphony Orchestra
6/29/1989	Grant Park Symphony Orchestra
6/30/1989	Tommy James
7/1/1989	Folk Fest
7/2/1989	Roberta Flack
7/3/1989	Grant Park Symphony Orchestra
7/4/1989	BoDeans
6/27/1990	Grant Park Symphony Orchestra
6/28/1990	Grant Park Symphony Orchestra
6/29/1990	George Benson
6/30/1990	The Spinners and The Nylons
7/1/1990	Frankie Avalon and Annette Funicello
7/2/1990	Emmylou Harris
7/3/1990	Grant Park Symphony Orchestra
7/4/1990	The Smithereens, Los Lobos, and Kinsey Report
6/27/1991	Grant Park Symphony Orchestra
6/28/1991	Tommy James
6/29/1991	Larry Carlton
6/30/1991	The Temptations
7/3/1991	Grant Park Symphony Orchestra
7/4/1991	Replacements, NRBQ, and Material Issue
6/27/1992	Grant Park Symphony Orchestra
6/28/1992	Neville Brothers
6/29/1992	Koko Taylor
6/30/1992	Gary Lewis
7/1/1992	Hal Ketchum
7/3/1992	Grant Park Symphony Orchestra
7/4/1992	Robert Cray, Squeeze and They Might Be Giants
7/5/1992	Lee Rittenour
6/25/1993	Grant Park Symphony Orchestra
6/26/1993	John Hiatt, Sonny Landreth and Wailing Souls
6/27/1993	Grover Washington, Tower of Power and Peter White
6/29/1993	The Band, Eric Burdon and the Brian Auger Band, Spirit and John Sebastian
6/30/1993	Kool & the Gang, Ohio Players and War
7/1/1993	Emmylou Harris, Joe Diffie and the Mavericks
7/2/1993	Dwight Yoakam and Suzy Bogguss
7/3/1993	Grant Park Symphony Orchestra
7/4/1993	Matt Sweet, Belly and The Jayhawks
7/2/1994	Grant Park Symphony Orchestra
7/3/1994	Grant Park Symphony Orchestra
7/4/1994	Squeeze, Poi Dog Pondering and Lemonheads
7/5/1994	Barry White
7/6/1994	The Band, Roger McGinnis and Jesse Colin Young
7/7/1994	Subdudes, Buckwheat Zydeco and Clarence “Gatemouth” Brown
7/8/1994	Santana and Jr. Wells
7/9/1994	Ricky Van Shelton, Michelle Wright and Rick Trevino
7/10/1994	Bill Monroe
6/24/1995	Trish Yearwood and Junior Brown
6/25/1995	Diamond Rio and George Ducas
6/27/1995	Poi Dog Pondering
6/28/1995	Badfinger, Foghat and Edgar Winter
6/29/1995	Village People, KC & the Sunshine Band
6/30/1995	George Clinton
7/1/1995	Tom Jones and 911 Mambo
7/2/1995	Gin Blossoms and Alanis Morissette
7/3/1995	Grant Park Symphony Orchestra
7/4/1995	Freddy Jones Band and General Public
6/28/1996	Hank Williams Jr. and Wade Hayes
6/29/1996	Tracy Lawrence & Patty Loveless, Keith Gattis
6/30/1996	Bobby Caldwell
7/2/1996	Three Dog Night, Randy Bachman and Rare Earth
7/3/1996	Grant Park Symphony Orchestra
7/4/1996	Del Amitri, Dishwalla, Paul Westerberg and Wilco
7/5/1996	James Brown
7/6/1996	Harry Connick Jr., Larry Miller and Joe Sample
7/7/1996	GooGoo Dolls
6/27/1997	Bryan White and Marty Stewart
6/28/1997	Wynonna Judd and Paul Brandt
6/29/1997	Gladys Knight
6/30/1997	City Lights Orchestra
7/1/1997	Little Feat and Soniya Dada
7/2/1997	Kool & the Gang and Ohio Players
7/3/1997	Grant Park Symphony Orchestra
7/4/1997	Big Head Todd
7/5/1997	James Taylor
7/6/1997	Cheap Trick and Jayhawks
6/25/1998	Phil Collins
6/26/1998	Suzy Bogguss, John Anderson and Billy Dean
6/27/1998	Faith Hill and Restless Heart
6/28/1998	Smokey Robinson and Lonnie Brooks
6/29/1998	City Lights Orchestra
6/30/1998	Joe Walsh
7/1/1998	Chaka Khan
7/2/1998	Doobie Brothers
7/3/1998	Grant Park Symphony Orchestra
7/4/1998	BoDeans
7/5/1998	Kenny Loggins and Kathleen Wilhoite
6/25/1999	Earth Wind & Fire and Soul Children
6/26/1999	George Jones and Susan Ashton
6/27/1999	Dwight Yoakam and Deana Carter
6/28/1999	Emeril Lagasse
6/29/1999	Chicago
6/30/1999	Isley Brothers
7/1/1999	Peter Frampton and Joan Jett
7/2/1999	REO Speedwagon and Foreigner
7/3/1999	Grant Park Symphony Orchestra
7/4/1999	Cheap Trick
7/5/1999	Brian Setzer and BR549
6/30/2000	Patti LaBelle
7/1/2000	Randy Travis and Montgomery Gentry
7/2/2000	Travis Tritt and Ty Herndon
7/3/2000	Grant Park Symphony Orchestra
7/4/2000	Cracker
7/5/2000	Pointer Sisters
7/6/2000	Matthew Sweet
7/7/2000	Al Green
7/8/2000	Yes and Kansas
7/9/2000	Michael McDonald
6/29/2001	George Clinton
6/30/2001	Waylon Jennings and Asleep at the Wheel
7/1/2001	Leanne Womack and Jessica Andrews
7/2/2001	Wayne Newton
7/3/2001	Grant Park Symphony Orchestra
7/4/2001	Wilco
7/5/2001	Walk Down Abbey Road
7/6/2001	Whispers
7/7/2001	Go-Go's, Marcy Playground
7/8/2001	KC & the Sunshine Band
6/28/2002	Brian McKnight
6/29/2002	Vince Gill and Joanna Janet
6/30/2002	Charlie Daniels and Keith Urban
7/1/2002	4 Tops and O’Jays
7/2/2002	Broadway in Chicago
7/3/2002	Grant Park Symphony Orchestra
7/4/2002	Indigo Girls and Midnight Oil
7/5/2002	Foreigner and Survivor
7/6/2002	Walk Down Abbey Road
7/7/2002	Hootie and the Blowfish
6/27/2003	Erykah Badu
6/28/2003	Loretta Lynn and Steve Azar
6/29/2003	John Michael Montgomery, Deana Carter and Jimmy Wayne
6/30/2003	Kenny Rogers
7/1/2003	Broadway in Chicago
7/2/2003	India.Arie
7/3/2003	Grant Park Symphony Orchestra
7/4/2003	Wallflowers and Guster
7/5/2003	Sheryl Crow
7/6/2003	Elvis Costello and Alice Peacock
6/25/2004	Teena Marie and Maurice Mahon
6/26/2004	Wynonna Judd and Rodney Crowell
6/27/2004	Brad Paisley and Kellie Coffey
6/28/2004	Great Lakes Naval Band
6/29/2004	New Edition
6/30/2004	Stephanie Mills and KEM
7/1/2004	Melissa Etheridge
7/2/2004	Pat Benatar and Peter Frampton
7/3/2004	Grant Park Symphony Orchestra
7/4/2004	Counting Crows, They Might Be Giants and Old 97's
6/24/2005	LL Cool J and Faith Evans
6/25/2005	LeAnn Rimes and Julie Roberts
6/26/2005	Clint Black and Aaron Tippen
6/27/2005	Broadway in Chicago
6/28/2005	Donna Summer
6/29/2005	Gap Band, Morris Day & the Time
6/30/2005	Lynyrd Skynyrd and Credence Clearwater
7/1/2005	Steve Winwood and Dr. John
7/2/2005	Santana, Los Lonely Boys and Salvador Santana Band
7/3/2005	Grant Park Symphony Orchestra
7/4/2005	Moby and John Hiatt
6/30/2006	The O’Jays
7/1/2006	Glen Campbell, Yonder Mountain String Band and Phil Vassar
7/2/2006	Jo Dee Messina and SHeDAISY
7/3/2006	Grant Park Symphony Orchestra
7/4/2006	Ray Davies, My Morning Jacket and Mike Doughty
7/5/2006	India.Arie and Anthony Hamilton
7/6/2006	Train and Matt Kearney
7/7/2006	Macy Gray and Liquid Soul
7/8/2006	Liz Phair and Fountains of Wayne
7/9/2006	Dennis DeYoung and Kenny Wayne Shepherd
6/29/2007	Frankie Beverly and Maze
6/30/2007	Kenny Rogers
7/1/2007	Sara Evans and Craig Morgan
7/2/2007	Broadway in Chicago
7/3/2007	Grant Park Symphony Orchestra
7/4/2007	John Mayer
7/5/2007	Lyfe Jennings
7/6/2007	The Black Crowes and Umphreys McGee
7/7/2007	Cheap Trick, Soul Asylum and Cracker
7/8/2007	Los Lonely Boys and Brandi Carlile
6/27/2008	Chaka Khan and Angie Stone
6/28/2008	Stevie Wonder
6/29/2008	Plain White T's and Josh Kelly
6/30/2008	Broadway in Chicago
7/1/2008	Joss Stone and Ryan Shaw
7/2/2008	Fantasia and Estelle
7/3/2008	Grant Park Symphony Orchestra
7/4/2008	Gomez, Old 97's and Alejandro Escovedo
7/5/2008	Bonnie Raitt
7/6/2008	Aly & AJ and Keke Palmer
6/26/2009	Charlie Wilson and the Gap Band, Cameo
6/27/2009	Counting Crows and Augustana
6/28/2009	The Wallflowers and Lovehammers
6/29/2009	Broadway in Chicago
6/30/2009	Barenaked Ladies
7/1/2009	Ne-Yo and Keri Hilson
7/2/2009	Super Diamond and Afrodisiacs
7/3/2009	85th Army Band and Fireworks Spectacular
7/4/2009	Buddy Guy, Buster and DBT's
7/5/2009	Mitchell Musso and Jordan Pruitt
6/25/2010	Bell Biv Devoe, Slick Rick and Salt-n-Pepa
6/26/2010	Gavin Rossdale and Band from TV
6/27/2010	Emily Osment and Allstar Weekend
6/28/2010	Broadway in Chicago
6/29/2010	Los Lobos and Los Lonely Boys
6/30/2010	Mat Kearney and Brett Dennen
7/1/2010	Trey Songz and Teairra Marí
7/2/2010	Rob Thomas
7/3/2010	Steve Miller Band
7/4/2010	Passion Pit, Robert Randolph, Alejandro Escovedo and Carney
6/24/2011	Los Horoscopos de Durango
6/25/2011	Rare Earth and Soul Asylum
6/26/2011	Donald Lawrence & Company
6/27/2011	Broadway in Chicago
6/28/2011	Material Re-Issue and The Lemonheads
6/29/2011	Natalie MacMaster
6/30/2011	Natalie Cole
7/1/2011	Courtyard Hounds and Loretta Lynn
7/2/2011	Everest and Jayhawks
7/3/2011	Greyson Chance
7/11/2012	Jennifer Hudson and Luke James
7/12/2012	Death Cab for Cutie and Calexico
7/13/2012	Michael Franti & Spearhead and Fitz & the Tantrums
7/14/2012	Chaka Khan and Raphael Saadiq
7/15/2012	Dierks Bentley and Lindi Ortega
7/10/2013	Fun. and Delta Spirit
7/11/2013	Robin Thicke and Estelle
7/12/2013	Robert Plant Presents the Sensational Space Shifters
7/13/2013	Jill Scott
7/14/2013	Neon Trees and The Mowgli's
7/9/2014	AWOLNATION
7/10/2014	Janelle Monáe and Gary Clark Jr.
7/11/2014	Nickel Creek and Emmylou Harris
7/12/2014	Jeff Tweedy
7/13/2014	Aloe Blacc and The Wailers
7/8/2015	Weezer
7/9/2015	Erykah Badu
7/10/2015	The Chieftains
7/11/2015	Spoon
7/12/2015	Maze featuring Frankie Beverly
7/6/2016	The Roots and Donnie Trumpet
7/7/2016	Kongos, Elle King and Transviolet
7/8/2016	The Decemberists and Shakey Graves
7/9/2016	Billy Idol and Sons of the Silent Age
7/10/2016	The Isley Brothers featuring Ronald and Ernie Isley, and Shelia E.
7/5/2017	Alessia Cara and Eryn Allen Kane
7/6/2017	Café Tacvba and ¡Esso! Afrojam Funkbeat with Los Vicios de Papá
7/7/2017	Ben Harper & The Innocent Criminals and Twin Peaks
7/8/2017	Passion Pit and The Kickback
7/9/2017	The O’Jays and Maurice Jackson's Independents
7/11/2018	Brandi Carlile
7/12/2018	Juanes
7/13/2018	Black Star
7/14/2018	The Flaming Lips
7/15/2018	Parliament Funkadelic
7/10/2019	Courtney Barnett
7/11/2019	Bomba Estéreo and Puerto Rican Cultura Profética
7/12/2019	De La Soul
7/13/2019	The Strumbellas and lovelytheband
7/14/2019	India.Arie and Meshell Ndegeocello
2020	Canceled
2021	Canceled
7/8/2022	Nelly
7/9/2022	Aterciopelados
7/10/2022	Drive-By Truckers and Local H
9/8/2023	Hip Hop 50 featuring Doug E. Fresh, EPMD, KRS-One and Slick Rick
9/9/2023	Proyecto Uno
9/10/2023	Whitney
