= Rumjungle =

Restaurant and nightclub in Las Vegas, Nevada, US

Coordinates: 36.0930°N 115.1762°W

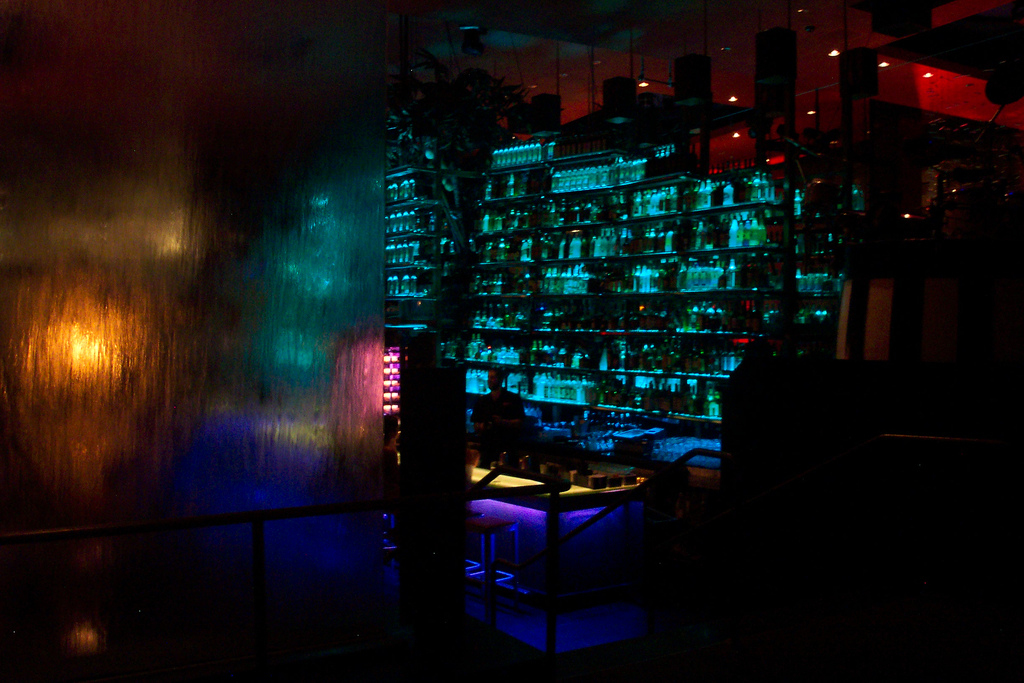
- The bar at Rumjungle
- Interactive map of Rumjungle

Restaurant information
- Established: 1999; 27 years ago
- Closed: August 9, 2010
- Location: 3950 Las Vegas Blvd., Las Vegas, Clark County, Nevada, 89109, United States

Rumjungle was a popular Las Vegas restaurant and nightclub that was opened in 1999 and was built as a part of the Mandalay Bay Resort and Casino original construction. It consistently made the Nightclub & Bar Magazine list of the Top 100 nightclubs in the United States, and was in the Top 20 of Restaurant & Institutions Top 100 Grossing Restaurants in the United States.

== Menu ==
It was the largest Brazilian (Churrascaria style) restaurant in the world, and had the largest rum list in the world; its rum bar was 144 feet long and 19 feet high. The menu also contained culinary influences from the Caribbean and Africa.

== Interior ==
Sheets of glass with running water were used to divide the space between sections of the club. At the rear was a generous dancefloor with the DJ and Drummer platforms close by. The interior was designed by Jeffrey Beers International. Purchase of dinner allowed guests to skip the line and cover charge in the back dancefloor area.

== Closure ==
Rumjungle filed for bankruptcy in March 2010 and has since closed.

== See also ==
- List of restaurants in the Las Vegas Valley
