= The Black Sheep (restaurant) =

- Interactive map of The Black Sheep

Restaurant information
- Owners: Jamie Tran Jon Schwalb
- Head chef: Jamie Tran
- Food type: Vietnamese-American
- Dress code: Casual
- Location: 8680 W Warm Springs Rd, Las Vegas, Clark County, Nevada, 89148, United States
- Coordinates: 36°03′22.5″N 115°16′51.7″W
- Reservations: Yes
- Website: blacksheepvegas.com

The Black Sheep is a Vietnamese-American restaurant in Las Vegas, Nevada. In 2017, the Black Sheep was named restaurant of the year by Eater Las Vegas.

== History ==
Andy Hooper, Jon Schwalb, and chef Jamie Tran opened the Black Sheep after DB Brassiere, where Tran served as executive sous chef, closed at the Venetian, freeing up Tran. The three wanted to open a restaurant away from the Las Vegas Strip. They decided to open up a restaurant in a strip mall on the southwest side of Las Vegas, in an area where few casual fine dining restaurants existed and where Schwalb and Hoover live. They began renovating the space, which was formally occupied by Soulfish Poke, in February 2017 and opened in May. The restaurant was named the Black Sheep because Tran identifies as the black sheep of her family.

Chef Tran competed in Season 18 of Top Chef on Bravo, finishing in fourth place.

== Design ==
Hooper, Schwalb and Tran co-designed the restaurant, which is located in a strip mall. The dining room is 1,350 square feet in size. The walls are painted different levels of gray and a large panoramic photograph of a sheep farm is placed on one wall. The entry way is decorated with various sized mirrors.

== Cuisine ==
The Black Sheep serves Vietnamese-American fusion food. Tran, who is Vietnamese American, pulls inspiration from traditional Vietnamese food she ate growing up. She uses French cooking techniques, which she learned while cooking at Aureole and DB Brassiere. The idea to make Black Sheep a Vietnamese-American restaurant was inspired by the family meals Tran would prepare when working at DB Brasserie, which were often Vietnamese-inspired. Andy Hooper enjoyed the meals and suggested that be the focus for the Black Sheep and Tran would be chef.

=== Food ===
Appetizers at Black Sheep include an imperial roll stuffed with pork, shrimp, pickled heirloom carrots, daikon radish, and frisee and a bao with pork sausage, fried quail egg, fried shallots, herbs and aioli made of jalapeño. The menu may include an heirloom beet salad with two types of beets, citrus and goat cheese yogurt, walnuts, black radish, watercress and "beet dust"; salmon skin tacos; and fried beef crisps

Entreés include braised Duroc pork on top of cauliflower puree, sautéed kabocha squash and fried pig ear "salad" and a whole fried trout. Vietnamese curry chicken features a chicken thigh sitting atop roasted carrots, marble potatoes, and beluga lentils. The brunch menu includes eggs Benedict served with lemongrass-braised short ribs. The most expensive meal on the menu, at $31, is an eight-ounce rib eye.

=== Beverages ===
The restaurant has a full bar and a wine list. It offers a flight of Japanese whiskey. The cocktail menu changes with the menu. In the past, cocktails have included The Pink Sheep, in which proceeds benefitted the American Cancer Society and a martini made with Thai basil. The signature house cocktail is The Black Sheep, comprising coffee, Jim Beam, creme de cacao, vanilla creme syrup, and Uinta Baby Black Lager with Fernet-Branca infused whipped cream.

== Reception ==
In December 2017, the Black Sheep was named Restaurant of the Year and Tran was named Chef of the Year by Eater Las Vegas. The Black Sheep was named as having the best offal dish, deep-fried tendon crisps, in 2018 by Las Vegas Weekly.

The Infatuation touts the restaurant's casual ambiance and gourmet food: "Usually, food this good means putting on your dry-clean-only clothes and making a reservation a month in advance. Thankfully, this place feels way more casual - you won’t be out of place in jeans - and reservations aren’t hard to come by." 10Best.com calls the Black Sheep food "crafted carefully to be both delicious and a new version of Vietnamese comfort food."

Regarding service, the Las Vegas Review-Journal critiqued the restaurant's method of not bringing new utensils to replace used utensils during service and the use of paper napkins versus cloth. In contrast, the newspaper had praise for the food and cocktails and described the ambiance as "vaguely industrial" while "adding an air of urban sophistication."

== See also ==
List of restaurants in the Las Vegas Valley
