= Evel Pie =

Pizzeria in Las Vegas, Nevada

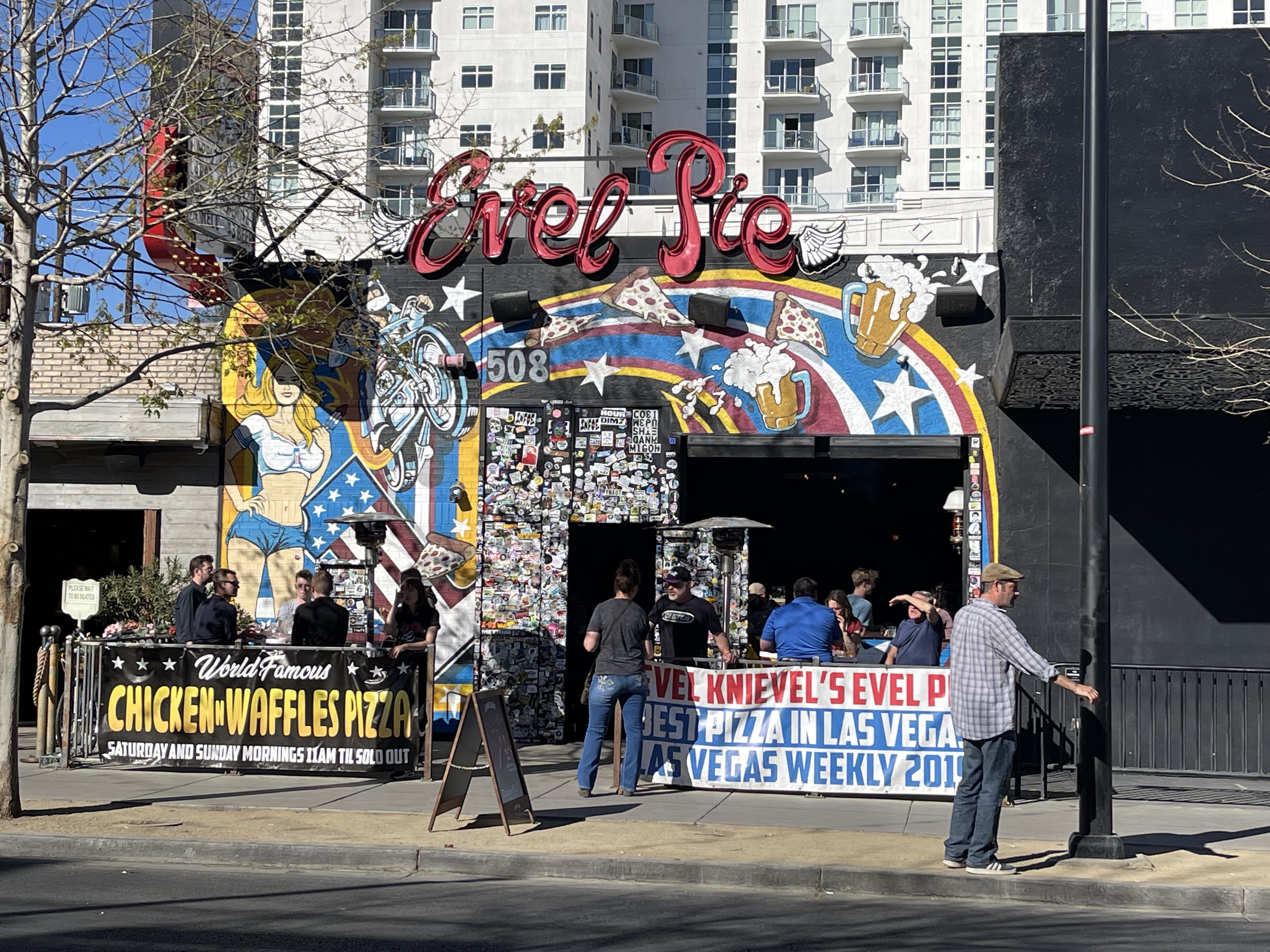
- Evel Pie in March 2022
- Interactive map of Evel Pie

Restaurant information
- Established: 2016
- Food type: Pizza
- Dress code: Casual
- Location: 508 Fremont St, Las Vegas, Clark County, Nevada, 89101, United States
- Coordinates: 36°10′09.3″N 115°08′24.3″W
- Reservations: No
- Website: evelpie.com

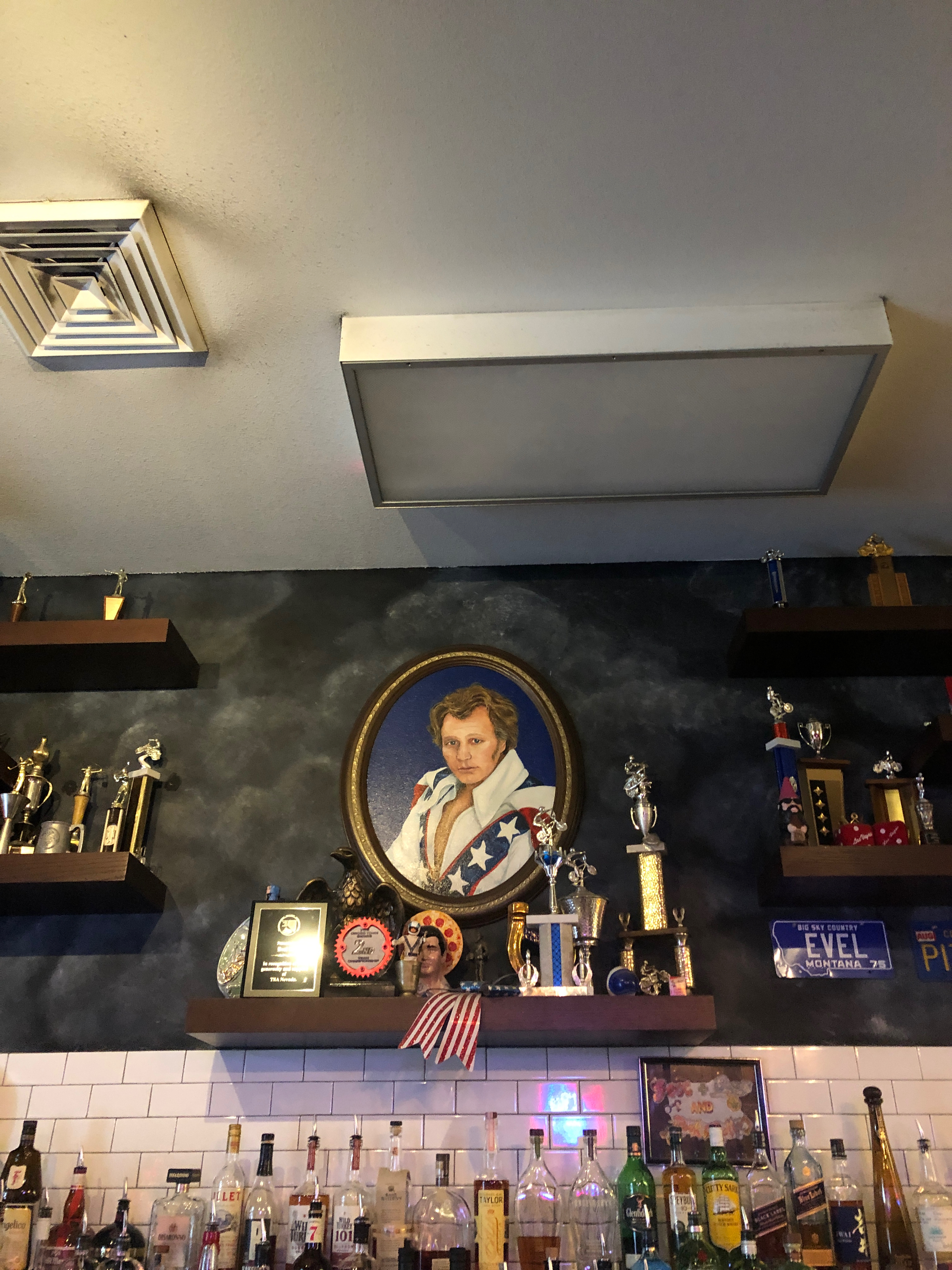
Evel Knievel memorabilia above the bar at Evel Pie.

Evel Pie is a pizzeria in Las Vegas, Nevada in the United States. The restaurant is named after Evel Knievel and features memorabilia related to the entertainer. The motto of the restaurant is "Live Hard, Ride Fast, Eat Pizza." Evel Pie made international news after introducing a chapulines (grasshopper) pizza.

== History ==
Evel Pie was conceived and created by the Lev Food Group, who collaborated with Kelly Knievel, Evel Knievel’s son, to develop the restaurant. It opened in 2016.

== Cuisine and beverages ==
Evel Pie serves New York-style pizza. The menu includes classic cheese and pepperoni pizzas, as well as specialty pizzas including "Balls to the Wall" made with meatballs and gravy, a pizza with rattlesnake jalapeńo sausage, and Hog Heaven, a pizza with barbecue sauce, smoked mozzarella, fontina, pulled pork, bacon, and red onions. There is also a white pizza, without tomato sauce, named after Barry White. The restaurant also offers house-made meatballs topped with tomato sauce. In 2019, Evel Pie introduced a chapulines (grasshopper) pizza named "The Canyon Hopper." The pizza was created after countless grasshoppers swarmed Las Vegas, triggering the weather radar to report it as a storm.

The restaurant has a full bar and serves inexpensive beer, including Schiltz and Hamm's.

== Design ==
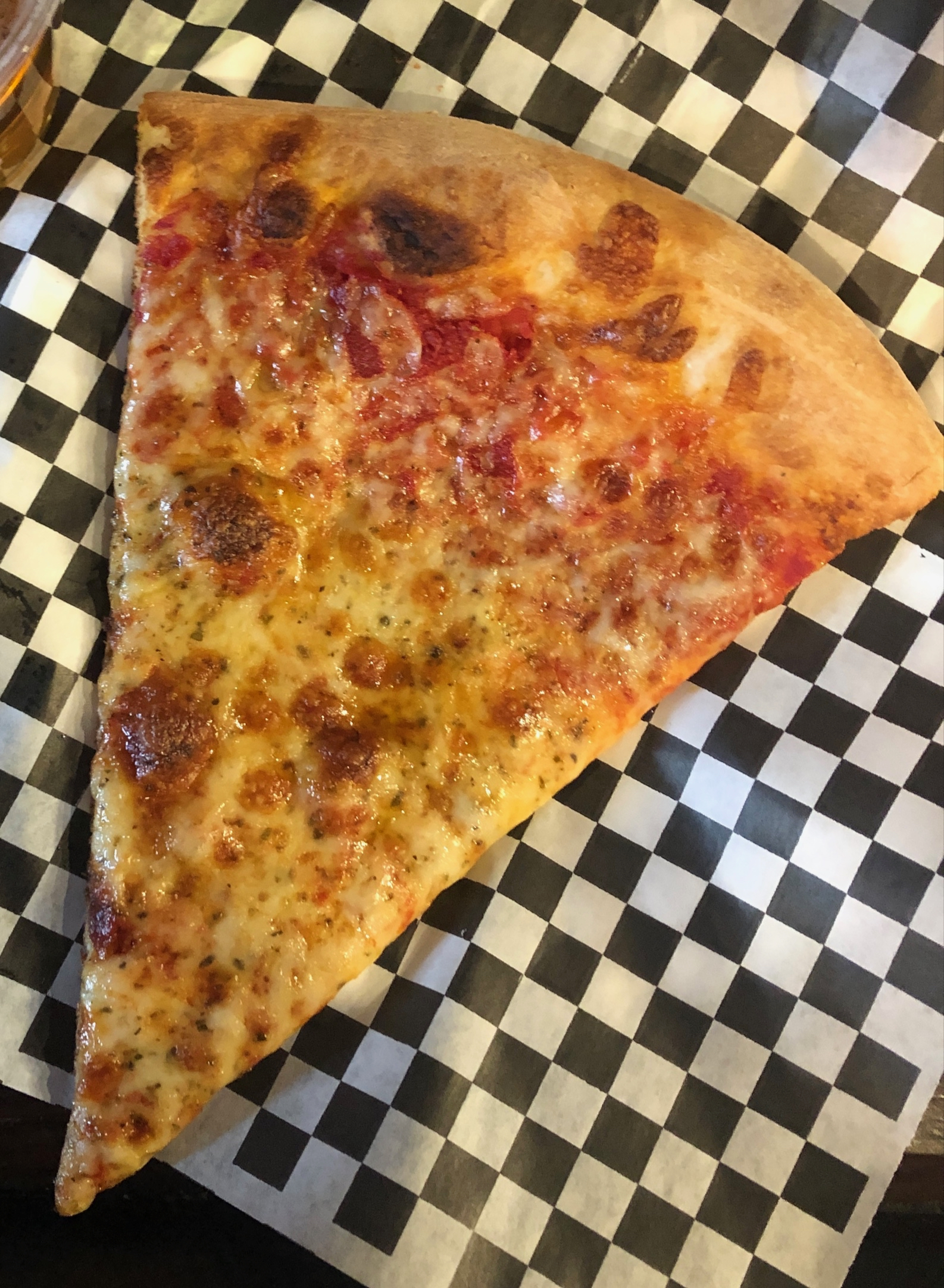
A slice of cheese pizza at Evel Pie

The restaurant and bar are a tribute to Evel Knievel. It is based on a pizzeria built in 1979 and features Evel Knievel memorabilia, the majority of which comes from the collection of the Knievel family. Memorabilia includes a pinball machine, skateboards, bicycles, photographs, and a bust of Knievel.

== Reviews ==
Since its launch, Evel Pie has received widespread acclaim and has been featured in Eater Vegas, Thrillist, and the Las Vegas Review-Journal. It has won multiple awards, including “Best Pizza in Las Vegas” from various publications.

== See also ==
- List of restaurants in the Las Vegas Valley
