= N9NE Group =

Nine Group
- Current logo
- Industry: Food service Hospitality
- Founded: 1992
- Founder: Michael Morton; Scott DeGraff
- Headquarters: Las Vegas, Nevada
- Area served: Las Vegas (1995-Present); Chicago (1992-2013); Dallas (Formerly)
- Services: N9NE Steakhouse; Ghostbar

The Nine Group (stylized as N9NE Group) is a company that owns and operates restaurants and nightclubs at the Palms Hotel and Casino in Las Vegas, and formerly in Chicago and Dallas. The N9NE Group was founded by Michael Morton and Scott DeGraff. The son of restaurateur Arnie Morton, Morton grew up in the restaurant business, while Scott DeGraff had pursued a career as a real estate attorney.

== Etymology ==
Morton and DeGraff were friends since the age of nine, which is the source of the company's name.

== History ==
=== Chicago ===
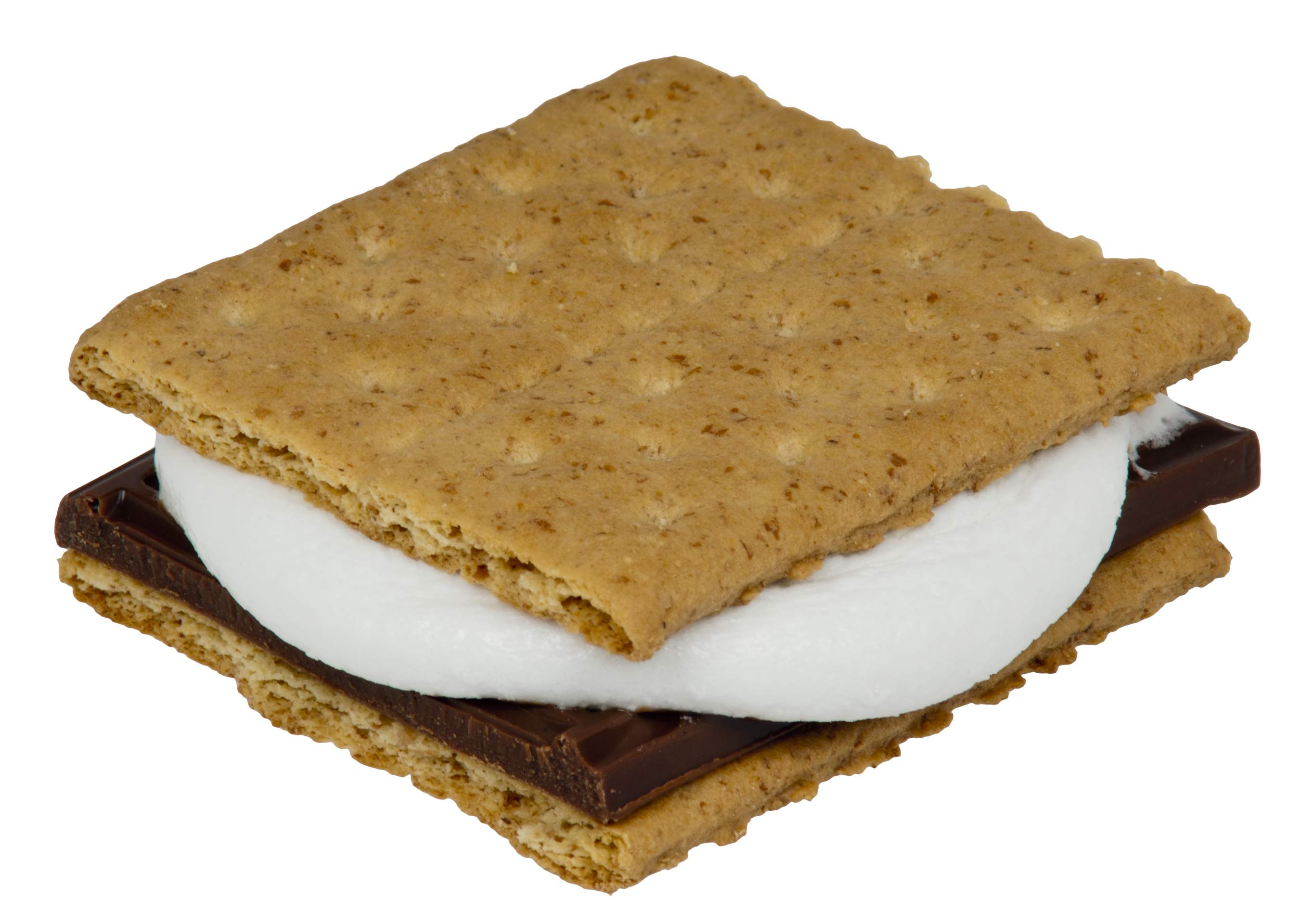
A s'more. Before closing, the N9NE Steakhouse in Chicago allowed diners to create their own s'mores for the dessert course.

In 1992, Morton and DeGraff partnered and launched the nightclub Drink and Eat, Too in Chicago. Eight years later, N9NE Steakhouse and Ghostbar opened in Chicago in April 2000. The steakhouse, located at the Daniel Burnham-designed Randolph Place at 440 West Randolph, was open late on Fridays and Saturdays until midnight, and it was closed every Sunday except for conventions. Ghostbar was located at the upper level of the N9NE Steakhouse, and it was able to accommodate a maximum of 250 guests for cocktail and hors d'oeuvre receptions and 150 guests for a normal dinner. Taking both the main floor steakhouse and the upper level Ghostbar into account, the Chicago location was able to accommodate anywhere from 15 to 800 patrons at a time. Tim Griffin, a figurehead at the Chicago location, was overseeing operations in 2011 and 2012 when the steakhouse received two consecutive Michelin recommendations. The Chicago location hosted the first fundraiser for Barack Obama's "Victory 2012" presidential campaign. Despite being Michelin-recommended again in 2013, N9NE Steakhouse Chicago permanently closed for unknown reasons on Monday, June 10, 2013.

=== Las Vegas ===
The Nine Group opened Drink in Las Vegas in 1995. Six years later, in 2001, George J. Maloof, Jr. of the Maloof family and owner of the Palms Hotel and Casino asked DeGraff and Morton to recreate their Chicago steakhouse N9NE and after-hours Ghostbar at the Palms. N9NE opened Rain Nightclub, Ghostbar, N9NE Steakhouse, and Skin Pool Lounge — all at the Palms.

For Earth Day 2009, the N9NE Group unveiled the Regional Transportation Commission of Southern Nevada's (RTC) first Grease Bus, powered by used vegetable oil from N9NE Steakhouse.

==== Playboy Club at the Fantasy Tower at the Palms ====
In 2006, N9NE opened the Playboy Club at the Fantasy Tower at the Palms, the first Playboy Club since 1988, in partnership with Playboy Enterprises. Michael Morton's father, Chicago restaurateur Arnie Morton, built and operated the original chain of Playboy nightclubs. The Las Vegas Playboy Club closed in summer 2012.

=== Dallas ===
In Dallas, Morton and DeGraff partnered with Ross Perot Jr. to create a "new urban showcase" in Victory Park featuring Nove Italiano, N9NE Steakhouse, Ghostbar, and the retail store Stuff.

== Environmental activity ==
The N9NE Group, in conjunction with Green Mountain Energy's BeGreen Business division, works to make its nightclubs environmentally conscious. In 2007, the N9NE Group offset 100% of its electricity usage by purchasing renewable energy credits made from wind and biomass sources. The company also offers guests the opportunity to purchase a "BeGreen" ticket to help the company continue to purchase renewable energy credits. The N9NE Group has used Sustainable Waves' solar powered lighting and sound equipment at many of its events.

== See also ==
- List of restaurants in the Las Vegas Valley
