= One Paseo =

Mixed-use development in San Diego, California

One Paseo is a 23.6-acre (9.6 ha) mixed-use development in Carmel Valley, San Diego, at the southwest corner of Del Mar Heights Road and El Camino Real. It had a soft opening in March 2019 and will have a total of 96,000 square feet of retail and restaurants, 280,000 square feet of office space and 608 luxury apartments. This was reduced from an original plan for more density in a 2015 compromise with community groups.

Tenants include Sephora, SoulCycle, Shake Shack, CAVA, Salt & Straw and Blue Bottle Coffee. International Smoke is a restaurant by San Francisco celebrity chef Michael Mina and cookbook author Ayesha Curry.
