= Morton's The Steakhouse =

American restaurant chain

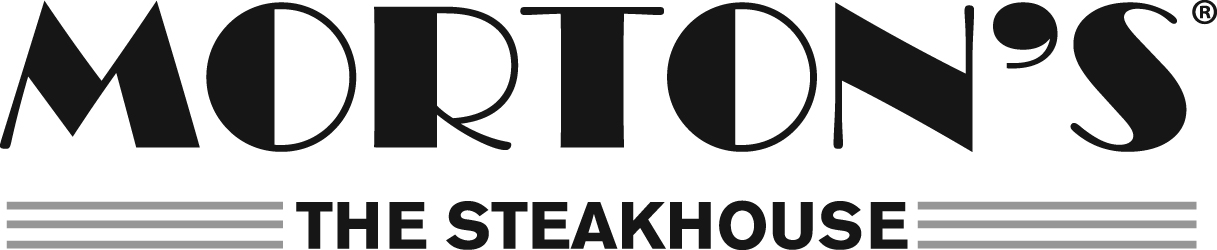
- "The Best Steak Anywhere!"

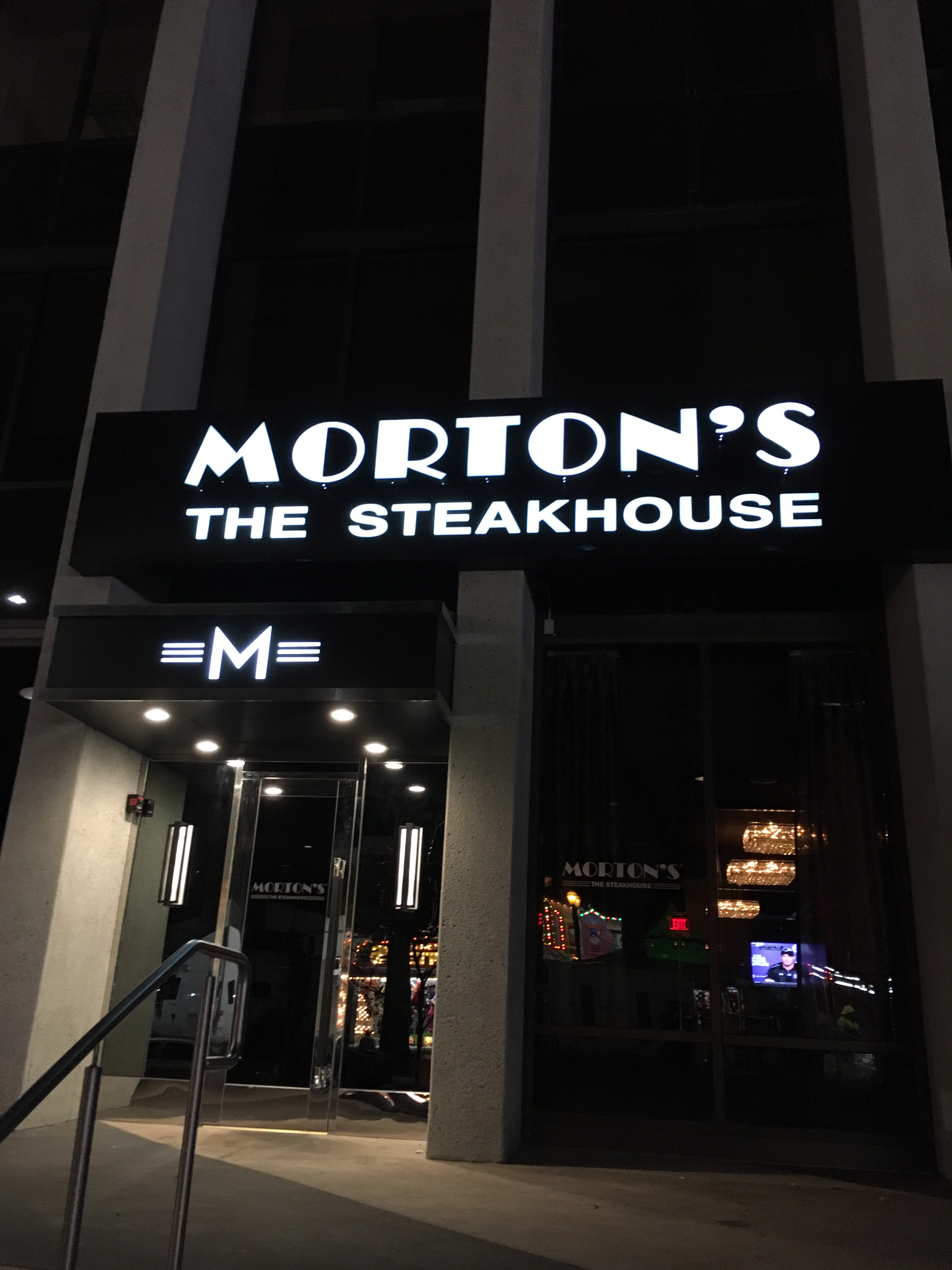
- Morton's The Steakhouse, San Jose, CA
- Founded: February 17, 1978; 48 years ago in Chicago, Illinois, United States
- Founder: Arnold J. Morton and Klaus Fritsch
- Headquarters: 1510 West Loop S, Houston, Texas, United States
- Number of locations: 54 in United States, 8 overseas, 12 franchised (included before)
- Key people: Tilman J. Fertitta, President, CEO & sole owner Gary Bullers, Regional Director of Operations; Ralph Cook, Regional Director of Operations Richard H. Liem, Treasurer and Vice President; Steven L. Scheinthal Esq., Vice President, General Counsel and Secretary
- Products: Steaks, wine, seafood
- Revenue: $66.029 million (estimated)
- Number of employees: 4154 (3 September 2017)
- Parent: Landry's
- Website: www.mortons.com

Morton's The Steakhouse is a chain of steak restaurants with locations in the United States and franchised abroad, founded in Chicago in 1978. It is a wholly owned subsidiary of Landry's.

== History ==
Morton's was co-founded in 1978 by Arnold J. Morton and Klaus Fritsch. Morton and Fritsch worked together at the Playboy Club in Montreal, Quebec, Canada. While the club was in the process of changing its menu, Fritsch prepared a hamburger for Morton to sample. Morton said the burger was the best he'd ever tasted. Together, they opened Morton's of Chicago in Newberry Plaza in Downtown Chicago. The original location closed in November 2020 as a result of the COVID-19 pandemic.

In 1987, Morton's was sold for $12.4 million to the venture capital firm Quantum Restaurant Group, Inc. Fritsch stayed on as president.

In December 2011, Tilman Fertitta, President, CEO and sole owner of Landry's, Inc., announced his company had acquired all of Morton's stock, assuming complete ownership. In 2012, Landry's completed the acquisition and moved company operations to its own headquarters in Houston.

=== Support for Brett Kavanaugh ===
In July 2022, Supreme Court Justice Brett Kavanaugh attended a dinner at Morton's location in Washington, DC, but left before his dessert course due to the presence of pro-choice protesters from the activist group "ShutDownDC" demanding his removal. Kavanaugh reportedly did not see, hear, or encounter the protestors, nor was he harassed in any way. Nonetheless, Morton's was "outraged" and sided with Kavanaugh in a press statement, citing what it termed a "right to congregate and eat dinner".

Morton's was subsequently protested by pro-choice activists, receiving a flood of fake reservations. Morton's Chief Operating Officer acknowledged that the company's statement was extremely unpopular, and reportedly told restaurant managers that "Currently we are experiencing a massive wave (trending at #2 on social media now) of negative response to our comments yesterday."

== Affiliates ==
- Bubba Gump Shrimp Company
- Cadillac Bar
- Landry's, Inc.
- Landry's Seafood
- Rainforest Cafe
