= Bardot Brasserie =

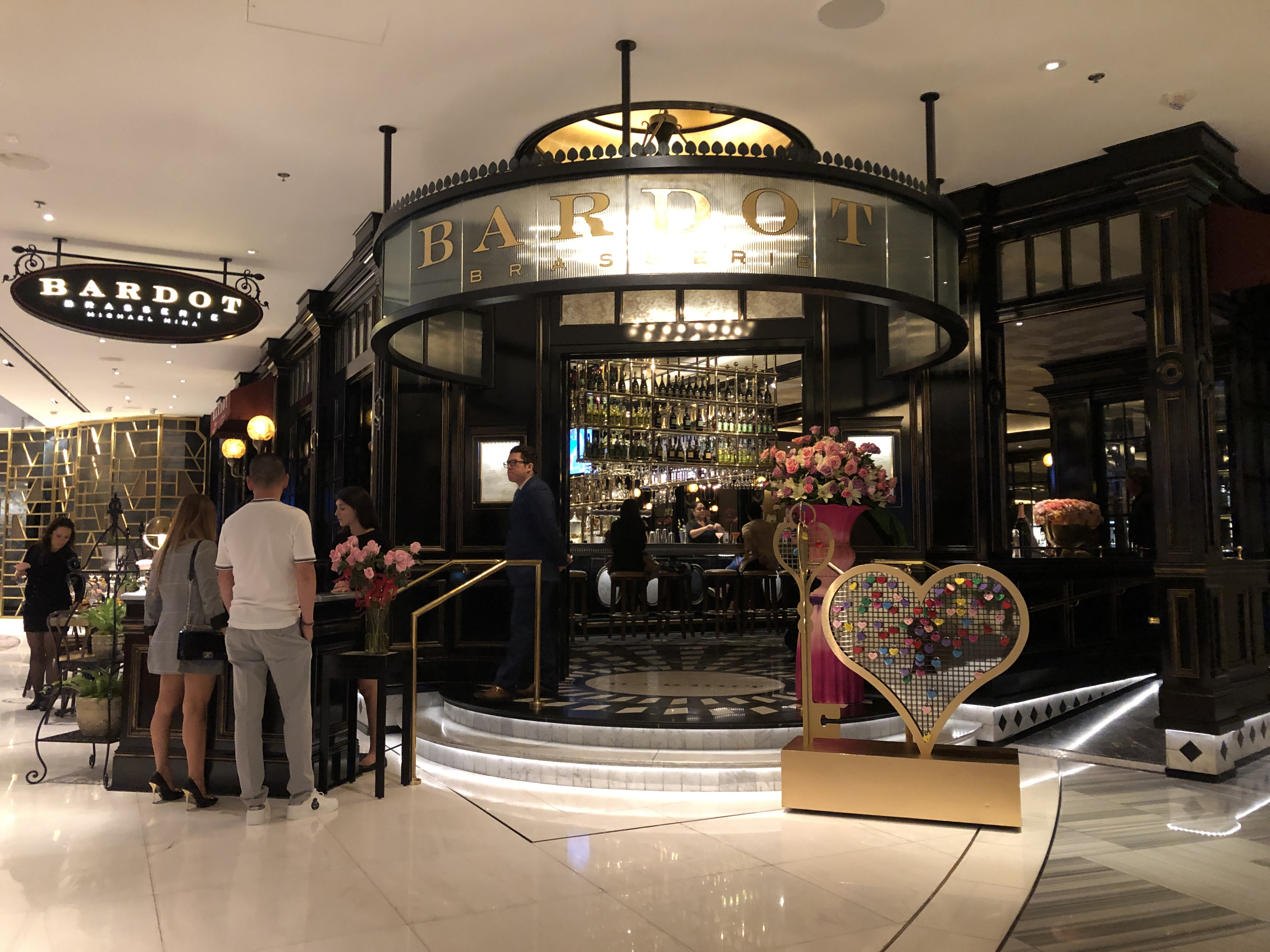
- Interactive map of Bardot Brasserie

Restaurant information
- Established: January 16, 2015
- Owner: Michael Mina
- Head chef: Josh Smith
- Food type: French
- Dress code: Business casual
- Rating: Zagat - 4.5
- Location: 3730 S Las Vegas Boulevard, Las Vegas, Clark County, Nevada, 89109, United States
- Coordinates: 36.107271°N 115.176531°W
- Seating capacity: 240
- Reservations: Yes
- Website: www.aria.com/en/restaurants/bardot-brasserie.html

Bardot Brasserie (English: /bɑːrˈdoʊ/, French: [baʁdo]) is a French restaurant in Las Vegas, Nevada in the United States. Owned by Michael Mina, the restaurant is located at the Aria Resort and Casino.

== History ==
Named after Brigitte Bardot, Bardot Brasserie opened in January 2015. The 26th restaurant opened by chef Michael Mina, it is located on the site of Mina's former American Fish restaurant, which he opened in December 2009. Mina's contract ended with American Fish and the Aria Resort and Casino proposed the opportunity for a new concept to Mina, who had always wanted to open restaurant with modern interpretations of classic French food. Mina and staff at the Aria traveled to Paris to research concepts for the restaurant. Josh Smith serves as executive chef.

== Design and ambiance ==
The restaurant is modeled after a traditional brasserie. It was designed by YWS Design & Architecture. The restaurant cost $3 million. The entrance is circular and guests walk up a set of stairs to enter. The dining room has cane chairs, burgundy leather booths, bistro tables and white marble floors. The restaurant has dark lighting. Fresh roses decorate each table and the cutlery is made by Laguiole. There is a faux-sidewalk "patio" that is located out front of the restaurant. Near the entrance is a rectangular bar made of zinc and brass. It took six months to design the bar. Spirits are displayed on a brass shelf that is suspended from the ceiling. The kitchen is an open model.

== Cuisine and beverages ==
=== Food ===
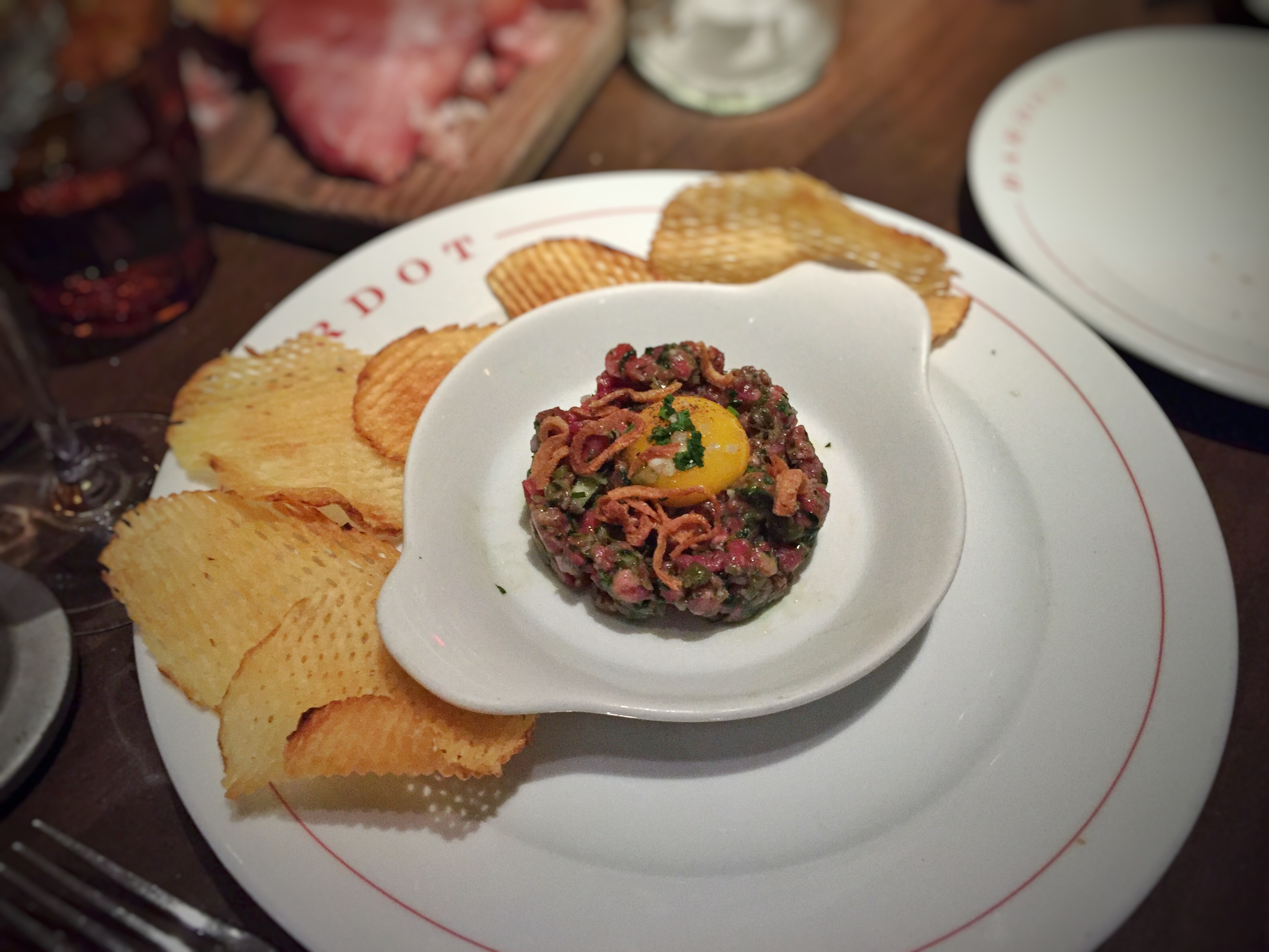
Steak tartare at Bardot Brasserie.

Bardot Brasserie serves traditional French food. The restaurant serves dinner seven days a week and brunch on Saturday and Sunday. Dining service starts with a demi-baguette with butter. Salads include frisée with lardons and a caesar salad with endive and King crab. Appetizers include duck a l'orange wings, onion soup gratinee with truffles and cave-aged gruyere cheese, steak tartare, and escargot in puffed pastry. An additional appetizer includes Lobster Thermidor for two. Entrees include croque madame, sautéed skate wing, gnocchi with mushrooms and goat cheese, and salade niçoise with yellowfin tuna. Steak frites are offered with various cuts of meat, including flat iron, ribeye, and filet. Five sauces are available for the steak frites, including blue cheese fondue and bordelaise. Frites are cooked in duck fat. There is a roasted chicken sourced from Bill Bobo's chicken farm. The chicken's preparation is similar to Peking duck. Sides include a mushroom and leek bread pudding. The bar menu includes a hamburger made with prime rib, oysters and salmon tartare.

The brunch menu includes buckwheat crepes with crab, mushroom and an egg, seasonal fruit with yogurt and buckwheat beignets, and brioche French toast. The restaurant has five types of eggs Benedict, including avocado and short ribs, all which are served with croissants and a side of sautéed kale.

Desserts include pavlova with lavender gelato and vanilla meringue. Others include a large macaron and lemon meringue tarts.

=== Drinks ===
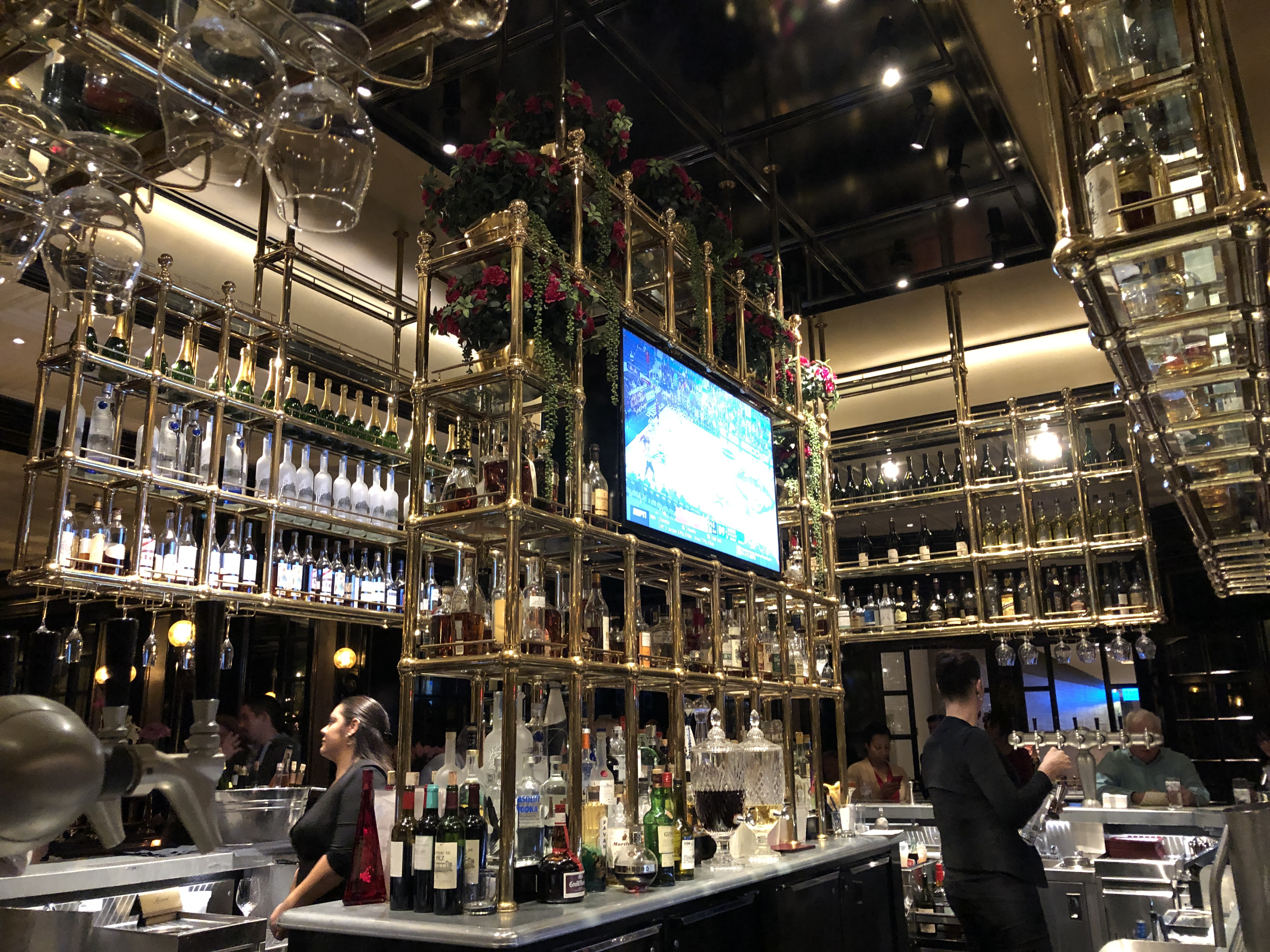
Spirits sit on a brass shelf that is suspended from the ceiling at the bar.

The bar specializes in craft cocktails, many of which are historic. The menu includes a French 75, a Manhattan, and a Corpse Reviver#2. They also have traditional cocktails made with unique ingredients, like an Old Fashioned made with mezcal. During brunch they have a Bloody Mary that uses tomato juice from Roma tomatoes. The bar has the largest selection of Chartreuse in Las Vegas and cognacs from the 19th century.

There is a wine list with 500 wines. The restaurant has a Champagne cart with four wines available by the glass. During brunch, guests can order bottomless rosé by the glass. The wine list has the largest selection of French wine in Las Vegas. The wine has been awarded a Wine Spectator Restaurant Award for its wine list every year since 2015.

The restaurant also has its own French beer.

== Reception ==
Bardot Brasserie has a 4.5 out of 5 rating from Zagat. USA Today named it one of the top ten best restaurants on the Las Vegas Strip and one of the top ten French restaurants in Las Vegas. Gayot rates Bardot Brasserie 15 out of 20.
