= Il Fornaio =

Italian restaurant chain in the United States

- Type: Private
- Industry: Restaurants
- Founded: 1972; 54 years ago in Barlassina, Lombardia, Italy
- Founder: Larry Mindel (founded restaurant concept in 1986)
- Headquarters: Corte Madera, California, United States
- Number of locations: 22
- Area served: United States
- Key people: Ronald Joseph (RJ) Thomas Jr. (CEO)
- Products: Italian cuisine
- Services: Fine dining restaurant
- Revenue: US$120 million (2000)
- Website: www.ilfornaio.com

Il Fornaio is a chain of twenty (as of 2019) Italian-themed fine dining restaurants operating primarily in California (16 locations of its 20) in the United States.

== History ==
The Il Fornaio brand was established in 1972 as a baking school in Barlassina, Lombardia, Italy. It opened a retail bakery in Milan in 1975, and was licensed in 1981 to Williams-Sonoma, Inc. as a retail bakery concept. Williams-Sonoma opened four locations in California before selling the business to private investors in 1983. Initially unsuccessful, the chain was re-sold in 1986 to Larry Mindel, who had run local restaurant holding company Spectrum Foods and launched or bought a series of successful restaurants: Chianti in Los Angeles; Prego (one of the originators of California-style pizza), MacArthur Park and Ciao in San Francisco and Guaymas in Tiburon.

The new owners opened a total of 11 restaurant-bakeries in California in late 1980s and 1990s. The first restaurant location and headquarters are in Corte Madera, California, the second in San Francisco. They then branched out to Las Vegas, Nevada, Colorado, Seattle, and Virginia, opening a total of 22 by 2008.

In 1997 the company became publicly traded on the NASDAQ stock exchange. By 2000 the company had $124 million annual revenues. The company was eventually taken private again in a leveraged buyout. Mindel sold most of his equity and retired from daily operations of the group in 2001 (his son, Michael, continued and is Senior Vice President of Marketing as of 2014), and in 2003 opened Poggio at the Casa Madrona Hotel in Sausalito as a personal project.

Under the direction of Executive Chef Maurizio Mazzon, a native of Venice, the company launched a second concept, Canaletto Ristorante Veneto, at the Venetian in Las Vegas in 1999, with a second location in 2008 in Fashion Island shopping mall in Newport Beach, California however the Newport location closed in 2022.

“Il Fornaio, an upscale Italian restaurant chain, will pay $3 million to settle a lawsuit alleging it created a sexually hostile work environment and retaliated against female employees, many of whom were teenagers.”

== Description ==
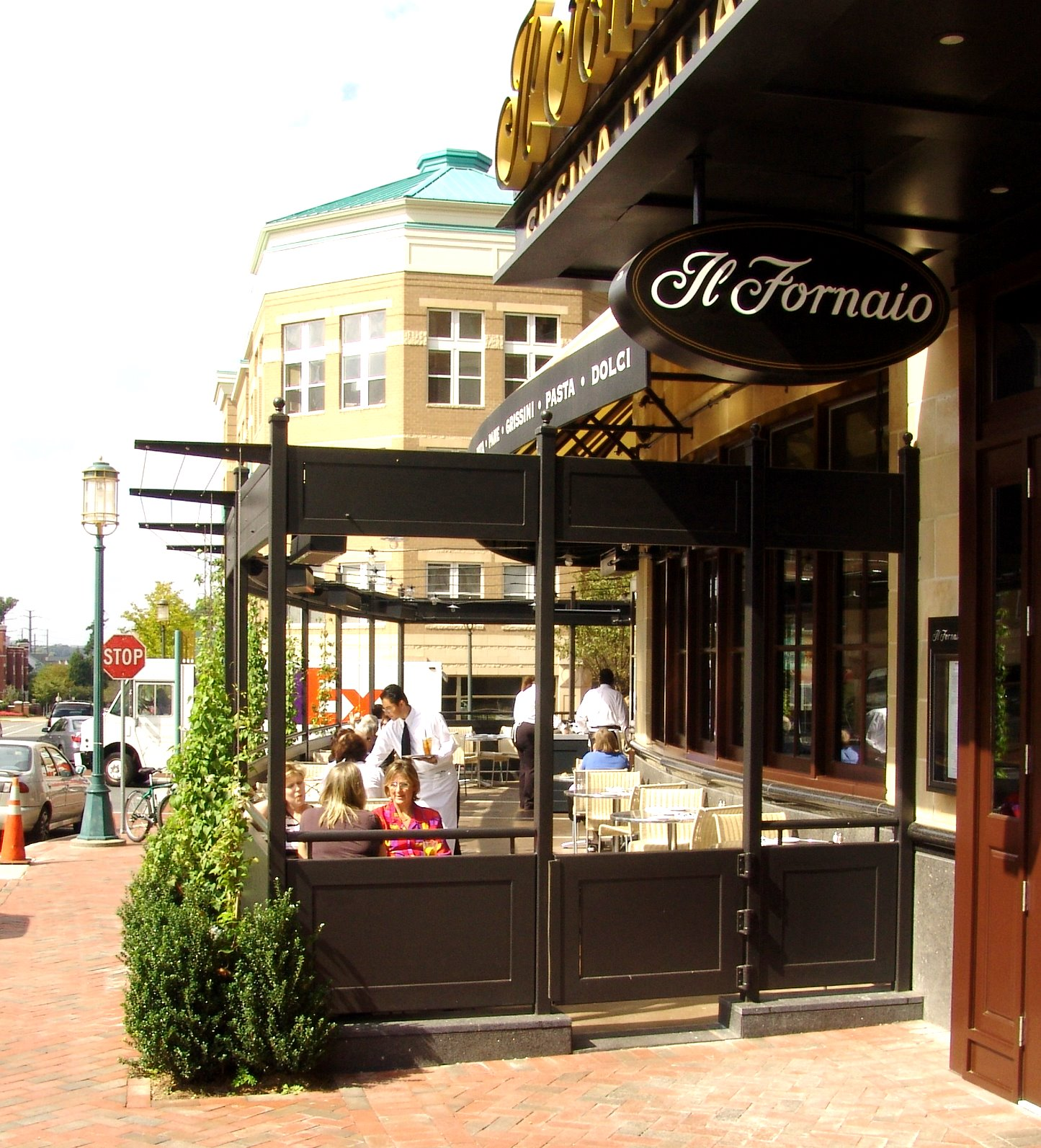
Il Fornaio in Reston, Virginia

Each restaurant shares a core lunch and dinner menu created collectively by the company's chefs, plus signature dishes and specials at the discretion of each individual chef. Fresh pasta is made in-house daily and all sauces, soups and dressings are made from scratch. Many locations featured wood-fired rotisseries and grills. The restaurants also offer gluten-free menus and an array of vegetarian and vegan offerings. Housemade desserts complete many meals

Overall, the company caters mostly to repeat guests at its 18 locations. Regular customers averaged 12.7 return visits per year (later reported to be 17), considered very high in the industry. The company is known for its long-running "Festa Regionale" loyalty program promotion Two weeks out of every month the restaurants promote dishes from a rotating schedule of Italy's 20 food regions with a special insert. The 10,000 promotion members receive a "passport stamp" from that region if they order one of the items, and those who collect each stamp receive a gift. As an unintended benefit, the promotion became a vehicle for recruiting cooks and chefs, after tourism offices in Italy noticed the promotion and established relationships with the company.
