= Black Tap =

American burger restaurant chain

Coordinates: 40.75014°N 73.98599°W

Black Tap Craft Burgers & Beer
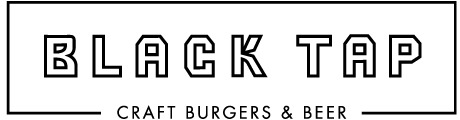

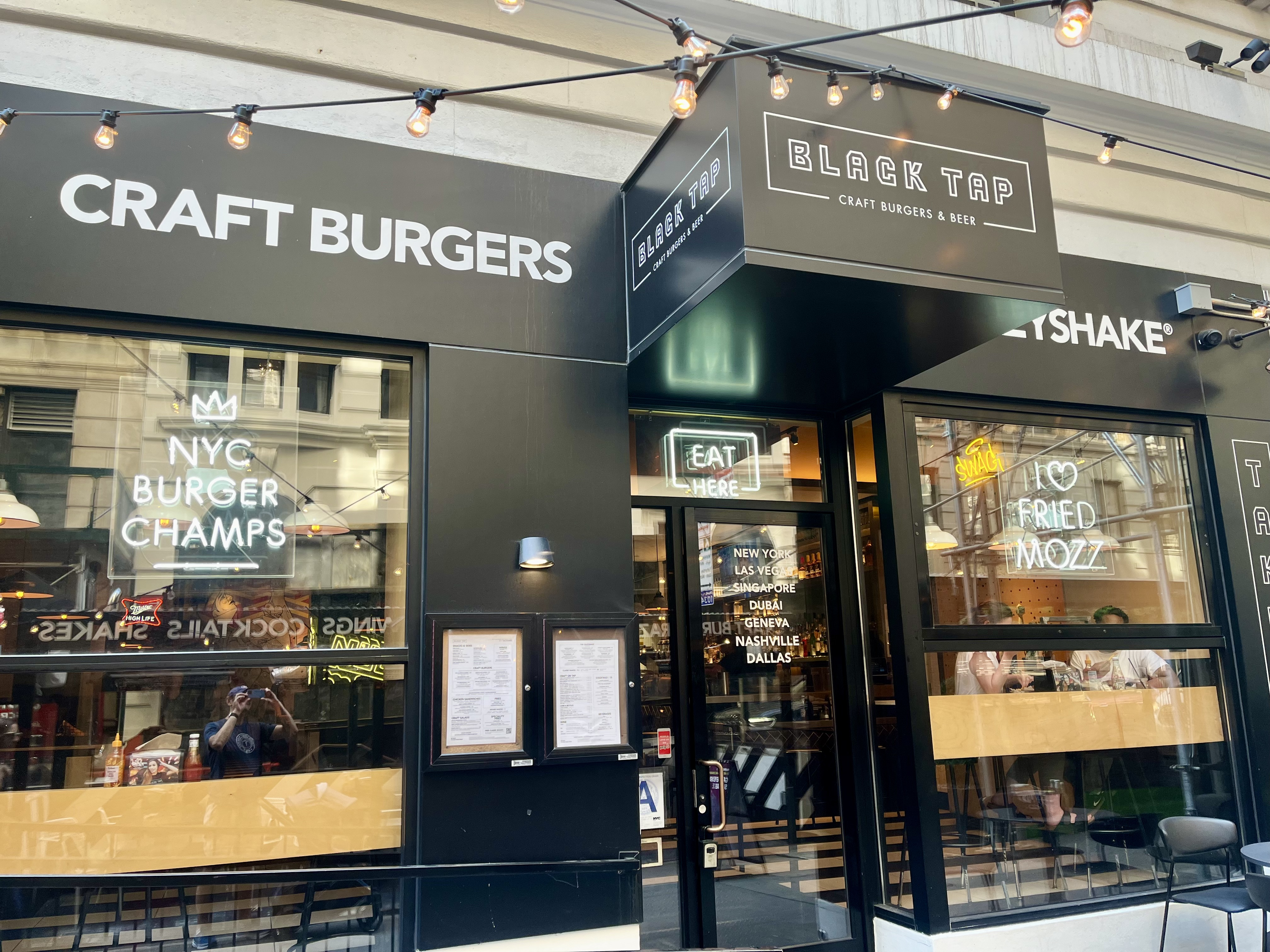
- The 35th Street location in New York City
- Type: Private
- Industry: Fast casual restaurant
- Founded: New York City (2015; 11 years ago)
- Founder: Chris Barish
- Number of locations: 13
- Website: blacktap.com

Black Tap Craft Burgers & Beer is an international gourmet burger restaurant chain run by restaurateur Chris Barish. The name Black Tap is a reference to Craft Beers where Black Tap handles are a mainstay.

Black Tap was founded in 2015 as a 15-seater in New York City by restaurateur Chris Barish, son of Planet Hollywood founder and film producer Keith Barish. The restaurant featured creatively-decorated milkshakes, In 2016, Black Tap received Time Out magazine's People's Choice award for 'Best Burger'.

Black Tap locations are in New York City's Midtown, Soho, and Herald Square neighborhoods, Las Vegas, Anaheim, Singapore, Dallas, Geneva, Zürich, Dubai, Kuwait, Abu Dhabi, Bahrain, Erbil, and Saudi Arabia.

In May 2023, Black Tap opened a new location in Nashville and won Nashville Scene's Best Burger award.

Black Tap is known for their unique milkshakes called "Crazyshakes®" which Black Tap owns the trademark for. Flavors include Cookies 'N Cream Supreme, Strawberry Shortcake, The Cakeshake® among other locally crafted shakes for each local market.

Celebrities who have endorsed Black Tap Burgers include The Weeknd, Joe Jonas, Kate Hudson, and Katie Holmes.

== Awards ==
In 2015, Black Tap won the People's Choice Award at New York City Wine & Food Festival's Burger Bash

== International Expansion ==
In 2018, Black Tap opened in Singapore. In order to maintain strict quality control standards, they continued to import US beef for its burgers and import candies from the United States.
