= Picasso (restaurant) =

Coordinates: 36.11388°N 115.1745°W

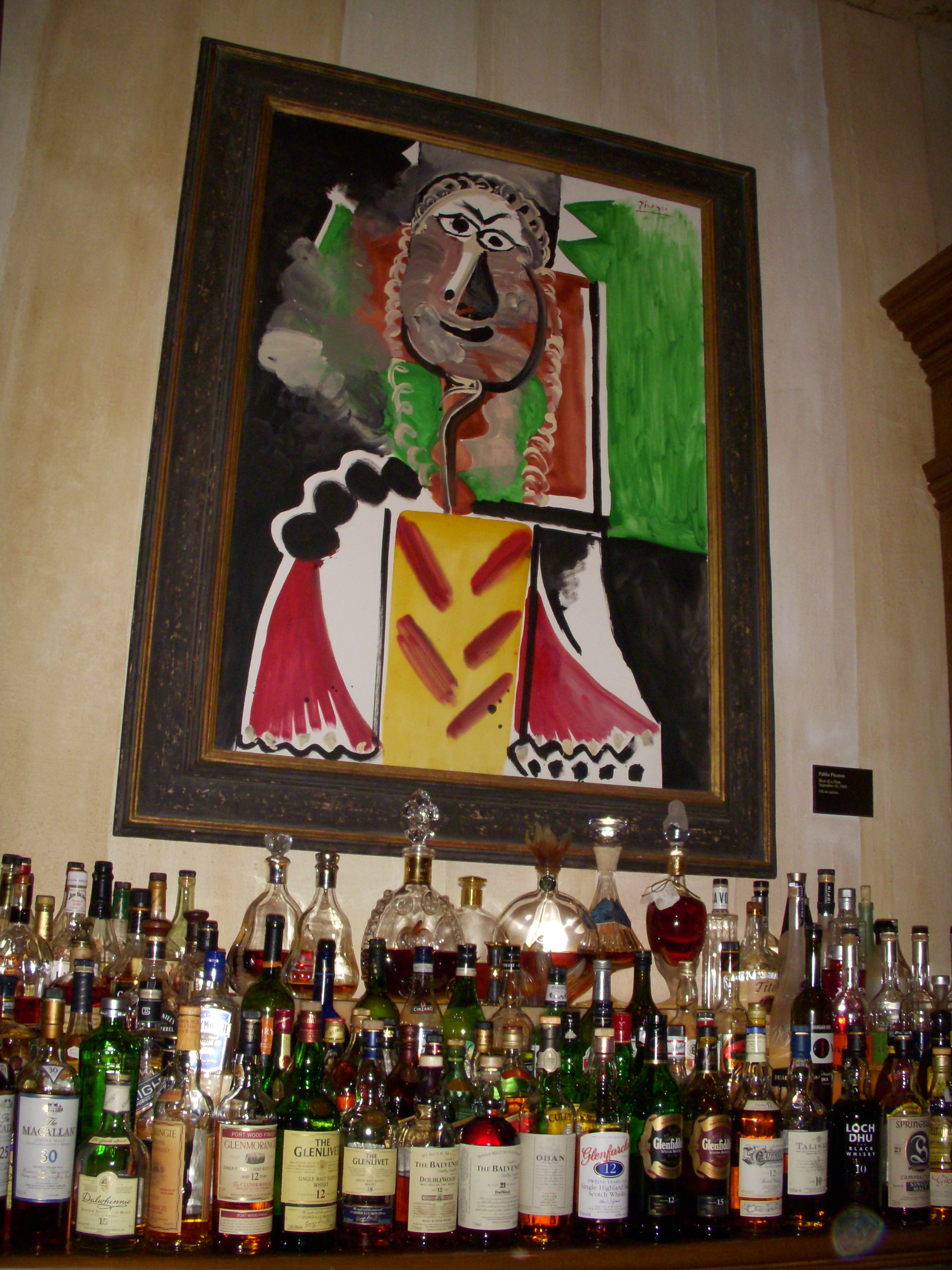
- The restaurant is known for its elaborate floral arrangements and paintings.
- Interactive map of Picasso

Restaurant information
- Established: 1998
- Closed: August 2024
- Owner: Julian Serrano
- Head chef: Julian Serrano
- Food type: French cuisine influenced by Spanish molecular gastronomy
- Dress code: Jacket requested
- Location: 3600 Las Vegas Boulevard South (Bellagio), Paradise, Nevada, 89109, United States
- Website: www.bellagio.com/restaurants/picasso.aspx

Picasso was a restaurant run by chef Julian Serrano in Las Vegas, Nevada, United States. The name is derived from the artist Pablo Picasso and features the artist's paintings throughout the restaurant. The cuisine of Picasso was French with a Spanish influence, and the restaurant was known for its reinvention and interpretation of these cuisines. The restaurant held the Forbes Five-Star Award, the AAA Five-Diamond Award, a 28/30 rating from the Zagat guide, the Wine Spectator Grand Award since 2001, and was considered to be one of the finest restaurants in the United States.

On May 15, 2024, Bellagio announced that Picasso would close in August 2024. It was replaced by Carbone Riviera.

== Awards and accolades ==
- 1998-2017: AAA Five-Diamond Award (Note: "Bellagio won the AAA Five Diamond Award for its Picasso restaurant as well as for its hotel ...")
- 2002: Best Chef: Southwest, Winner, James Beard Foundation Award
- 2008, 2009: Michelin Two Stars
- 2013: Outstanding Wine Service, Finalist, James Beard Foundation Award

== In popular culture ==
- Picasso was a filming location for the 2001 film Ocean's Eleven.

== See also ==
- List of restaurants in the Las Vegas Valley
- List of Michelin-starred restaurants in Las Vegas
