= Newberry Plaza =

Skyscraper in Chicago, Illinois

- Interactive map of the Newberry Plaza area

General information
- Type: Residential and Commercial
- Location: 1000-1050 North State Street
- Coordinates: 41.9016°N 87.6289°W
- Completed: 1973
- Management: Sudler

Height
- Roof: 553 ft (169 m)

Technical details
- Floor count: 57

Design and construction
- Architects: Gordon and Levin

Newberry Plaza is a 553-foot (169 m) full amenity luxury skyscraper located in the heart of the affluent Gold Coast neighborhood of Chicago, Illinois. It was named after the Newberry Library that once operated at its location. The complex was completed in 1973 and has 57 floors above ground. Gordon and Levin designed the building, which is the 56th tallest in Chicago. When Newberry Plaza was completed it was the sixth-tallest all-residential skyscraper in the world and the first highrise in the city to have townhomes built on top of a building's pedestal, known as the Skyhomes. The property also contains commercial space under the condominium tower (1050 N State). Former famous businesses include the original location of Morton's The Steakhouse, the opulent restaurant Arnie's, exclusive nightclub Zorine's, both also owned by the Morton family, the Grotto, and Trader Vic's. In addition to its astonishing views of the city, it might be best known for its prominent location as the only residential high-rise building in a well known triangle of high end restaurants on the East and Oak Street on the South.

== See also ==
- List of tallest buildings in Chicago
