= Julian Serrano =

Spanish chef

- Born: Madrid, Spain
- Education: Escuela Gastronomie P.P.O., Marbella, Spain
- Culinary career
- Cooking style: Mediterranean, French, Spanish, Molecular gastronomy
- Previous restaurant: Picasso (Bellagio, Las Vegas; 1998-2024); Julian Serrano Tapas (ARIA, Las Vegas; 2010-2025); LAGO (Bellagio, Las Vegas; 2015-2024); LAGO (Bellagio, Shanghai; 2018-2024)

Julian Serrano is a Spanish chef who lives and works in the United States. He first gained attention in San Francisco and was later active in Las Vegas until his 2025 retirement.

== Biography ==
A native of Madrid, Serrano is a graduate of the Escuela Gastronomie P.P.O. hotel management school in Marbella, Spain. He has spent time at Lucas-Carlton in Paris, Hotel de France in Auch, France, Chez Max in Zurich and L’Aubergine in Munich. He worked in several restaurants, Caribbean cruise liners, Nashville and San Francisco.

Following brief positions in Miami and Nashville, Serrano moved to San Francisco, where in 1983 he helped open Masa's under the guidance of Masataka Kobayashi.

In 1998, Serrano brought his Mediterranean-French cooking to Bellagio in Las Vegas as Executive Chef of Picasso. Serrano also has a restaurant at Aria named after him serving tapas and other Spanish food, as well as molecular gastronomy.

In April 2015, he opened LAGO at the Bellagio.

In May 2024, Serrano announced his upcoming retirement and that Picasso will be closing in August 2024.

== Restaurants ==
- Picasso, Las Vegas, Nevada. 1998 - closed 2024.
- Julian Serrano Tapas, Las Vegas, Nevada. 2010 - closed 2025.
- LAGO, Las Vegas, Nevada. 2015 - No longer affiliated with Serrano as of 2024.
- LAGO, Shanghai, China. 2018 - No longer affiliated with Serrano as of 2024.

== Awards ==
- Two-time winner of the James Beard Foundation Award (Best Chef Pacific 1998 & Best Chef Southwest 2002).
- Julian Serrano Tapas was noted as one of Esquire Magazine's "20 Best New Restaurants in 2010".
- Julian Serrano Tapas received the Best of Award of Excellence from Wine Spectator Magazine in 2011.
- Picasso, the Michelin Guide two-star restaurant (2008-2009)
