= Michael Mina =

American chef (born 1969)

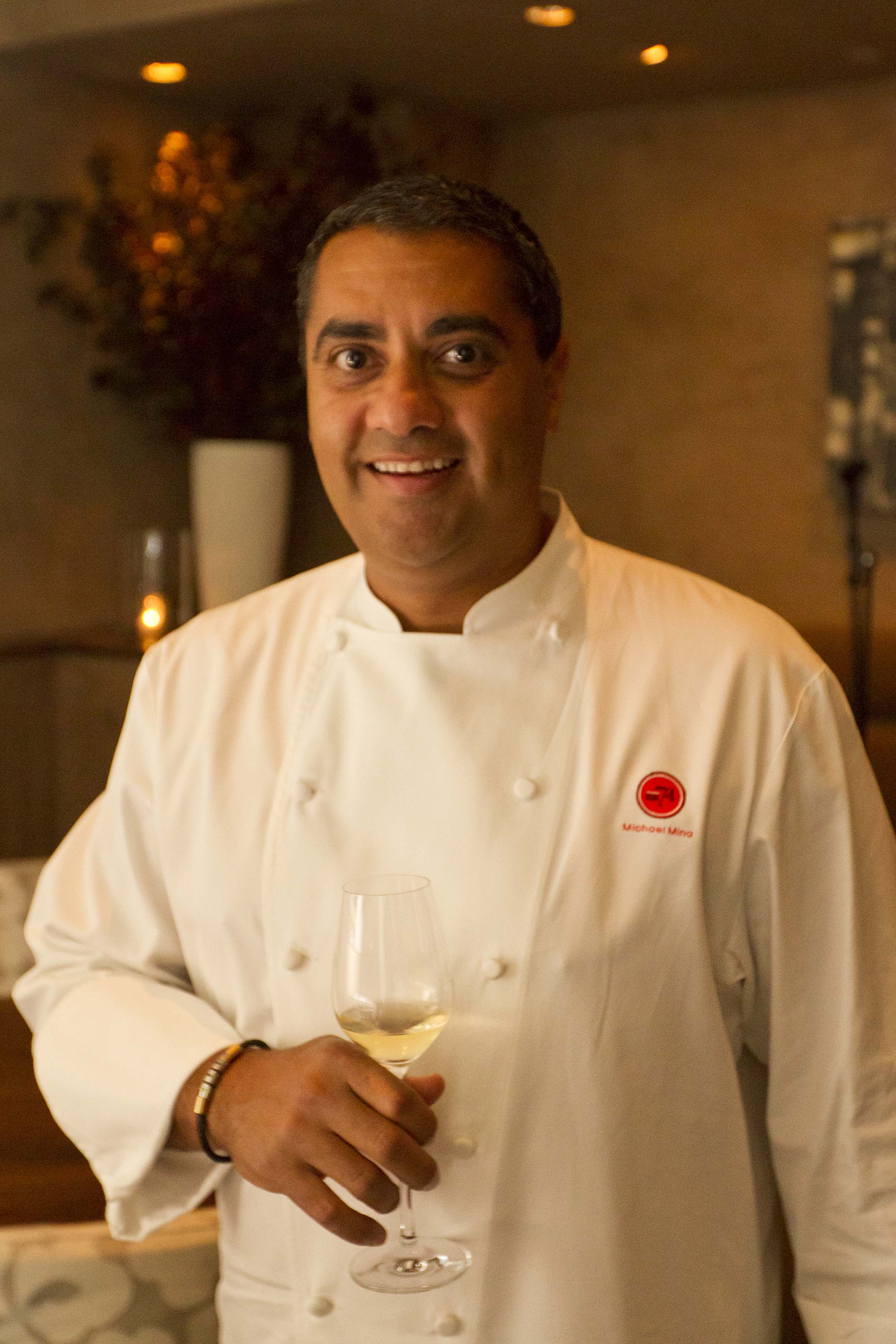
- Mina in 2011
- Born: 1969 (age 56–57); Cairo, Egypt
- Education: The Culinary Institute of America, Hyde Park, New York
- Culinary career
- Cooking style: Modern American, Seafood, Mediterranean
- Rating(s): Michael Mina (San Francisco); Michelin stars; Mobil Michael Mina Bellagio (Las Vegas, Nevada); Michelin stars; Mobil; AAA Motor Club
- Website: http://www.michaelmina.net

Michael Mina (Arabic: مايكل مينا; born 1969) is an Egyptian-American celebrity chef, restaurateur, and cookbook author. He is the founder of the Mina Group, a restaurant management company operating over 40 restaurants worldwide. He is the executive chef at his two namesake restaurants in San Francisco and Las Vegas, which each have earned a star in the Michelin Guide. He authored his first cookbook in 2006 and has made numerous television appearances.

== Early life and education ==
Michael Mina was born in 1969 in Cairo, Egypt. He immigrated to the United States when he was young and was raised in Ellensburg, Washington.

Mina started working in a French kitchen in his hometown when he was 16. After high school, Mina attended the University of Washington and worked in the restaurant at the Space Needle, where he received his first exposure to working in a busy restaurant. He left after one year to attend Culinary Institute of America in Hyde Park, New York.

== Career ==
After attending the Culinary Institute of America, he worked at Tribeca Grill and Aureole restaurants in New York City. He worked in Los Angeles at the Bel Air Hotel with Executive Chef George Morrone. Mina followed Morrone to San Francisco in 1990 to help with Aqua. Following Morrone's departure from Aqua, Mina became executive chef and received numerous awards and accolades.

Michael Mina's approach to cooking revolves around balancing four basic elements: spice, sweetness, acidity, and richness.

Michael Mina has cooked for three United States Presidents.

In 2002, Michael Mina met Andre Agassi in Mina's restaurant in San Francisco; they partnered to start The Mina Group and open concept restaurants such as Nobhill Tavern and Seablue in Las Vegas.

In 2009, Mina opened RN74 in San Francisco, which was named for Route Nationale 74, the highway that passes through France's Burgundy region.

In September 2012, Michael Mina launched Cook Taste Eat, a digital culinary media company that delivers video content through daily emails and videos. Alongside co-host Michelle Branch, Michael Mina teaches viewers how to prepare restaurant-quality meals in their kitchen. Through daily emails and videos, viewers learn each meal one dish at a time, along with useful behind-the-scenes culinary tips and tricks.

In 2018, he opened Mina Brasserie in the DIFC financial district of Dubai.

Michael Mina is married to Diane Mina, who has her own line of Bloody Mary Mixes

In 2021, Mina was named by Carnegie Corporation of New York as an honoree of the Great Immigrants Award.

In 2024, Mina had one of his recipes highlighted in the Mercury News as a Super Bowl recipe.

== Michael Mina (San Francisco) ==
In October 2006, Mina's San Francisco restaurant, Michael Mina, was awarded two Michelin stars, one of only four restaurants in the San Francisco Bay Area to be a two-star recipient. For the 2010 San Francisco Bay Area Michelin Guide, Mina's San Francisco restaurant, Michael Mina, was demoted to one Michelin star, then it was excluded altogether from the starred list in 2011. For 2012, it returned to the starred list with one Michelin star.

In October 2011, it was awarded Esquire Magazine's Restaurant of the Year. In 2018, the Michael Mina flagship restaurant shifted to include more Middle Eastern food on its menus.

Recipes from International Smoke, his restaurant in San Francisco which he opened with Ayesha Curry, have been featured in publications such as the Mercury News.

== Books ==
In November 2006, Michael Mina released his first cookbook, Michael Mina: The Cookbook. The book presents a number of recipes with his "Trio concept" as well as his "classic" dishes.

Mina's second cookbook My Egypt - Cooking from My Roots ISBN 9780316429788 Hardcover (United States), 10/8/2024.

== Restaurants ==
=== Active restaurants ===
- Taleed. Bab Samhan Hotel, Diriyah, Saudi Arabia
- Michael Mina. Bellagio. Las Vegas, Nevada
- Stripsteak. Mandalay Bay. Las Vegas, Nevada
- Stripsteak Waikiki, Honolulu, Hawaii
- Bungalow Kitchen. Tiburon, California
- Bungalow Kitchen, Long Beach, California
- Bourbon Steak. The Americana at Brand. Glendale, California
- Bourbon Steak. JW Marriott Turnberry Isle Resort & Club, Aventura, Florida
- Bourbon Steak. The Fairmont Scottsdale Princess. Scottsdale, Arizona
- Bourbon Steak. Levi's Stadium, Santa Clara, California
- Bourbon Steak. Midtown, New-York.
- Bourbon Steak. JW Marriott, Nashville, Tennessee
- Bourbon Steak. Waldorf Astoria, Dana Point, California
- Bourbon Steak. Swan and Dolphin Resort, Walt Disney World, Olrando, Florida
- Clock Bar. San Francisco
- Bourbon Steak. Four Seasons Hotel, Washington, DC
- Bourbon Steak. The Westin St Francis, San Francisco
- Mina Brasserie. Four Seasons Hotel DIFC, Dubai
- Wit & Wisdom. Four Seasons Hotel, Baltimore, Maryland
- Wit & Wisdom Sonoma. The Lodge at Sonoma Resort, Autograph Collection, Sonoma, California
- The Handle Bar. Jackson Hole, Wyoming
- Michael Mina Stripsteak. Fontainebleau Hotel, Miami Beach, Florida
- Bardot Brasserie. Aria Resort & Casino. Las Vegas, Nevada
- Mina Test Kitchen, San Francisco, California
- Locale Market, St. Petersburg, Florida
- PABU. San Francisco
- Mina's Fish House. Four Seasons Hotel, Ko’Olina, Oahu
- International Smoke, San Francisco, California
- International Smoke, MGM Grand, Las Vegas, Nevada
- Trailblazer Tavern San Francisco, Salesforce East, San Francisco, California
- Mi Almita, Honolulu, Hawaii
- Prime Grill, Dubai, UAE
- Cal Mare, MGM Springfield, Massachusetts
- Wit & Wisdom, Sonoma, California
- Orla, Regent Santa Monica Beach, Santa Monica, California
- Orla, Mandalay Bay, Las Vegas, Nevada

=== Closed restaurants ===
- Arcadia. San Jose, California (closed, 2019)
- American Fish, Aria Resort & Casino, Las Vegas, Nevada (closed, 2015)
- International Smoke, Houston, Texas (closed)
- Nobhill Tavern, MGM Grand, Las Vegas, Nevada (closed, 2013)
- PABU. Four Seasons Hotel, Baltimore, Maryland (closed, 2014)
- PABU. Boston, Massachusetts (closed, 2020)
- Pub 1842. MGM Grand, Las Vegas, Nevada (closed, 2019 and rebranded as International Smoke)
- RN74. San Francisco, California (closed)
- RN74. Seattle, Washington (closed, 2021)
- Seablue, Borgata, Atlantic City, New Jersey (closed, 2014)
- Seablue, MGM Grand, Las Vegas, Nevada (closed, 2012 and rebranded as Pub 1842)
- Pizza And Burger, Fontainebleau Miami Beach, Florida (closed in 2022 and rebranded as Arcadia Grill)
- Stonehill Tavern. Waldorf Astoria Monarch Beach, Monarch Beach, California (closed 2017, and rebranded as Bourbon Steak)
- International Smoke Del Mar, One Paseo, Carmel Valley, San Diego (closed in 2022)
  - Bourbon Steak. Seattle, Washington (closed 12/31/2023)

== Television appearances ==
- Introduced by Hell's Kitchen show host Gordon Ramsay as a master chef, Michael Mina appeared in episode 208 as a food competition judge. Later, in episode 809, Chef Ramsay and the challenge winners visited his XIV restaurant, but Mina did not appear.
- In 2019, Mina appeared on the "Meze Fete" episode of Guy's Ranch Kitchen (season 2, episode 14) on the Food Network. At Guy Fieri's ranch Mina prepared salmon with a chermoula sauce and labneh, as well as melon with rosewater and pistachios.
- In 2021, Mina appeared as a guest judge in MasterChef (American season 11) in Episode 6.
