= Icrave =

Icrave may refer to:

- Icrave (design firm)
- iCraveTV, a Canadian website which offered streaming Internet broadcasts of conventional television stations

== See also ==
- Crave
