= Aria Resort and Casino =

Resort and casino in Paradise, Nevada, US

Coordinates: 36°6′28.50″N 115°10′37″W

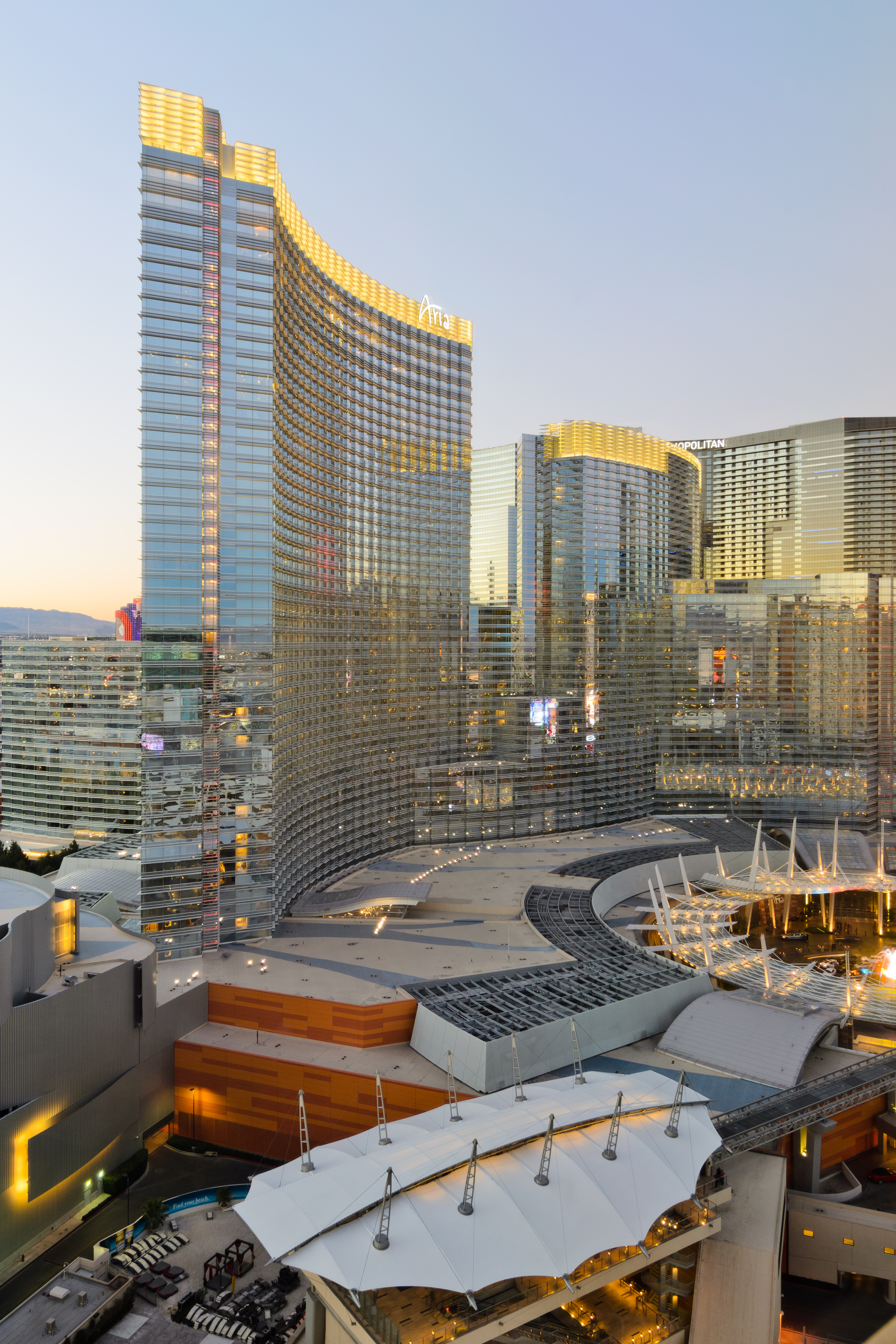
- Aria Resort and Casino seen from above
- Interactive map of Aria Resort and Casino
- Location: Paradise, Nevada, United States; 3730 South Las Vegas Boulevard
- Opened: December 16, 2009; 16 years ago
- No. of rooms: 4,004
- Gaming space: 150,000 sq ft (14,000 m^{2})
- Permanent shows: Viva Elvis (2010–2012); Zarkana (2012–2016)
- Notable restaurants: Bardot Brasserie, Carbone, Catch, Din Tai Fung, Gymkhana, Javier's, Jean-Georges Steakhouse
- Owner: The Blackstone Group
- Operating license holder: MGM Resorts International
- Architect: Pelli Clarke Pelli Architects
- Website: aria.mgmresorts.com/en.html

Aria Resort and Casino is a luxury resort and casino, and the primary property at the CityCenter complex, located on the Las Vegas Strip in Paradise, Nevada. It is owned by The Blackstone Group and operated by MGM Resorts International.

Construction began on June 25, 2006, with a design by Pelli Clarke Pelli Architects. Aria received LEED Gold certification for its environmentally friendly design, and is the largest hotel in the world to achieve such a feat. It was also among the most technologically advanced hotels in the world at the time of its opening on December 16, 2009. It was developed as a joint venture between MGM and Dubai World, before being sold to Blackstone in 2021.

Aria's hotel includes two curvilinear glass towers, rising up to 50 stories. The hotel has 4,004 rooms and suites, and is a recipient of the AAA Five Diamond Award and a five-star rating from Forbes Travel Guide. The resort also includes the only casino at CityCenter, with 150,000 sq ft (14,000 m^{2}) of gaming space. Other features include an 80,000 sq ft (7,400 m^{2}) salon and spa, 500,000 sq ft (46,000 m^{2}) of convention space, and numerous restaurants, as well as artwork and water attractions.

Aria also had CityCenter's only performance theater, until it closed in 2016 for a convention center expansion. The 1,840-seat theater originally hosted Viva Elvis, a show by Cirque du Soleil based on the music of Elvis Presley. It ran from 2010 to 2012, closing due to low ticket sales. Zarkana, a new show by Cirque du Soleil, opened two months later and ran until the theater's closure.

== History ==
Aria is part of the CityCenter project, developed by MGM Mirage (later MGM Resorts International) and Dubai World.

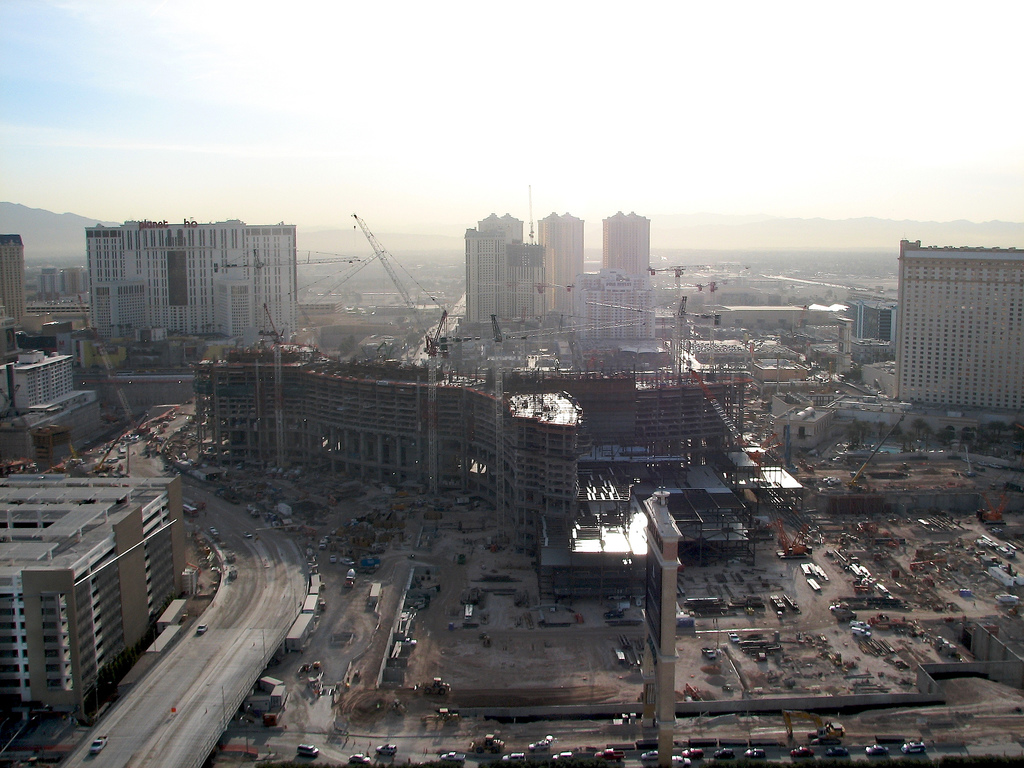
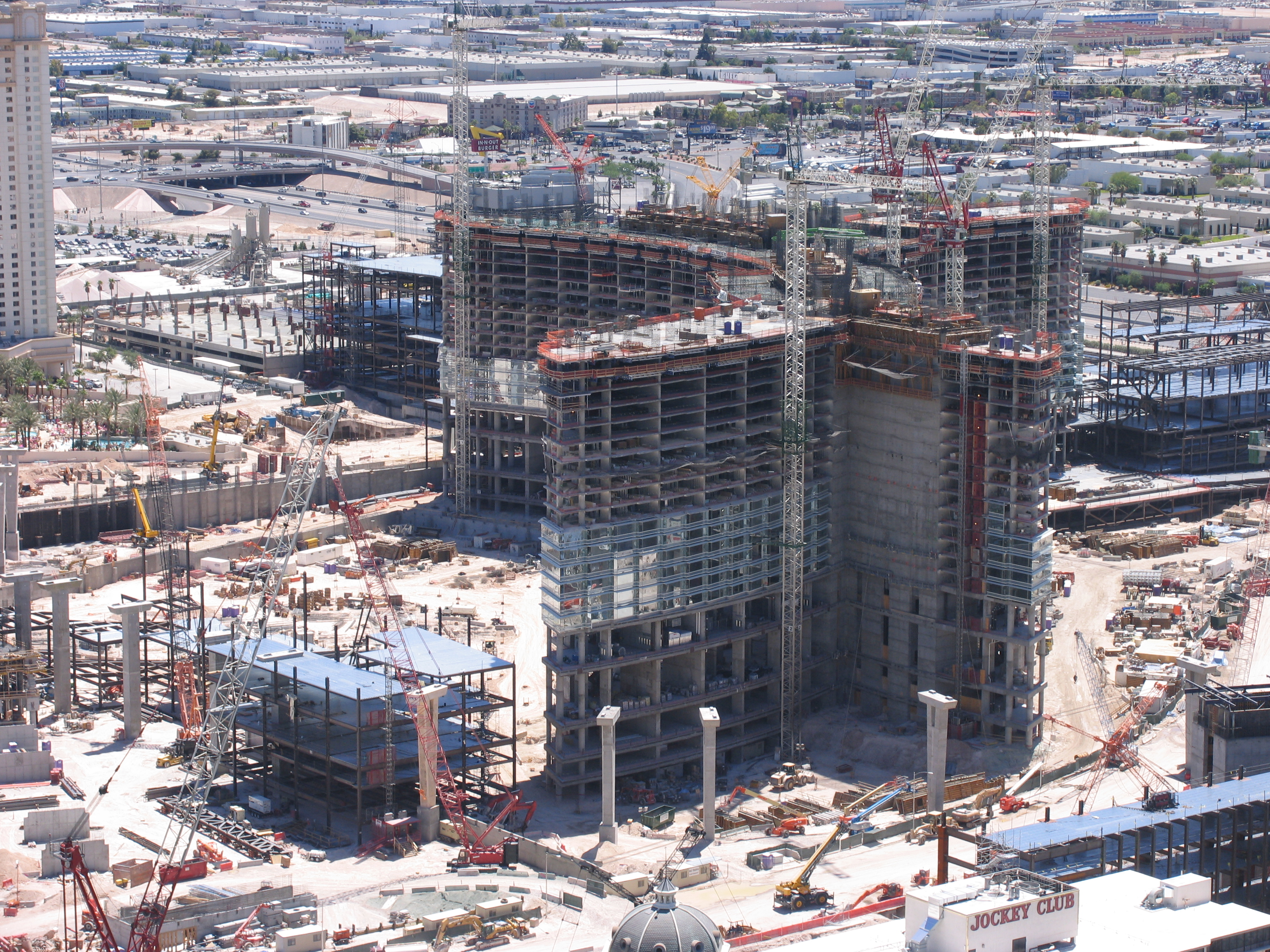
Construction during 2007

Perini Building Company served as general contractor. Construction of CityCenter began on June 25, 2006, with a concrete pour for the project's main resort, unnamed at the time. The "Aria" name, unveiled in May 2008, was inspired by the resort's placement as the central feature of CityCenter, as arias are focal points in operas.

Aria opened on December 16, 2009, at 11:41 p.m., following a two-minute fireworks show. It was the fourth component to open at CityCenter, and is the primary hotel property there.

Aria opened during the Great Recession, which had a negative impact on the resort's revenue. Although it was built as a luxury resort, Aria had to adjust its strategy upon opening and appeal to a lower-income clientele amid the recession. The resort launched a national advertising campaign in 2010.

Aria has been operated by MGM since its opening. In 2021, MGM bought out Dubai World's ownership stake in Aria and the nearby Vdara hotel, gaining full ownership of both. That year, MGM sold the two properties for $3.89 billion in cash to The Blackstone Group, which leased them back to MGM for an annual rent of $215 million.

== Design and technology ==
Aria was designed by Pelli Clark Pelli Architects, which spent two months with MGM discussing the project's design. Aria was the firm's first casino design. Unlike other Las Vegas resorts, Aria does not feature a theme. According to César Pelli, "When you don't have a theme, the attraction of the building has to rest in the beauty of the architecture". The design incorporates natural materials such as foliage, glass, wood, and stone. Real and fake trees are located in numerous resort facilities, including some of the restaurants. Interior designer Peter Marino worked on several areas of the resort, including hotel suites and a high-limit gaming area.

Technology was incorporated in the resort's exterior and interior design, specifically for the reduction of energy consumption. For its environmentally friendly design, Aria received LEED Gold certification, becoming the largest hotel in the world to achieve such a feat. Aria's casino is not included in the Gold certification because it allows cigarette smoking. However, the resort has an advanced air filtration system which eliminates smoke on the casino floor. In addition, blackjack tables had built-in air curtains to deal with smoke and protect dealers. The tables expel air which serves as a barrier between dealers and players.

Upon opening, Aria was among the world's most technologically advanced resorts, with features such as touchscreens located throughout the property, including its convention center and restaurants. Rooms automatically adjust curtains, turn off unused lights and electronics, and regulate the temperature when a guest enters or leaves. In 2010, Aria was described by Popular Mechanics as possibly "the most technologically advanced hotel ever built".

== Features ==
Aria has numerous features spread across 6,074,474 sq ft (564,337.1 m^{2}).

=== Gaming ===
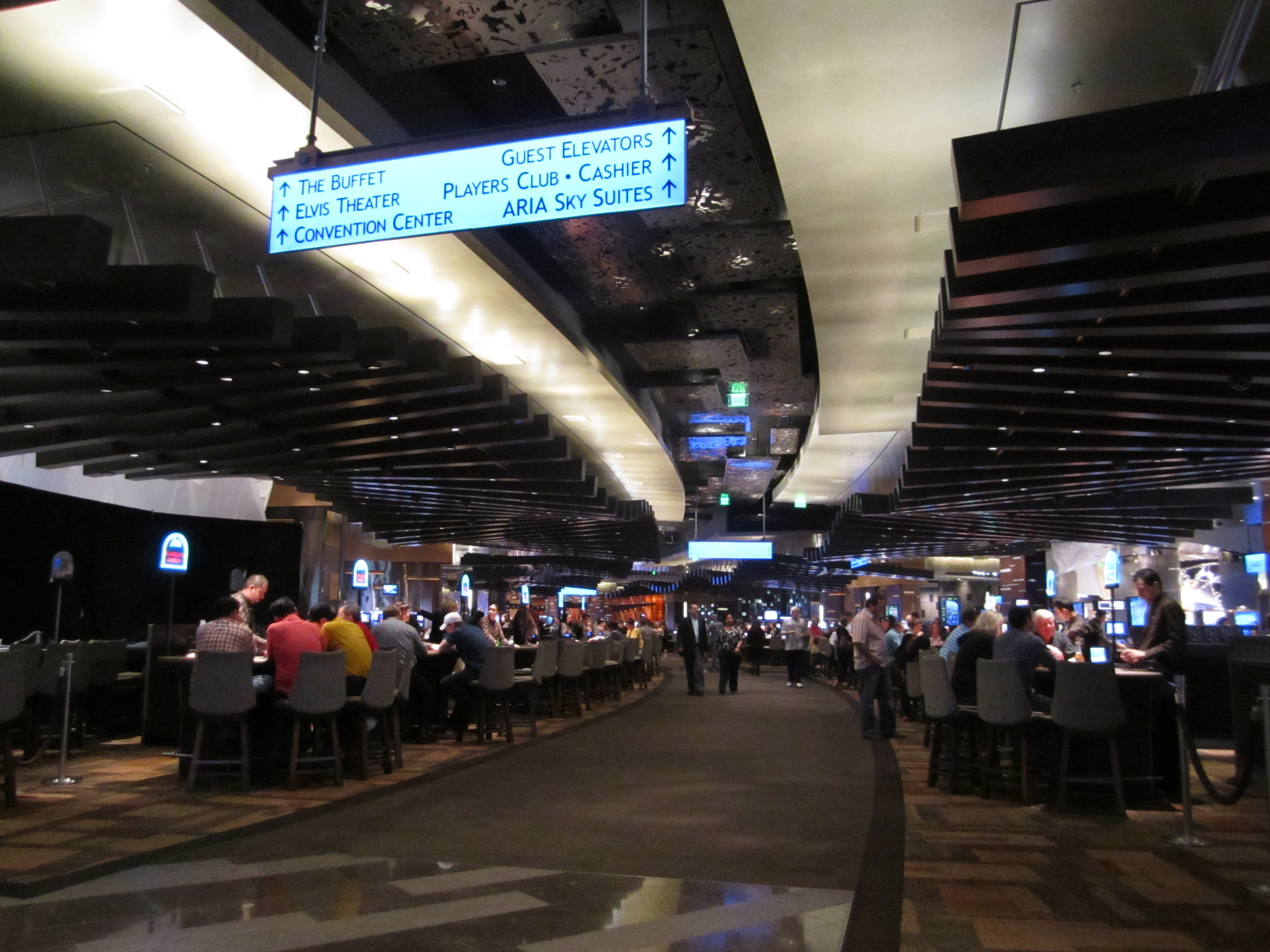
Aria's casino floor

Aria includes the only casino at CityCenter. Its 150,000 sq ft (14,000 m^{2}) of gaming space features slot machines, table games, and a race and sports book. The gaming machines are controlled and monitored by a 3,000 sq ft (280 m^{2}) data center and are changed to play the most popular games based on real-time data collected about the performance of each machine. Exterior windows are present along the edges of the casino floor and skylights are part of the ceiling in the high-limit gaming area, differing from traditional casino design which historically omits natural light.

Aria's poker room contains 24 tables. The Ivey Room, named after poker player Phil Ivey, opened in May 2010 as an exclusive one-table high-limit poker room. It gave high roller players direct access to the cashier's cage and 24-hour table-side dining, and would be the location for the highest stakes games at Aria. In February 2019, it was renamed Table 1.

The Aria poker room also hosts events for the World Poker Tour (WPT). In July 2014, the inaugural WPT500 was held at Aria and attracted 3,599 entrants. It was held around the same time each year until 2019.

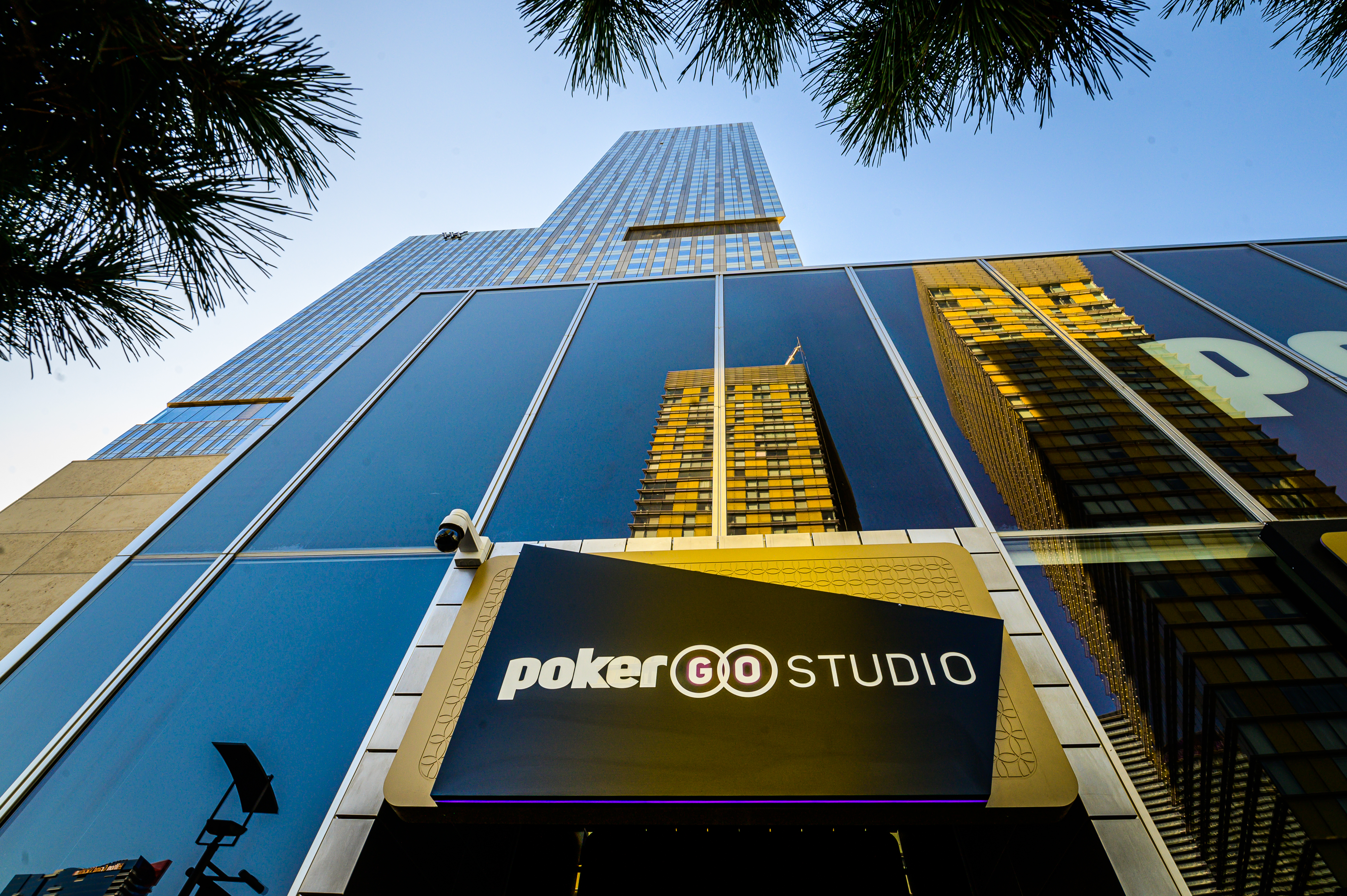
PokerGO Studio entrance

During season 16 (XVI) of the WPT, Aria would host two additional events: the inaugural WPT Bobby Baldwin Classic and the season-ending $25,000 buy-in WPT Tournament of Champions. In season 17 (XVII), the WPT ARIA Summer Championship replaced the WPT Bobby Baldwin Classic.

In May 2018, Poker Central opened the PokerGO Studio at Aria. The 10,000 sq ft (930 m^{2}) facility was built to host live poker events distributed on the poker streaming service PokerGO. Notable poker tournaments and cash games held at the PokerGO Studio include the Super High Roller Bowl, Poker Masters, U.S. Poker Open, Poker After Dark, and High Stakes Poker. The studio is open to the public on an event-by-event basis.

=== Hotel ===
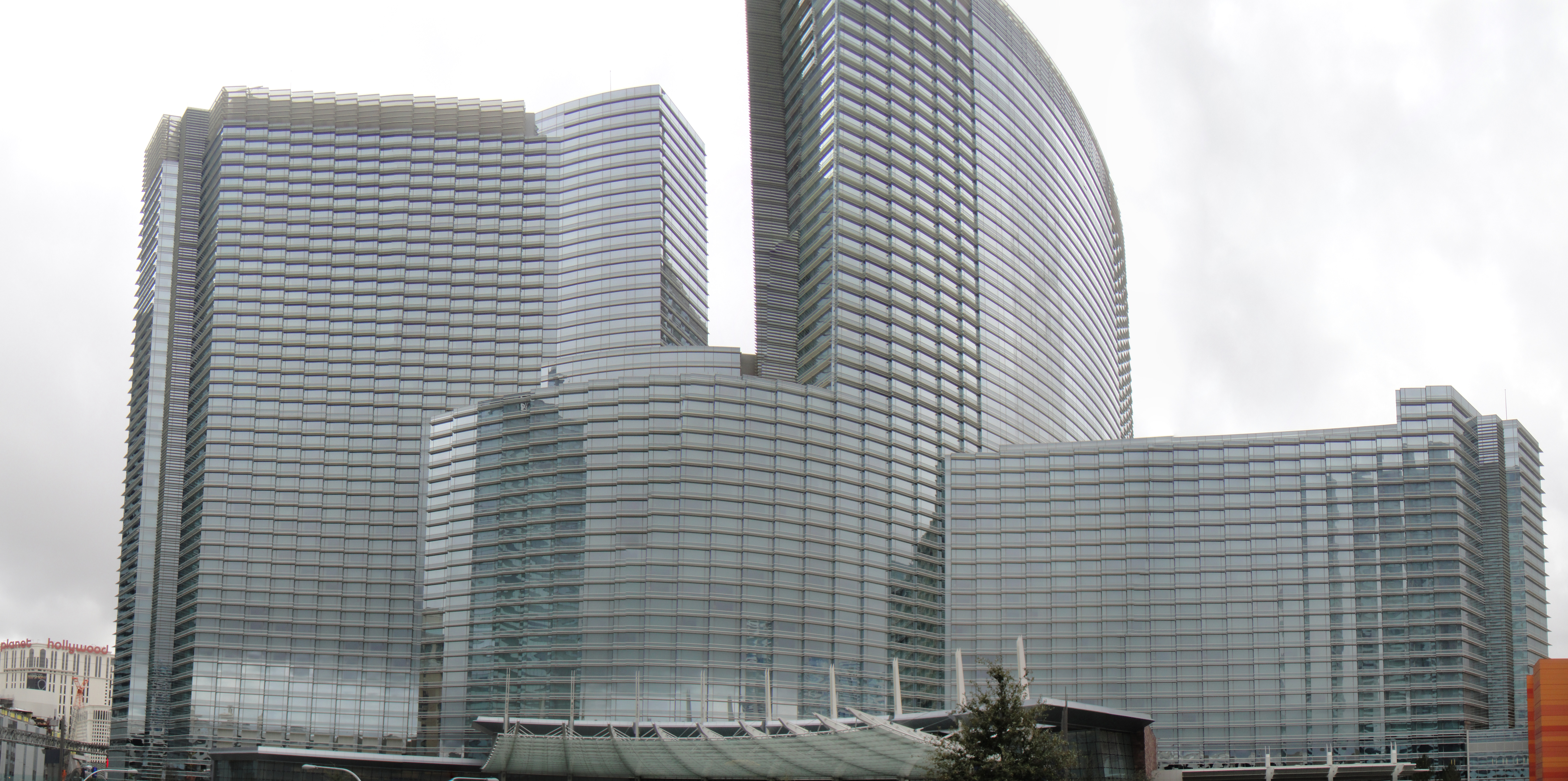
Aria's hotel structures from the west side

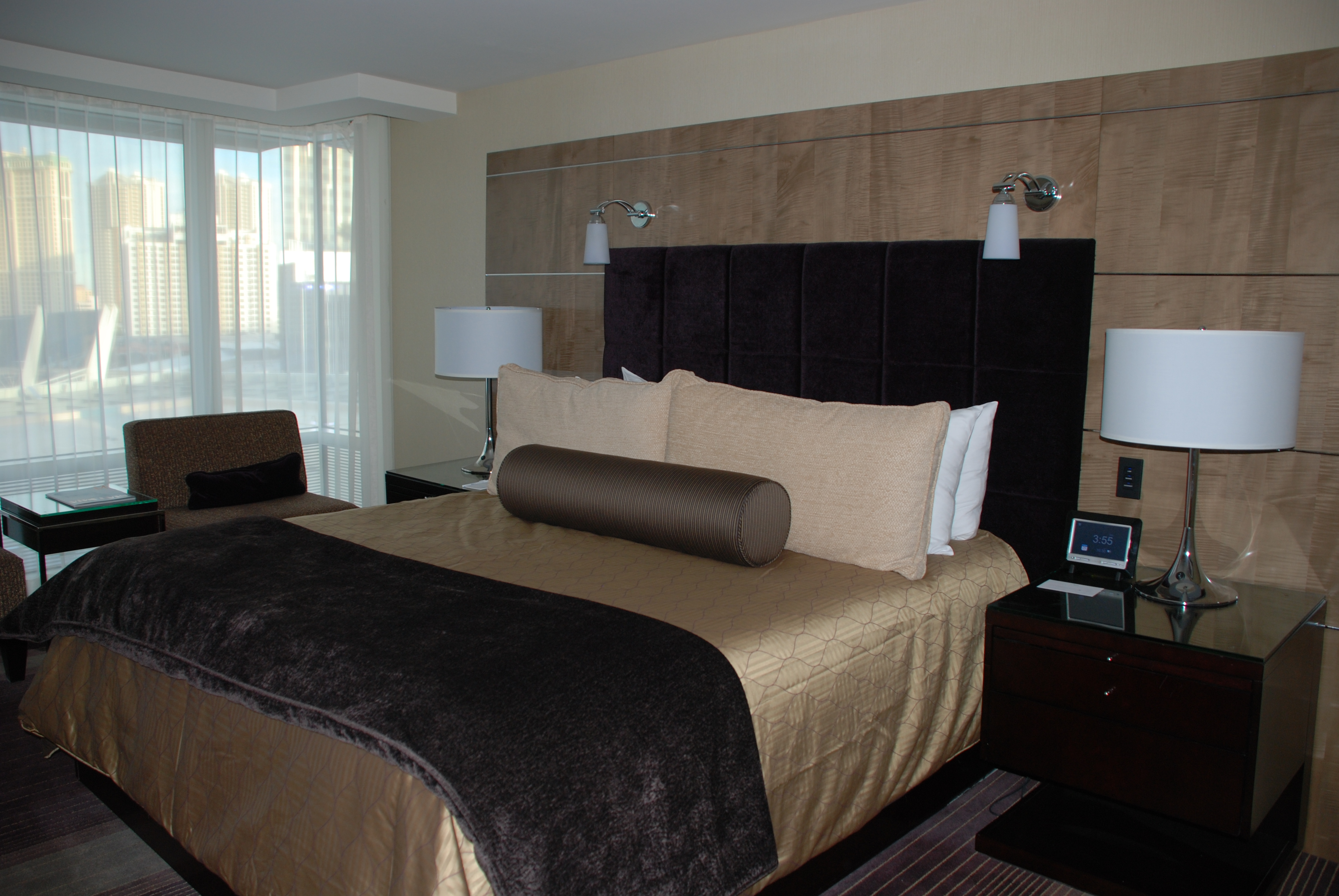
An Aria hotel room

Aria's hotel includes two curvilinear glass towers. The main tower is 50 stories, although the top floor is labeled "61". Because of bad-luck superstitions among gamblers, the tower skips the 13th floor (triskaidekaphobia) and floors 40 through 49 (tetraphobia). The second tower is 10 stories shorter than the main one.

The hotel contains 4,004 rooms, including 568 suites. Based on room count, Aria is among the largest hotels in Las Vegas. Some of its suites are referred to as Sky Suites, ranging in size from 1,050 to 2,060 sq ft (98 to 191 m^{2}). The hotel includes another room category known as Sky Villas, which range from 2,000 to 7,000 sq ft (190 to 650 m^{2}). A renovation of the Sky Suites and Sky Villas was unveiled at the end of 2021.

=== Restaurants ===
Aria opened with more than a dozen restaurants, including Jean-Georges Steakhouse by chef Jean-Georges Vongerichten. It is one of only nine restaurants in the United States that serve genuine Kobe beef. Other restaurants at opening included American Fish by chef Michael Mina, and a Chinese restaurant known as Blossom. Aria also featured Lemongrass, the first Thai cuisine restaurant to be opened on the Strip. Julian Serrano Tapas was a tapas restaurant named after its chef, and Esquire included it among the "20 Best New Restaurants in 2010". It closed in 2025.

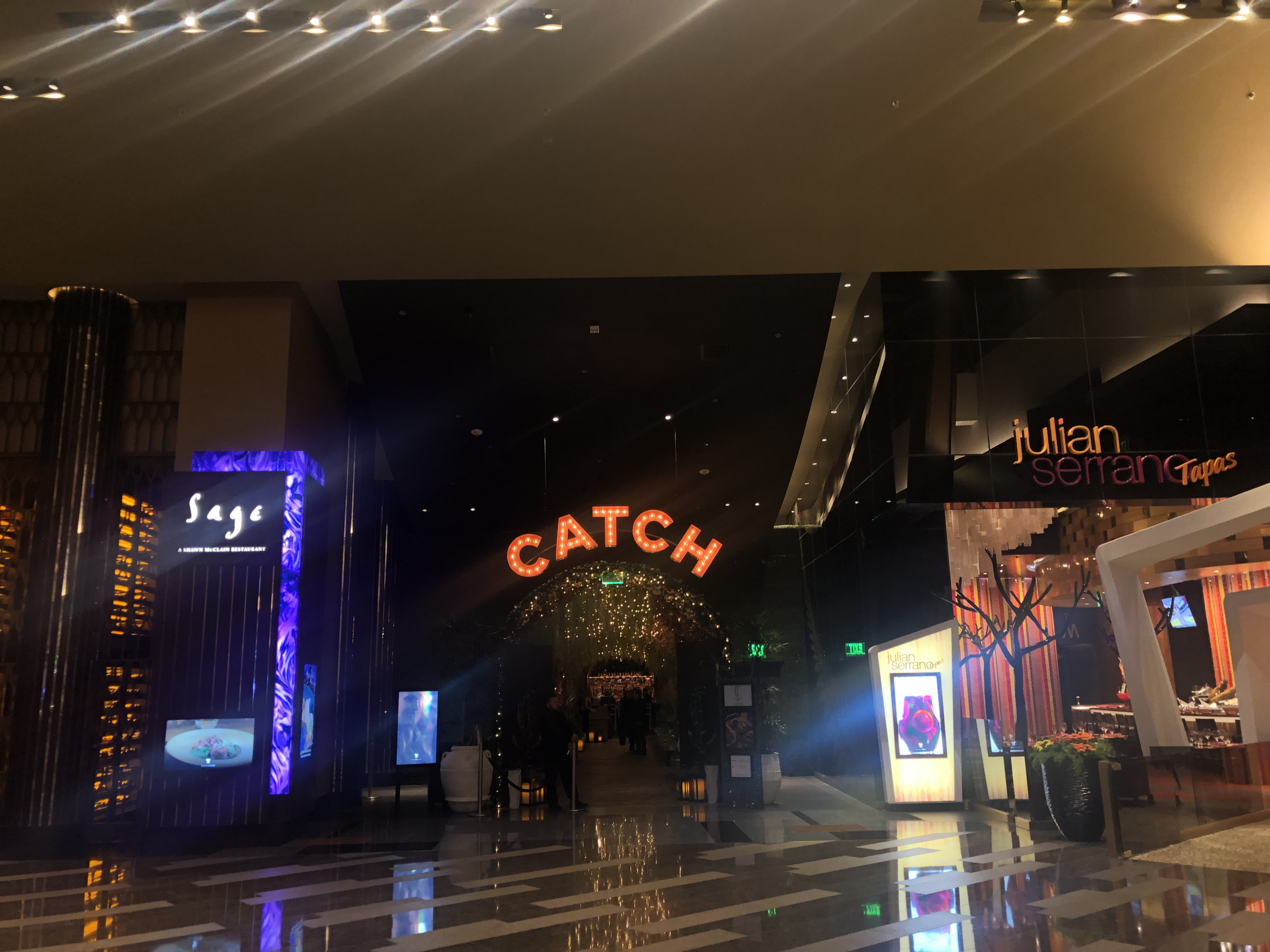
Several restaurants at Aria, including Sage, Catch, and Julian Serrano, seen in 2019

Another restaurant, Sage, featured chandeliers, floor-to-ceiling murals, and a seasonal menu. It was operated by chef Shawn McClain, who also opened Five50 Pizza Bar at the resort in 2013. It was named for its happy hour and the temperature at which its pizza is cooked. McClain departed Aria in 2020. Sage did not reopen, following COVID-19-related closures earlier that year, and Five50 was renamed Moneyline Pizza & Bar. In the former Sage space, Tao Group opened Cathédrale in 2023. The Mediterranean restaurant seats 266 people and was designed by Rockwell Group, with artwork by Vhils. It is the second Cathédrale location, after opening in New York City in 2019.

Masa Takayama oversaw two restaurants, including Bar Masa and Shabu. The latter, also known as Shaboo, operated within Bar Masa. Shaboo closed in 2012 and was replaced by a new restaurant-within-a-restaurant from Takayama. Known as Tetsu, it focused on the teppanyaki style of Japanese cooking. Bar Masa and Tetsu closed in 2018 and were replaced by Catch, a $7 million seafood restaurant opened later that year. Catch is known for drawing celebrities to its New York and Los Angeles locations.

Union Restaurant & Lounge was replaced by a Mexican restaurant, Javier's, in 2012. The restaurant's design includes a canopy made of ropes that hangs over the bar area. Several new restaurants were added in 2015, including Carbone, which serves Italian-American food. Mina opened a French restaurant, Bardot Brasserie, replacing American Fish. Another new restaurant was Herringbone, which served seafood. It closed in 2020 and was replaced by Salt & Ivy Cafe. Din Tai Fung opened its largest U.S. restaurant at Aria in 2020.

Upon its opening, Aria also included a buffet, which proved to be popular. It closed in 2012 for remodeling, before reopening two months later. The buffet had previously featured an abundance of tiling, prompting customer comparisons with a bathroom. Executive chef Shawn Smilie said, "We used to have these tiles everywhere, and people said it reminded them of a shower. That had to change". The remodel replaced most of the tiling with wood and also added brighter colors. The buffet closed in March 2020, due to the COVID-19 pandemic. The 24,000 sq ft (2,200 m^{2}) space reopened in late 2022 as Proper Eats, a food hall with a dozen options, including a pizza restaurant by DJ Steve Aoki.

The resort's food and alcohol are stored in off-site and on-site warehouses.

=== Nightclubs ===
Aria is popular among young adults, particularly for its nightlife. Haze, a 25,000 sq ft (2,300 m^{2}) nightclub, opened with the resort. It was designed by Icrave and operated by The Light Group. Haze included DJs and a 100-foot projection screen. According to Aria president Bobby Baldwin, "Haze was a good nightclub. It wasn’t a great nightclub, and it got to the point where we needed to close it and create a great nightclub".

Haze closed in November 2014, making way for a new nightclub known as Jewel, designed by Rockwell Group and operated by Hakkasan Group. Jewel opened in May 2016. It is small compared to other Las Vegas resort nightclubs, with capacity for 1,923 people. It includes five VIP suites, each with their own theme.

Aria also included the 3,756 square feet (349 m^{2}) Gold Lounge by Cirque du Soleil, built to accompany the resort's Viva Elvis show. Gold Lounge's design was inspired by Graceland, the home of Elvis Presley, and it made extensive use of black and gold in its décor. The lounge doubled as a nightclub with DJs playing a variety of music from different decades. Gold Lounge underwent a $4 million renovation in 2015.

=== Artwork and water attractions ===
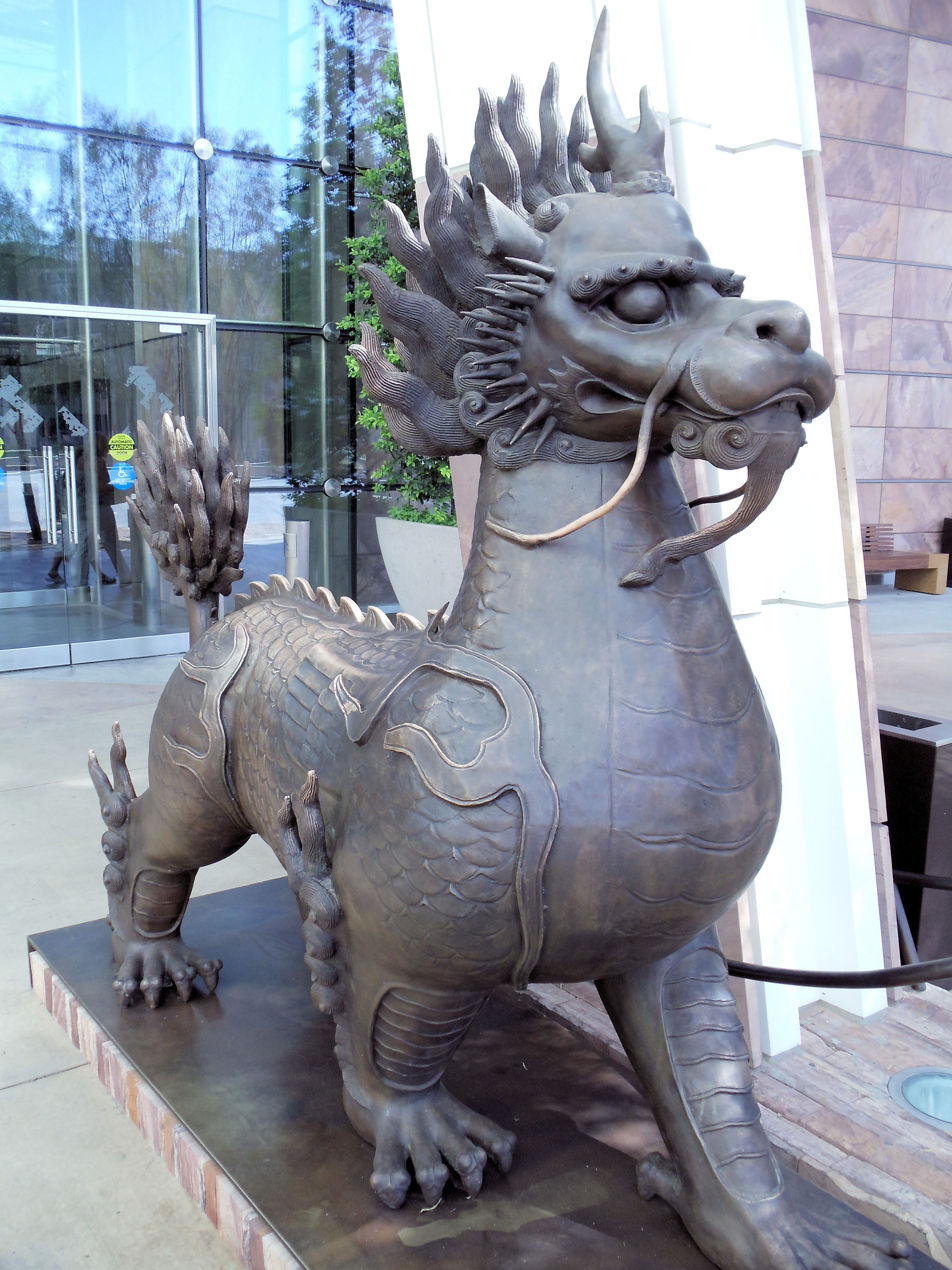
Qilin statue at one of Aria's entrances

Artwork by several artists, including Tony Cragg and Antony Gormley, is located throughout Aria. Hung behind the hotel's check-in desk is Maya Lin's Silver River, a sculpture of the Colorado River. Made of reclaimed silver, it measures 87 ft (27 m) and weighs 3,700 pounds.

Located at the valet area is Vegas, an LED art installation by Jenny Holzer. It measures 280 feet long, 18 feet tall, and features more than 200 "Truisms" by Holzer that scroll by, to be read by guests waiting for their vehicles. Vegas was added to brighten the dark valet space.

Aria features three water attractions designed by WET. A traffic circle is located in front of Aria's south entrance, with a fountain in the center. Known as Lumia, the fountain features programmable water streams which collide with each other, changing colors in the process.

Also located near the south entrance is Focus, a curved water wall made of stone imported from India. At 270 feet long, Focus is one of the largest water walls in the world.

Latisse, an indoor water wall made from a series of glass panels, is located at Aria's north entrance. It was designed by Joel Berman and rises 40 feet.

Gallery of water attractions
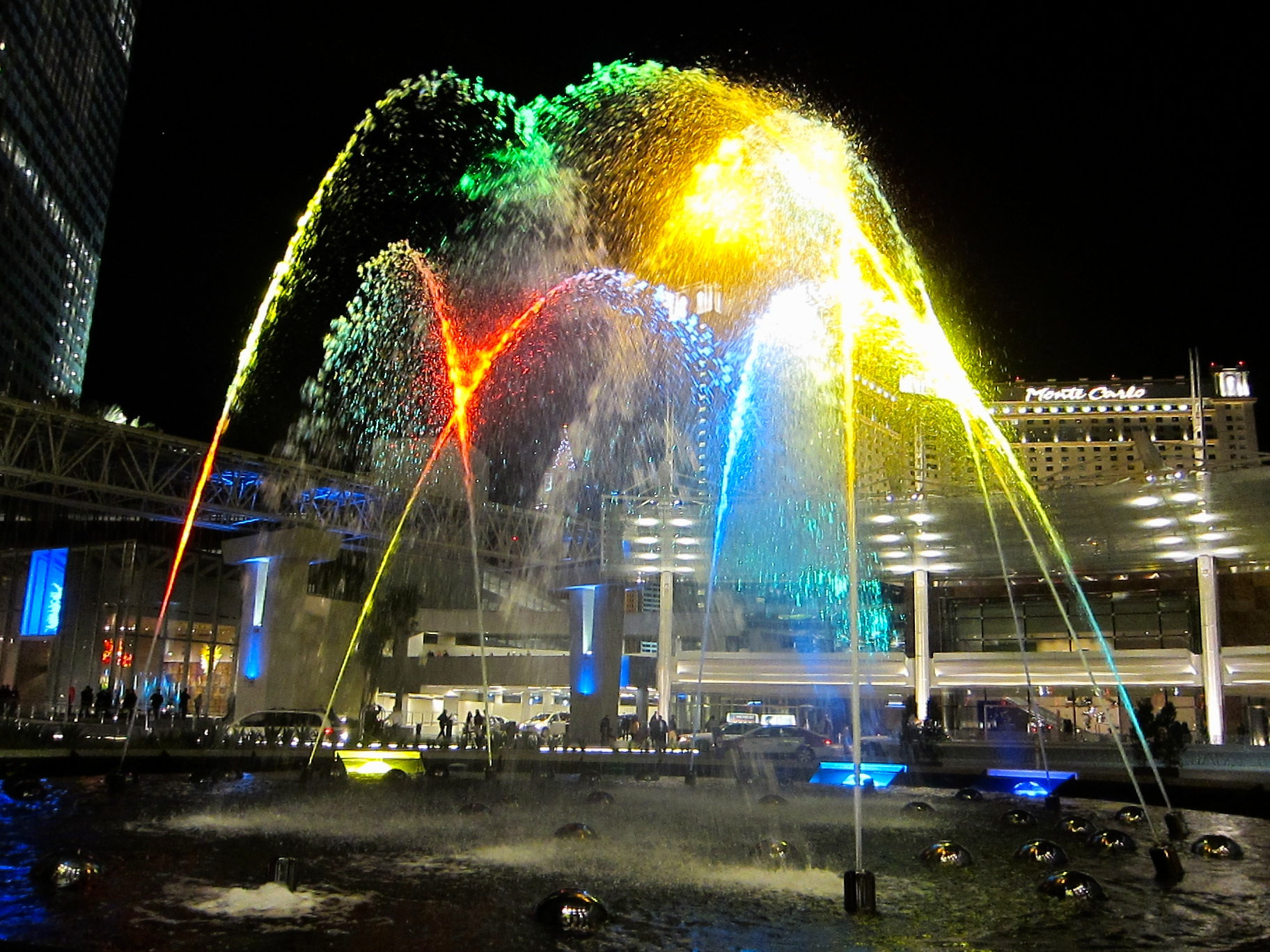
Lumia fountain at night

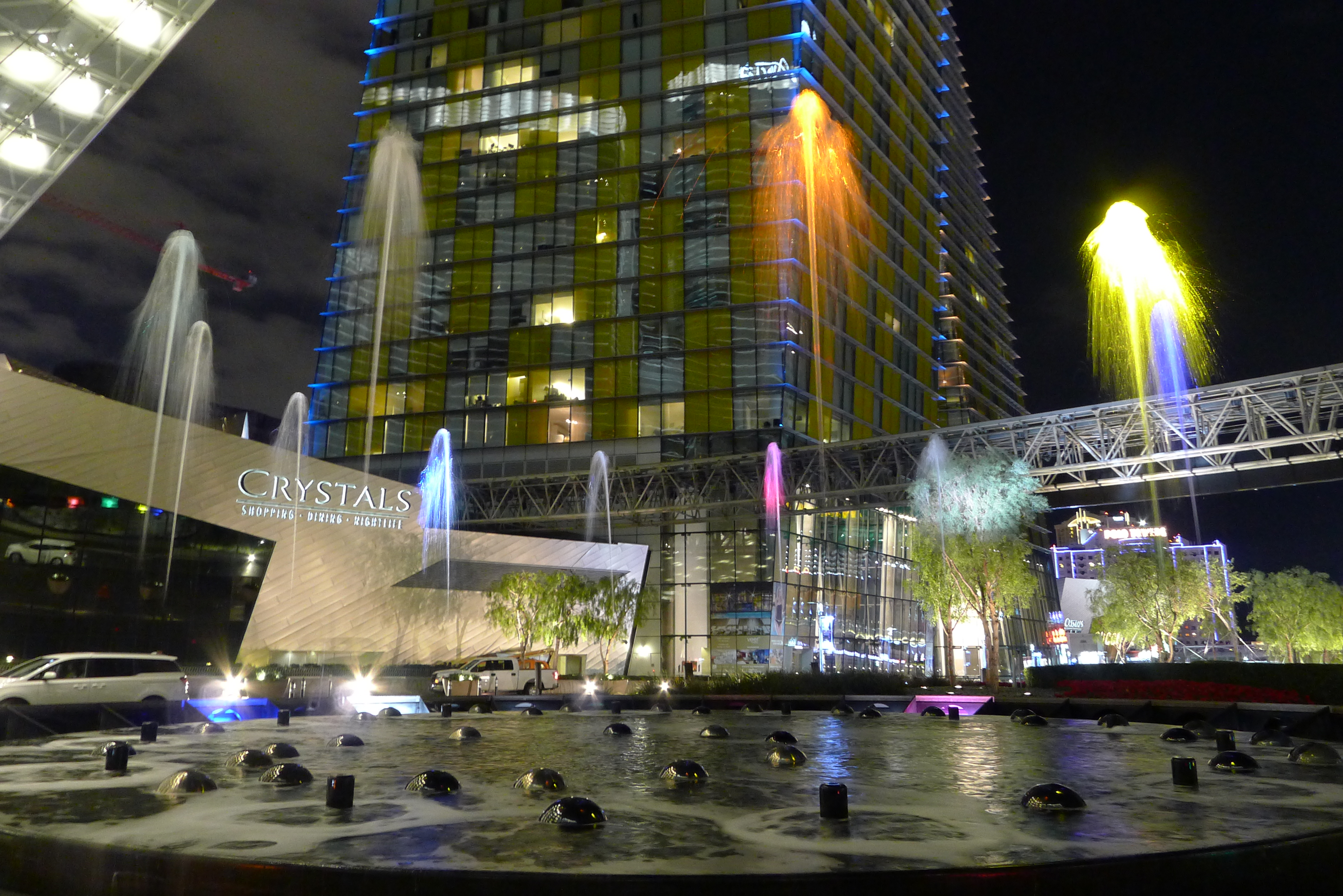
Lumia from another angle

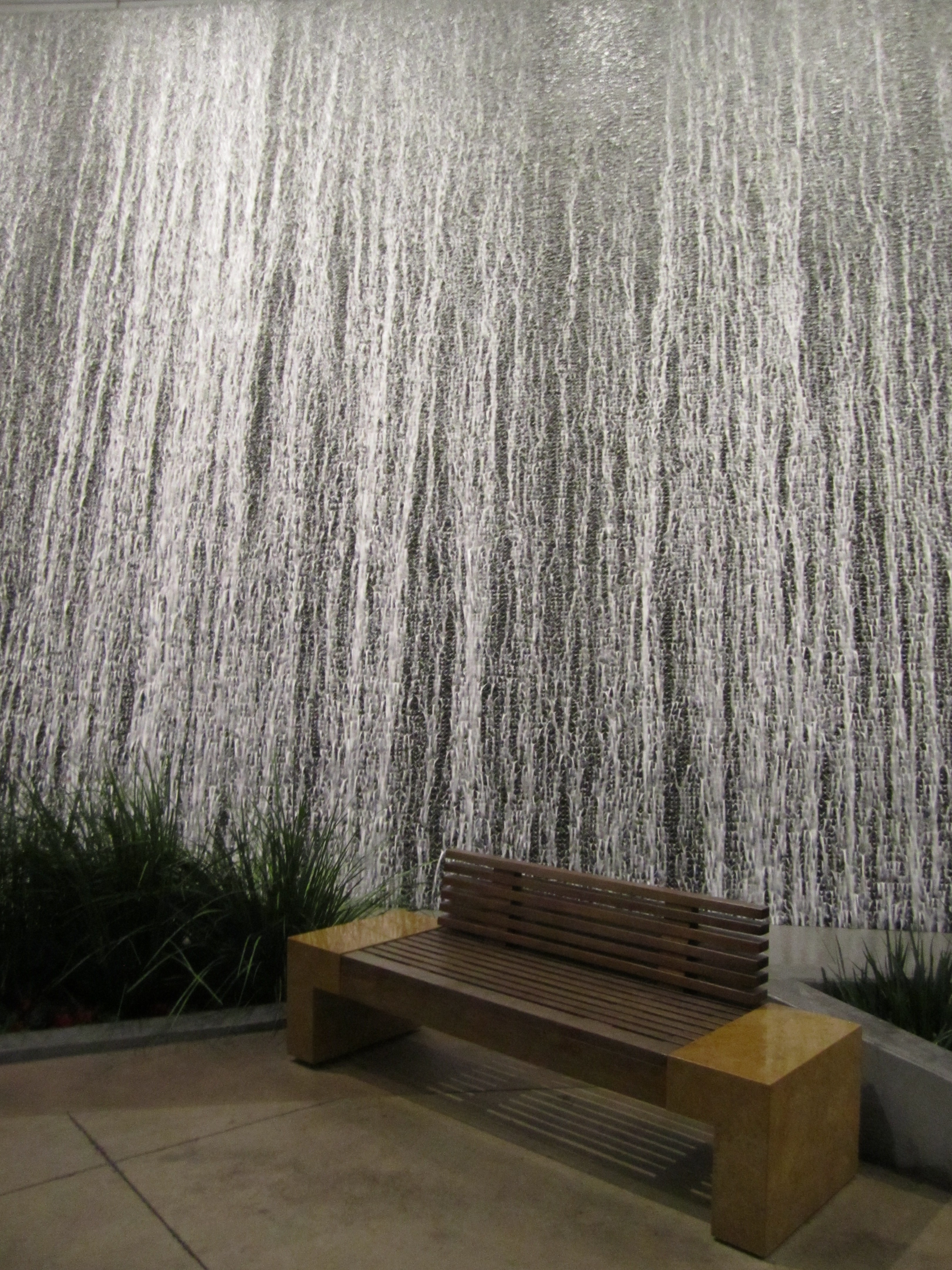
Focus water wall near the south entrance

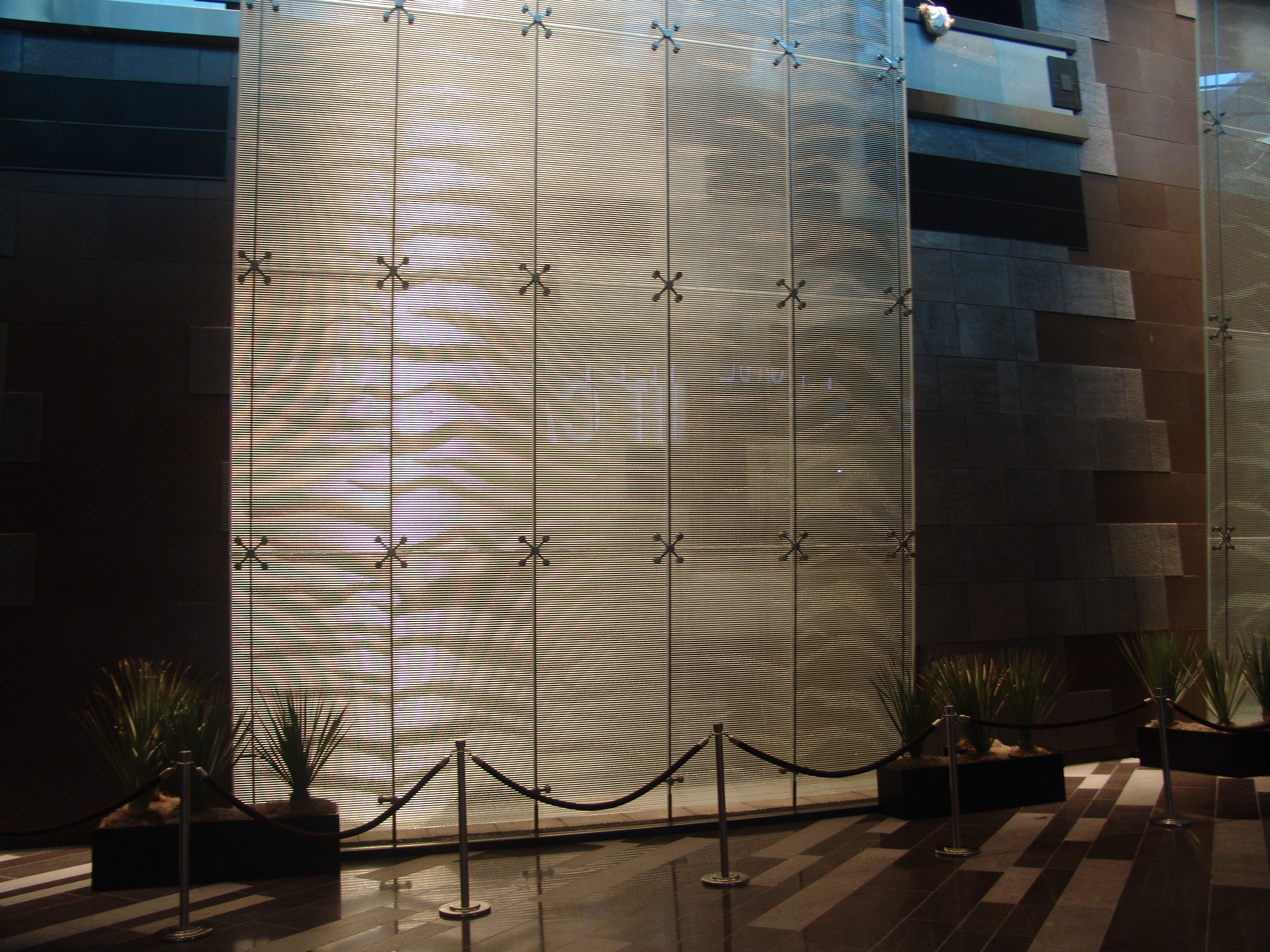
Latisse, another water wall inside the resort

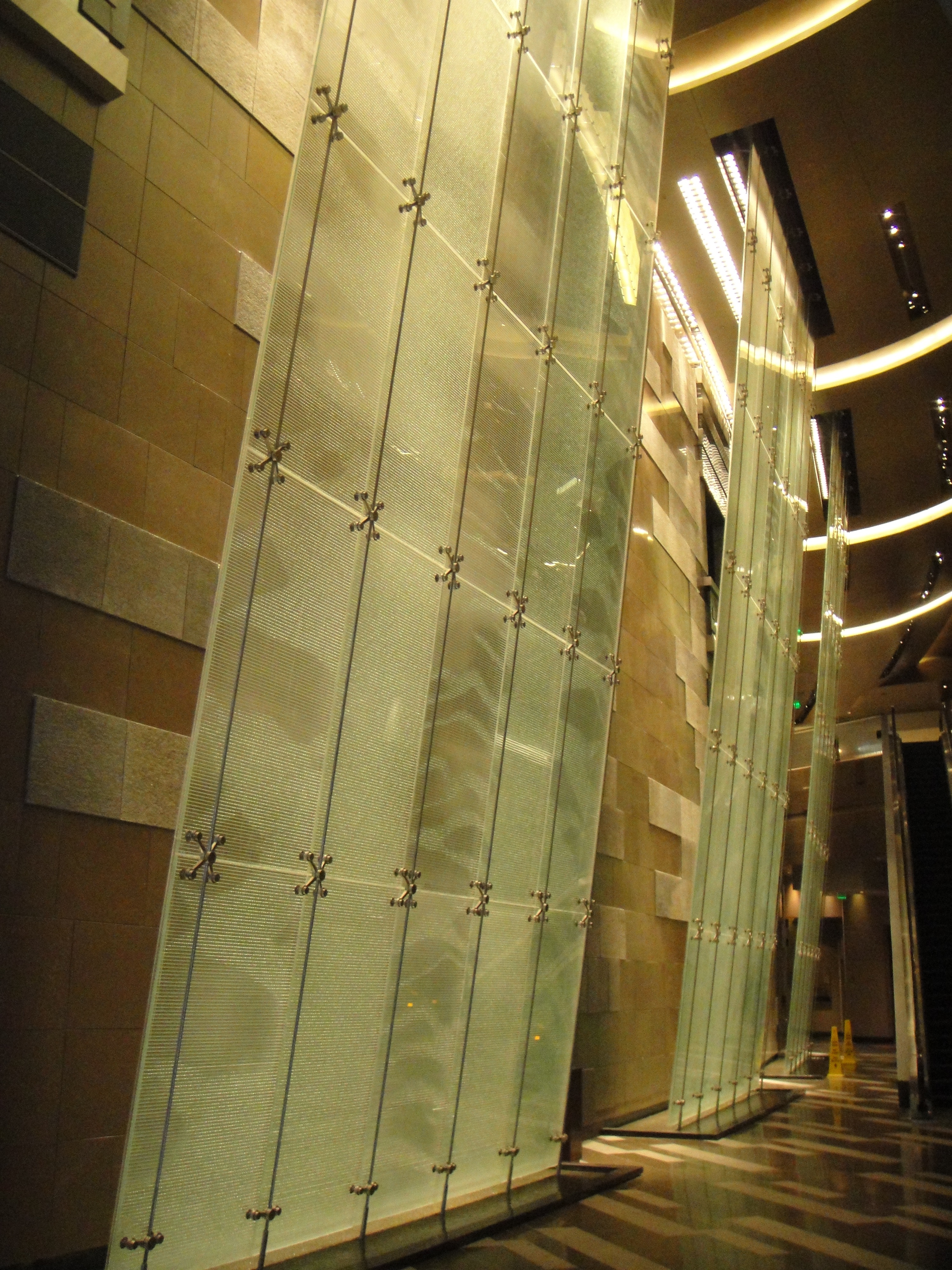
Latisse from another angle

=== Other features ===
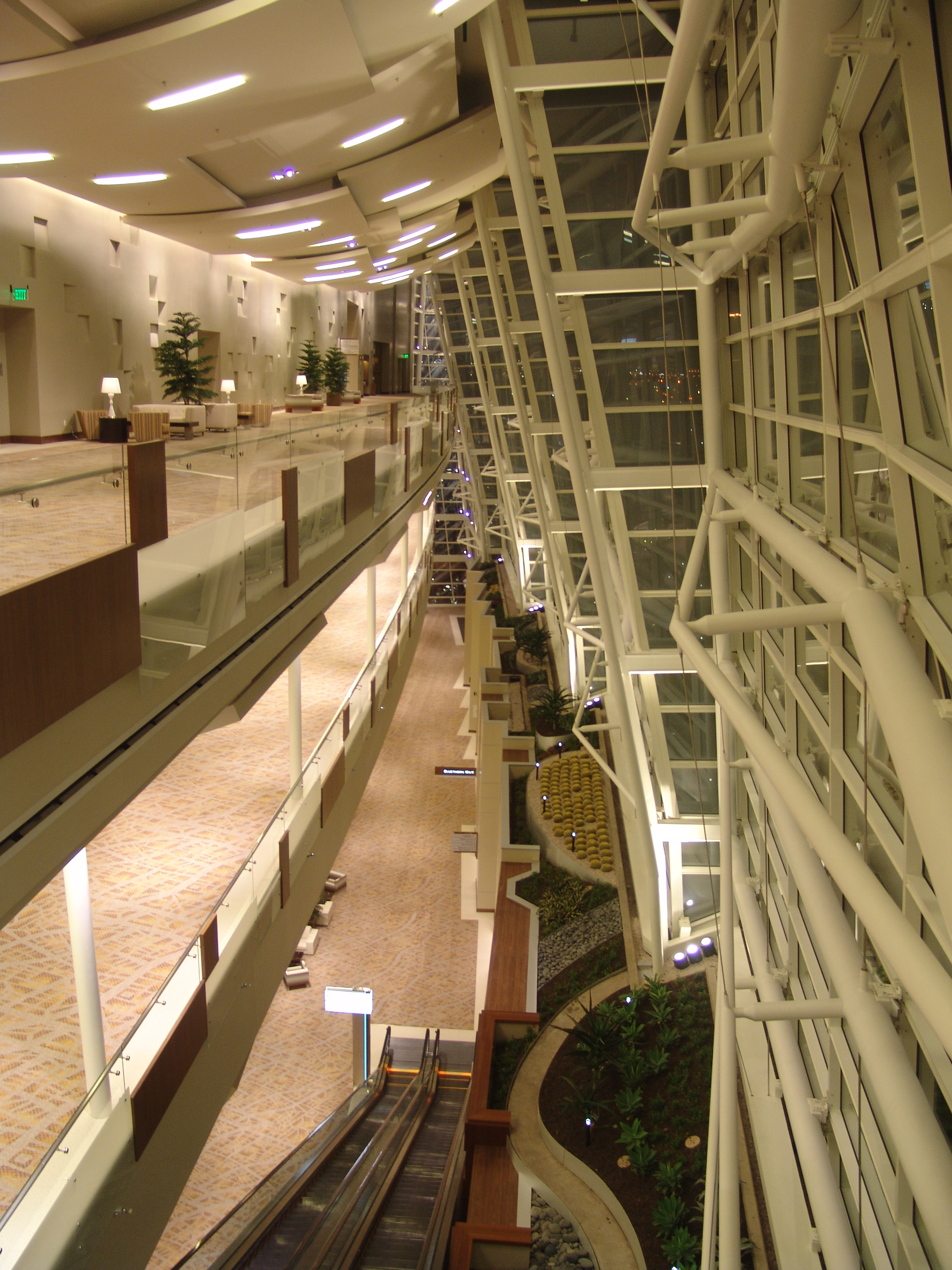
View from the convention center's third floor, 2009

Aria opened with a three-story convention center covering 300,000 sq ft (28,000 m^{2}). A wedding chapel was added to the convention center's first floor in 2013. A four-story expansion of the convention center was completed in February 2018, after nearly two years of construction. It cost $170 million and added 200,000 sq ft (19,000 m^{2}), taking the place of the resort's showroom.

When Aria opened, it included the largest spa of any MGM resort. The 80,000-square-foot (7,400 m^{2}) spa and salon covers two floors, and a coed balcony attached to the spa overlooks an outdoor infinity-edge pool.

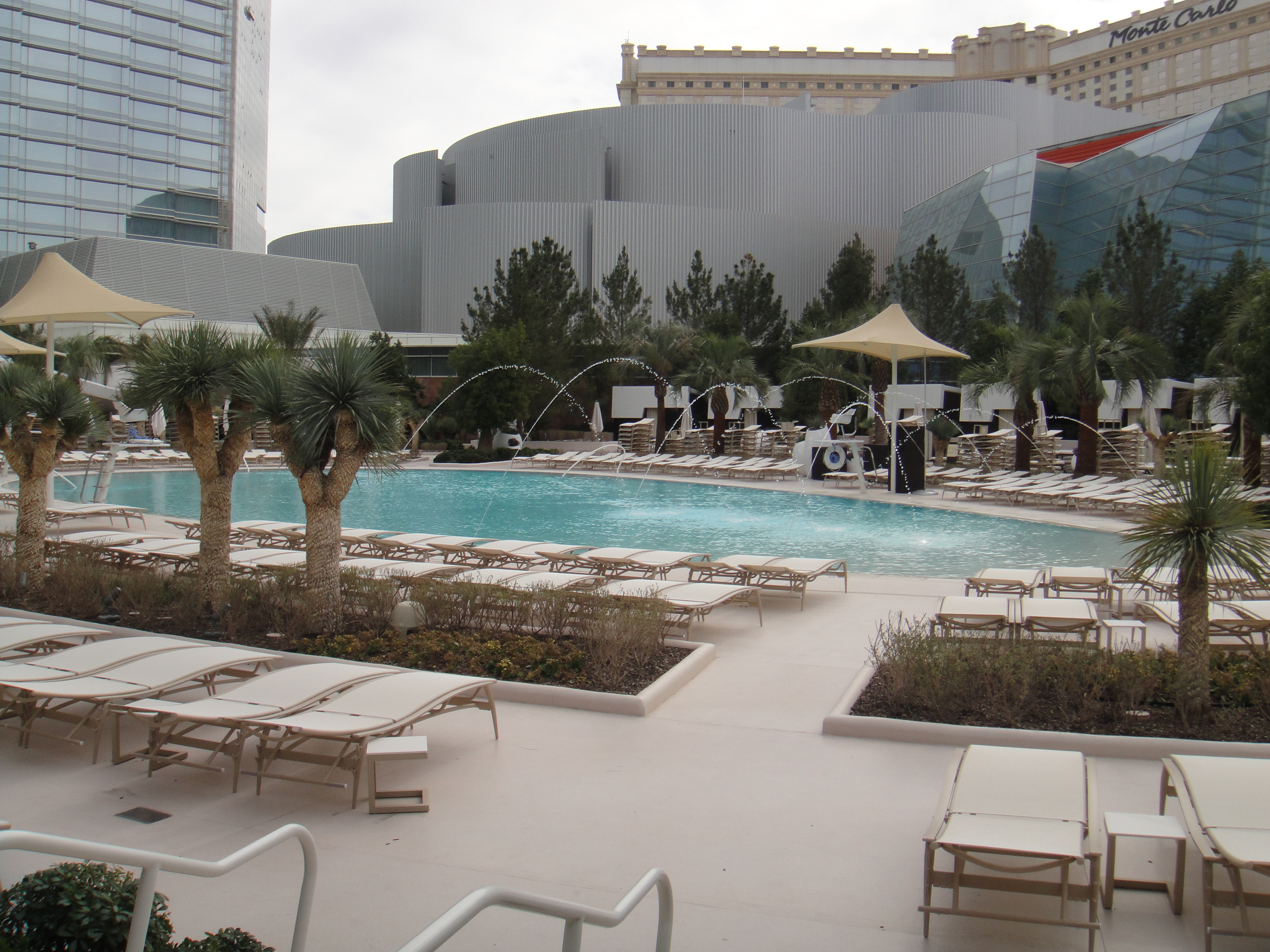
One of Aria's pools

Aria's pool deck measures 215,000 sq ft (20,000 m^{2}) and features acacia, bottle, palm and pine trees. Liquid Pool Lounge, opened in March 2010, includes several pools and DJ entertainment. Liquid Pool also opened with a small restaurant, Breeze Café, which has since closed.

In 2012, a new, larger resort sign was added along Interstate 15, located behind Aria. Another sign, created by YESCO, was erected along the Strip in 2013. Standing 250 feet, it is the tallest sign on the Strip. It includes a 10,000 sq ft (930 m^{2}) LED screen with 11 million pixels.

== Shows ==
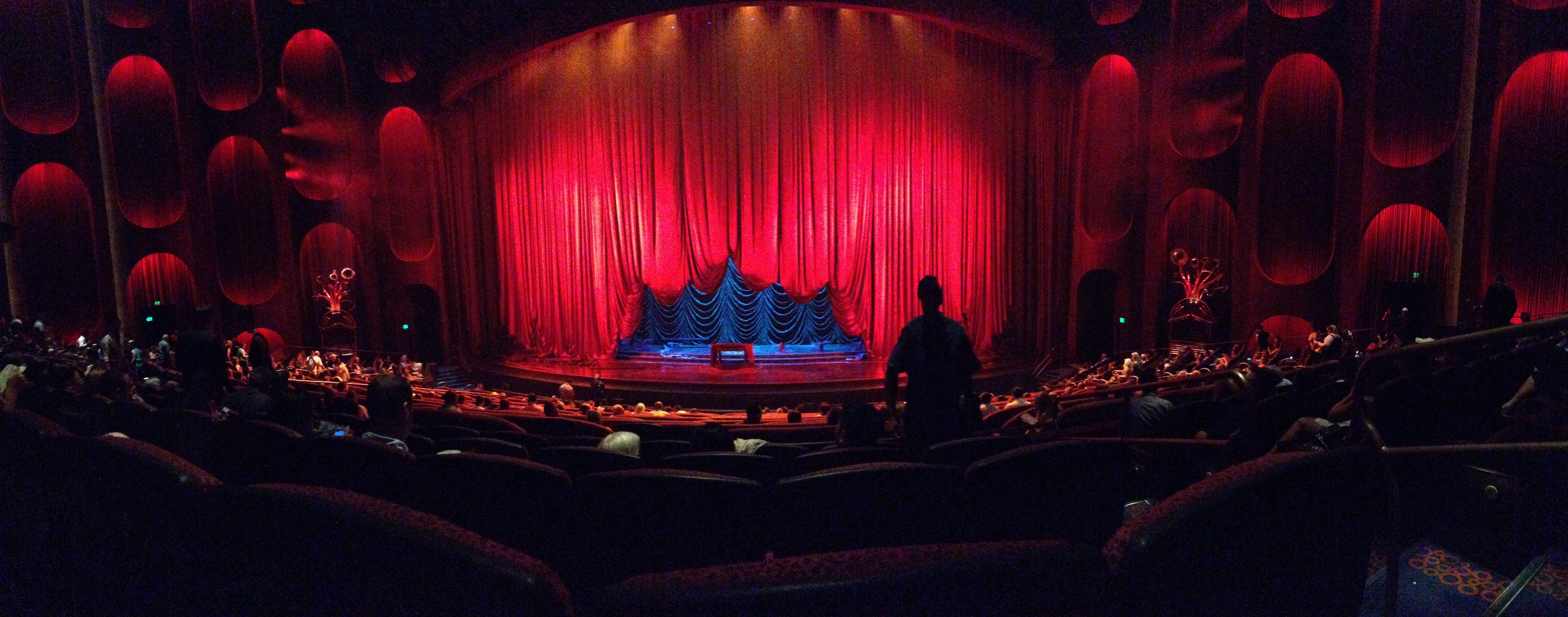
Zarkana theater in 2013

Cirque du Soleil, CKX, Inc. and its subsidiary Elvis Presley Enterprises created a permanent show at Aria, titled Viva Elvis. It premiered on February 17, 2010 and consisted of music, singers, dancers, acrobats and multimedia components that paid tribute to Presley. The performance theater, the only one at CityCenter, had capacity for 1,840 people.

Viva Elvis ended its run on August 31, 2012 due to low ticket sales, and was replaced on November 1, 2012 by Cirque du Soleil's rock opera Zarkana. The show and theater closed in April 2016 to allow for the convention center expansion.

== Reception ==
Early guest reviews were generally negative, with wide-ranging complaints concerning slow check-in, the dark casino design, high-priced amenities, malfunctioning room electronics, and poor service. In a positive review, Fred A. Bernstein of The New York Times praised the hotel's technological features and luxury. He further wrote, "The hotel is huge, and it feels that way, but thanks to thoughtful design, it also feels luxurious and, at times, even cozy". The negative reception was taken into consideration by MGM, which made adjustments based on the feedback. This included improved wireless service, a brighter casino, and a revamped buffet appealing to value-conscious visitors.

Within a year of opening, Aria's hotel received the AAA Five Diamond Award. Its Sky Suites have also received the award, as well as a five-star rating from Forbes Travel Guide. In 2024, readers of USA Today ranked it the 10th best hotel-casino in the U.S.

== In popular culture ==
- Aria appears in the 2013 film Now You See Me, which includes footage of the casino floor and a Sky Villa suite.
- Aria is featured prominently in the 2013 film Last Vegas, which included filming at the pool and on the casino floor. A Sky Villa suite and the Haze nightclub were also recreated on a sound stage for the film.
- Aria also appears in the 2016 film Jason Bourne, serving as a filming location for convention scenes and a car chase.
- Aria is among the filming locations used in the 2023 film The Family Plan.

== Gallery ==
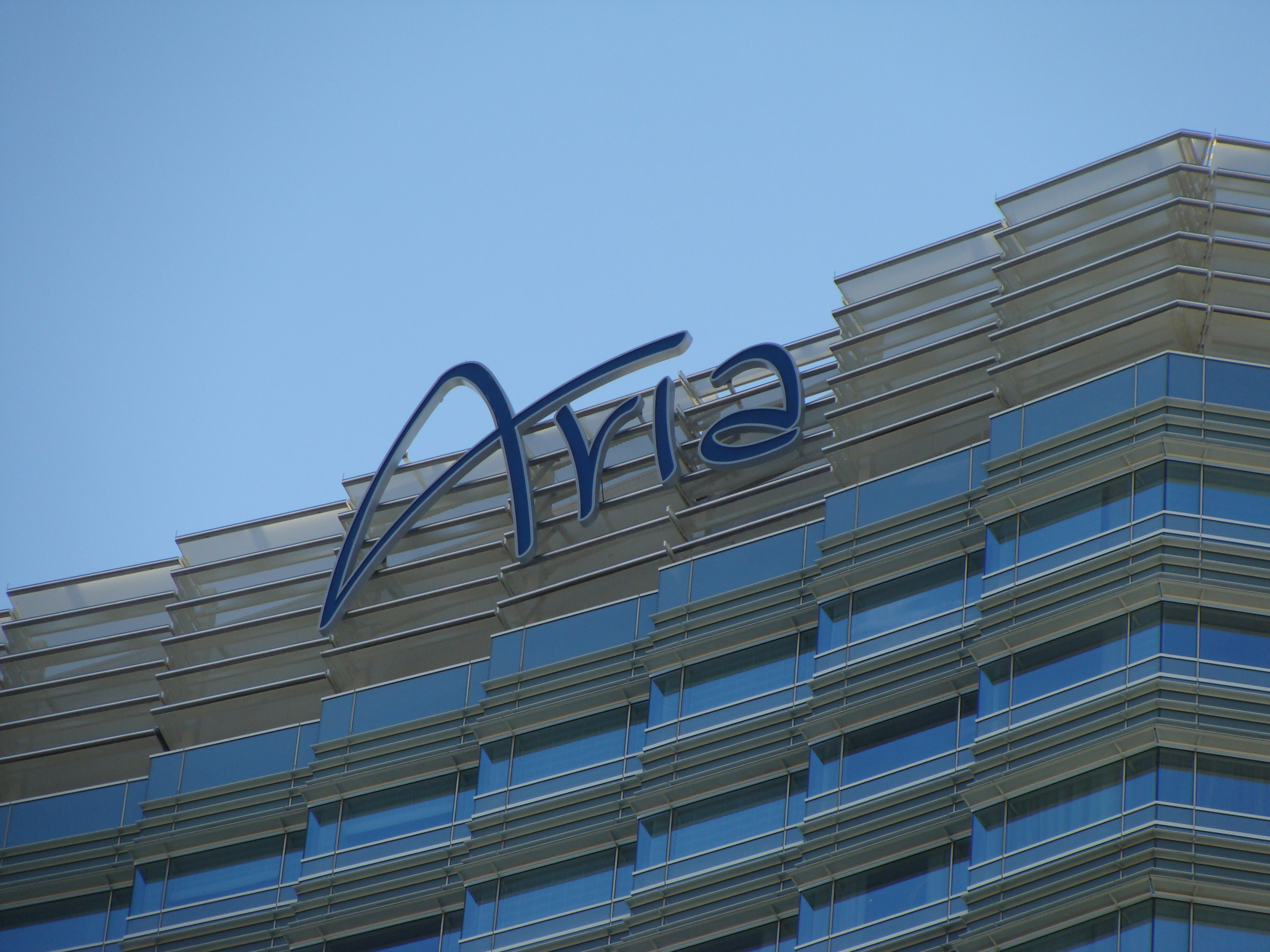
Aria tower signage

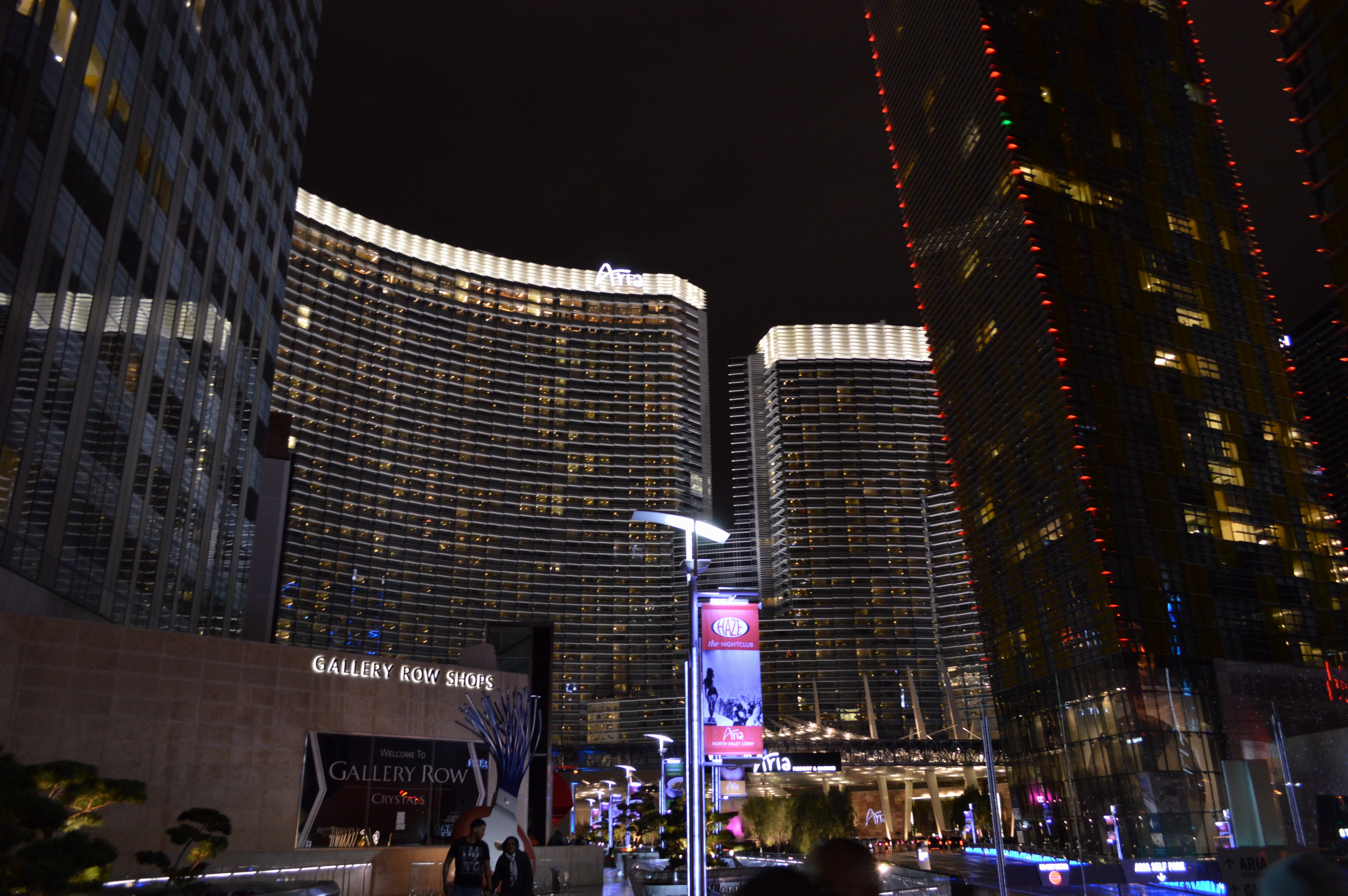
Approaching Aria from the Strip

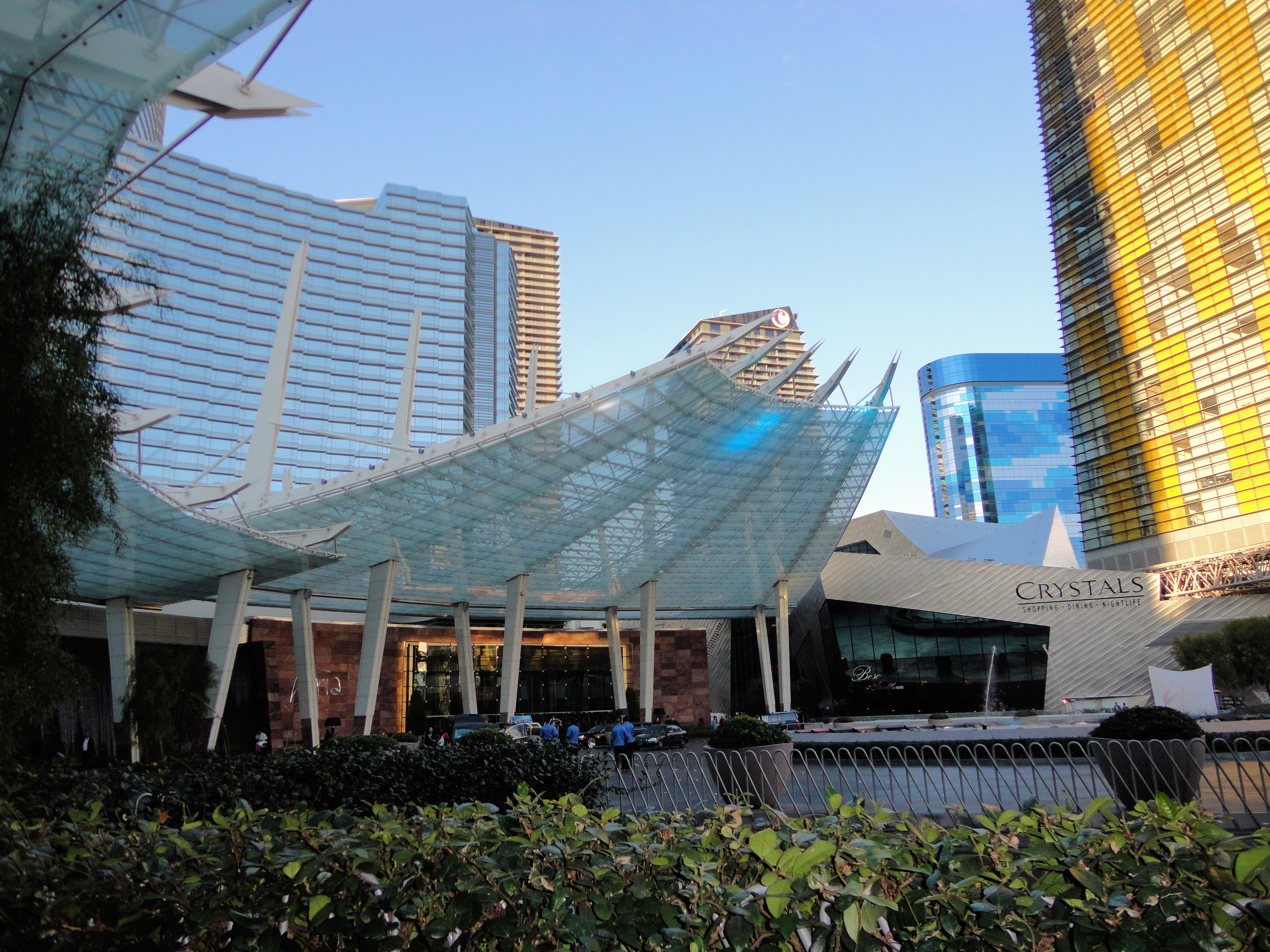
South entrance

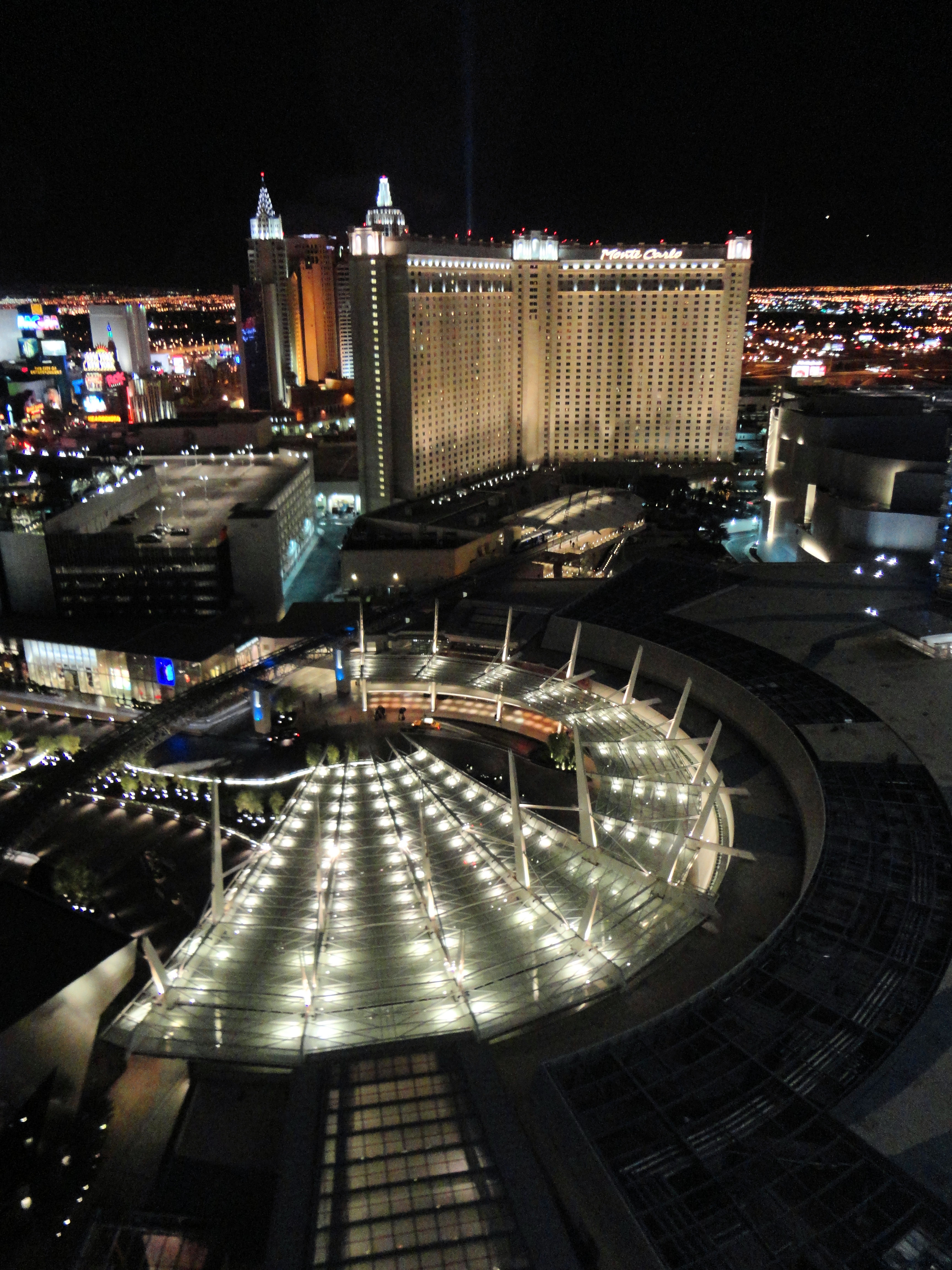
Overlooking the south entrance

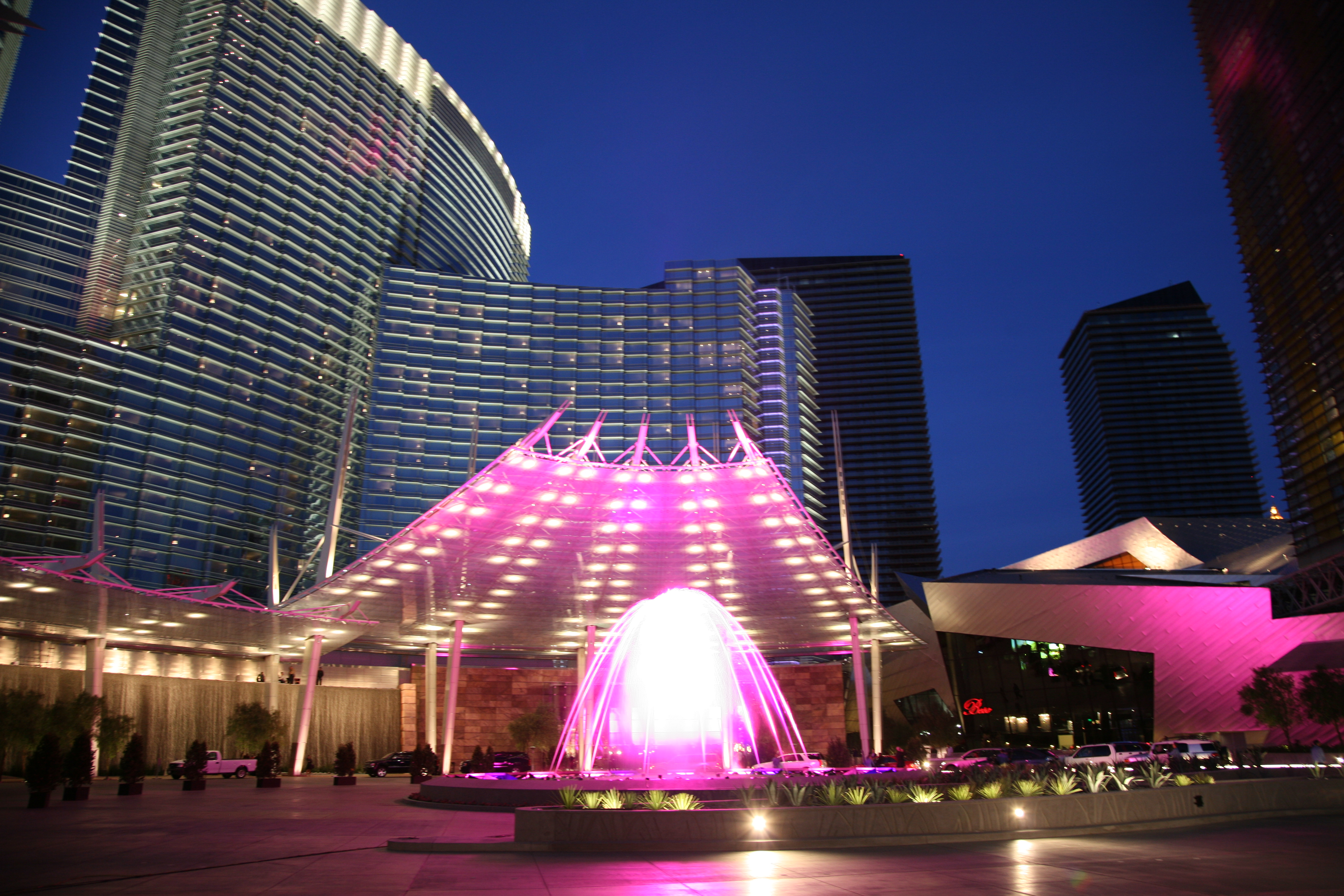
Lumia fountain at south entrance

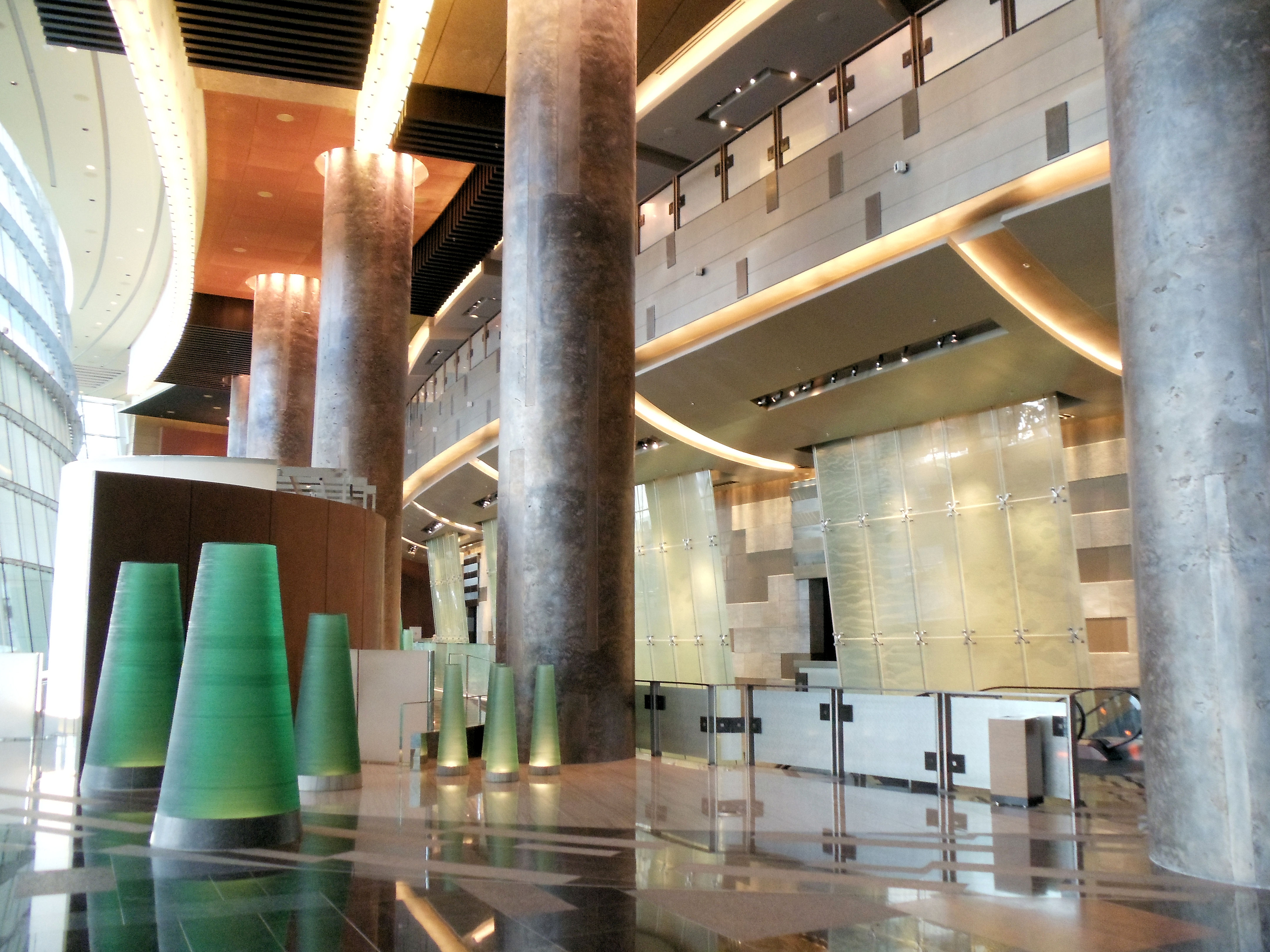
North entrance interior

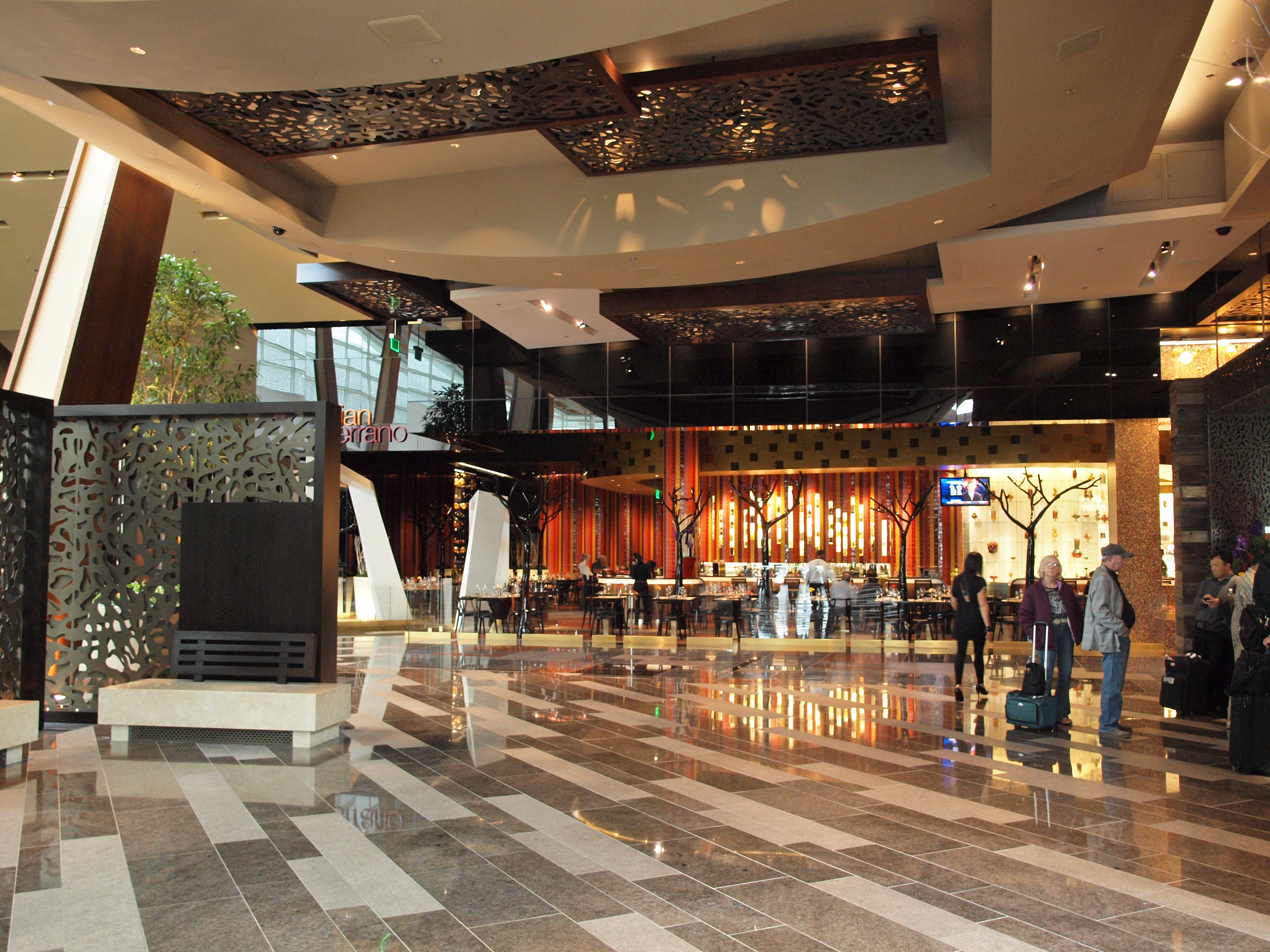
Hotel lobby

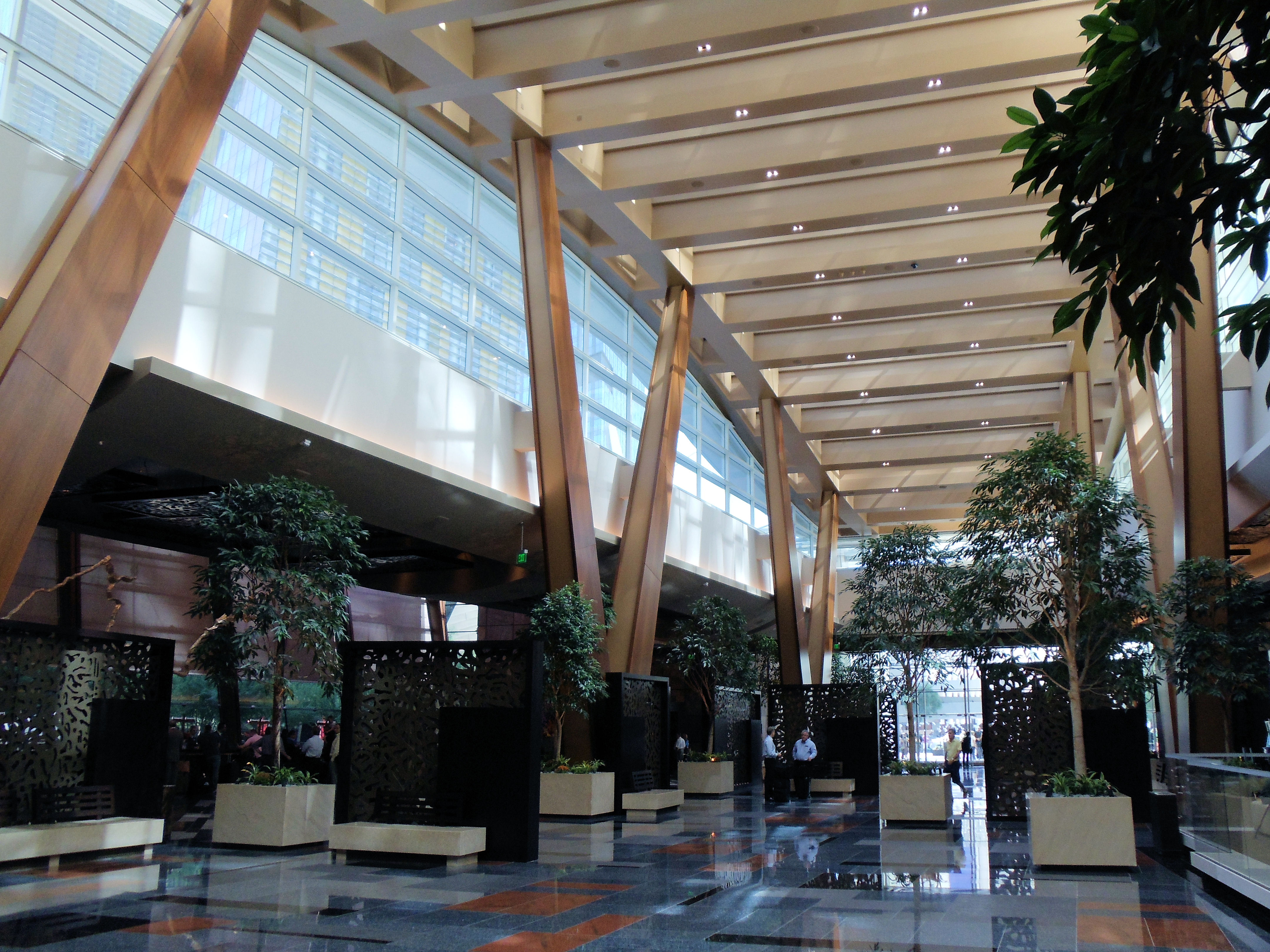
Hotel lobby

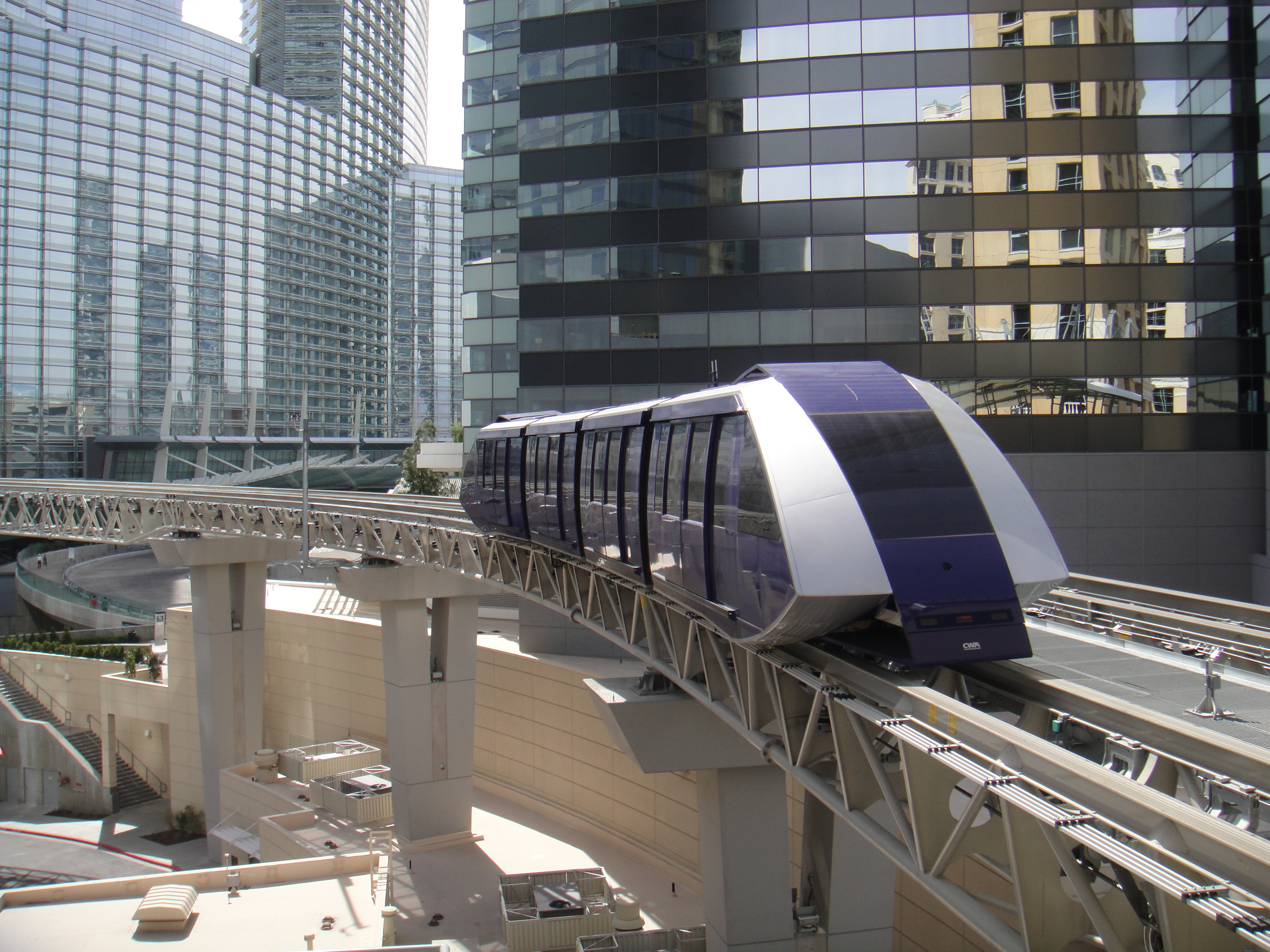
Aria Express monorail

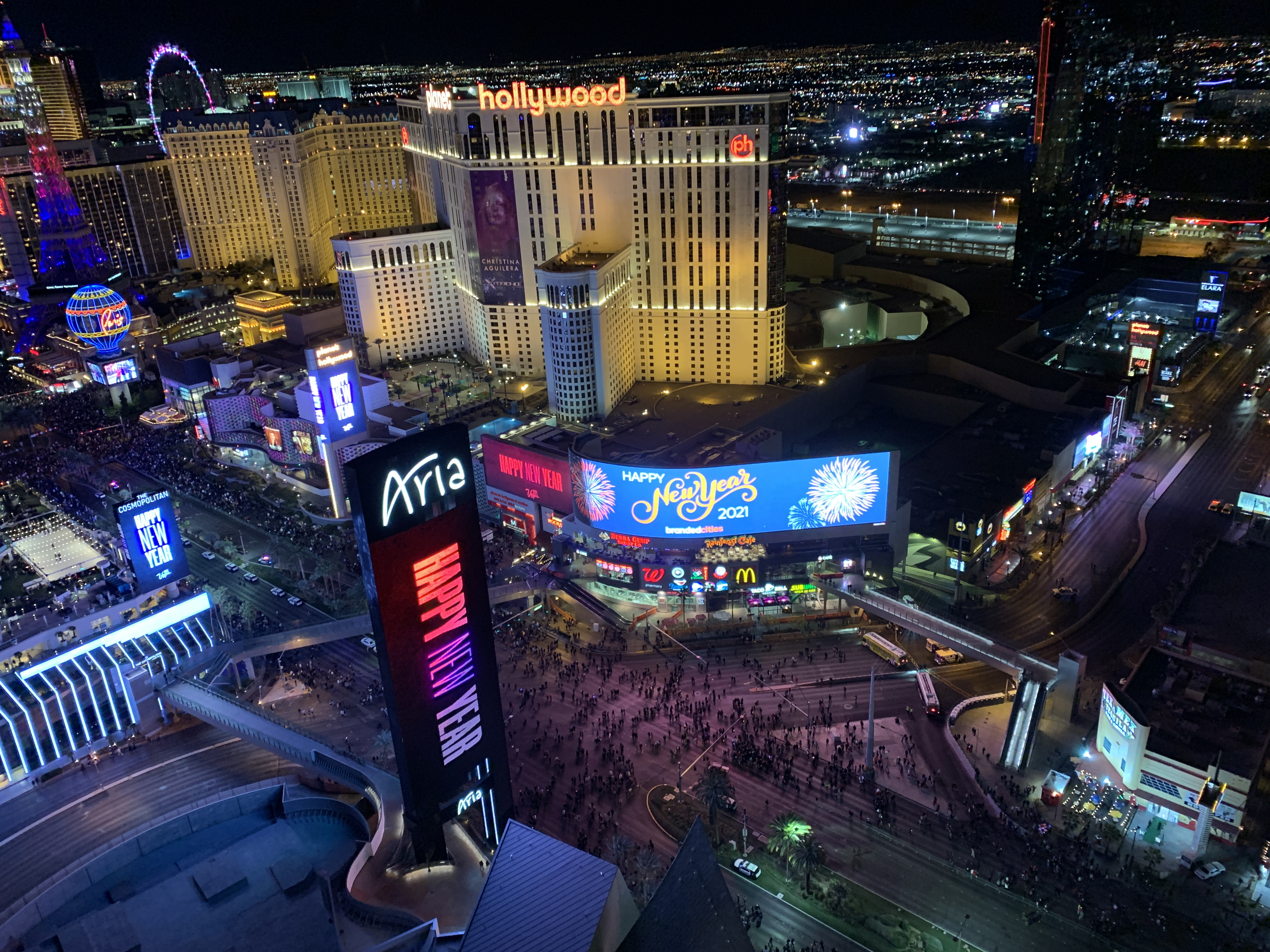
Aria's 250-foot sign during New Year's Eve 2020

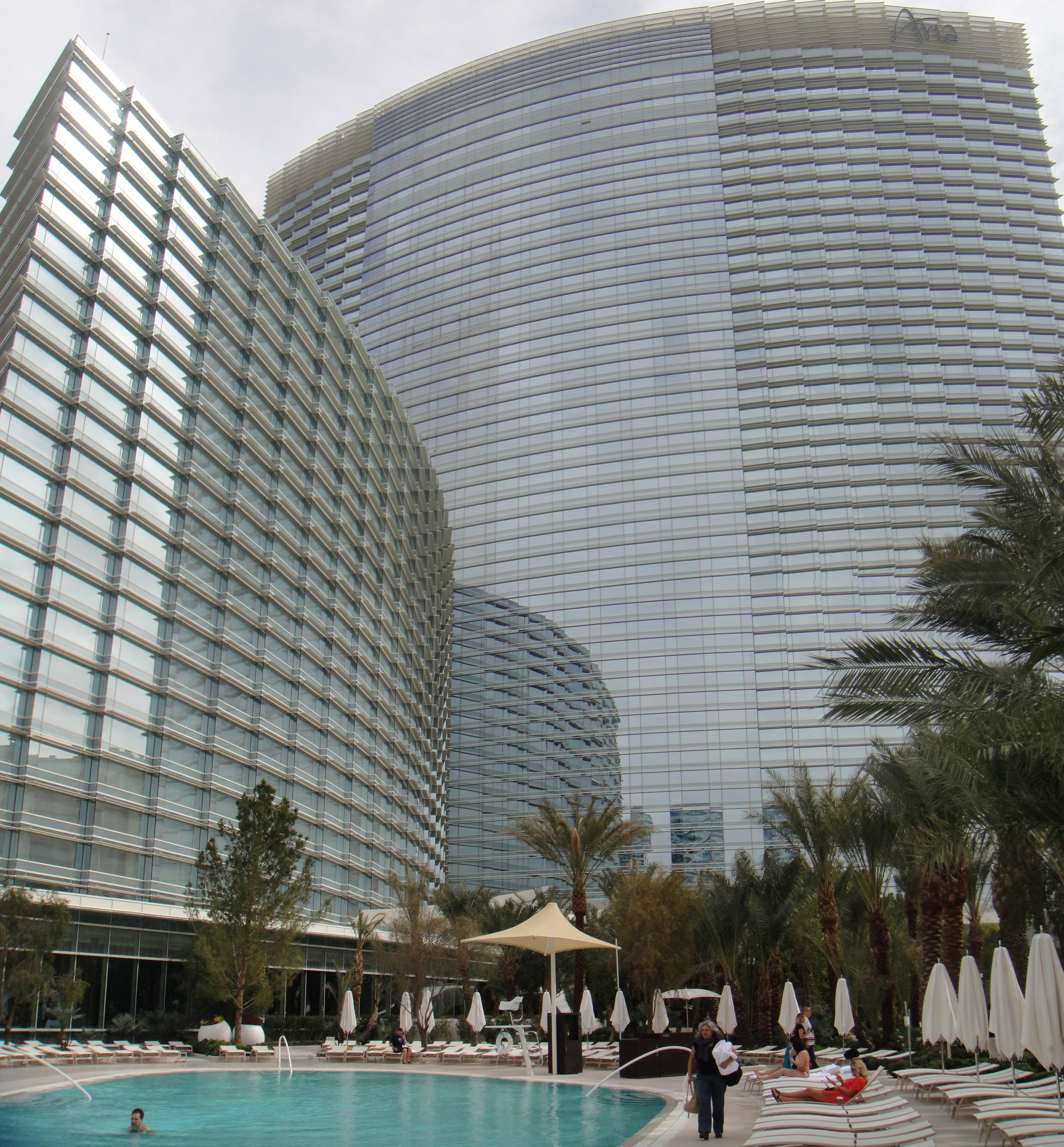
A pool at Aria

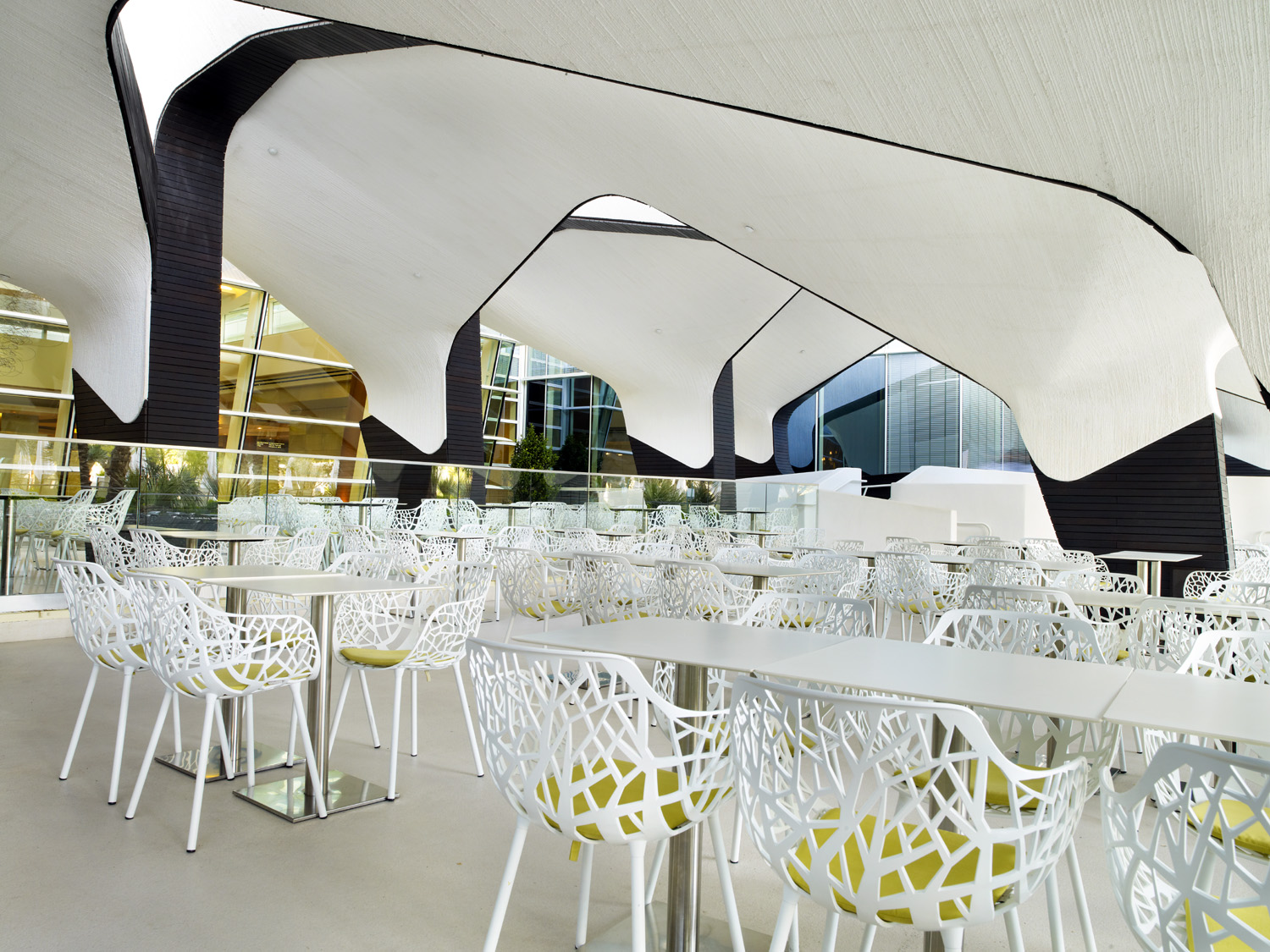
Breeze Café

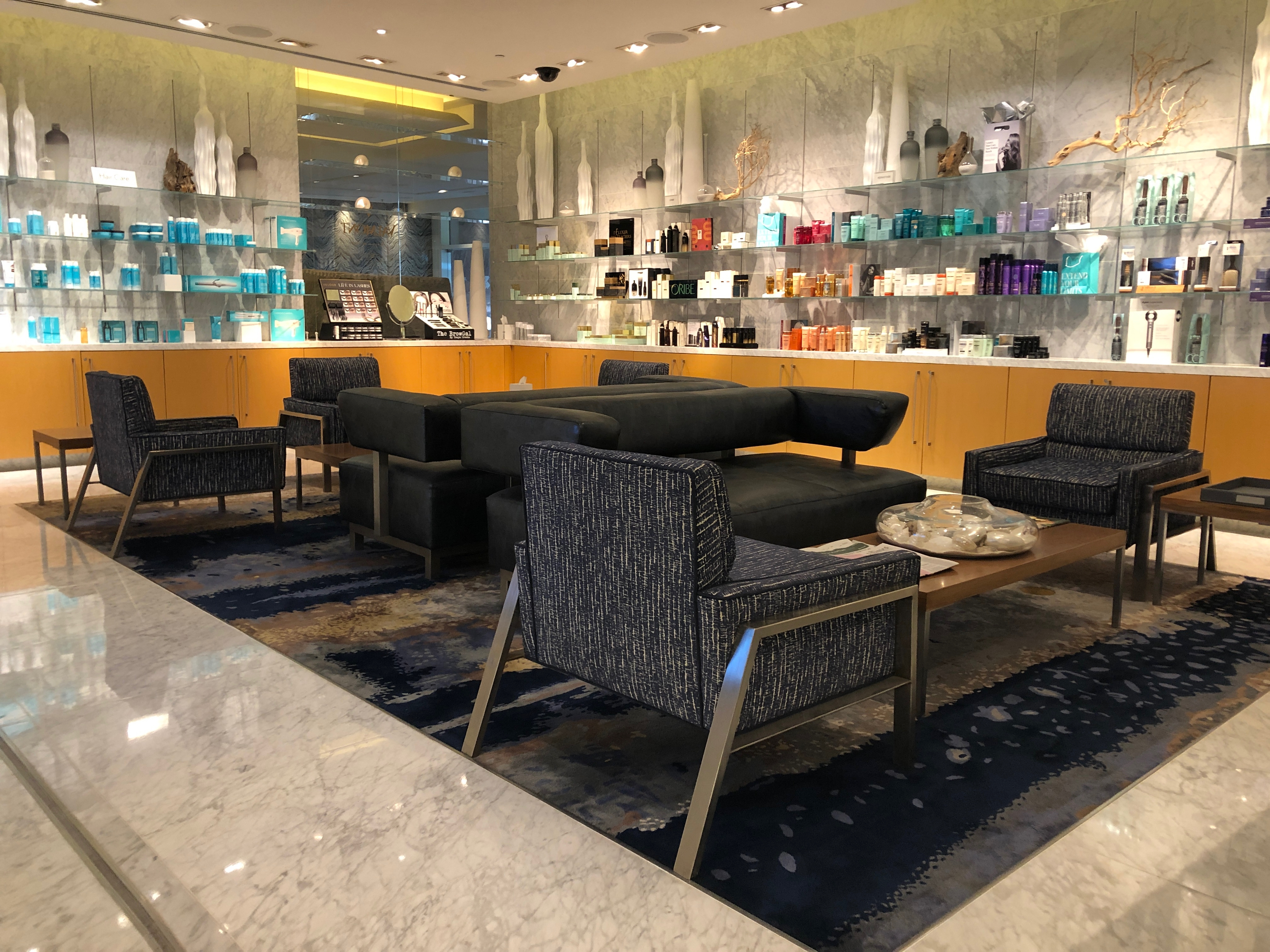
Aria's salon

== See also ==
- List of tallest buildings in Las Vegas
- List of largest hotels
- List of integrated resorts
