= Javier's =

- Interactive map of Javier's

Restaurant information
- Established: 1995; 31 years ago
- Food type: Mexican cuisine
- Location: California, United States
- Coordinates: 36.107323°N 115.176621°W
- Website: javiers-cantina.com

Javier's is an upscale Mexican restaurant chain owned by Javier Sosa. Sosa operates Javier's restaurants in California, Nevada, and Mexico. The first Javier's was founded by Sosa in 1995 in Laguna Beach, California.

== History ==
In 1969, Javier Sosa left his family home to find work. He started working as a dishwasher at Tortilla Flats restaurant in Laguna Beach, California. While working at the restaurant, he met a woman who was a line cook. Eventually, the two would marry. At Tortilla Flats, Sosa became cook, followed by assistant manager and then general manager of Tortilla Flats' three locations. He worked for the company for 24 years as the company grew.

In 1980, he started "Taco Tuesday" and is credited with being the first person to introduce the concept of discounted tacos on Tuesdays in the United States. Eventually, he was fired from Tortilla Flats.

He opened his first restaurant in Laguna Beach on April 10, 1995. The restaurant closed around 2008. That year, he opened a location in Newport Beach, California. A restaurant at John Wayne Airport was opened soon thereafter, called Javi's.

In 2012, Sosa opened a restaurant in Las Vegas, Nevada at the Aria Resort & Casino. The restaurant opening was overseen by Omar Sosa, Sosa's son. To open the restaurant, the Sosa's brought staff from their California restaurants to assist with training the staff. Another location opened in Century City in 2017, taking over the space of a former Seasons 52. Javier's opened a location at the Westfield UTC in San Diego, California in January 2019.

== Design ==
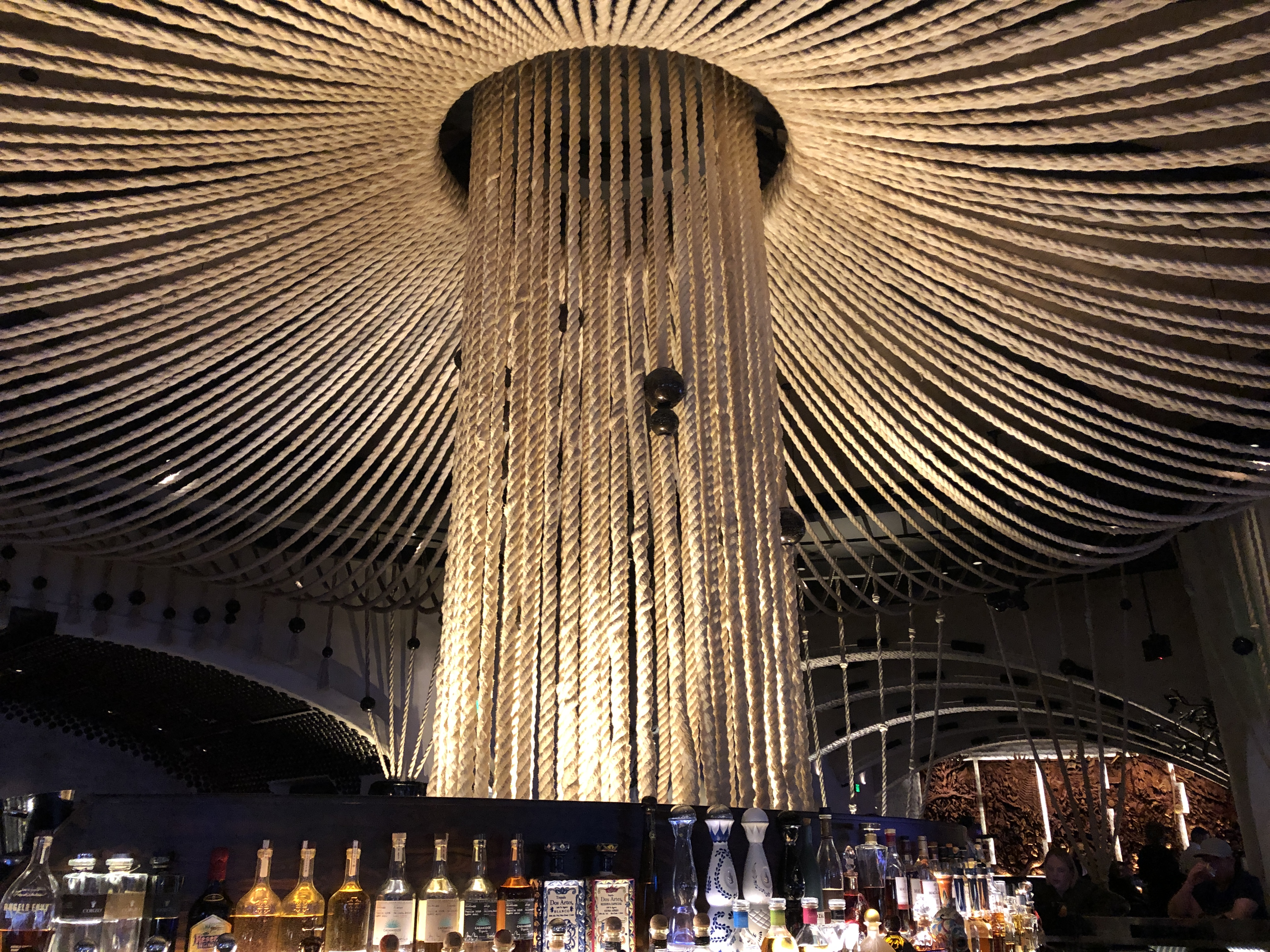
A rope design over the bar at Javier's in Las Vegas.

Javier's restaurants are designed often with Cycladic and Moorish architecture influences, including arches and mosaic flooring. Many areas of the restaurants have dark lighting, with candlelight being used throughout the restaurants. The Las Vegas location has a large circular bar in the middle of the restaurant. Eater describes Javier's in San Diego as resembling "an upmarket beach resort." The Crystal Cove location has a capacity of 350 people. The Century City location has a private room with a private entrance, for VIPs, including an optional escorted entrance through the kitchen.

== Cuisine ==
Javier's serves Mexican cuisine using Sosa's family recipes. The California locations use locally sourced produced and sustainable seafood.

=== Food ===
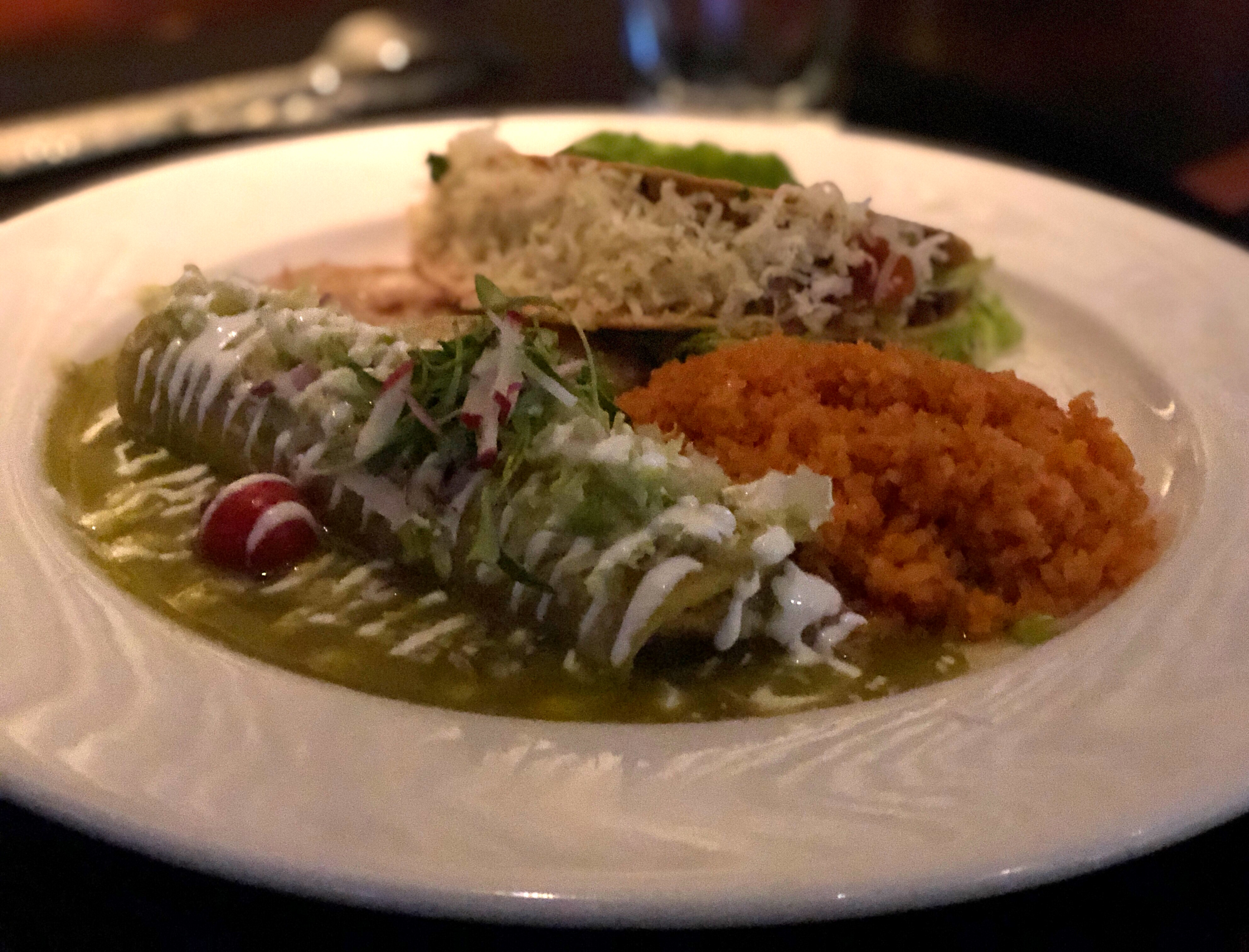
An enchilada at Javier's in Las Vegas

Appetizers include queso fundido with pasilla peppers, mushrooms, chorizo, onions and chipotle and ceviches.

Entreés include dungeness crab, Maine lobster, and shrimp enchiladas and chiles rellenos. The mole poblano is served with an airline chicken breast. Desserts include a corn cake with vanilla ice cream.

=== Beverages ===
Javier's locations have large tequila selections and specialize in margaritas. Margarita flavors include tamarind, cucumber, jalapeño, and pineapple. A signature cocktail is the Diamante Negro martini with Maestro Dobel tequila, agave nectar and lime juice served in a glass with a black salt rim.

== Reception ==
Crystal Cove, Newport Beach

The Orange County Register has described Javier's as "pioneering the gourmet Mexican food movement in Orange County." In 2019, the newspaper named Javier's Crystal Cove location as one of the best restaurants in Orange County. Food critic Brad A. Johnson calls the restaurant ambiance as being like "a five-star Mexican resort" with "exquisite" carnitas and an "encyclopedic" selection of tequila. Michelin Guide gives Javier's "The Plate" rating. The guide praises the restaurant's ocean views and "magical" ambiance. The guide calls the menu "comforting" with dishes "prepared with care." The guide cites the relleno de picadillo as a highlight dish.

Las Vegas

The Las Vegas Review-Journal's food critic Heidi Knapp Rinella described the Las Vegas location as not breaking "new culinary ground" but still serving "good, solid renditions" of Mexican classics. Rinella described the enchiladas as "smallish but very good" and called the queso fundido as "better than most." However, Rinella critiqued the server for treating "us like tourists," by not attending to the table in a timely manner and not offering the reviewer a choice of flour or corn tortillas. Overall, Rinella said the experience "was a positive one." In contrast, Las Vegas Weekly calls Javier's a "Strip sleeper" and a "feast you won't soon forget."
