= The Craving =

The Craving may refer to:

- The Craving (1916 film), an American film directed by Charles Bartlett
- The Craving (1918 film), an American film directed by John and Francis Ford
- The Craving (album), a 1996 album by MD.45
- "The Craving" (song), a 2024 song by Twenty One Pilots

== See also ==
- Crave (disambiguation), including uses of The Crave and Craving
