= Crave =

Crave or Craving may refer to:

== Entertainment and media ==
=== Companies and services ===
- Crave (streaming service), a Canadian video-on-demand streaming service
- Crave (TV network), a Canadian linear pay TV service operated in conjunction with the above streaming service
- Crave Records, a defunct record label
- Crave Entertainment, a defunct video game developer
- Mandatory (company) (previously CraveOnline), a men's-oriented website

=== Music ===
- Crave (band), an American hip hop and R&B group

==== Albums ====
- Crave (Cyclefly album) or the title song, 2002
- Crave (For King & Country album) or the title song, 2012
- Crave (Kiesza album) or the title song, 2020
- The Crave, an album by Stephen Dale Petit, or the title song, 2010
- Craving (album), by Fayray, or the title song 1999

==== Songs ====
- "Crave" (Madonna and Swae Lee song), 2019
- "Crave" (Years & Years song), 2021
- "Crave", by Paramore from This Is Why, 2023
- "Crave", by Pharrell Williams from the Hidden Figures film soundtrack, 2016
- "Craving", by James Bay from Chaos and the Calm, 2015
- "Craving (I Only Want What I Can't Have)", by t.A.T.u. from Dangerous and Moving, 2005

=== Other media ===
- Crave (play), a 1998 play by Sarah Kane
- Crave (film), a 2012 film
- Craving (2018 film), a Dutch film
- Craving (2023 film), an American horror film
- "Craving" (Smallville), a 2001 television episode

== Other uses ==
- Food craving, a desire to consume a specific food
- Craving (withdrawal), a psychological withdrawal symptom
- Jaimee Foxworth (born 1979), stage name Crave, American actress and model

== See also ==
- Desire, sometimes referred to as "craving"
- The Craving (disambiguation)
- Taṇhā, a concept in Buddhism that deals with cravings
