= Crave (band) =

Crave is an American hip hop and R&B musical group from Pittsburgh, Pennsylvania.

Made up of singers Mandell Loman, Maurice Walker and Manny Deanda, the group self-released an album, Demboyz, in 2005. The band signed with Universal Records in 2007. They released a single, "Freaky Deaky", in collaboration with Miami-based hip hop/R&B group Pretty Ricky. The single received play on the Pittsburgh urban radio station WAMO. The group toured with Pretty Ricky in 2007, performing in the Midwest, including dates in Cincinnati, Ohio and Memphis, Tennessee.
