= Eugene Remm =

American restaurateur

- Occupations: Entrepreneur, restaurateur
- Years active: 2006–present
- Website: eugeneremm.com

Eugene Remm is a New York-based entrepreneur, restaurateur and commentator on the hospitality industry. In 2016, Remm was called by Forbes magazine, one of the "New Kings of New York Hospitality".

== EMM ==
Remm and his partner Mark Birnbaum founded EMM Group (now known as Catch Hospitality Group) in 2006. EMM has developed a portfolio of successful ventures across New York, Los Angeles, Dubai, and Playa del Carmen. Remm's present focus is the domestic and international expansion of EMM's seafood concept "CATCH" with its original location in New York City's Meatpacking District after noticing that there was a noticeable lack of "traditional seafood restaurant in the neighborhood". Recently, EMM Group welcomed a new partner, Tilman Fertitta.

== Biography ==
Remm, the son of Russian immigrants, was born in Russia and grew up in Brooklyn, Queens and New Jersey before attending Long Island's Hofstra University, where he ran a bar and started speculating in real estate. Later, Remm ran NYC lounges for the Gerber Group and Steven Hanson from B.R. Guest. That led to Remm's passion for food and beverage. In 2006, he went on to co-found EMM (Catch Restaurants, Lexington Brass) and launch a series of clubs including TenJune with partner Mark Birnbaum.

== Hospitality commentator ==
Remm and his EMM partners are also known for their role as commentators on the hospitality market, especially in the New York area. Remm has been cited for his role in shaping the hospitality industry in the New York area by Entrepreneur, New York Post, Modern Luxury and Forbes as one of the "New Kings of New York Hospitality". Remm and his partner Mark Birnbaum implemented dynamic hospitality experiences by using food, service and vibe to create transitions between dining, nightlife and entertainment.

== Ventures ==
Since 2006, Remm has been involved with several NYC properties including Tenjune, Catch, Lulu's, Abe & Arthur's and SL New York, as well as a club in Miami. In 2015, EMM opened international locations at Catch Dubai, in Dubai, UAE, and Catch Playa del Carmen in Playa del Carmen, Mexico. Seafood restaurant Catch (2011) went from a standalone NYC flagship to an international phenomenon with locations in L.A., Dubai and Playa del Carmen and additional outposts slated for 2018.
