= Icrave (design firm) =

US design firm

Icrave (styled ICRAVE) is an innovation and design studio founded in 2002 by Canadian-born designer Lionel Ohayon. Conceived as a design and brand strategy company, the studio's projects were predominantly in nightlife sector, including lounges and clubs in Manhattan, Los Angeles and Las Vegas. The studio's nightlife work has been associated with the development of New York City's Meatpacking District.

Over the past decade, the studio has designed hospitality spaces, including restaurants, bars, casinos, and hotels. Working with The One Group, ICRAVE developed the STK steakhouse brand with 7 locations across the US. The steakhouse brand went public in 2015. The firm is now developing STK's sister brand, STK Rebel. The first location will open in Miami in 2016.

In 2008, the studio designed JetBlue Terminal 5 at John F. Kennedy International Airport in New York, incorporating technology into the gate hold areas and dining spaces. Touch screen monitors were used for food service ordering and passenger self-service in gate hold areas. Today, their roster of airport work spans dozens of venues across North America.

The studio's work has expanded to include brand strategy, product design, and graphic design. The studio has been tasked with creating identities and collateral for client projects ranging from logos to marketing materials to staff uniforms. In 2012, Icrave established an in-house lighting department, Icrave Lighting (styled ICRAVE LIGHTING), to consult across all projects.

In recent years, Icrave's project roster has expanded to new sectors, including healthcare, higher education, and residential developments. For the past two years, Icrave has been working with Memorial Sloan Kettering on two ambulatory care centers in New York's Upper East Side. The Josie Robertson Surgery Center is slated to open in early 2016.

Icrave's work has received recognition from Architizer, Travel + Leisure, Frommer's, Fodor's, International Design, International Interior Design, Hospitality Design, Restaurant & Bar Design, and Hamptons Cottages and Gardens.

== Notable projects ==
- John F. Kennedy International Airport, JetBlue Terminal 5
- LaGuardia Airport, Delta Terminal C
- LaGuardia Airport, Delta Terminal D
- Toronto Pearson International Airport, various venues
- Josie Robertson Surgery Center at Memorial Sloan Kettering
- STK, Meatpacking District NYC
- STK, Midtown NYC
- STK, Los Angeles
- STK, Las Vegas
- STK, Chicago
- Catch Restaurant, NYC
- Le District, NYC
- Ocean Prime, Beverly Hills
- Ocean Prime, NYC
- Sushi Samba, Las Vegas
- Provocateur, NYC
- Marquee Nightclub, Sydney
- W Hotels, Atlanta Midtown
- Sir Adam Hotel, Amsterdam
- Hotel Gansevoort Lobby, Meatpacking District NYC
- Regent Seven Seas Explorer
