= Casa Playa =

Coordinates: 36.1290°N 115.1659°W

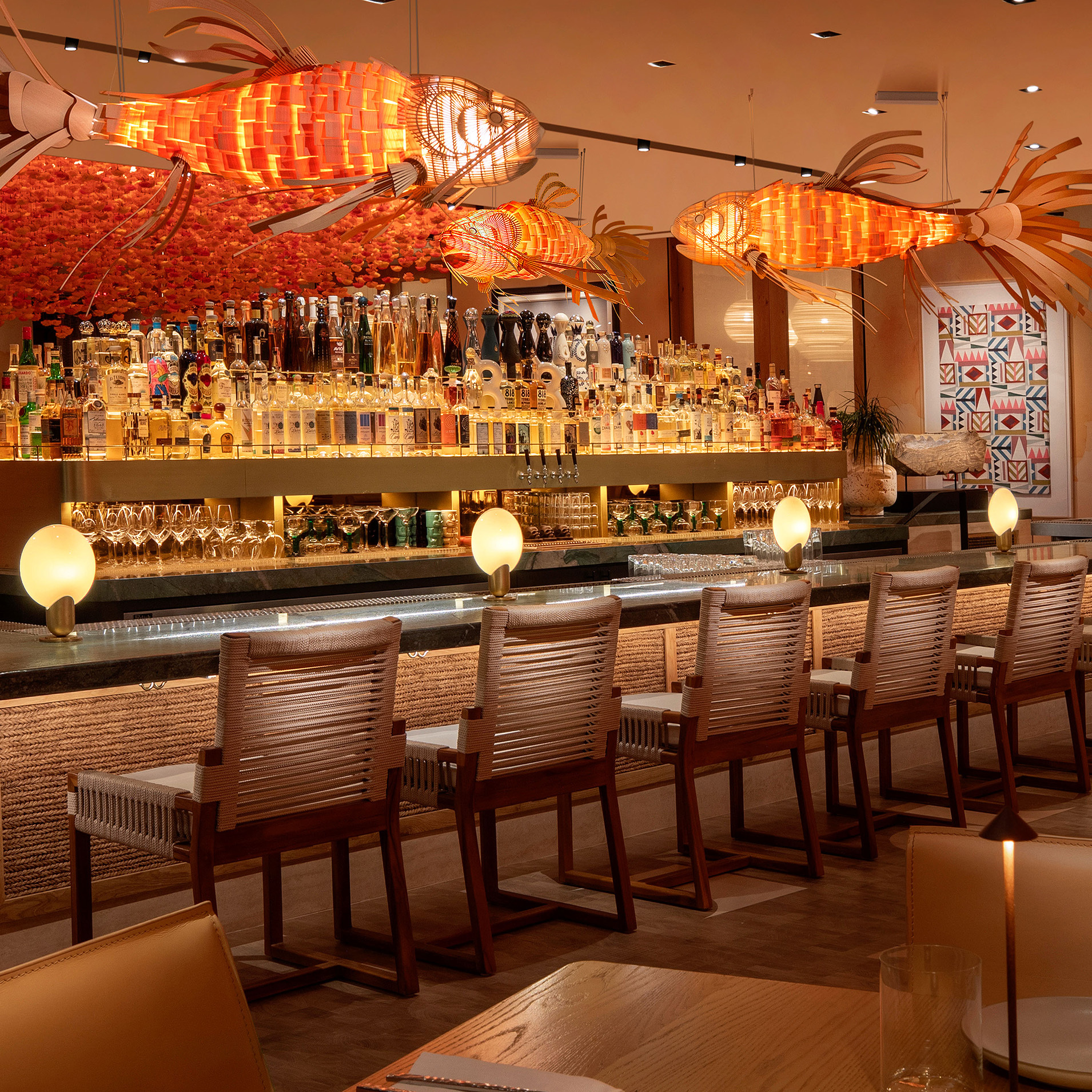
- The lounge bar at Casa Playa
- Interactive map of Casa Playa

Restaurant information
- Established: 2021
- Location: 3131 Las Vegas Blvd S, Las Vegas, Clark County, Nevada, Nevada, 89109, United States
- Website: www.wynnlasvegas.com/dining/fine-dining/casa-playa

Casa Playa is a coastal Mexican restaurant located within Encore Las Vegas. It is located near Encore Beach Club. It is led by James Beard–finalist executive chef Sarah Thompson.

== History ==
Casa Playa opened in 2021 in the former Elio space. Chef Sarah Thompson has served as executive chef since opening. She previously served as chef de cuisine at Elio. Prior to Wynn, chef Thompson worked at the Michelin-starred Marea as well as serving as executive sous chef at the upscale Mexican restaurant Cosme.

Chef Thompson was named a James Beard finalist in 2025. Chef Thompson describes her method as "my goal is to take the best of the country’s cuisine and then elevate it."

Condé Nast describes the architecture as "a contemporary take on preclassical Mexican aesthetics, and alive with people enjoying themselves".

== Cuisine ==
Condé Nast describes the menu as "highlighting faultlessly fresh ingredients" and "targeted toward in-the-know gourmand". It highlights dishes such as "slightly sweet squash tamal appetizer with mole verde and Thai basil, beautifully charred octopus a la plancha with coloradito mole, and a melty American Wagyu short rib suadero".

Casa Playa has a unique in-house masa program, using nine types of corn grown mostly by small farmers in Oaxaca. From these sources, Casa Playa mills and treats 50-75 kilograms of corn per day, which it then uses to create hand-pressed tortillas and other dishes.

== Reception ==
Las Vegas Weekly's opening review called it "one of the most refined Mexican restaurants the Strip has ever seen".

Casa Playa was named one of the top 100 restaurants in Las Vegas in 2025, as well as among the best Mexican restaurants in Las Vegas, and the best "something different" on the Strip. CBS News described the cuisine as "spectacular".

== See also ==
- List of restaurants in the Las Vegas Valley
