= Two Friends (DJs) =

American DJ/producer duo

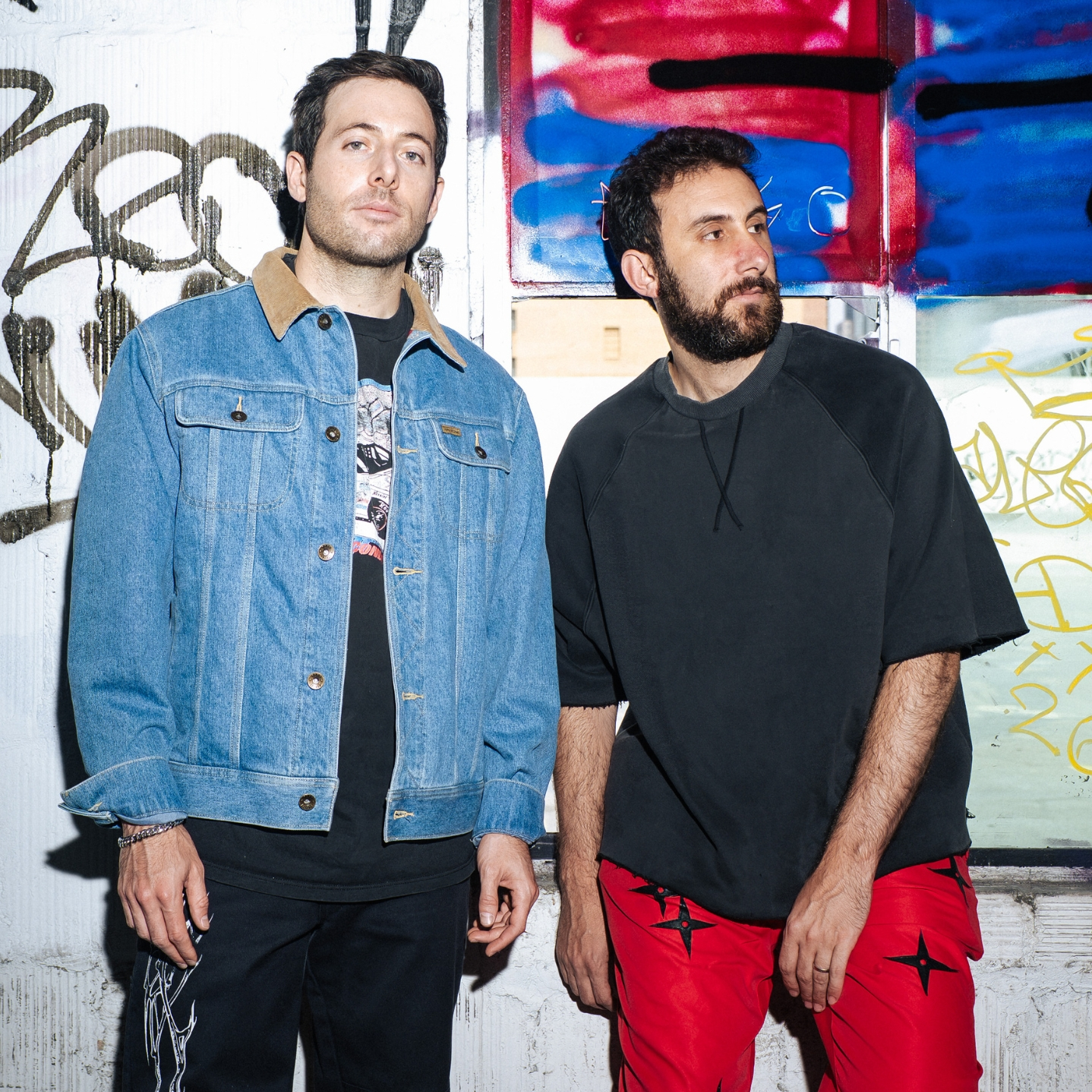

Background information
- Genres: Dance-pop; progressive house
- Years active: 2011–present
- Labels: Armada; Spinnin'
- Members: Eli Sones; Matthew Halper
- Website: www.twofriendsmusic.com

Two Friends is an American DJ/production duo made up of Eli Sones (born June 25, 1993) and Matthew Halper (born October 29, 1992). The Los Angeles-based duo gained popularity for their original discography, remixes, and hour-long "Big Bootie" mixes.

== Early life ==
Sones grew up in Los Angeles, while Halper moved around before settling into LA at the age of ten. They met each other in seventh grade while attending Brentwood School throughout their middle and high school years. At the very end of high school, the duo formed Two Friends, coming up with the name together during a Senior Seminar class they had both enrolled in. They began working on hip-hop beats in the software Pro Tools, producing for several up-and-coming rappers before pivoting towards the electronic realm. After visiting the Sahara Tent at Coachella and being slowly introduced to electronic music by some friends and family, they became even more fascinated with the emerging genre and soon dove in head-first.

Growing up, Halper had a strong background in music, starting guitar lessons at the age of eight, training in music theory, and singing in his high school choir. Traditionally his listening interests were dominated by alternative rock and rock classics such as Blink-182, Led Zeppelin, and Bon Jovi.

Sones' focus was more centralized around DJing and mashups. During high school, Sones went by the moniker "The Friendly Giant" before linking up with Halper and forming Two Friends. His early musical interests were predominantly hip-hop and indie rock.

Soon after starting to create music together, Sones moved to Nashville, Tennessee to attend Vanderbilt University and Halper to Palo Alto to attend Stanford University. Halper majored in Product Design and Sones in Human & Organizational Development, but much of their time was dedicated to the Two Friends project. For the most part, the first four years of Two Friends was long-distance; however since graduating and returning home to LA in 2015, Halper and Sones have been working the Two Friends project full-time.

== Music career ==
One of their first big opportunities came in 2014, when their remix of Lana Del Rey's "Born to Die" was added to regular rotation on SiriusXM's EDM Station BPM. Later in 2014, they released two singles with the band Breach the Summit (now known as Armors) titled "Our Names in Lights" and "Long Way Home".

Their next originals came in 2016 with "Forever" and "Overdose" on Armada Music, both amassing millions of plays throughout Spotify, SoundCloud and other streaming services. In 2016 the musical group toured more vigorously than ever before, playing frequently across North America.

Their second and most popular EP "Out of Love" was released in early 2017 through Spinnin' Records, featuring what would become two of their most popular songs, "Out Of Love" and "Pacific Coast Highway". They subsequently embarked on the “Out Of Love Tour” in the beginning of 2017. The remainder of 2017 saw the releases “Emily”, “While We’re Dreaming” and “Just A Kid”, with the accompanying tours including shows at major venues and festivals such as Electric Forest Festival, Terminal 5, and more.

The duo has amassed over twenty-seven #1 tracks on Hype Machine, as well as garnered praise from The Chainsmokers, who named them "Most Underrated Artist" in a 2017 Reddit Thread. They have recently undertaken official remixes for artists such as Steve Aoki, Louis Tomlinson, Audien, 3lau, Vicetone and many more.

In 2022, the duo departed on the 35-city Adventureland Tour, selling out venues such as Aragon Ballroom in Chicago, three nights at Terminal 5, and two nights at Echostage, to name a few.

To acknowledge ten years of Big Bootie mixes, Two Friends produced a concert called Big Bootie Land, held in Boston on October 14 and 15, 2022, to a crowd of over 12,000.

2022 brought about the release of singles such as "Wish You Were Here" featuring John K, "Chloe" featuring Jutes, "Graduated" featuring Bryce Vine, and many more.

Two Friends performed at the 22nd Coachella Valley Music and Arts Festival in April 2023. Immediately following Coachella, they departed on their biggest run to-date, The Planet Two Friends Tour.

Their 2023 Planet Two Friends tour took them to the biggest venues of their touring career to date. Two Friends performed at iconic venues across North America such as Red Rocks, Northerly Island, and Forest Hills Stadium as part of their 25-date tour. The centerpiece of the Planet Two Friends tour, a spaceship-DJ-booth hybrid creation, was debuted at their Coachella performance one month prior. Over 100,000 tickets were bought by fans attending the Planet Two Friends.

Two of their bigger songs to date, "More Than Yesterday" with Russell Dickerson and "If Only I" with Loud Luxury and Bebe Rexha were released during the Planet Two Friends Tour.

Big Bootie Mix Volume 23 was premiered at Big Bootie Land Chicago on June 2, 2023, at Huntington Bank Pavilion on Northerly Island.

At the start of 2023, Two Friends began their first Las Vegas residency. The DJs play at the Wynn and Encore Hotel properties, with performances at XS Nightclub and Encore Beach Club throughout the year.

Following their 2023 successes, the duo significantly expanded their live presence by taking their "Big Bootie Land" event concept to iconic arenas across the country. This included headlining shows at Madison Square Garden in New York City, the Kia Forum in Los Angeles, and a dedicated edition in Seattle. Their national footprint also continued to grow with prominent mainstage performances at major music festivals, including Bonnaroo and Lollapalooza.

In 2025, Two Friends embarked on their nationwide Heatwave Tour. Throughout the year, they released a steady stream of collaborative singles, including "Way It Was" featuring Quinn XCII, "No One Else" featuring Corbyn Besson, and "Trouble" featuring maryjo. They also secured an official remix release for Neil Diamond's classic "Sweet Caroline."

The duo transitioned into their "Big Boots" era in 2026, announcing the upcoming Big Boots EP alongside crossover singles like "Under The Table" featuring Chris Lane and "I Need Tomorrow" featuring Jake Banfield. Further expanding their festival-style events, they announced the first annual "Big Boots Land," a distinct headline show slated to take place in Nashville, Tennessee, in December 2026.

In May 2026, the duo also scheduled a return to Chicago for a new edition of Big Bootie Land to officially premiere Big Bootie Mix Volume 27.

Two Friends are represented by Creative Artists Agency.

== Radio show ==
In 2012, Two Friends debuted their mix series Friendly Sessions, which feature thirty minutes of their favorite songs across the dance realm alongside a thirty-minute guest mix from producers and DJs. Friendly Sessions has featured acts such as Louis the Child, Loud Luxury, Matoma and more.

The Big Bootie Mixes are syndicated on multiple channels on SiriusXM, including BPM and Soul Cycle Radio.

== Discography ==
=== Extended plays ===
| Title | Details |
|---|---|
| You (Me) | Released: February 5, 2013; Label: Lovenest Records; Format: Digital download |
| Out of Love | Released: February 24, 2017; Label: Source, Spinnin'; Format: Digital download |
| Useless | Released: June 11, 2021; Label: Self-released; Format: Digital download |
| Big Boots EP | Released: May 8, 2026; Label: Self-released; Format: Digital download |

=== Singles ===
| Title | Year | Peak chart positions | Album |
| Title | Year | US Dance | Album |
|---|---|---|---|
| "Feel Me" (featuring Priyanka Atreya) | 2013 | — | You (Me) EP |
| "Your Song" (featuring I Am Lightyear) | 2013 | — | You (Me) EP |
| "Sedated" (featuring Jeff Sontag) | 2013 | — | Non-album singles |
| "Brighter" (featuring Jeff Sontag and I Am Lightyear) | 2014 | — | Non-album singles |
| "Our Names in Lights" (featuring Breach the Summit) | 2014 | — | Non-album singles |
| "Long Way Home" (featuring Breach the Summit) | 2014 | — | Non-album singles |
| "Forever" (featuring Ktpearl) | 2016 | — | Non-album singles |
| "Overdose" (with Exit Friendzone featuring Natalola) | 2016 | — | Non-album singles |
| "Emily" (featuring James Delaney) | 2017 | — | Non-album singles |
| "Pacific Coast Highway" (featuring Max) | 2017 | — | Out of Love EP |
| "Out of Love" (featuring Cosmos & Creature) | 2017 | — | Out of Love EP |
| "Mona Lisa Eyes" | 2017 | — | Out of Love EP |
| "While We're Dreaming" (featuring Kevin Writer) | 2017 | — | Non-album singles |
| "Just a Kid" (featuring Kevin Writer) | 2017 | — | Non-album singles |
| "Bandaid" | 2018 | — | Non-album singles |
| "With My Homies" (featuring Juscova and James Delaney) | 2018 | — | Non-album singles |
| "Take It Off" | 2019 | — | Non-album singles |
| "Dollar Menu" (featuring Dani Poppitt) | 2019 | — | Non-album singles |
| "Good For You" (featuring Juscova) | 2019 | — | Non-album singles |
| "No Drama" (featuring Kid Quill and New Beat Fund) | 2020 | — | Non-album singles |
| "Looking at You" (featuring Sam Vesso) | 2020 | — | Non-album singles |
| "Hell" | 2020 | — | Non-album singles |
| "Last Day" (featuring Josie Dunne) | 2021 | — | Useless EP |
| "This Will Be My Year" (featuring Point North) | 2021 | — | Useless EP |
| "Useless" (featuring Emily Vaughn) | 2021 | — | Useless EP |
| "Love Love" (with Ferris) | 2021 | — | Non-album singles |
| "Life's Too Short" (with Fitz) | 2021 | — | Non-album singles |
| "Wish You Were Here" (featuring John K) | 2022 | — | Non-album singles |
| "Timebomb" (featuring Mod Sun) | 2022 | — | Non-album singles |
| "Chloe" (featuring Jutes) | 2022 | — | Non-album singles |
| "Graduated" (featuring Bryce Vine) | 2022 | — | Non-album singles |
| "Hate Me" (featuring Billy Lockett) | 2022 | — | Non-album singles |
| "No Saving Us" (featuring Saygrace) | 2023 | — | Non-album singles |
| "More Than Yesterday" (with Russell Dickerson) | 2023 | 35 | Non-album singles |
| "If Only I" (with Loud Luxury featuring Bebe Rexha) | 2023 | 16 | Non-album singles |
| "Wrong Way" (with Alexander Stewart) | 2024 | — | Non-album singles |
| "The Way It Is" (with Cheat Codes) | 2024 | — | Non-album singles |
| "All For Me" (featuring HRVY) | 2024 | — | Non-album singles |
| "No One Else" (featuring Corbyn Besson) | 2025 | — | Non-album singles |
| "Way It Was" (featuring Quinn XCII) | 2025 | — | Non-album singles |
| "Trouble" (featuring maryjo) | 2025 | — | Non-album singles |
| "Waiting 4 U" (featuring Natalie Jane) | 2025 | — | Non-album singles |
| "I Need Tomorrow" (featuring Jake Banfield) | 2026 | — | Big Boots EP |
| "Under The Table" (featuring Chris Lane) | 2026 | — | Big Boots EP |
"—" denotes a recording that did not chart or was not released in that territory.

=== Remixes ===
2012

- John de Sohn featuring Andreas Moe – "Long Time" (Two Friends Remix)
- I Am Lightyear – "Lose Myself" (Two Friends Remix)
- Chase & Status featuring Delilah – "Time" (Two Friends Remix)

2013

- James Egbert – "Back to New" (Two Friends Remix)
- Mutrix featuring Charity Vance – "Come Alive" (Two Friends Remix)
- Slap The Bag and Mapp featuring Katie Pearlman - Take The Sky (Two Friends Remix)
- Blondfire – "Where The Kids Are" (Two Friends Remix)
- Quintino and Alvaro – "World in Our Hands" (Two Friends Remix)

2014

- Lana Del Rey – "Born to Die" (Two Friends Remix)
- RAC featuring Matthew Koma – "Cheap Sunglasses" (Two Friends Remix)
- Urban Cone – "Sadness Disease" (Two Friends Remix)

2015

- Vicetone – "Angels" (Two Friends Remix)
- Echosmith – "Cool Kids" (Gazzo and Two Friends Remix)
- Tori Kelly – "Expensive" (Two Friends Remix)
- Alesso featuring Roy English – "Cool" (Two Friends Remix)
- Milky Chance – "Flashed Junk Mind" (Two Friends Remix)
- Blink 182 – "I Miss You" (Two Friends Remix)
- The Chainsmokers featuring ROZES – "Roses" (Two Friends Remix)
- Dropout – "Slowly" (Two Friends Remix)
- Fetty Wap featuring Adriana Gomez – "Trap Queen" (Two Friends and Instrum 'Trap King Cover')

2016

- Vicetone featuring Cosmos and Creature – "Bright Side" (Two Friends Remix)
- The Chainsmokers featuring Halsey – "Closer" (Two Friends x Class and Clowns Remix)
- Tove Lo – "Cool Girl" (Two Friends Remix)
- Shaun Frank and KSHMR featuring Delaney Jane – "Heaven" (Two Friends Remix)
- Blink-182 – "I Miss You" (Two Friends and Schoolz VIP Remix)
- Pegboard Nerds featuring Johnny Graves – "Just Like That" (Two Friends Remix)
- MAX – "Lights Down Low" (Two Friends Remix)
- The Killers – "Mr. Brightside" (Two Friends Remix)
- Galantis – "No Money" (Two Friends Remix)
- Audien featuring Lady Antebellum – "Something Better" (Two Friends Remix)
- Mako – "Way Back Home" (Two Friends Remix)

2017

- The Chainsmokers – "Break Up Every Night" (Two Friends Remix)
- Audien and 3lau – "Hot Water" (Two Friends Remix)
- KYLE featuring Lil Yachty – "iSpy" (Two Friends Remix)
- Steve Aoki and Louis Tomlinson – "Just Hold On" (Two Friends Remix)
- MGMT – "Kids" (Two Friends Remix)
- Passion Pit – "Sleepyhead" (Two Friends Remix)

2018

- Charlie Puth – "How Long" (Two Friends Remix)
- Dua Lipa – "IDGAF" (Two Friends Remix)
- Kanye West – "Touch The Sky" (Two Friends Remix)
- Red Hot Chili Peppers – "Otherside" (Two Friends Remix)

2019

- Panic! at the Disco – "High Hopes" (Two Friends Remix)
- Blink-182 – "All the Small Things" (Two Friends Remix)

2021

- Fitz – "Head Up High" (Two Friends Remix)

2025

- Neil Diamond – "Sweet Caroline" (Two Friends Remix)
