= Battista's Hole in the Wall =

- Interactive map of Battista's Hole in the Wall

Restaurant information
- Established: 1970
- Location: 4041 Linq Lane, Las Vegas, Nevada
- Coordinates: 36°6′55″N 115°10′6″W

The Battista's Hole in the Wall is a famous Italian restaurant located just east of the Las Vegas Strip in Paradise, Nevada. The restaurant opened circa 1970, along with the Stage Coach Casino next door, and later became a staple of Las Vegas restaurants. Randy Mark has owned the restaurant and casino next to it since 1975.

== History ==
Battitsta Locatelli immigrated to the United States from Italy in 1949, He performed in his workplaces, where he also began to rub elbows with famous people (this explains the numerous photographs of famous people hanging on the walls of his restaurant).

In 1970, Battista opened the bar and restaurant, which became Battista's Hole in the Wall. The restaurant also saw the Las Vegas Strip transform into a global tourist destination, with high rise hotels rising around it.

== Popularity ==
The restaurant has become a local landmark of Las Vegas restaurants, An estimated 4 million photos of Las Vegas celebrities have decorated the interior of the restaurant.

== See also ==
•Sinatra (restaurant)

•Sartiano's (restaurant)
