= Volcán (Mexican dish) =

- A volcán with al pastor
- Type: Mexican street food
- Place of origin: Mexico
- Associated cuisine: Mexican cuisine
- Main ingredients: Corn tortilla, cheese, meat, salsa
- Variations: Beef, pork, chicken, vegetarian
- Similar dishes: Taco, tostada, vampiro, lorenza

A volcán is a traditional Mexican street food dish consisting of a corn tortilla toasted until crisp and topped with ingredients such as melted cheese, meat, and salsa. It is served open-faced, unlike a conventional taco, and is commonly prepared at taquerias in Mexico.

The dish is found in different regions of Mexico, particularly Mexico City and Jalisco. It is closely related to dishes known as vampiros in Sinaloa and lorenzas in Sonora.

== Preparation ==
A volcán is prepared by toasting a corn tortilla on a comal or grill until it becomes crisp. In some preparations, the edges of the tortilla curl upward, creating a slightly concave surface.

Melted cheese and other ingredients are placed on top of the tortilla. Varieties include volcanes made with al pastor, grilled beef, pork ribs, chorizo, chicken, and suadero. Vegetarian versions are also available, including preparations made with cheese and beans.

Unlike some varieties of tostada, which are made by frying a tortilla in oil, a volcán may obtain its crisp texture through prolonged toasting on a hot cooking surface.

Some taquerias also offer volcanes topped with shrimp, suckling pig, or adobada, and the cheese may be omitted.

Volcanes can also be served inside a torta with pastor negro, a variation of al pastor pork.

== Name ==
The Spanish word volcán translates to "volcano" in English. The name refers to the appearance of the dish, as the toasted tortilla may curl upward to resemble a crater, while the toppings form a mound resembling a mountain. Melted cheese, meat, and salsa have also been compared to the appearance of an erupting volcano.

== History ==
The precise origin of the volcán has not been conclusively established but was documented in food publications before the 2020s.

In February 2022, the newspaper Expreso de Tamaulipas published an interview with taquero Alejandro Lozano Méndez of Ciudad Victoria, Tamaulipas. Lozano claimed to have invented a preparation called the volcán in that city. He described combining a toasted tortilla with meat, cheese, and other ingredients commonly used in tacos.

== See also ==
- Mexican street food
- List of Mexican dishes
