= Blush Boutique Nightclub =

Vegas nightclub

Coordinates: 36.1293°N 115.1662°W

- Interactive map of Blush Boutique Nightclub
- Address: 3131 Las Vegas Blvd South; Las Vegas, Nevada 89109; United States
- Location: Las Vegas Strip

Construction
- Opened: 2007
- Closed: 2011

Website
- Official website

Blush Boutique Nightclub was a nightclub located in the Wynn Las Vegas on the Las Vegas Strip. It was the first boutique nightclub in Las Vegas. It opened Labor Day Weekend 2007 and closed in September 2011.

== History ==
Casino developer Stephen A. Wynn and night club operator Sean Christie created Blush Boutique Nightclub in 2007.

Prior to partnering with Wynn Las Vegas, Christie was a founding member and managing partner of The Light Group. He was also part of The Lyons Group which owns and operates more than 30 nightclub venues on the East coast.

Formerly the location of Lure, the venue was completely remodeled under the direction of Wynn's Executive Vice President of Design Roger Thomas.

The club hosted acts such as Flo Rida. In 2009, a "champagne bottle-buying contest" between basketballer Kobe Bryant and professional poker player Antonio Esfandiari took place in the club, with Bryant's winning $21,000 bill hitting national tabloid news.

== Description ==
The 4,500-square-foot (420 m^{2}) club featured a lit onyx dance floor and a lantern ceiling sculpture. The lighting and sound system was designed by John Lyons, winner of the World Club Award.
