= Sean Christie =

American CEO (born 1974)

Sean Christie (born April 21, 1974) is a hospitality entrepreneur who is co-founder and CEO of Carver Road Capital. Previous roles include events and nightlife president of MGM Resorts International; EVP of business development for Wynn Resorts; and COO and vice-president of operations at Wynn Las Vegas, where he was the managing partner of Encore Beach Club, Surrender Night Club, and Andrea's Restaurant.

== Career ==
=== Boston years ===
Christie began his career in nightlife and hospitality in 1993, working for Lyons Group in Boston. There, he managed and promoted Karma Club, Bill's Bar and Lounge, and Avalon.

=== Las Vegas entrepreneur ===
In 2000, Christie relocated to Las Vegas, Nevada, to assist in the opening and management of House of Blues at Mandalay Bay. From 2001 to 2006, he was also a managing partner of The Light Group, a hospitality development and management company with Las Vegas entertainment venues Jet and Light, lounges Mist and Caramel, and restaurants Stack and Fix.

In 2006, he founded Las Vegas Nightlife Group, an entertainment consulting firm; clients included CityCenter Las Vegas; Bare Pool Lounge at The Mirage Hotel and Casino; and the DayDream Las Vegas Pool Club, for the M Resort, Christie's first day-club iteration.

He joined Wynn Las Vegas as a managing partner, in 2007, to create the first boutique nightclub in Las Vegas, Blush Boutique Nightclub. The following year, Wynn commissioned Christie to partner with Chef Kim Canteenwalla and Elizabeth Blau to co-create Society Café at Encore Las Vegas. In 2010, he collaborated on Encore Beach Club and Surrender Nightclub at Encore Las Vegas.

In 2012, Christie opened Andrea's Asian restaurant in Encore, adjacent to the Encore Beach Club complex, with executive chef Joseph Elevado, and was named an influential executive by Billboard. In 2013, he piloted a Wynn Las Vegas filming initiative, resulting in the property being featured in Paul Blart: Mall Cop 2, Frank and Lola and The House.

In January 2018, Christie joined MGM Resorts International as president of events and nightlife. During his tenure, he steered Juniper Cocktail Lounge, Roy Choi's restaurant concept Best Friend, On The Record Speakeasy and Club, and Mama Rabbit Mezcal + Tequila Bar at Park MGM. Christie also led the 2019 opening of the 10,000-square-foot retro-style Mayfair Supper Club at the Bellagio.

=== Carver Road Hospitality ===
In 2020, Christie partnered with real estate and marketing executive Nelson Famadas to co-found hospitality and entertainment company Carver Road Capital. The firm develops lifestyle hotels, restaurants, lounges, and other hospitality venues in the United States and internationally. Curator of its various beverage menus, mixologist Francesco Lafranconi also joined the firm that year as vice president of beverage and hospitality culture. The company has opened several nightlife venues and is an investor in Emmy Squared Pizza, with multiple locations.

Christie announced plans to open the first Carver Road venue, Flanker Kitchen + Sporting Club, in Salt Lake City in 2021. Launched that December, the 17,500-square-foot multi-concept complex features a restaurant, bars and lounges, and karaoke and golf simulator rooms. Located across from Delta Center (formerly Vivant Arena) at The Gateway, the venue was designed by DesignAgency. Subsequently, Carver Road opened a Flanker Kitchen + Sporting Club in the BetMGM Sportsbook at State Farm Stadium in Arizona, in 2022, followed by a third location at Mandalay Bay Resort, Las Vegas, in 2023.

On December 30, 2021, Carversteak opened at Resorts World Las Vegas, with a mid-century modern aesthetic. In 2022, Starchild Rooftop Bar & Lounge debuted at the Civilian Hotel in the Manhattan Theater District of New York City, with views of the Manhattan skyline. The following year, Rosevale Cocktail Room debuted in midtown Manhattan, featuring the largest vermouth collection in the US.

In 2023, the company formed a strategic partnership with Casa Playa, a coastal Mexican restaurant at Wynn Las Vegas. Seamark Seafood & Cocktails at the Wynn Resorts Encore Boston Harbor opened in 2024. A second Carversteak opened in New York City in March 2026.

== Personal life ==
Christie was born in Boston, Massachusetts, and began helping at the family restaurant in Boston at age seven. He attended Northeastern University, resides in Las Vegas, Nevada with his daughter, and cites his parents as his greatest influence. Christie is a supporter of Keep Memory Alive, a program of the non-profit Cleveland Clinic.
