= Encore Las Vegas =

Casino hotel in Paradise, Nevada

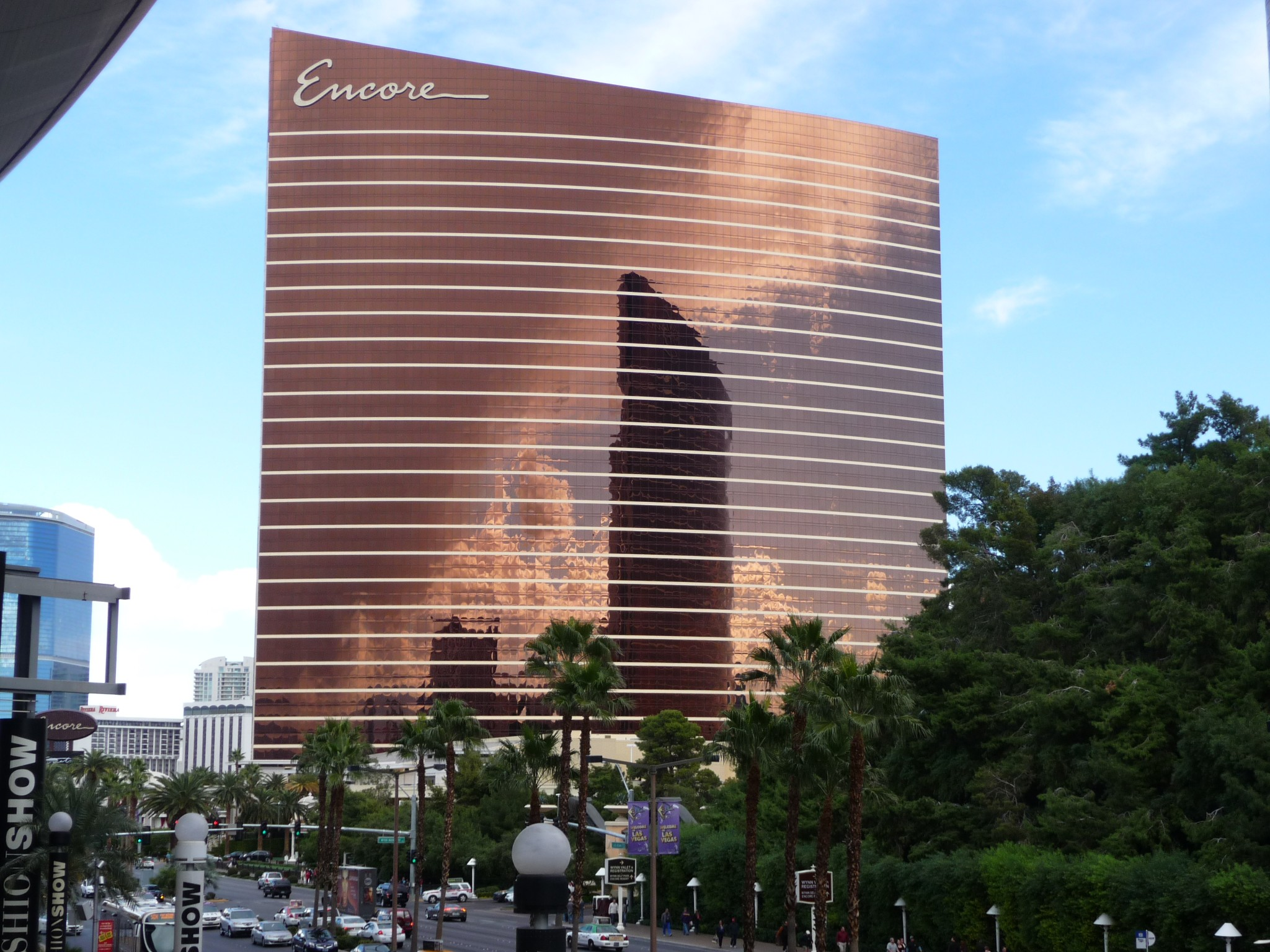

- Location within Las Vegas Strip Location within Nevada
- Interactive map of Encore Las Vegas
- Location: Paradise, Nevada, U.S.; 3121 South Las Vegas Boulevard; 36°07′39″N 115°09′58″W
- Opened: December 22, 2008; 17 years ago
- No. of rooms: 2,034
- Gaming space: 72,000 sq ft (6,700 m^{2})
- Signature attractions: Encore Beach Club; XS (nightclub)
- Notable restaurants: Casa Playa; Sinatra; Wazuzu
- Owner: Wynn Resorts
- Architect: Wimberly Allison Tong & Goo, Michael Hong
- Renovated in: 2010, 2015

Encore Las Vegas (also called Encore at Wynn Las Vegas or simply Encore) is a luxury resort, casino and hotel located on the Las Vegas Strip in Paradise, Nevada. The resort is connected to its sister resort, Wynn Las Vegas, located directly south. Both are owned by Wynn Resorts and located on the former site of the Desert Inn resort, which Steve Wynn purchased and closed in 2000. Encore took the place of two Desert Inn hotel structures, the Palms and St. Andrews towers, both demolished in 2004. Construction of Encore began on April 28, 2006, the first anniversary of Wynn Las Vegas' opening. The Encore project, built by Tutor Saliba, cost $2.3 billion. It opened on December 22, 2008.

The 48-story hotel tower includes 2,034 rooms, and the resort also offers 72,000 sq ft (6,700 m^{2}) of gaming space, as well as the Encore Esplanade retail area. In addition, it has several restaurants, including one dedicated to singer Frank Sinatra. The resort has also had several clubs, two of which were added in 2010, marking the completion of the Wynn resort complex. The property includes the Encore Theater, originally built for Wynn Las Vegas and now located in between the two resorts. The property is also home to a spa and 60,000 sq ft (5,600 m^{2}) in convention space. Encore has received numerous accolades, including the AAA Five Diamond Award and the Five Star award from Forbes Travel Guide.

== History ==
Encore is a sister property to Wynn Las Vegas, which also consists of a single hotel tower. By February 2004, owner Steve Wynn had decided to build a second tower with 1,300 rooms, for an approximate total of 4,000. This would help make the Wynn complex more competitive among other expanding resorts on the Las Vegas Strip.

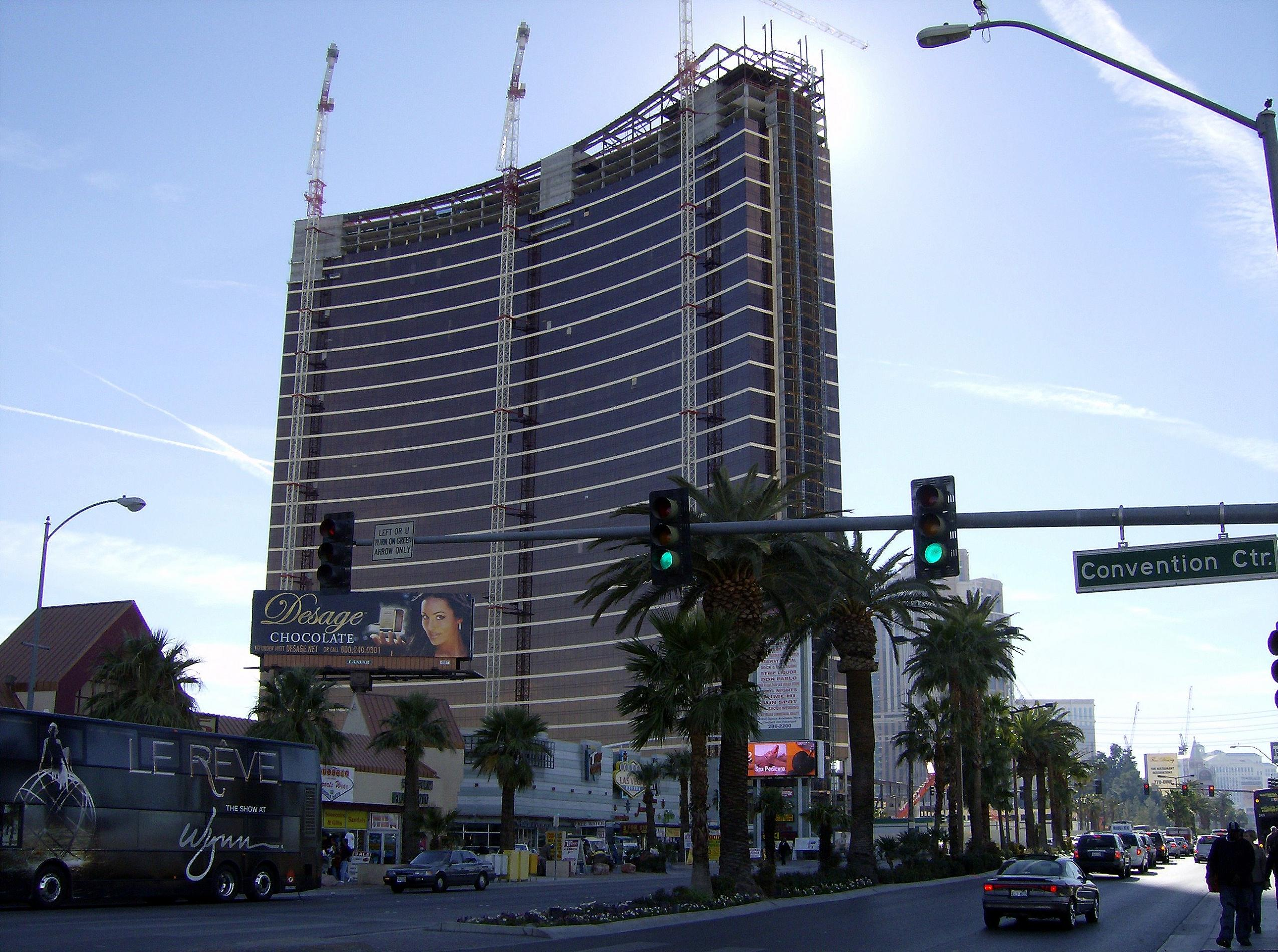
Construction of Encore's hotel tower, December 2007

The Wynn complex was built on the former site of the Desert Inn resort, which was purchased and closed by Steve Wynn in 2000. The last remaining hotel structures of the Desert Inn – the Palms and St. Andrews towers – were imploded in November 2004, making way for Encore. It was originally planned only as a hotel tower with a boutique casino, although the strength of the economy prompted Wynn to expand the project, adding restaurants and convention space, among other features. Encore would be targeted at a higher-end clientele compared with that of Wynn Las Vegas.

Wynn Resorts sold $400 million in stock to finance Encore, which cost a total of $2.3 billion. Groundbreaking took place on April 28, 2006, the first anniversary of Wynn Las Vegas' opening. Tutor Saliba, based in California, served as the general contractor. A nine-story Desert Inn parking garage, the last remainder of the resort's structures, was imploded on March 6, 2007, as construction progressed on Encore.

Encore was expected to employ more than 5,000 people, with approximately 1,400 relocating from Wynn Las Vegas. As with the original resort, Steve Wynn starred in a commercial for Encore featuring him on the roof of the new hotel's tower. The commercial was directed by Brett Ratner.

Encore opened at 8:00 p.m. on December 22, 2008. More than 1,000 people attended the opening. Due to the period's economic downturn, the opening was designed to be more subdued compared with that of previous resorts. At the opening, Steve Wynn gave high rollers a few million dollars to make the initial bets and initiated the action by declaring over a microphone, "Let the games begin!"; the start of gambling was accompanied by a recording of Frank Sinatra's "Luck Be a Lady Tonight".

The resort opened with one nightclub, and two other clubs were added in May 2010, replacing the resort's existing porte-cochere at a cost of $68 million. The project included a new pedestrian entrance and landscaping, both along the Strip. With these additions finished, Wynn declared that the $5.2 billion Wynn complex was now complete.

== Features ==
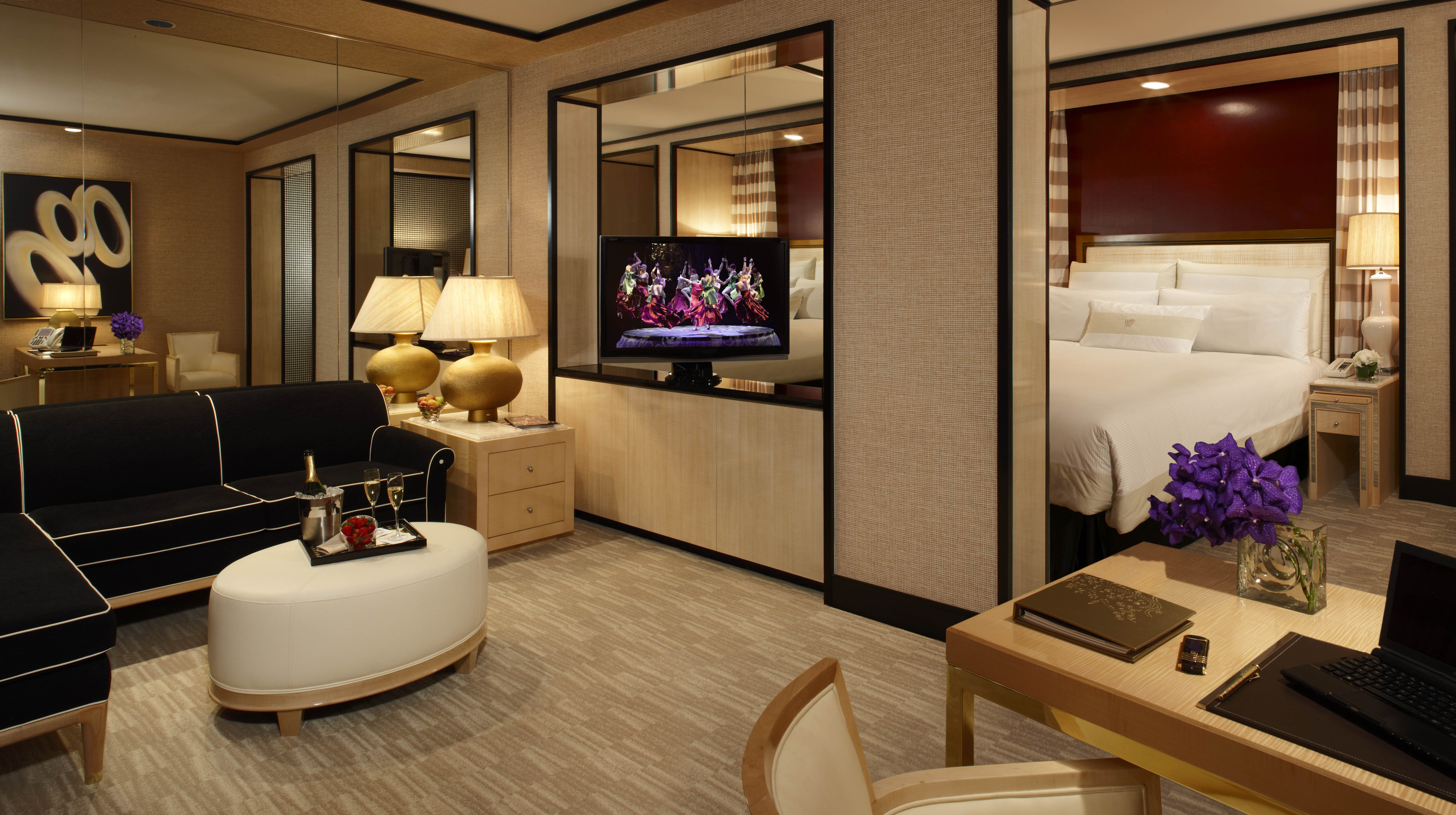
A suite at Encore

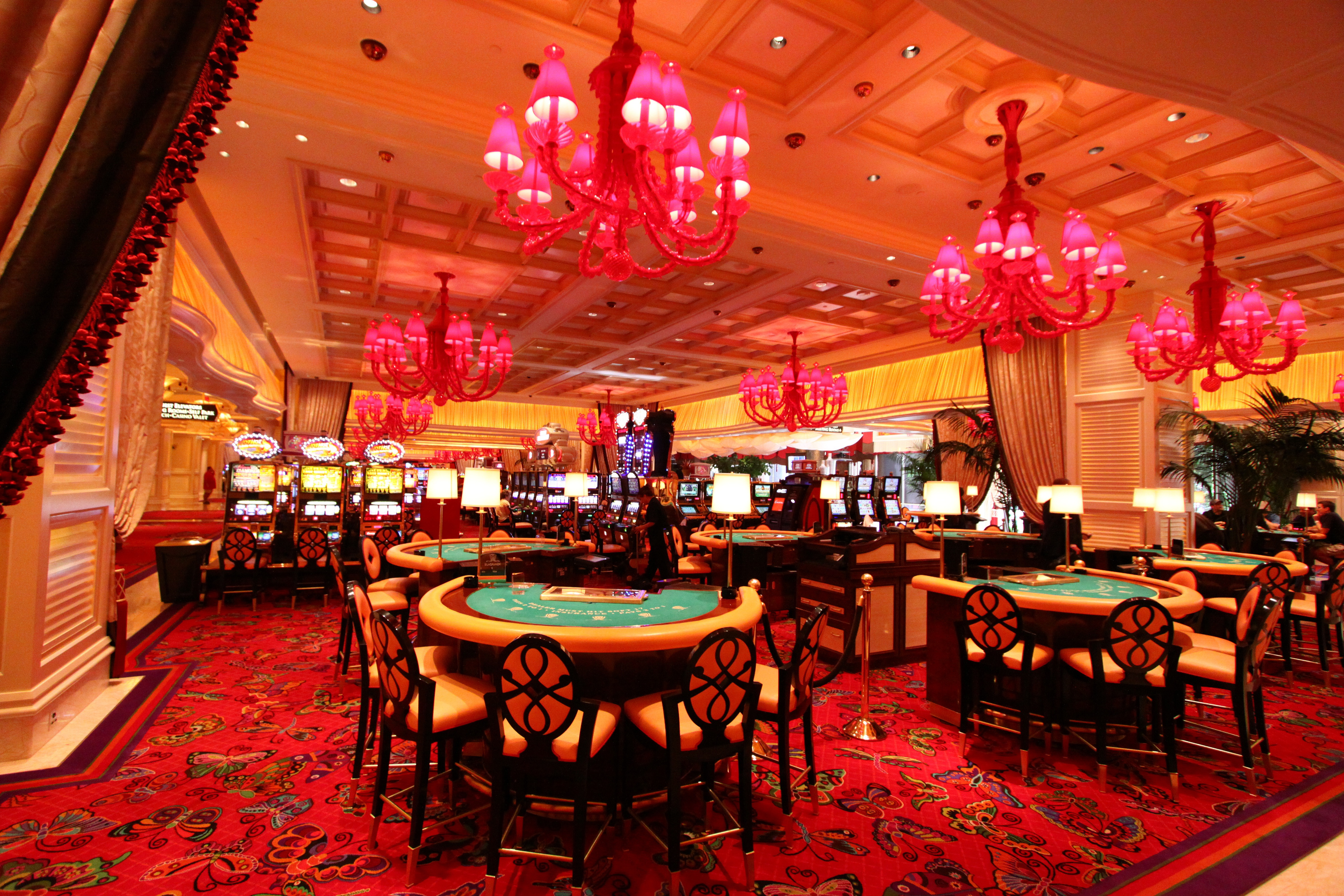
Table games

During the design phase, Wynn Resorts consulted with Forbes Travel Guide in hopes of attaining its five-star rating. Encore was designed to attract an upper-class clientele, competing with other upcoming luxury resort projects such as CityCenter and Cosmopolitan. DeRuyter Butler was the chief architect. Jerry Beale, senior vice president of design, described Encore as "the flirty younger sister" of Wynn Las Vegas. The interior design was handled by Roger Thomas, who is a butterfly enthusiast. Flower and butterfly designs are prominent throughout the resort. Thomas's passion for butterflies intrigued Wynn, prompting their inclusion in the design.

The Encore hotel tower is nearly identical to the one at Wynn Las Vegas, both using bronze glass. The Encore tower is 48 stories, although its top floor is labeled "63". Due to bad-luck superstitions among gamblers, the tower skips the 13th floor (triskaidekaphobia) and those containing the number 4 (tetraphobia). Encore opened with 2,034 hotel rooms. The rooms were remodeled in 2015, and a $200 million hotel renovation project was announced for both Wynn and Encore in 2021.

Like Wynn Las Vegas, Encore also features natural lighting in certain areas of the resort, an uncommon trait for casinos. Other notable design elements include red chandeliers above the casino floor, which contains 72,000 sq ft (6,700 m^{2}) of gaming space. Upon opening, the casino also had five gaming salons on the hotel's top floor. The salons, reserved for high rollers, offered table games such as baccarat and floor-to-ceiling views. A race and sports book was added in 2017.

The resort opened with 27,000 sq ft (2,500 m^{2}) of retail space at the Encore Esplanade, featuring upscale retailers such as Chanel, Hermes and Rock and Republic. Las Vegas' only Roberto Cavalli boutique opened at the property in 2023. Designed by Dan Barteluce, the Encore Esplanade consists of an indoor walkway connecting to Wynn Las Vegas, with lattice ceilings providing natural lighting.

The Encore opened with a 61,000 sq ft (5,700 m^{2}) spa, and includes 60,000 sq ft (5,600 m^{2}) of convention space intended for meetings, conferences and events. The space includes both ballrooms and breakout rooms.

=== Restaurants ===
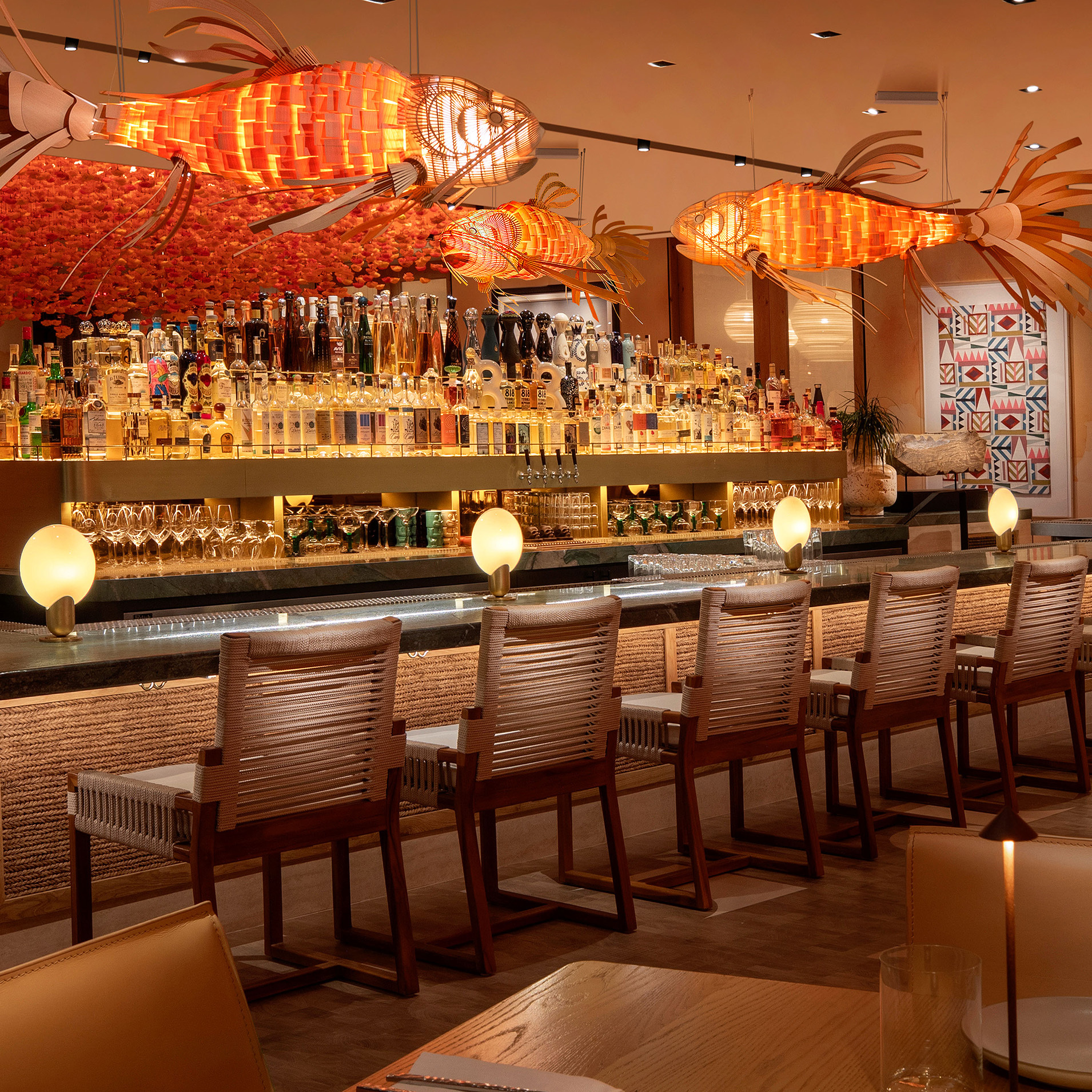
Casa Playa bar area

Encore opened with five restaurants, including Sinatra; it serves as a tribute to the singer, who was friends with Wynn. The Italian restaurant features various personal memorabilia that once belonged to Sinatra. A French restaurant, Switch, featured a rotating decor; walls would retract into the ceiling every 30 minutes, allowing for a new one to descend. Victor Drai, a nightclub operator for the Wynn complex, also opened Botero Steak, named after artist Fernando Botero. Other dining establishments included Society Cafe, and the Asian restaurant Wazuzu, the latter overseen by chef Jet Tila. Society Cafe closed in 2015, along with Botero Steak. Following a renovation, the latter reopened at the end of the year as Jardin (French for "Garden").

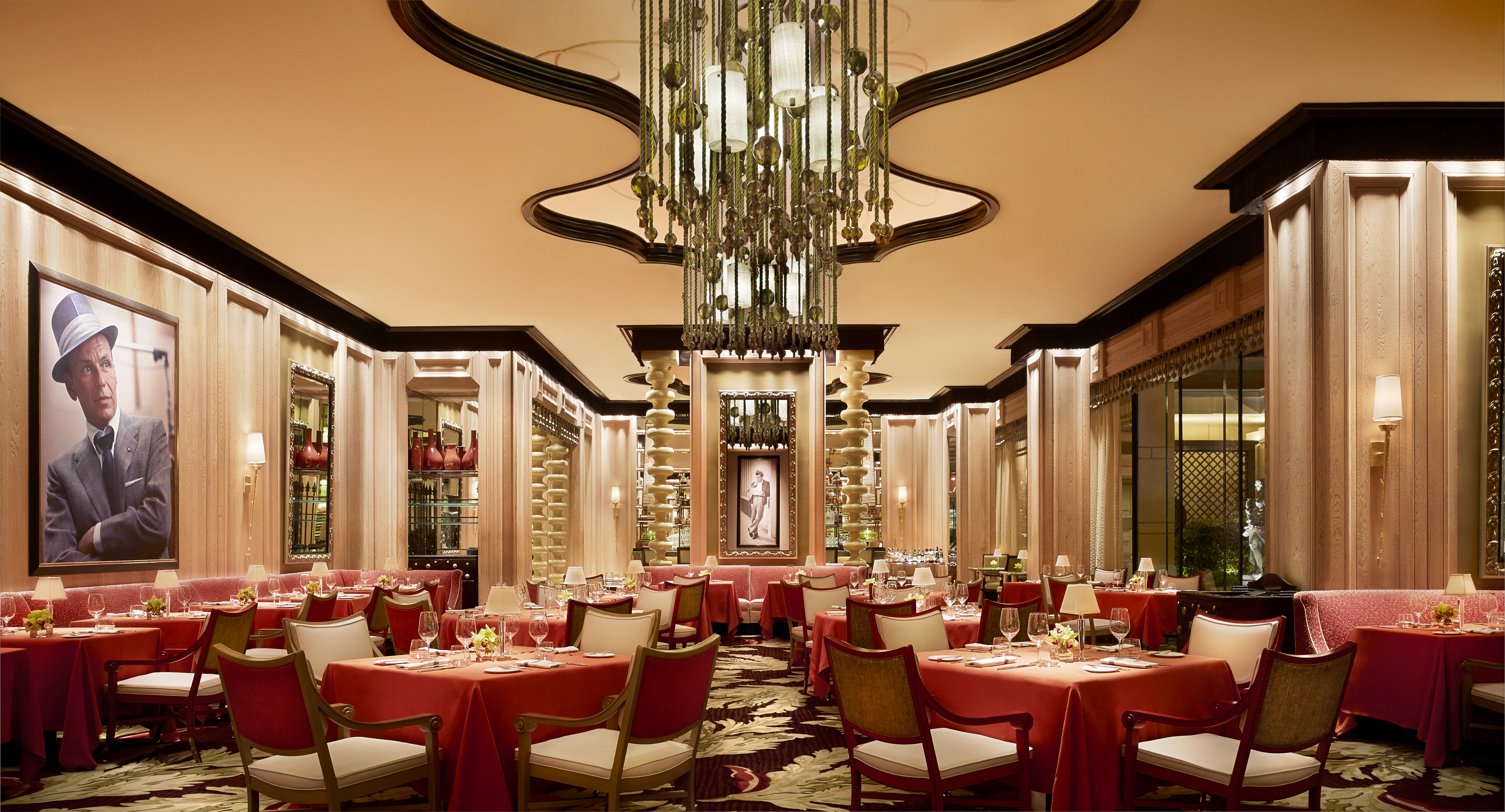
Sinatra, an Italian restaurant within Encore, as seen in 2026

Switch operated until 2012. Andrea's, an Asian restaurant and lounge named after Wynn's wife Andrea Hissom, opened in its place in 2013. The lounge area included an LED screen image of Hissom's eyes. It closed in 2020 and was replaced by Elio, marking the first Mexican restaurant for the Wynn complex. A new Mexican restaurant, Casa Playa, opened in its place the following year. Casa Playa is led by executive chef Sarah Thompson and offers a tequila and mezcal selection.

=== Clubs ===
Drai, who operated the Tryst nightclub at Wynn Las Vegas, was again recruited to run the nightclub at Encore, which eventually became known as XS nightclub. XS, measuring 40,000 sq ft (3,700 m^{2}), was designed as Encore's top attraction. It included access to a pool area which had 29 cabanas, as well as topless sunbathing.

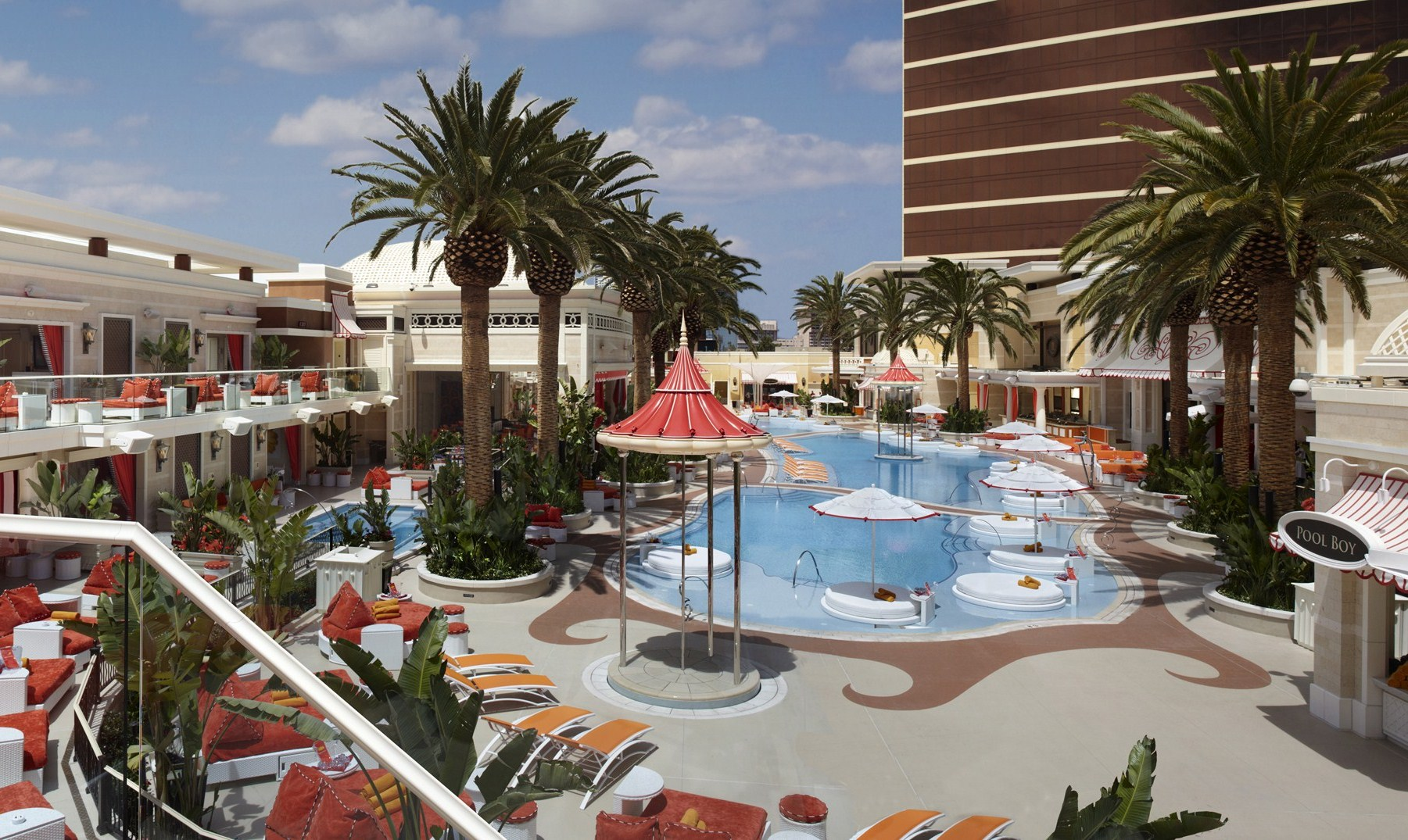
Encore Beach Club in 2010

Encore Beach Club, a 55,000 sq ft (5,100 m^{2}) pool complex for adults, opened in May 2010. It was joined by a new 5,000 sq ft (460 m^{2}) nightclub known as Surrender, which connected to the beach club. Both were managed by Sean Christie's Las Vegas Nightlife Group, which also operated the Blush nightclub at Wynn Las Vegas. XS and Surrender later became some of the top-grossing nightclubs in the United States.

In 2010, rapper Lil Jon signed a DJ residency at Surrender. Swedish DJ Alesso has also performed there and at Encore Beach Club. The Chainsmokers and Kygo each began ongoing residencies at XS in 2017. Other entertainers at the clubs have included Swedish House Mafia, country artist Dustin Lynch, and DJs Marshmello, Diplo, and RL Grime. Performing artists are managed by Jared Garcia. In 2018, the position of artist relations was taken over by David Hadden. By that time, Encore Beach Club had taken over the Surrender space.

== Shows ==
The Wynn complex has two theaters, including the Encore Theater. It was originally built as part of Wynn Las Vegas and is located between the two resorts. It has 1,480 seats, and has hosted numerous entertainers, including Danny Gans, Beyoncé, and Garth Brooks.

== Accolades ==
In a 2009 review for The New York Times, Brooks Barnes wrote, "Until the economy improves, the opulent hotel will come across a bit like a boom-times relic. But there's always a market for quality, and Encore offers that in spades". That year, Travel + Leisure named it among the 45 best new hotels. The magazine praised Encore's natural lighting and indoor plant life, stating that both features make the expansive public spaces feel "downright cozy".

At the end of 2009, Encore received the AAA Five Diamond Award, as well as the Five Star award from Forbes Travel Guide. The two spas at the Wynn complex were also the only ones in the state to have five-star ratings. The complex has since been a repeat winner of both awards. Encore is among the three largest Forbes Five-Star resorts in the world, along with Wynn Las Vegas and Wynn Palace in Macau. In 2017, readers of Condé Nast Traveler named Wynn Las Vegas and Encore as the best hotel property in the city, noting the high level of luxury.

== Gallery ==
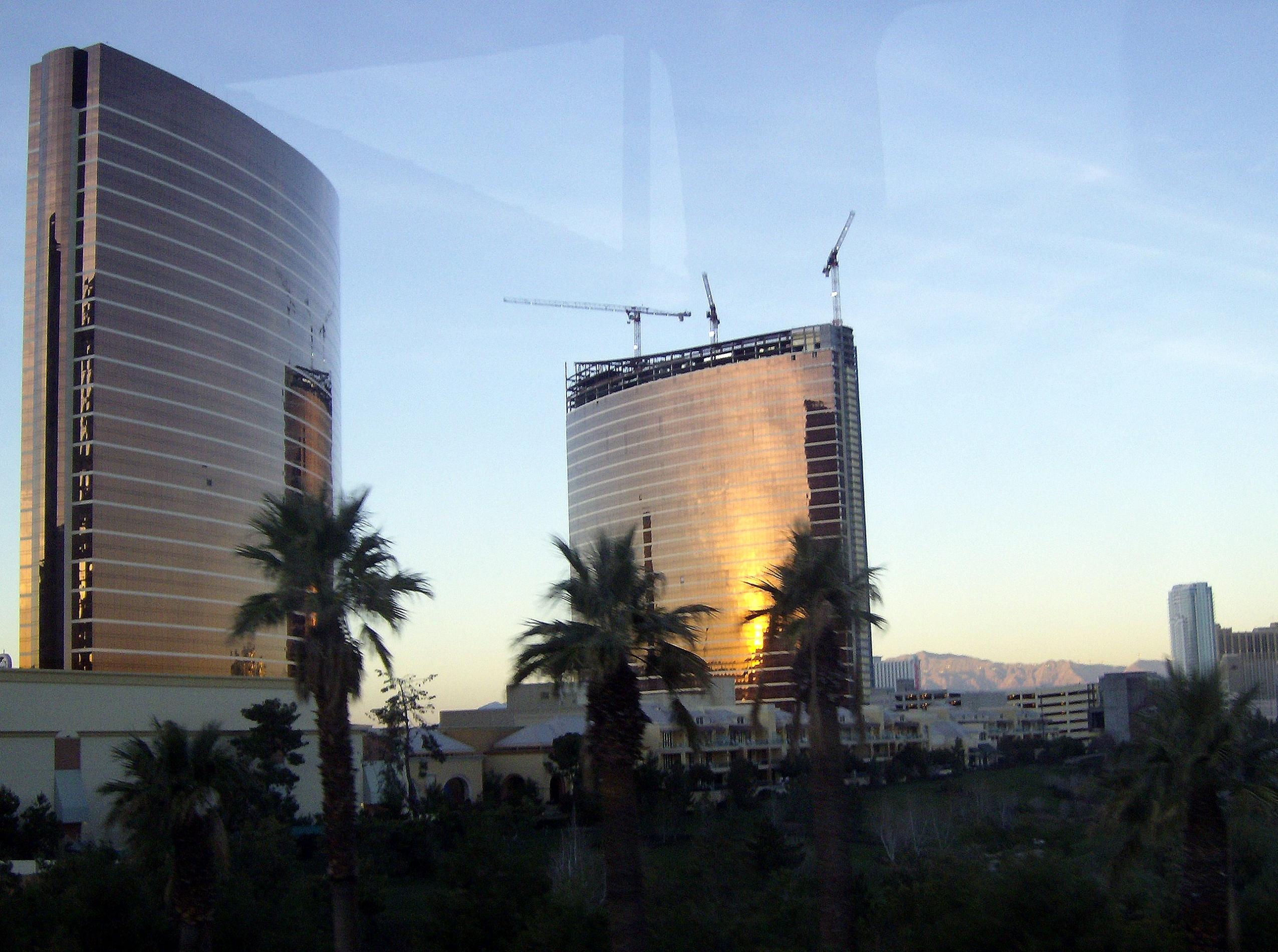
Encore during construction, January 2008

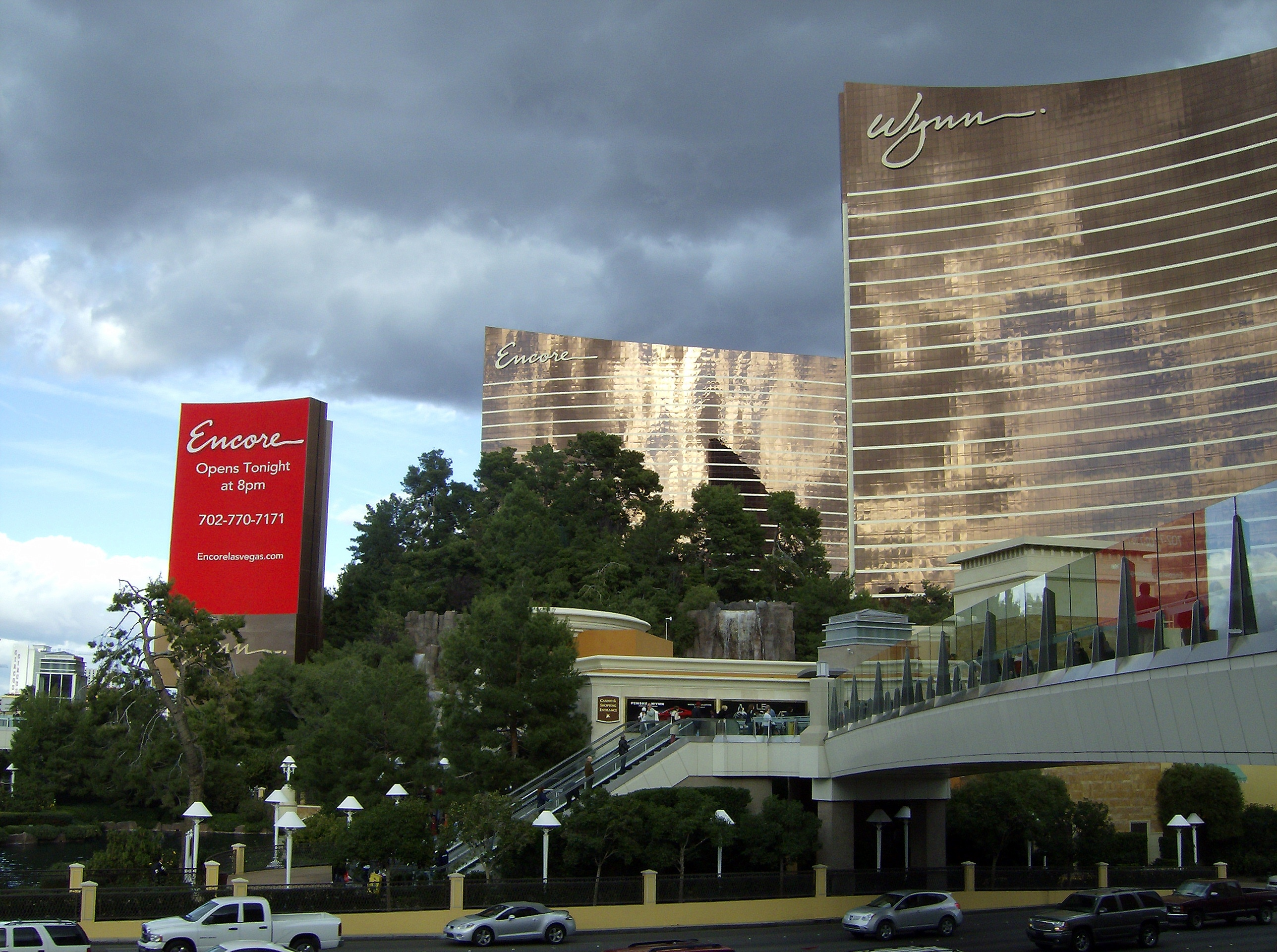
Wynn and Encore on opening day as seen from The Palazzo

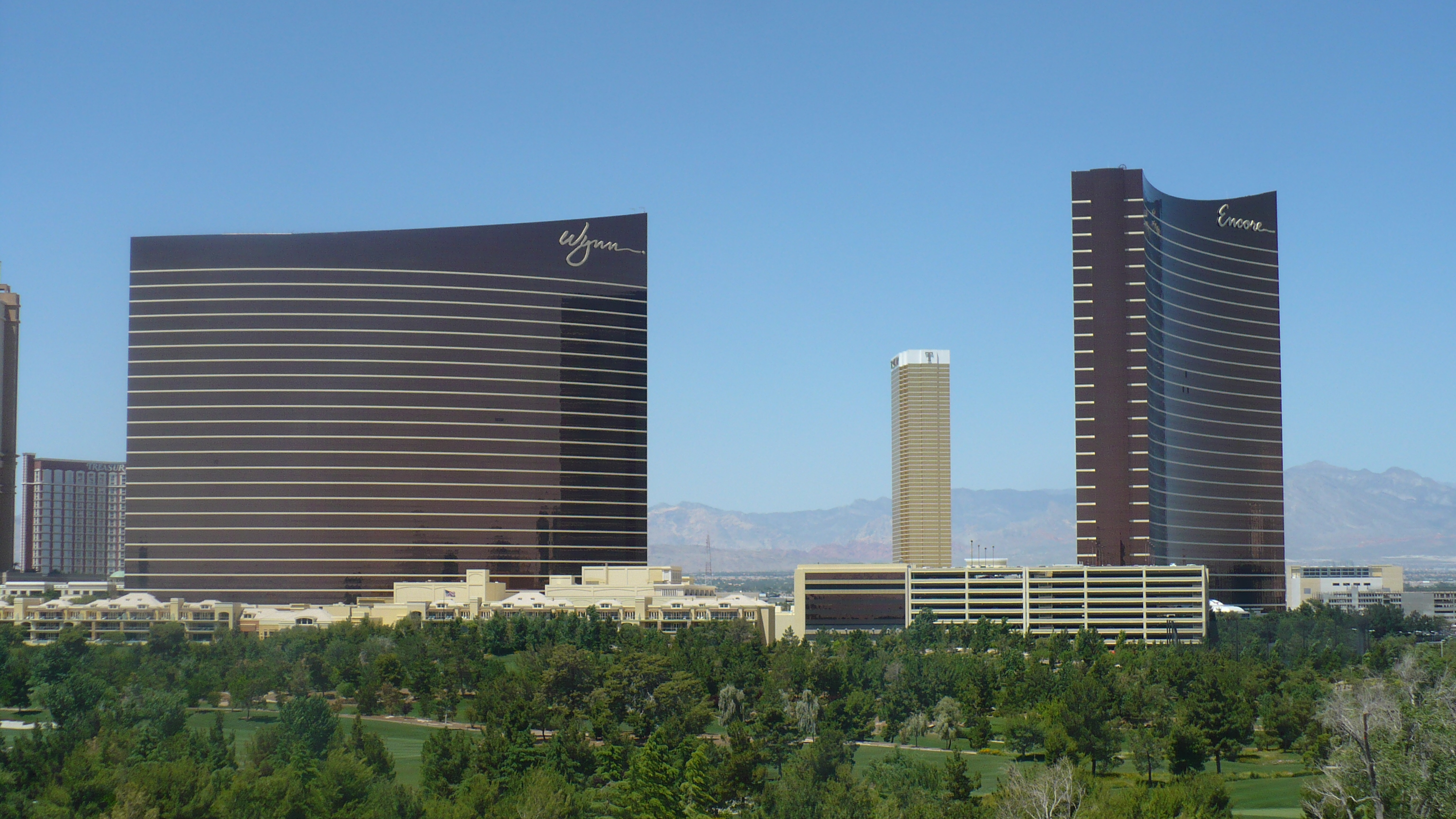
Encore and Wynn seen from the east, with Trump International Hotel Las Vegas in the center

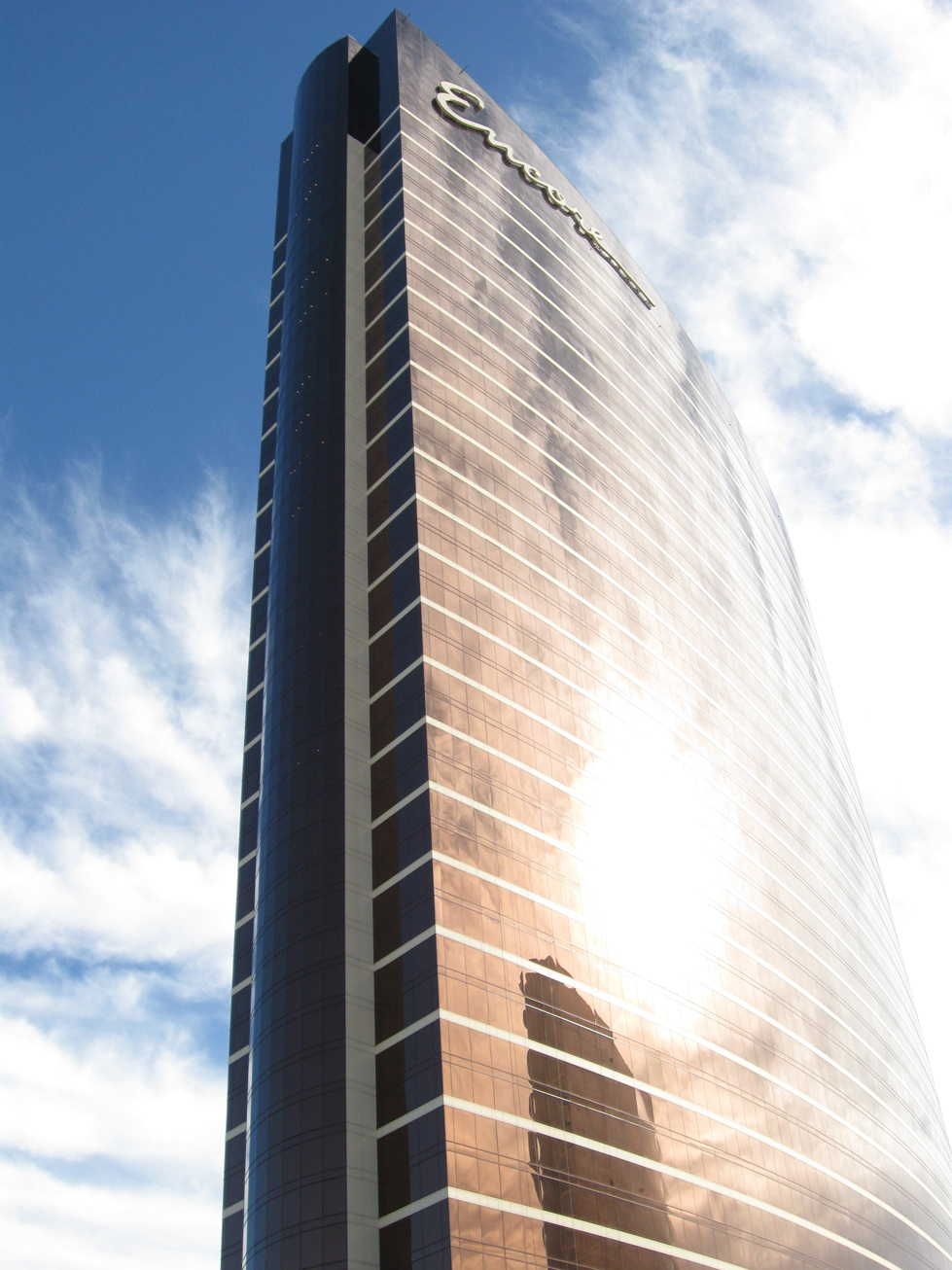
Tower view from Las Vegas Boulevard

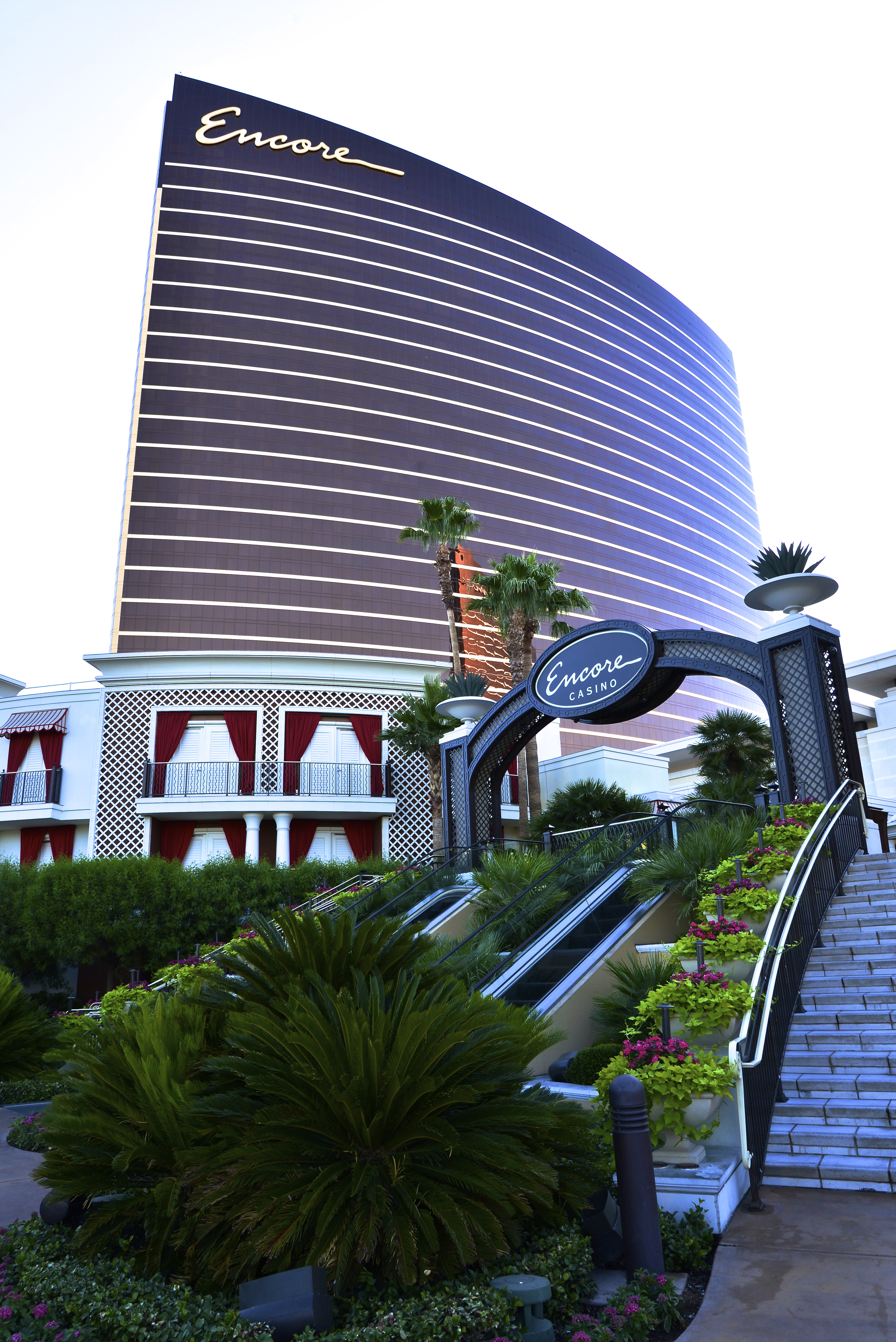
New pedestrian entrance at Encore

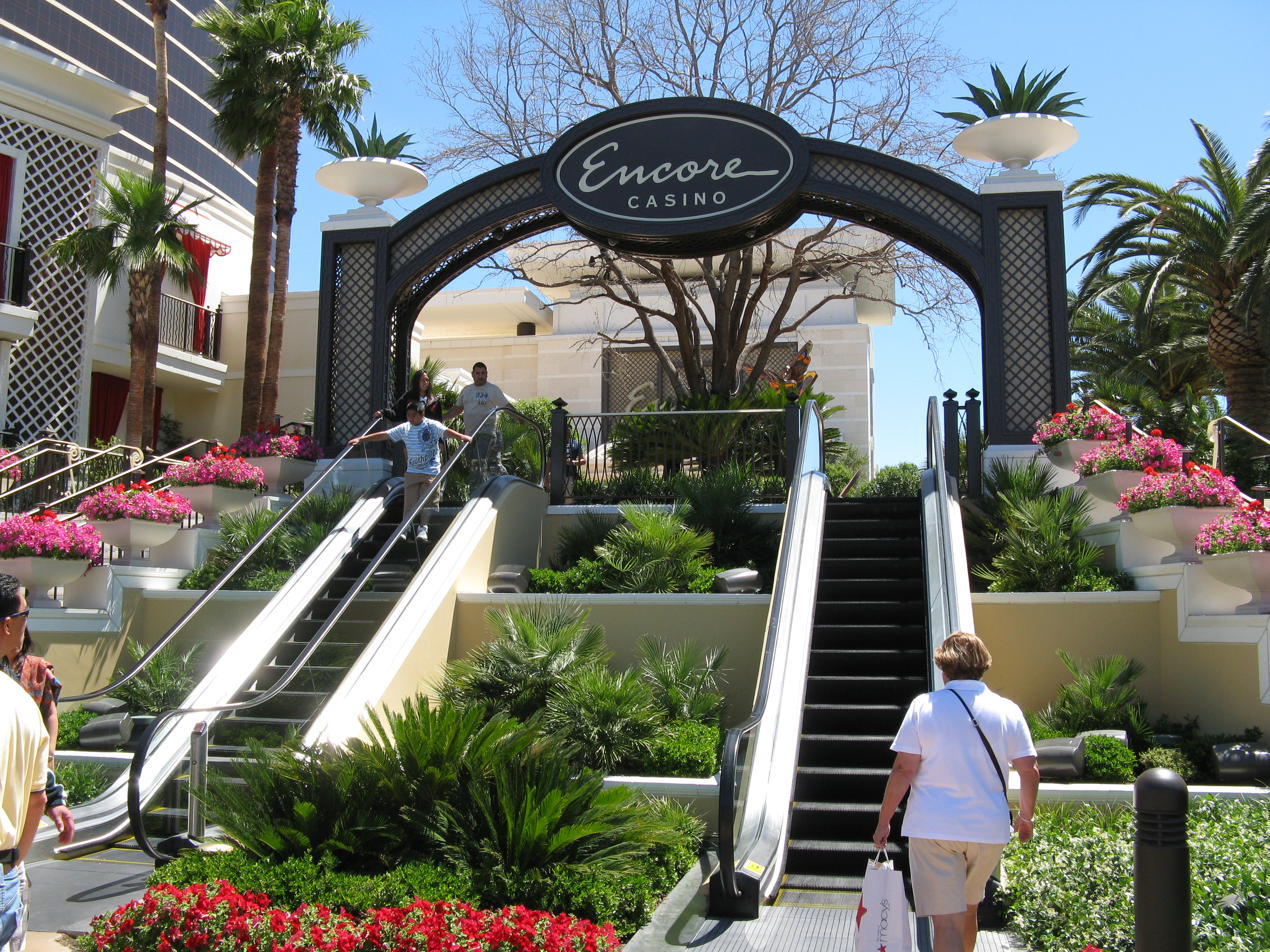
Close-up of entrance

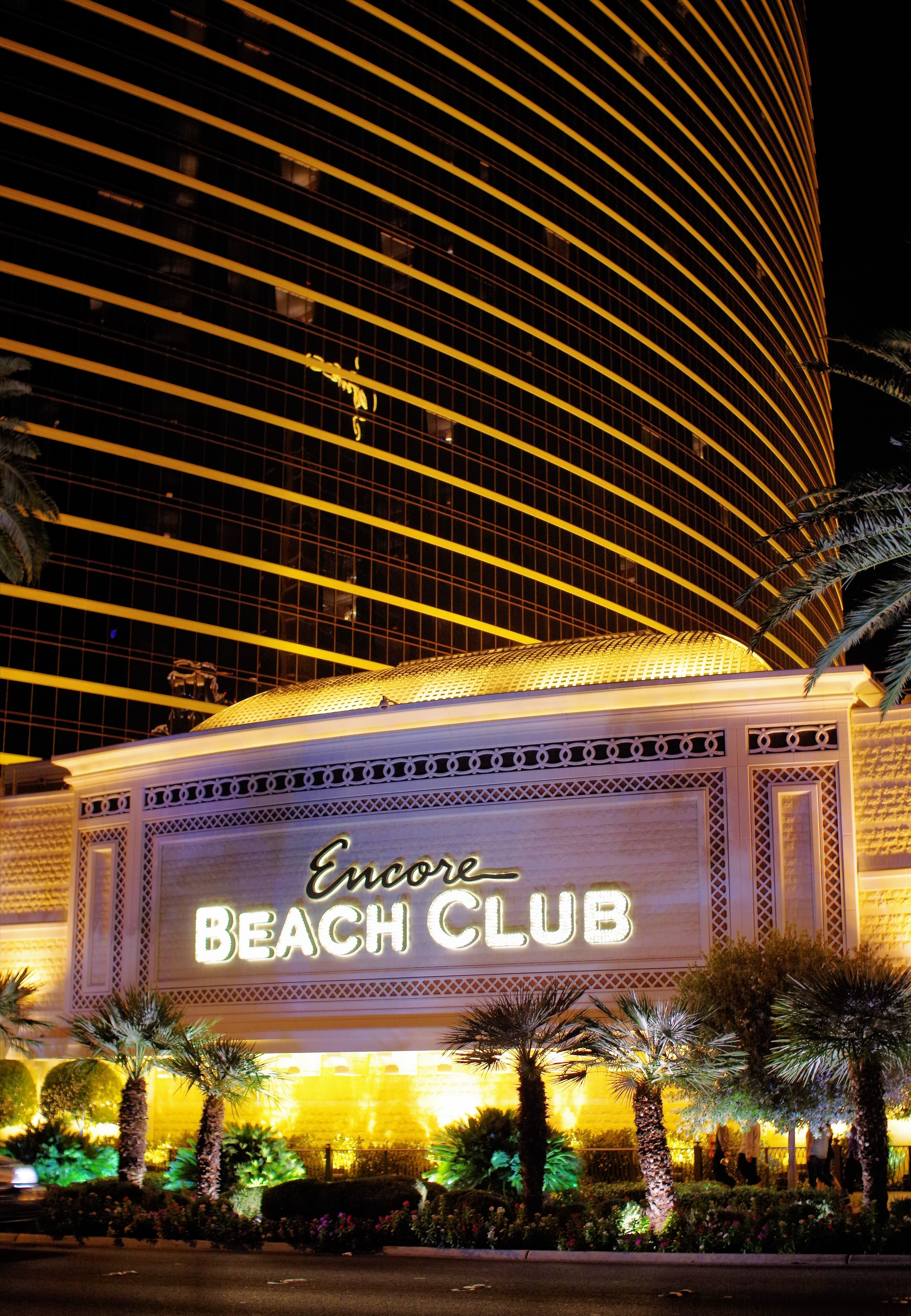
Encore Beach Club, seen from the Strip at night

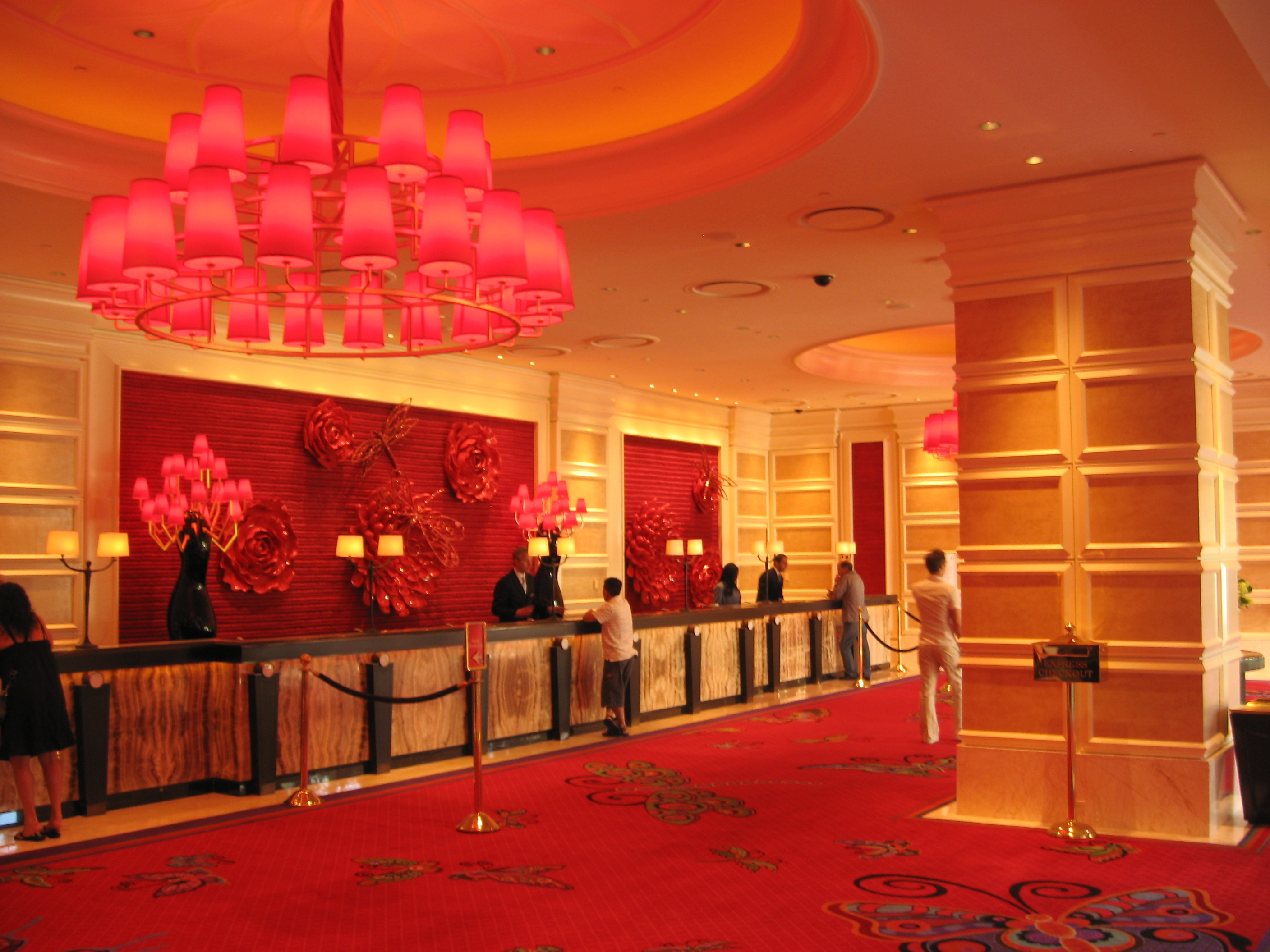
Hotel lobby

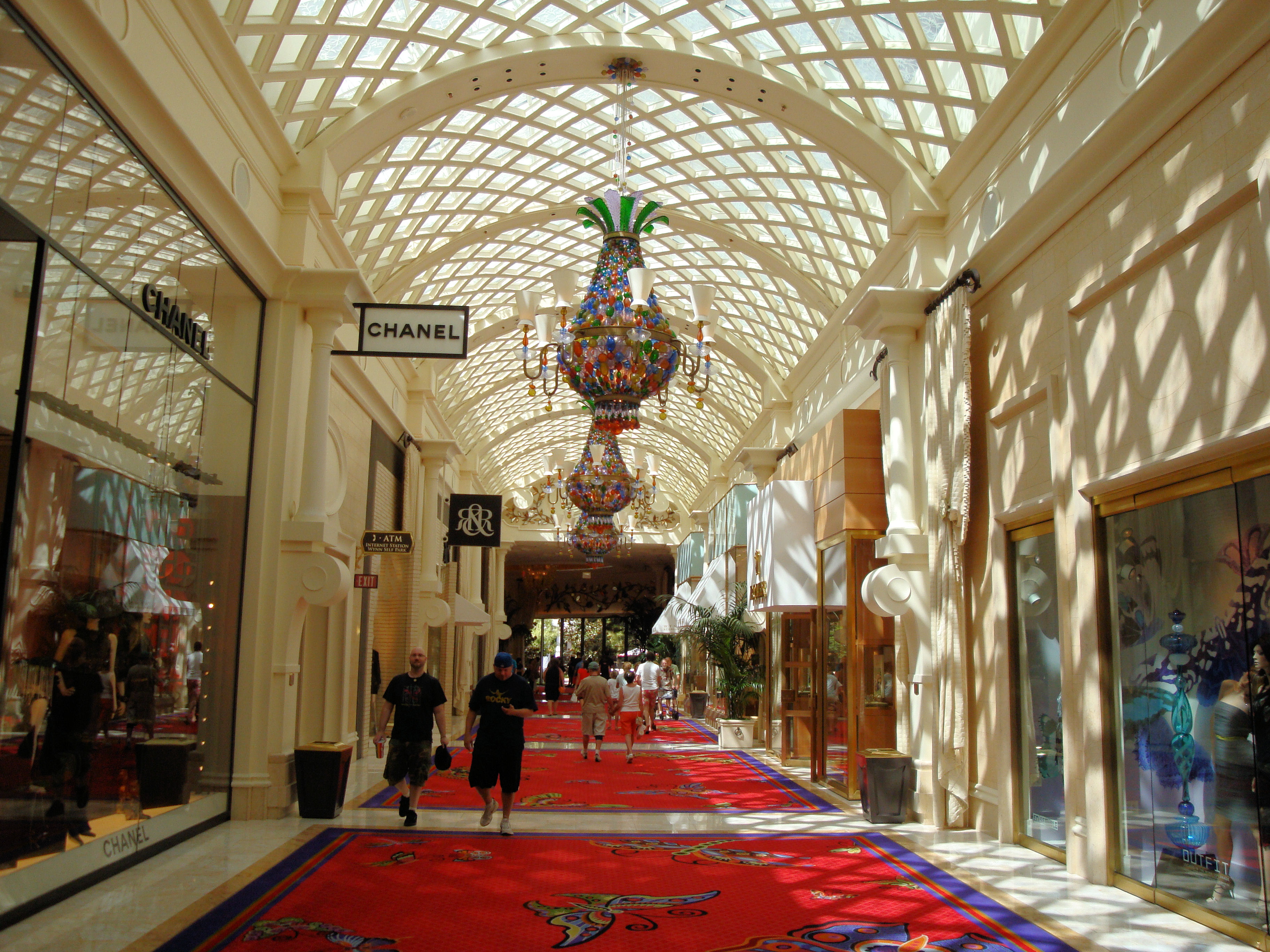
Encore Esplanade

== See also ==
- List of casinos in Nevada
- List of tallest buildings in Las Vegas
- List of largest hotels
- List of integrated resorts
