= Encore Beach Club =

Dayclub and pool complex on the Las Vegas Strip

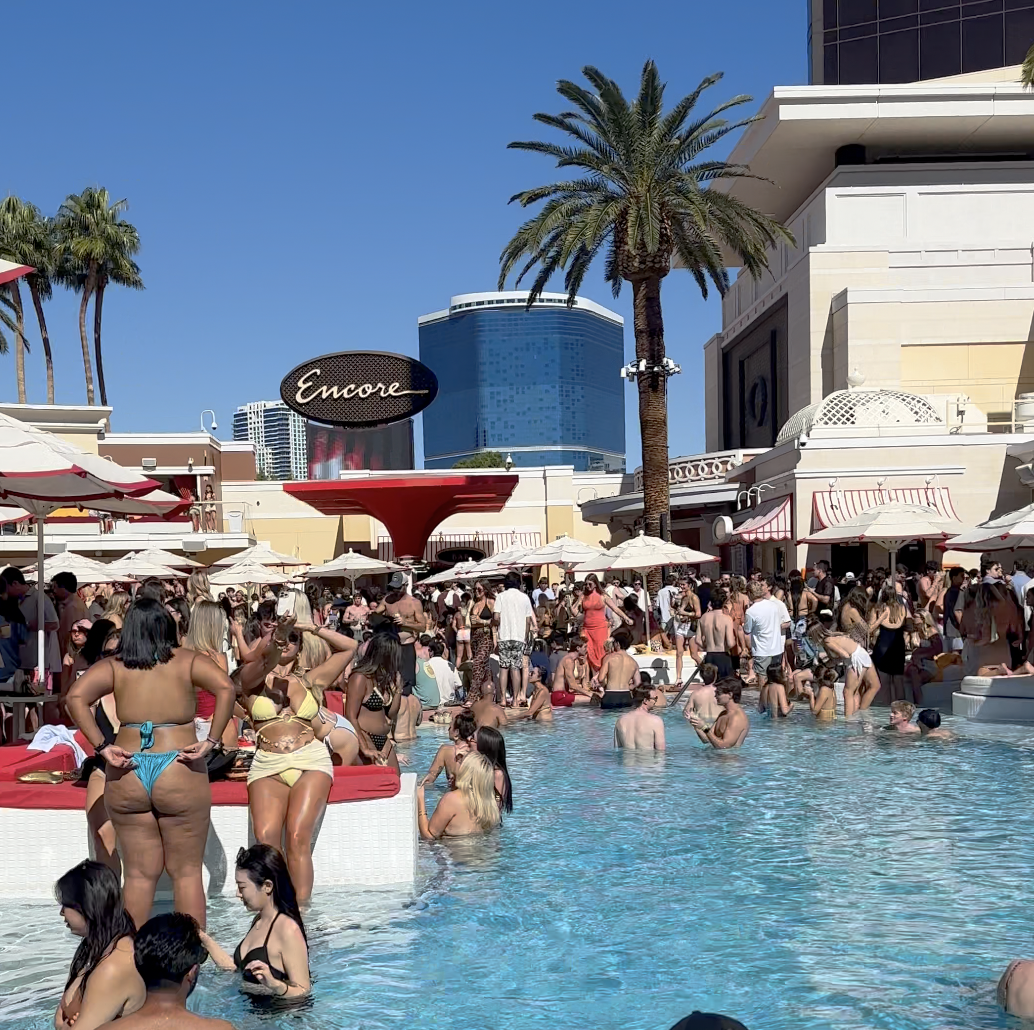
- Encore Beach Club in 2025
- Interactive map of Encore Beach Club
- Former names: Surrender Nightclub (2010-2018)
- Address: 3131 South Las Vegas Blvd; Paradise, Nevada; United States
- Coordinates: 36.1293°N 115.1661°W
- Owner: Wynn Resorts
- Type: Dayclub & Nightclub

Construction
- Opened: 2010

Website
- www.wynnlasvegas.com/nightlife/encore-beach-pool

Encore Beach Club (often shortened to EBC) is a dayclub and nightclub located at and named after the Encore Las Vegas. Opening in 2007, the dayclub, is one of two main nightlife venues at Wynn Resorts' Las Vegas complex, alongside the nightclub XS. From 2010 to 2018, Encore Beach Club also hosted the nightclub Surrender, until Surrender as a brand was retired and its events started being branded as Encore Beach Club at Night (EBC at Night).

EBC and Surrender first opened in 2010 at. The club is a major revenue generator for the Wynn, with Saturdays usually seeing the club generate over $1 million per business day.

== History ==
Encore Beach Club opened in May 2010. The indoor portion of Encore Beach Club was known as Surrender until 2018, and it spanned an adjacent 5,000 sq ft (460 m^{2}) nightclub. Both were managed by Sean Christie's Las Vegas Nightlife Group, which also operated the Blush nightclub at Wynn Las Vegas. XS and Surrender later became some of the top-grossing nightclubs in the United States.

In 2010, rapper Lil Jon signed a DJ residency at Surrender. Swedish DJ Alesso has also performed there and at Encore Beach Club. The Chainsmokers and Kygo each began ongoing residencies at XS in 2017. Other entertainers at the clubs have included Swedish House Mafia, country artist Dustin Lynch, and DJs Marshmello, Diplo, and RL Grime. In 2018, the position of artist relations was taken over by David Hadden. By that time, Encore Beach Club had taken over the Surrender space.

== Layout ==
Encore Beach Club is a 55,000 sq ft (5,100 m^{2}) outdoor pool complex featuring 26 cabanas, eight two-story, 350-square-foot bungalows, and poolside blackjack and craps. A review from Condé Nast Traveler described EBC as designed with a Southern French architectural style.

The pool also sells various options for bottle and food service, which include daybeds, lounges, private cabanas and tables. Minimum spends, though, for the biggest names can surpass $18,000 USD.

== Reception ==
According to Condé Nast Traveler, Encore Beach Club received positive reception during its review, though the magazine warned patrons would experience an "inevitable hangover".

== Incidents and violations ==
In 2018, a man was kicked out of Encore Beach Club allegedly for his swim briefs and a potential act of homophobia. The man, who is gay, expressed on social media that he believes the club removed him for "being a gay man wearing a bathing suit that was just a little too gay". According to the man, security at Encore Beach Club told him "I don’t give a shit what you wear, but we had a complaint". Encore Beach Club, which originally had a policy prohibiting swim briefs, adjusted it to allow them, though still prohibiting "indecent" swim wear.

During 2025's annual pool inspections conducted by the Southern Nevada Health District, Encore Beach Club recorded four minor violations during its annual inspection on May 30. The District recorded two underwater lights out, rust on the wet deck, loose handrails, and chips in the deck, though an engineer tightened both deck and water bolts for the loose handrails during the inspection. None of the recorded violations if left unresolved would have resulted in closures or fees.

== Notable performers ==
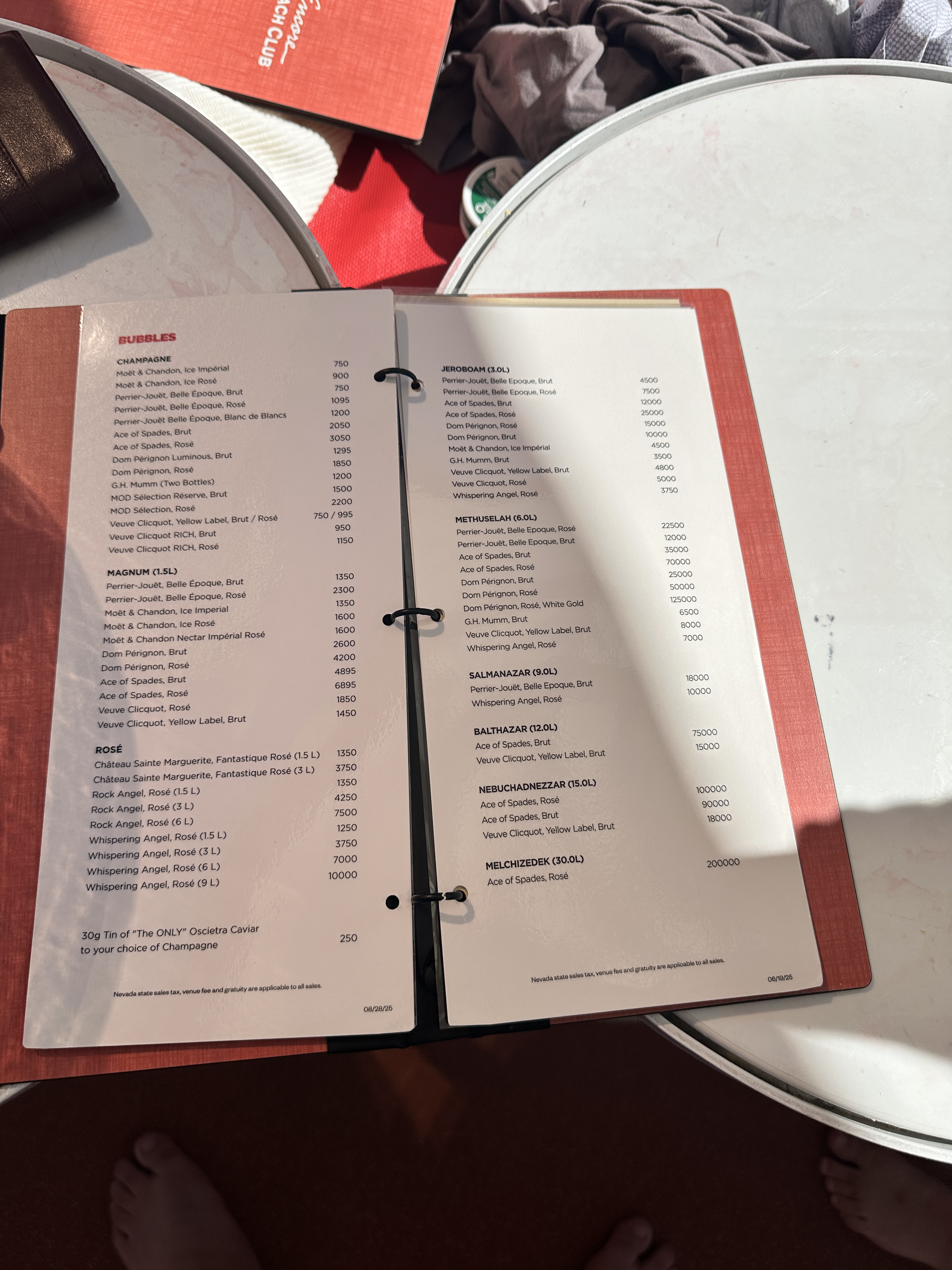
A bottle service menu at Encore Beach Club

- Alesso
- Avicii
- Diplo
- Dustin Lynch
- Kaskade
- Kygo
- Lil Jon
- LMFAO
- Marshmello
- Ne-Yo
- RL Grime
- Steve Aoki
- Sofi Tukker
- The Chainsmokers
