= Sinatra (restaurant) =

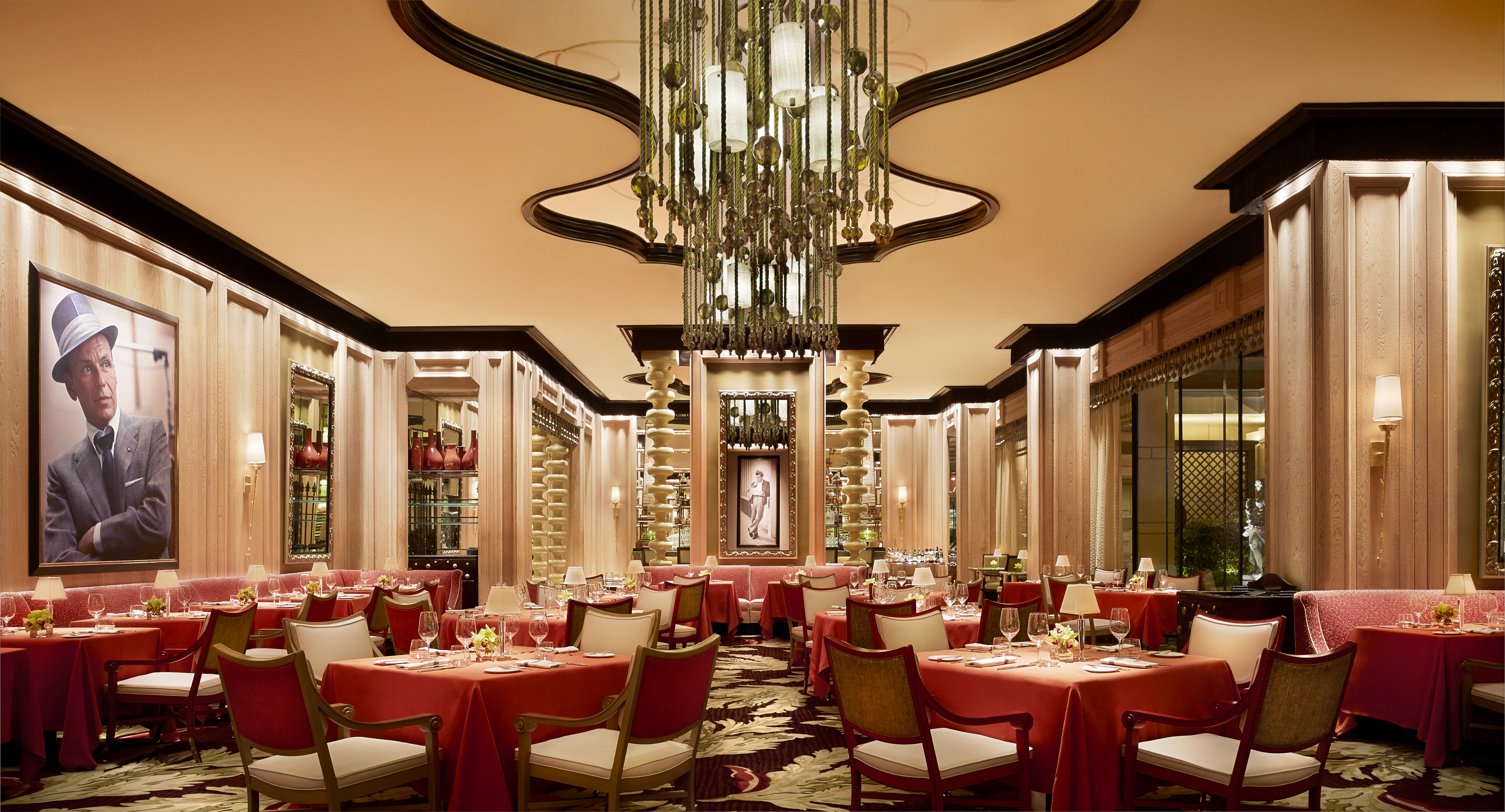
- The interior of Sinatra at Encore Las Vegas
- Interactive map of Sinatra

Restaurant information
- Established: 2008
- Location: Las Vegas, Nevada, USA
- Coordinates: 36.1299°N 115.1654°W
- Website: www.wynnlasvegas.com/dining/fine-dining/sinatra

Sinatra is a fine dining Italian restaurant within Encore Las Vegas on the Las Vegas Strip in Paradise, Nevada. It is the only restaurant sanctioned by the Sinatra Foundation and Frank Sinatra's family to use the "Sinatra" name. Michelin-starred Executive Chef Theo Schoenegger cooked for Frank Sinatra himself while at San Domenico, New York, and later as a chef for Frank's dinner parties.

== History ==
Frank Sinatra is closely associated with Las Vegas, making his debut in the 450-seat Painted Room at the Desert Inn on September 13, 1951. Over the next decades, "Ol' Blue Eyes" played thousands of nights with the Rat Pack, defining an era of entertainment on the Las Vegas Strip. Steve Wynn became personal friends with Sinatra, and brought him to perform at the Golden Nugget in the 1980s.

Wynn and Encore Las Vegas sit on the site of the Sinatra's debut at the former Desert Inn, which inspired Wynn to pay tribute to the legacy of Frank Sinatra within the new hotel. The resulting restaurant, Sinatra, opened with Encore in 2008.

Chef Theo Schoenegger opened the restaurant in 2008 and serves as executive chef today. Schoenegger cooked for Sinatra for years, noting that Sinatra's taste was for simple classic Italian dishes, prepared consistently and well.

The restaurant design features warm woods, silk chandeliers and wall-coverings, and sophisticated crystals, overlooking a private garden. Reviews call it "another one of Wynn's flawless, gorgeous dining rooms."

== Cuisine ==
Sinatra serves "updated Italian classics" including recreations of some of Frank Sinatra's favorite dishes, such as osso buco, and veal Milanese. Schoenegger notes that the menu combines dishes he prepared for the singer, as well as "my interpretation of" modernized Italian dishes and seasonal classics. According to Schoenegger, the menu "pays tribute to the musical icon we all loved."

== Reception ==
Reviews call the restaurant "an ode to the singer" and "one of the most beautiful restaurants in Las Vegas". The Forbes Travel Guide gives it four stars, calls it "a romantic alternative to the frenzied pulse of Las Vegas" and notes the "top-notch waitstaff." Gayot calls it "a new twist on Italian cooking all while paying homage to the great Frank Sinatra" and noting the availability of Italian classics as well as a vegetarian menu. Las Vegas Weekly says that it is "among the Strip's best Italian restaurants" that serves "some of the Strip’s best and most seasonally inspired Italian cuisine in another one of Wynn's flawless, gorgeous dining rooms.”"Infatuation calls the food "a swanky Italian dinner worthy of true Vegas royalty" and emphasizes the signature dessert, "a light fudgy dark chocolate mousse shaped like Sinatra's iconic fedora."

Other reviews note the availability of a private room for VIP guests and special events.
