= Suadero =

Thin cut of meat in Mexican cuisine

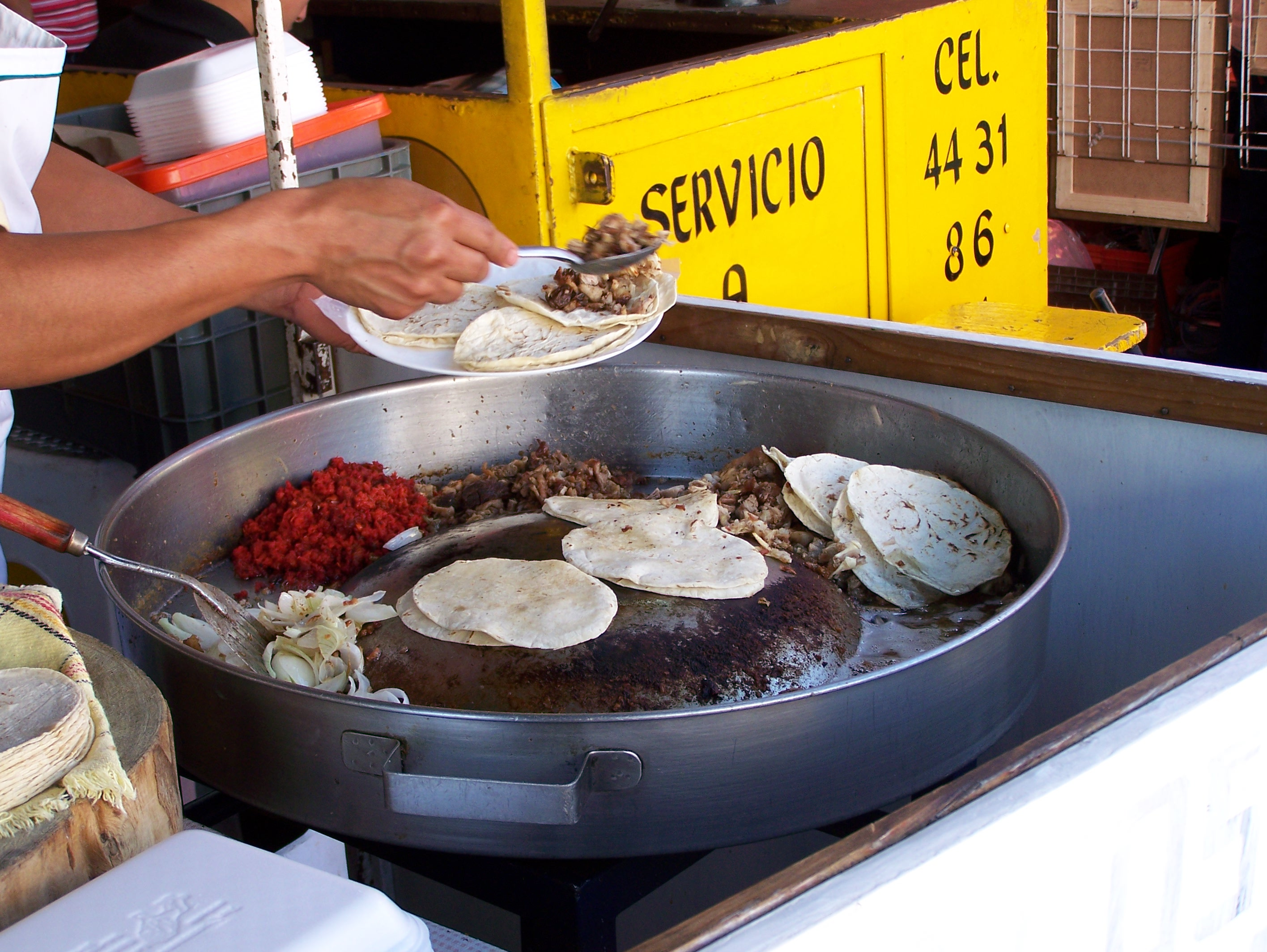
- Tacos de suadero
- Place of origin: Mexico
- Serving temperature: Hot
- Main ingredients: Beef

Suadero, in Mexican cuisine, is a thin cut of meat from the intermediate part of the cow or pig between the belly and the leg. Suadero is noted for having a smooth texture rather than a muscle grain. Typically, suadero is confited or fried and used as a taco filling.

Suadero, also known as matambre in Argentina, sobrebarriga in Colombia, and rose meat in the United States, is the name of a very thin cut of beef in Argentina, Paraguay and Uruguay, taken from between the skin and the ribs, a sort of flank steak. In Mexico City, México, it is very common and popular, offered mainly on street taco stands, but also eaten in sandwiches (tortas) and in a sort of round thick hollow fritter, made of corn dough, served hot, flat and filled with various meats, garnishes and sauces; these are called gorditas.
