= XS (nightclub) =

Indoor and outdoor nightclub on the Las Vegas Strip

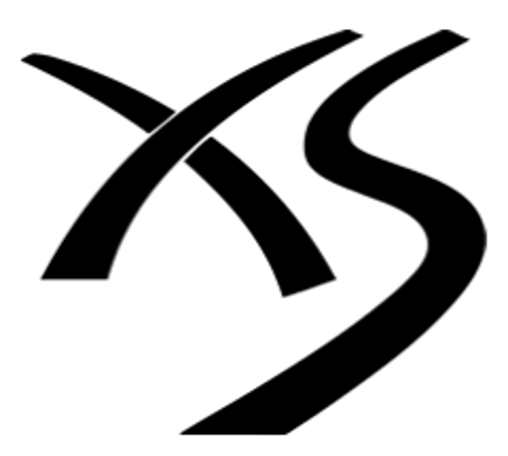

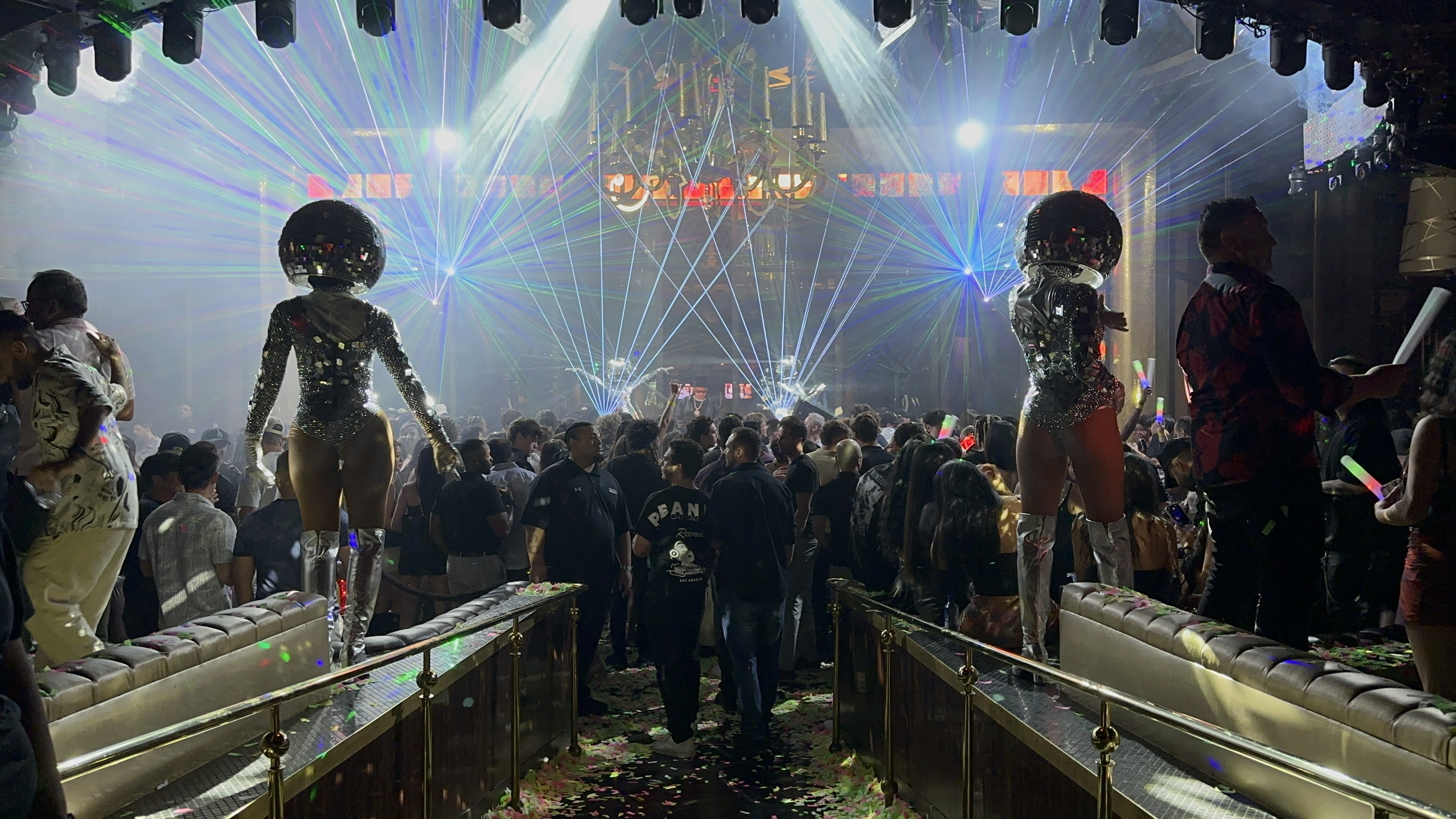
- XS in 2026
- Interactive map of XS
- Address: 3131 S Las Vegas Blvd; Paradise, NV; United States
- Coordinates: 36.127794°N 115.165229°W
- Owner: Wynn Resorts
- Type: Nightclub

Construction
- Opened: 2008

Website
- www.wynnlasvegas.com/nightlife/xs-nightclub

XS is a nightclub located on the Las Vegas Strip in Paradise, Nevada, inside of the Encore Las Vegas. Operated by the nightlife division of Wynn Resorts, XS was the highest grossing nightclub in the United States for several years between the late 2000s and early 2010s.

== History ==
XS first opened on New Year's Eve 2008 as a partnership between Wynn Resorts and Victor Drai, who himself is known for his eponymous nightclub and after hours hip hop lounge.

In 2009, Wynn faced a trademark infringement claim from NYLO hotels, which operated two hotels at the time in Texas and Rhode Island. NYLO's hotels were not named XS yet but rather XP; nevertheless NYLO claimed that it had intended to name one of its next hotels XS, and had offered Wynn a licensing agreement. Wynn responded that naming a nightclub XS did not infringe on NYLO's trademarks.

Local newspapers rumored that XS was the most expensive nightclub in the United States to construct, at an estimated cost of $100 million.

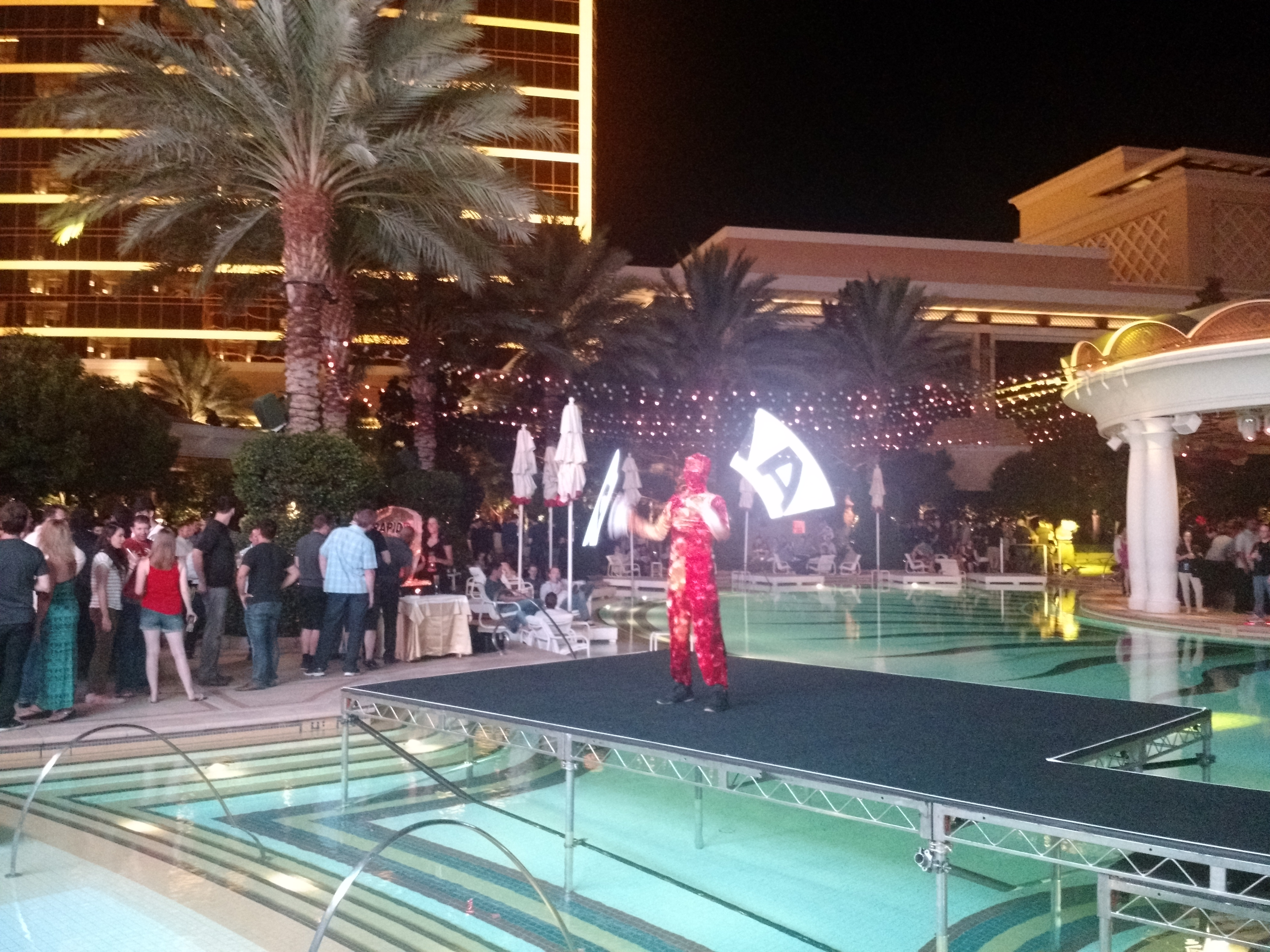
The outdoor portion of XS

In 2014, XS set its attendance record at 11,500, up from an Avicii set that saw 10,000, with Zedd headlining the record breaking night for his 25th birthday set. That same year, XS underwent its first notable renovation, installing a new $5 million lighting system, and the following year, XS installed additions that included a pyrotechnic system, a DJ booth surrounded by 14,000 LED units, multiple video screens including some movable displays, lasers, marquee lights, and an additional 3D cubic video screen. According to Eater, XS made all of these upgrades without closing the club down.

XS also introduced occasional country music nights in 2024, with a December show titled "Desert Saddle" hosting Kane Brown, Diplo (under the name Thomas Wesley), Dustin Lynch, Vavo, Brandi Cyrus, and regular XS resident Marshmello.

In 2025, XS announced that in September 2026, the club will undergo extensive renovations for approximately four months, expected in time for New Year's Eve.

== Layout ==
XS spans 40,000 square feet (3,700 m^{2}) as a hybrid indoor and outdoor area, taking up some poolspace at the Encore. The dance floor is flanked by golden body sculptures and features an LED chandelier immediately above it.

The outdoor portion of XS is occasionally used to host Sunday late night pool parties where only the outdoor section is open. XS' "Night Swim" events are the longest running pool parties in Las Vegas.

== Reception and reviews ==
Reviews of XS are generally positive. Condé Nast Traveler's Andrea Bennett reviewed XS as being "all about opulence", emphasizing golden-colored details and the pyrotechnics. CNN listed XS as its preferred nightclub in a list of cities for nightlife, though noted the line could often be over two hours long.

Jane Ann Morrison of the Las Vegas Review-Journal highlighted safety concerns for XS, though, alongside the rest of Las Vegas' nightclubs in a 2013 piece. According to a testimony to Morrison from a caller, the patron's wallet of $1400 cash and iPhone were stolen when a man at XS introduced him to two women, and the patron did not recall leaving XS by memory. The patron returned to XS the next night, though, and Morrison used the article to warn men about the potential dangers of attending Vegas nightclubs.

== Notable performers ==
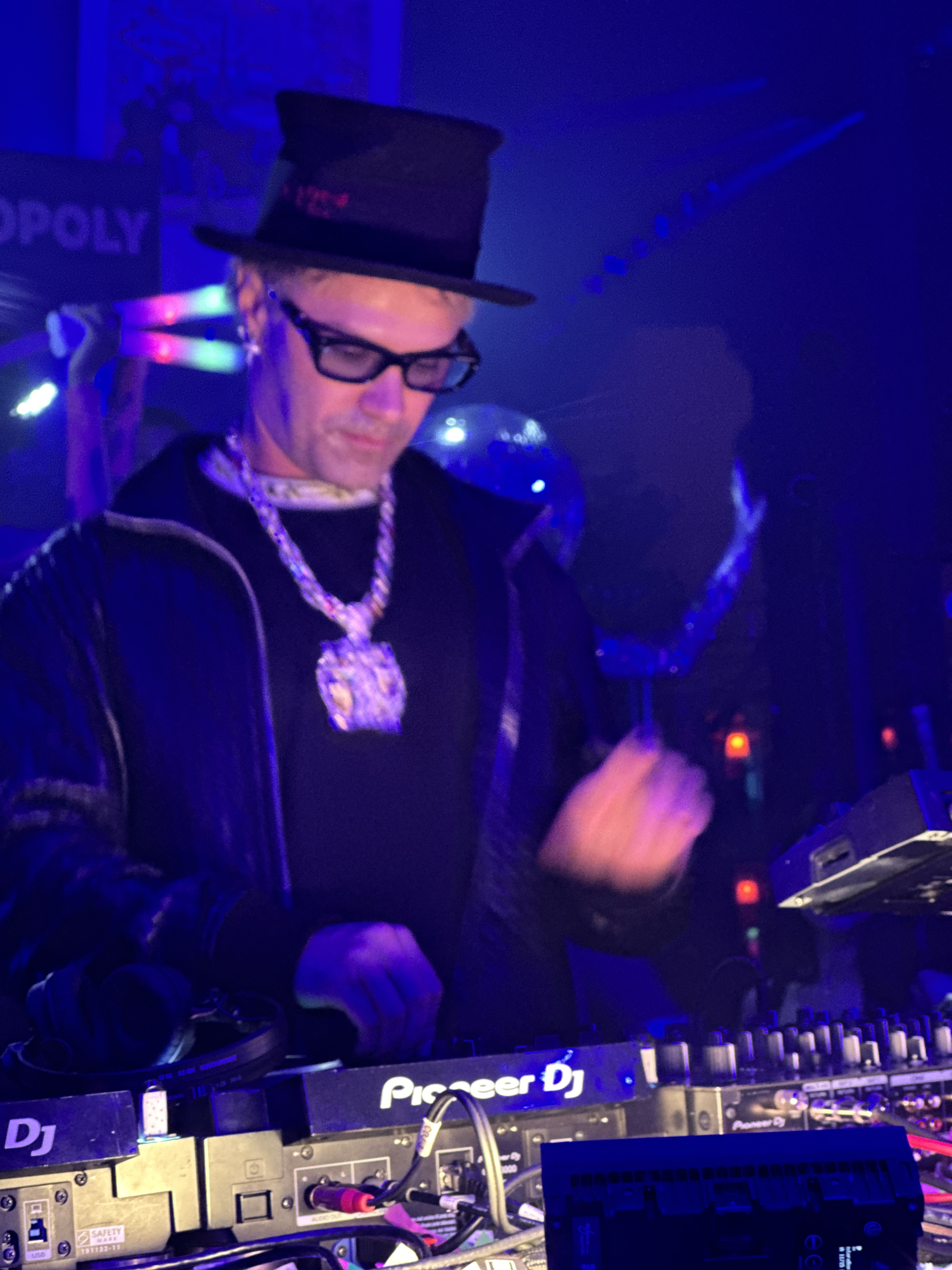
Alec Monopoly performing at XS in 2026

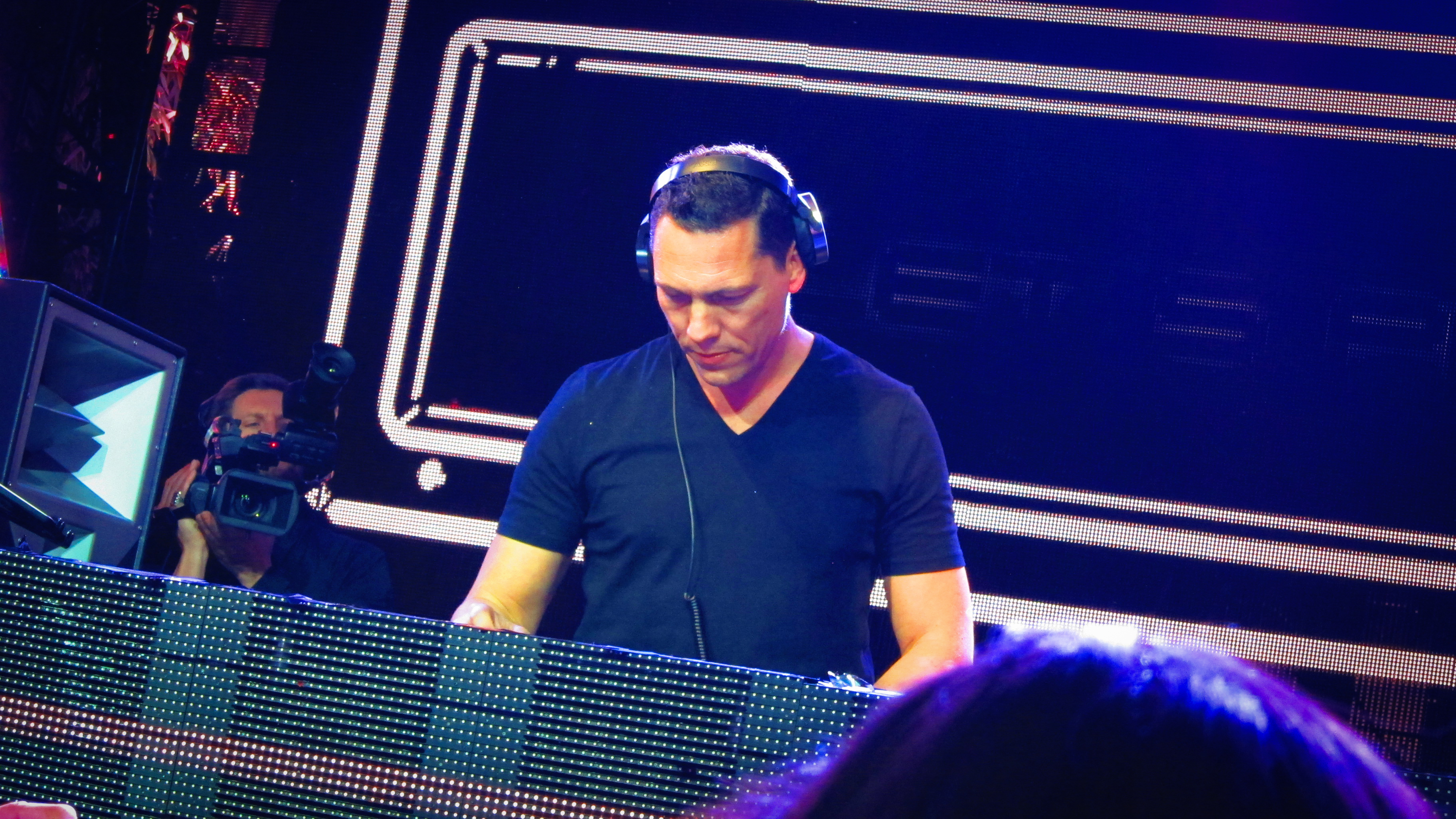
Tiësto playing a set at XS

- Alec Monopoly
- Alesso
- Avicii
- Brandi Cyrus
- BUNT.
- Calvin Harris
- David Guetta
- Deadmau5
- Dillon Francis
- Diplo
- Drake
- Dustin Lynch
- Gryffin
- Hunter Siegel
- Hugel
- Justin Bieber
- Kaskade
- Kygo
- Loud Luxury
- Marshmello
- Mau P
- Odd Mob
- Odesza
- Skrillex
- Sofi Tukker
- Subtronics
- Sullivan King
- The Chainsmokers
- Tiësto
- Valentino Khan
- Virgil Abloh
- Zedd
