= Readinger =

Readinger is a surname. Notable people with the surname include:

- Alexis Readinger (born 1975), American hospitality designer
- David Readinger (born 1935), American politician
