= Caesars Palace =

Integrated resort in Paradise, Nevada, US

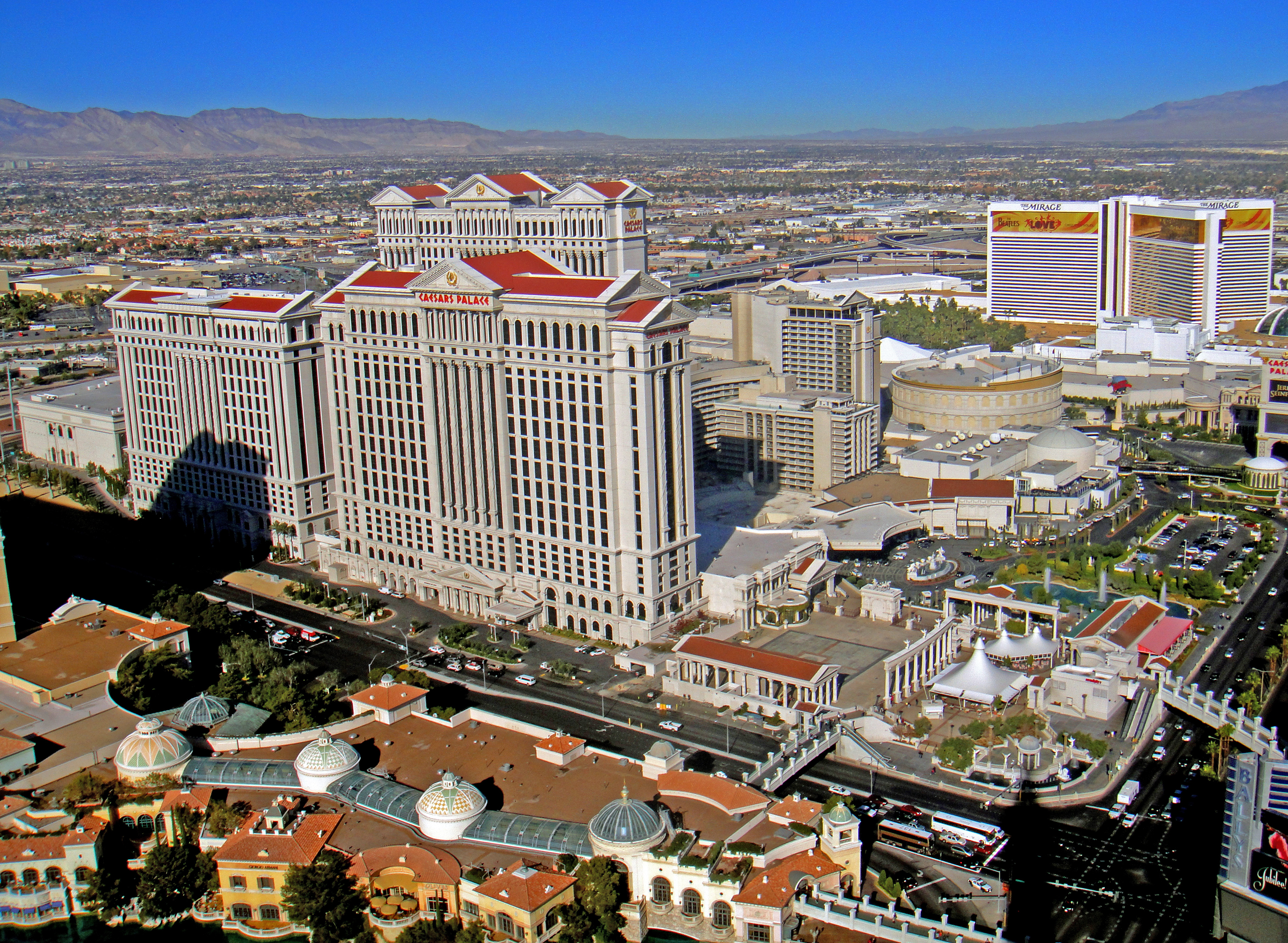

- Location within Las Vegas Strip Location within Nevada
- Interactive map of Caesars Palace
- Location: Paradise, Nevada, U.S.; 3570 South Las Vegas Boulevard; 36°07′04″N 115°10′30″W
- Opened: August 5, 1966; 60 years ago
- Theme: Roman Empire
- No. of rooms: 3,960
- Gaming space: 124,181 sq ft (11,536.8 m^{2})
- Permanent shows: Absinthe
- Signature attractions: Replica ancient Roman, Greek and Renaissance art The Colosseum at Caesars Palace; The Forum Shops at Caesars
- Notable restaurants: Bacchanal Buffet; Gordon Ramsay Hell's Kitchen; Peter Luger Steak House; Restaurant Guy Savoy
- Owner: Vici Properties
- Operating license holder: Caesars Entertainment
- Architect: Melvin Grossman (1966)
- Renovated in: 1970, 1974, 1979, 1992, 1997, 2001, 2005, 2011, 2015–17, 2021–22
- Website: caesarspalace.com

Caesars Palace is a luxury casino hotel in Paradise, Nevada, United States. The hotel is situated on the west side of the Las Vegas Strip between Bellagio and the under-construction Hard Rock Las Vegas. It is one of Las Vegas's largest and best known landmarks.

Caesars Palace opened in 1966 by Jay Sarno and Stanley Mallin, with billionaire Kirk Kerkorian as the landlord. They sought to create an opulent facility that gave guests a sense of life during the Roman Empire. It contains many statues, columns, and iconography typical of Hollywood Roman period productions including a 20-foot (6.1 m) statue of Augustus Caesar near the entrance. Caesars Palace is now owned by Vici Properties and operated by Caesars Entertainment. As of July 2016, the hotel has 3,960 rooms and suites in six towers and a convention facility of over 300,000 square feet (28,000 m^{2}).

The hotel has a large array of restaurants. From the outset, Caesars Palace has been oriented towards attracting high rollers. The modern casino facilities include table games such as blackjack, craps, roulette, baccarat, Spanish 21, mini-baccarat, Pai Gow and Pai Gow poker. The casino also features a 4,500-square-foot (420 m^{2}) 24-hour poker room; as well as many slot machines and video poker machines. The hotel has operated as a host venue for live music and sports entertainment. In addition to holding boxing matches since the late 1970s, Caesars also hosted the Caesars Palace Grand Prix from 1981 to 1982.

Notable entertainers who have performed at Caesars Palace include Frank Sinatra, Reba McEntire, Brooks & Dunn, Sammy Davis Jr., Teresa Teng, Dean Martin, Rod Stewart, Stevie Nicks, The Moody Blues, Celine Dion, Ike & Tina Turner, Shania Twain, Patti Page, Bette Midler, Cher, Elton John, Liberace, Diana Ross, Liza Minnelli, Julio Iglesias, Tony Bennett, Harry Belafonte, Julie Andrews, Judy Garland, Gloria Estefan, Janet Jackson, Mariah Carey, Sting, Matt Goss, Adele, and Deana Martin.

The main performance venue is The Colosseum. The theater seats 4,296 people and contains a 22,450-square-foot (2,086 m^{2}) stage. The stage was a special construction for Celine Dion's show, "A New Day...", in 2003. After departing in 2007, Dion returned to the Colosseum with her new show entitled "Celine" on March 15, 2011, which was under contract through June 9, 2018 for 65 shows per year.

== History ==
=== 20th century ===
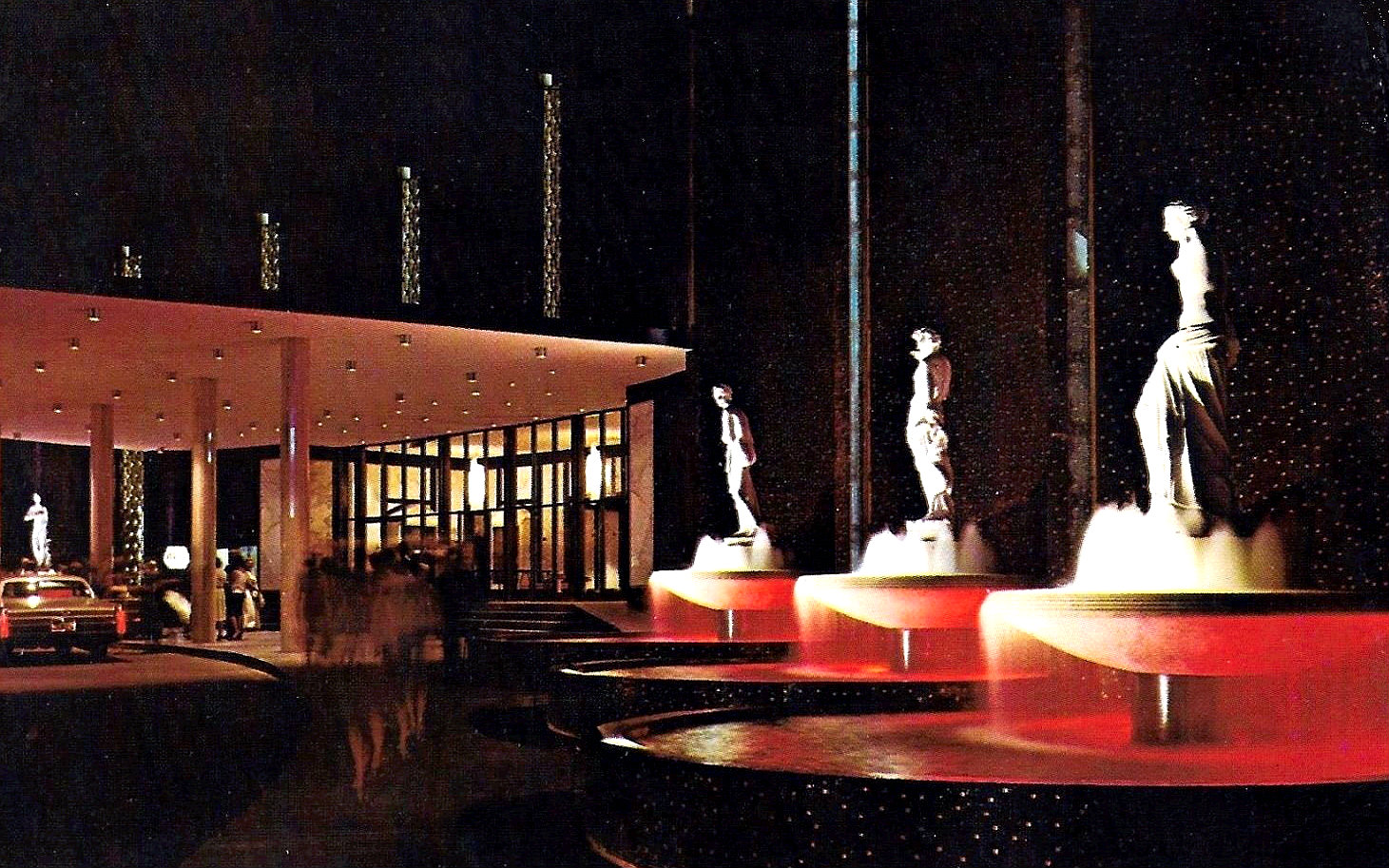
Caesars Palace fountains in 1970

In 1962, cabana motel owners Jay Sarno and Stanley Mallin received a $10.6 million loan from the Teamsters Central States Pension Fund. They began plans to build a hotel on land owned by billionaire Kirk Kerkorian. Sarno would later act as designer of the hotel he planned to construct. His vision was to emulate life under the Roman Empire. The objective of the palace was to ensure an atmosphere in which everybody staying at the hotel would feel like a Caesar; this is why the name "Caesars Palace" lacks an apostrophe, making "Caesars" a plural instead of possessive noun.

Caesars Palace was instrumental in beginning a new era of lavish casinos from the late 1960s onward. The original hotel was designed by architect Melvin Grossman (1914–2003), who had worked primarily in Miami. The design of Caesars borrowed heavily from his earlier Cabaña Hotel (1962) in Palo Alto. Architectural writer, Alan Hess, stated: "Caesars Palace needed only a sumptuous array of Classical statuary and a host of marble-white columns to establish its theme. The visitor's imagination, in league with well-placed publicity, filled in the opulence". Jefferson Graham wrote that the result was "the gaudiest, weirdest, most elaborate, and most talked about resort Vegas had ever seen. [Its] emblem was a chesty female dipping grapes into the waiting mouth of a recumbent Roman, fitted out in toga, laurel wreath, and phallic dagger".

The inauguration ceremony was held on August 5, 1966. Sarno and his partner, Nate Jacobsen, spent one million dollars on the event. The cost included "the largest order of Ukrainian caviar ever placed by a private organization", two tons of filet mignon, 300 pounds (140 kg) of Maryland crabmeat and 50,000 glasses of champagne.

Cocktail waitresses in Greco-Roman wigs would greet guests and say "Welcome to Caesars Palace, I am your slave". Among the performers at the opening were Andy Williams and Phil Richards. According to author Ovid Demaris, Caesars Palace was "a mob-controlled casino from the day it opened its doors". By the time it opened, the significant publicity of the new hotel had generated $42 million in advanced bookings.

On December 31, 1967, stunt performer Evel Knievel arrived at the hotel to watch a boxing match and convinced Sarno that he could jump over the distance of 140 feet (43 m) over the fountains. ABC came in to film the jump, in which Knievel hit the top of the safety ramp after the jump and flew over his handlebars into the parking lot of neighboring Dunes. fracturing his pelvis, several bones, and suffering a concussion. He lay in a hospital unconscious for 29 days before recovering. On April 14, 1989, Knievel's son Robbie successfully completed the jump.

The first casino at the hotel was named Circus Circus. It was intended to be the world's liveliest and most expensive casino, attracting elite gamblers from around the world. In 1969, a Federal Organized Crime Task Force accused the casino's financial manager, Jerome Zarowitz, of having ties with organized-crime figures in New York and New England. Although Zarowitz was never tried, the task force pressured Sarno and his other investors to sell the casino, which led to it being acquired by Lum's restaurant chain owners Stuart and Clifford S. Perlman for $60 million. The company soon shed its restaurant operations and changed its name to Caesars World. On July 15 of that year, executives lay ground on an expansion area of the hotel, and they buried a time capsule in the area.

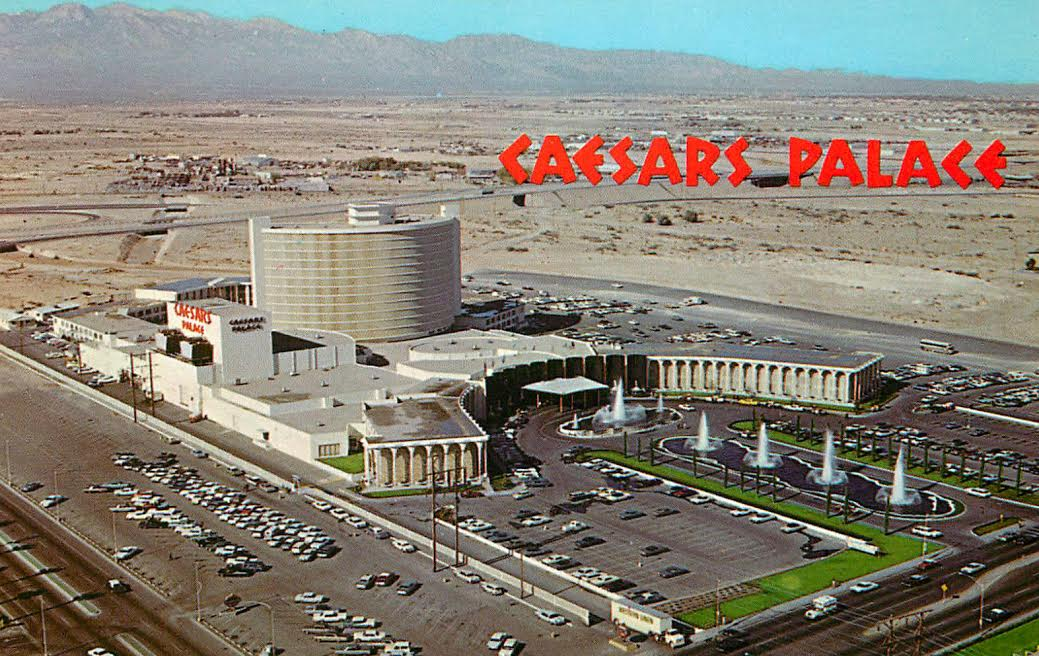
Caesars Palace in 1970

Frank Sinatra began performing at Caesars Palace in 1967, after a fallout with Howard Hughes and Carl Cohen at The Sands. He signed a three-year contract. In the early morning hours of September 6, 1970, Sinatra was playing high stakes baccarat at the casino, where he was performing at the time. Normal limits for the game are US$2,000 per hand; Sinatra had been playing for US$8,000 and wanted the stakes to be raised to US$16,000.

When Sinatra began shouting after his request was denied, hotel executive Sanford Waterman came to talk with him. Witnesses to the incident said the two men both made threats, with Waterman producing a gun and pointing it at Sinatra. Sinatra walked out of the casino and returned to his Palm Springs home without fulfilling the rest of his three-week engagement there.

Waterman was booked on a charge of assault with a deadly weapon, but was released without bail. The local district attorney's office declined to file charges against Waterman for pulling the gun, stating that Sinatra had refused to make a statement regarding the incident. Despite swearing to never perform at Caesars again, Sinatra returned after his retirement in January 1974, and became a frequent performer at Caesars Palace throughout the decade. He was performing at Caesars when his mother Dolly died in a plane crash in January 1977, and in 1979 he was awarded the Grammy Trustees Award in a party at the hotel, while celebrating 40 years in show business and his 64th birthday. When Sinatra was given back his gaming license by the Nevada Gaming Commission in 1981, he became an entertainment-public relations consultant at the casino for $20,000 a week.

In 1971, some 1,500 black American rights activists stormed the hotel in a protest. The National Welfare Rights Organization was involved with a "coalition of welfare mothers, Legal Services lawyers, radical priests and nuns, civil rights leaders, movie stars and housewives". Five years later in the spring of 1976, hundreds of black American workers went on strike at the hotel in the first major strike in Las Vegas history. The entrances to the hotel and casino were blocked, and the hotel lost several million dollars from the strike, including one cancellation worth $500,000. In 1973, the Del Webb corporation was contracted to build a $8 million 16-story building adjacent to the Palace.

In 1979, a section of two and three-story hotel buildings were demolished, making room for an Omnimax theater (1979–2000), accommodated in a purpose-built geodesic dome at what is currently the site of the Colosseum Theater. A people mover was also constructed in 1979.

In 1981, a fire broke out at the hotel, hospitalizing 16 people. The Perlmans sold their shares in Caesars World that year after trying to get a gaming license for a casino in Atlantic City, New Jersey. The New Jersey Casino Control Commission accused the brothers of doing business with people who had organized-crime connections.

In the 1990s, the hotel's management sought to create more elaborate features to compete with the other modern Las Vegas developments. The Forum Shops at Caesars opened in 1992; it was one of the first venues in the city where shopping, particularly at high-end fashion house stores, was an attraction in itself.

=== 21st century ===
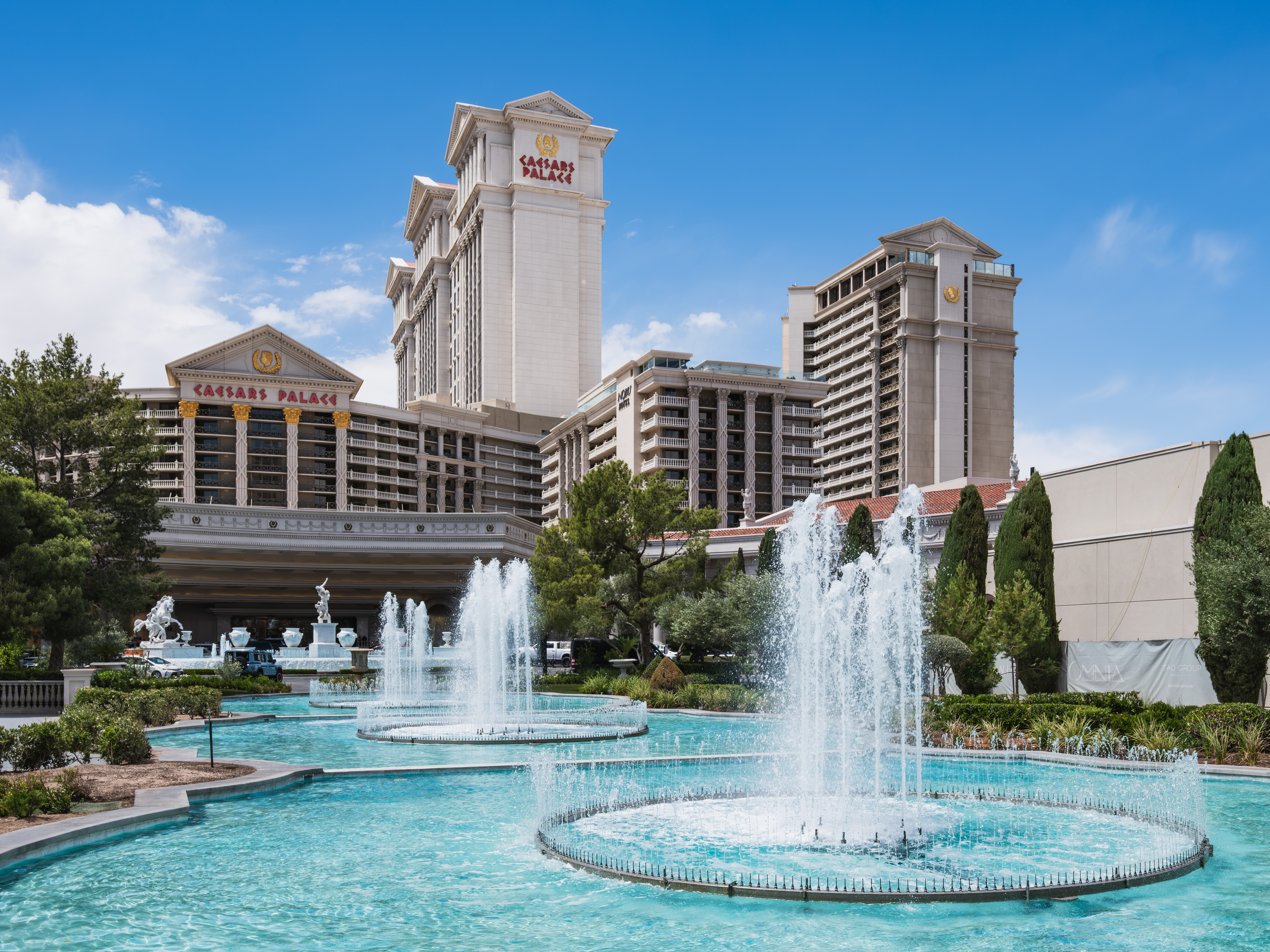
The front of Caesars Palace in 2026

An expansion of the Forum Shops opened on October 22, 2004.

In June 2005, Harrah's Entertainment acquired Caesars Entertainment, Inc. and became the owner of Caesars Palace. Harrah's changed its own name to Caesars Entertainment in 2010, to capitalize on the prestige of the Caesars brand.

In 2010, Caesars Palace was fined $250,000 by the Nevada Gaming Commission for permitting a high-limit baccarat player to dance on the card table while the game was underway. In September 2015, Caesars Palace agreed to pay the Financial Crimes Enforcement Network an $8 million civil money penalty for violating the Bank Secrecy Act.

In October 2017, ownership of Caesars Palace was transferred to Vici Properties as part of a corporate spin-off; Vici leased the property back to Caesars Entertainment at an initial annual rent of $165 million.

During the COVID-19 pandemic the casino closed on March 17, 2020. A few months later, on June 4, the casino reopened. Certain aspects of the casino remained closed afterward, such as the boutique hotel and restaurant buffet. The Nobu Hotel reopened in July, a month after the casino had reopened. The Bacchanal Buffet reopened the following year, on May 20, 2021, after a $2.4 million renovation. The shows similarly resumed, with many celebrities announcing 2023 Caesars Palace residencies; including Adele, Jerry Seinfeld, Sting, and Rod Stewart.

Caesars Palace was fined $7.8 million by the Nevada Gaming Control Board in November 2025 for failing to verify bookmaker and gambler Mathew Bowyer's funding source between 2017 and 2024, despite suspicions, which included being anonymously informed that Bowyer was a bookie. Two other casinos were also fined.

On May 28, 2026, it was announced that Fertitta Entertainment Inc will acquire Caesers Entertainment Inc in an all cash deal valued at $17.6 billion.

== Architecture ==
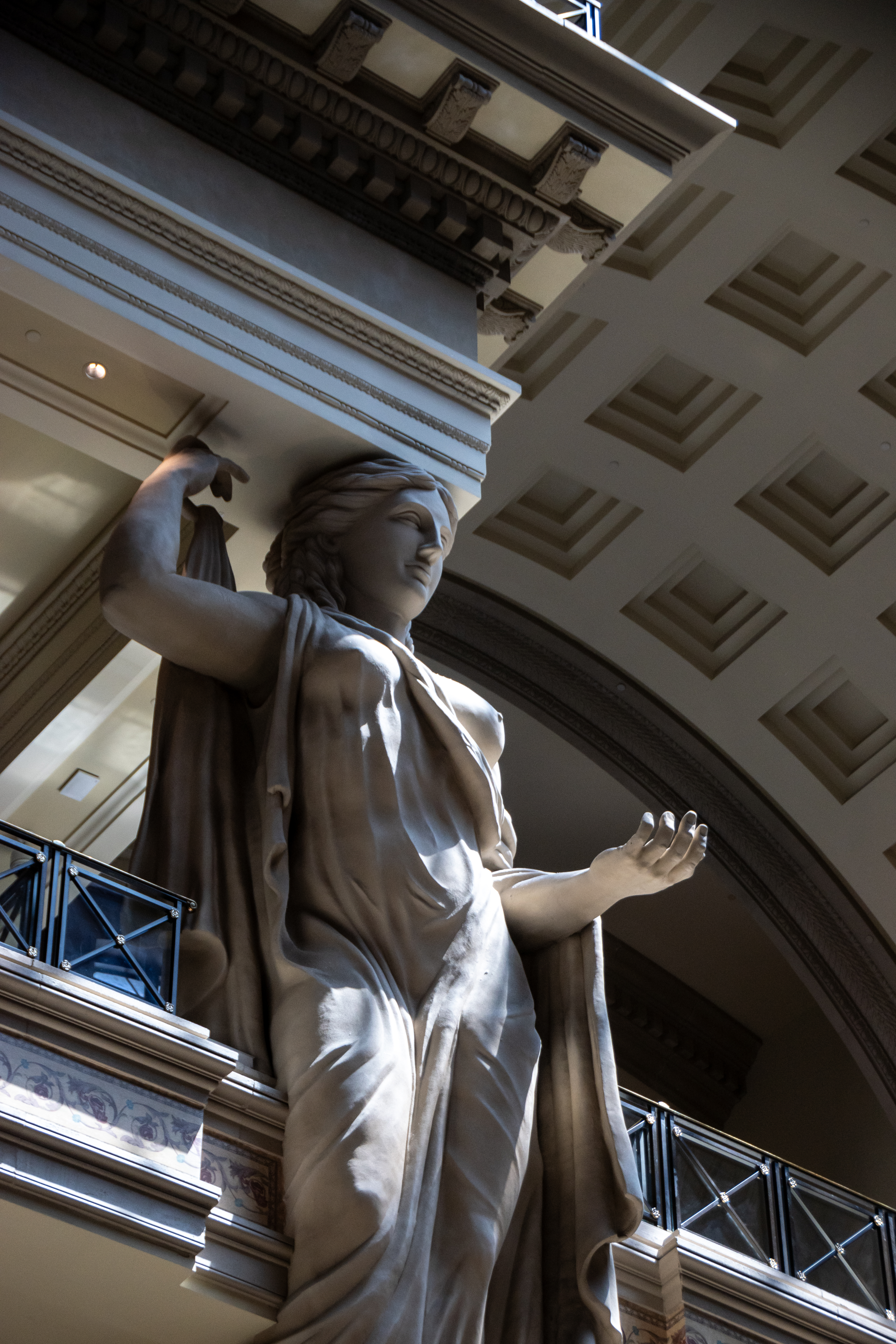
A caryatid inside the Forum Shops

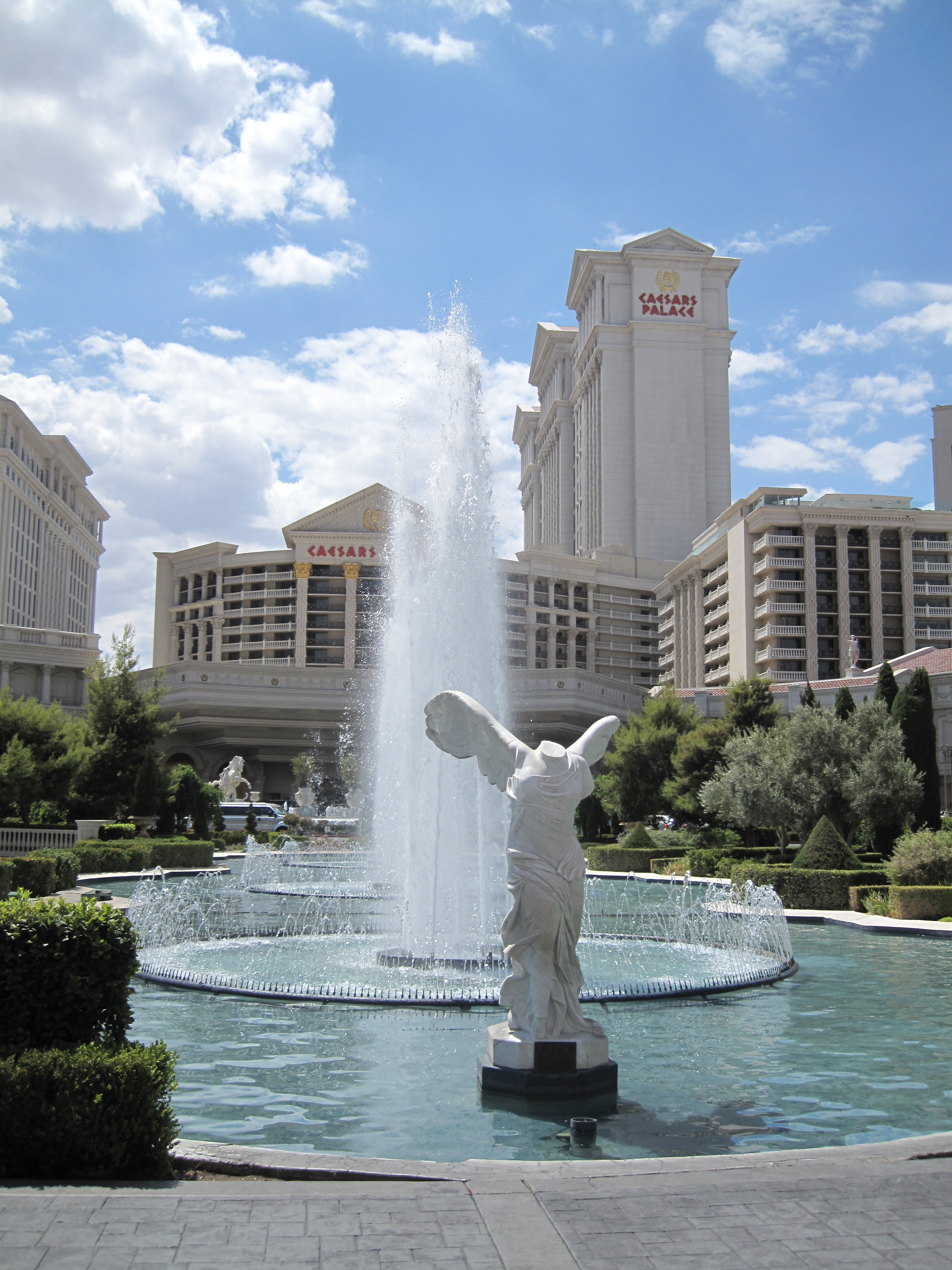
The Winged Victory of Samothrace copy in the Caesars fountain with the hotel's original structure in the background

Jeff Campbell of Lonely Planet refers to the hotel as "quintessentially Las Vegas", a "Greco-Roman fantasyland featuring marble reproductions of classical statuary". The art deco style fused with clear influences from Hollywood epic productions dominate. Construction of the 14-story Caesars Palace hotel on the 34-acre (14 ha) site began in 1965, and it opened in 1966. It lay next to Dunes Hotel and opposite the Desert Inn. The original hotel featured lanes of cypresses and marble columns as part of a 900 feet (270 m) frontage, with the hotel set back 475 feet (145 m) . The car park could accommodate up to 1300 cars.

Water is heavily used for at least 18 fountains: the casino resort uses over 240 million gallons a year. A 20 feet (6.1 m) high statue of Julius Caesar hailing a taxi lies in the driveway leading to the entrance, and there are replicas of Rape of the Sabine Women and statues of Venus and David which greet guests as they arrive. Near the entrance is a four-faced, eight-handed Brahma shrine which weighs four tons. It was made in Bangkok, Thailand, with a casting ceremony on November 25, 1983, according to the inscription on it. A multimillion-dollar renovation of the main entrance began in July 2021, and was finished seven months later. It includes a domed ceiling and a 15-foot statue of Augustus.

=== Exterior ===
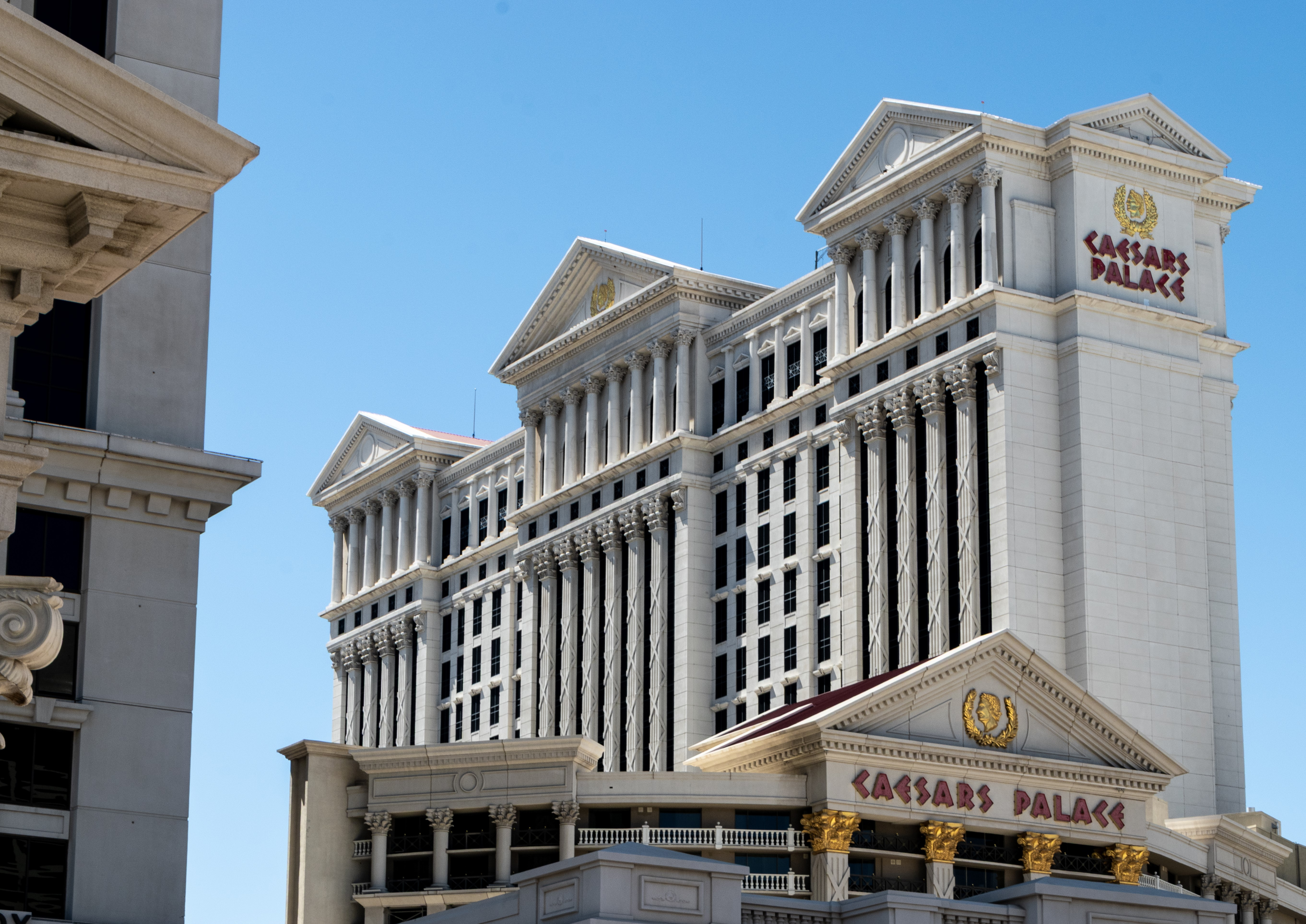
View of the Palace Tower from near the Spiegeltent in 2025

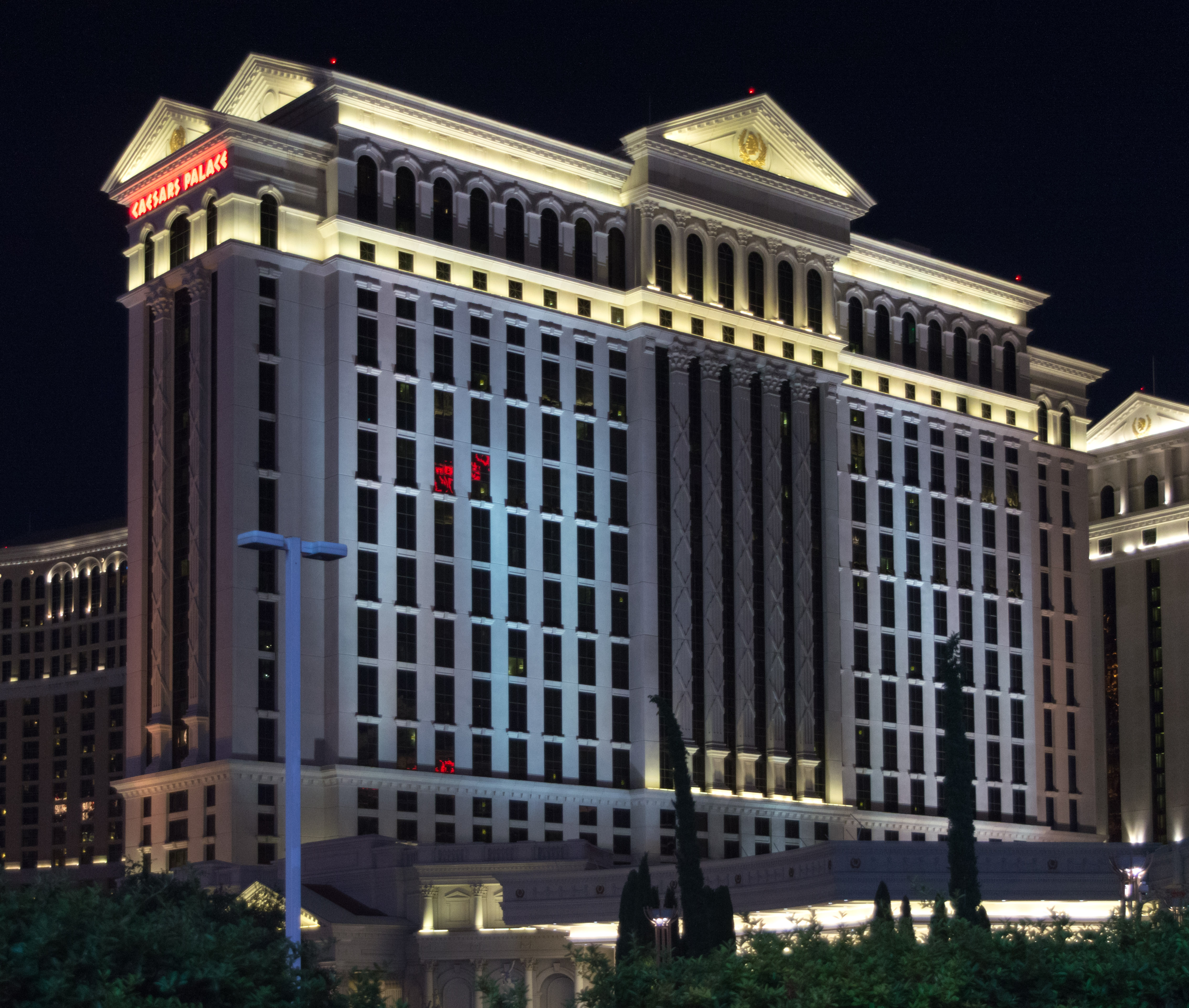
Augustus Tower in 2015

A $75 million renovation of the hotel's original Roman Tower, built in 1966 and extended in 1974, was completed in January 2016. The 14-story Tower, last renovated in 2001, will have 20 rooms added for a total of 587 rooms and suites, and will be renamed the Julius Tower. Entertainment Close-Up wrote that the Julius Tower is the "latest piece of a $1 billion investment to cement Caesars Palace as the premier resort at the center of the Las Vegas Strip". Nobu Tower (formerly Centurion Tower) is a 14-story tower that was completed in 1970 at a cost of $4.2 million. In 2011 it was announced that the tower would be renovated and be renamed to Nobu, and to operate as the first Nobu Hotel with a restaurant. A remodeling of the Nobu Hotel took place during 2021.

Rooms in the Forum Tower opened in 1979. The Palace Tower opened in 1997 and mirrors the Greco-Roman theme of the hotel with fluted columns and Corinthian columns and pediments on its facade and fountains and statues scattered around its interior space.

Plans for the Augustus Tower began in 2003 and were consolidated in 2004 with the architects Bergman Walls Associates. The expansion at a cost of $289 million US included a 26-story, 345-foot-tall tower, as well as an addition of new convention and meeting facilities at the resort. The Augustus opened in 2005 with 949 rooms, which were designed for more upscale luxury and service than the other parts of the resort. The Octavius Tower opened in January 2012. The 668-room tower was added as part of a $860-million expansion. The tower shares a lobby with the Augustus Tower. The pools at Caesars Palace are modeled after the Roman baths.

=== The Forum Shops at Caesars ===
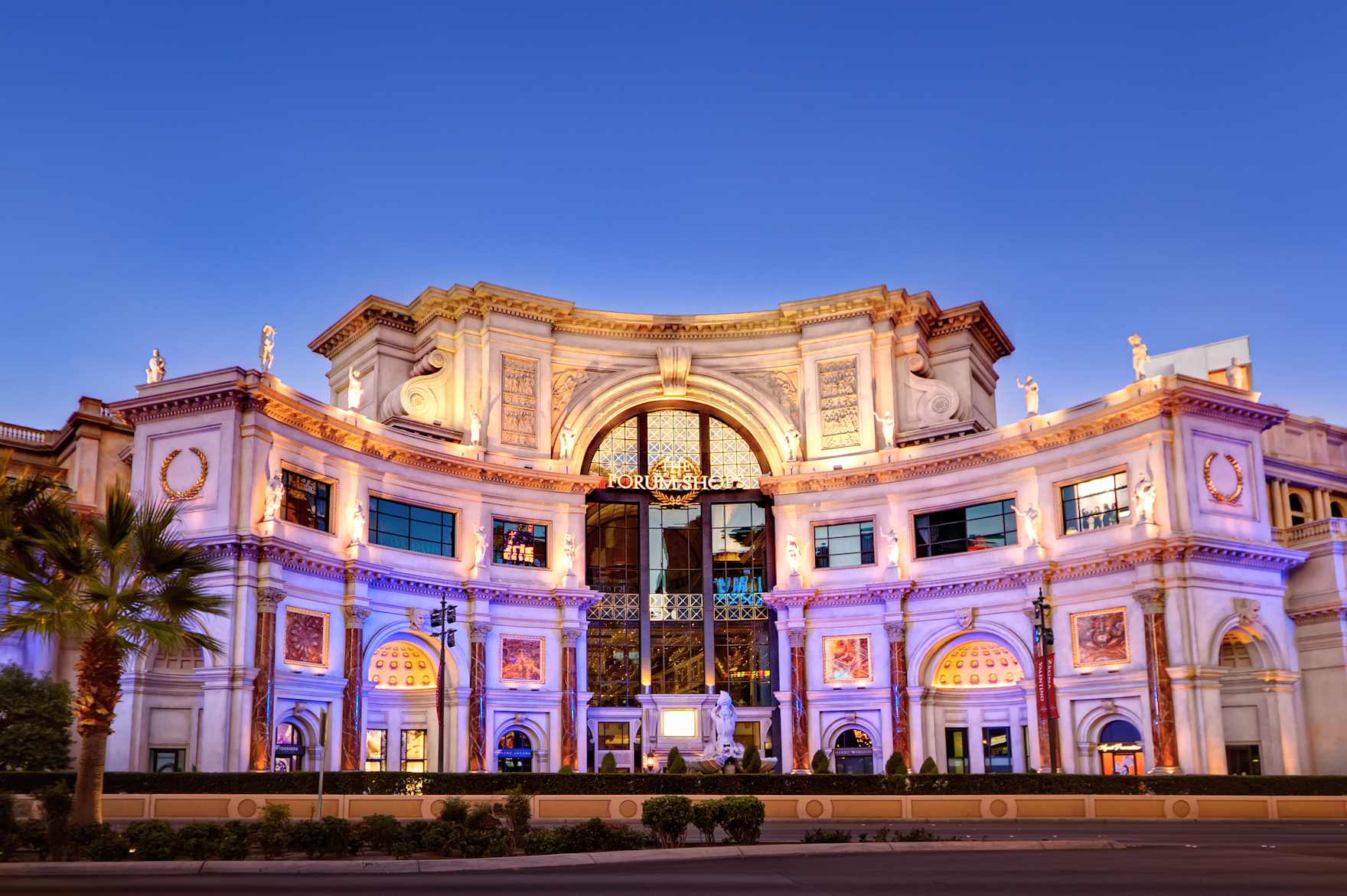
The Forum Shops in 2011

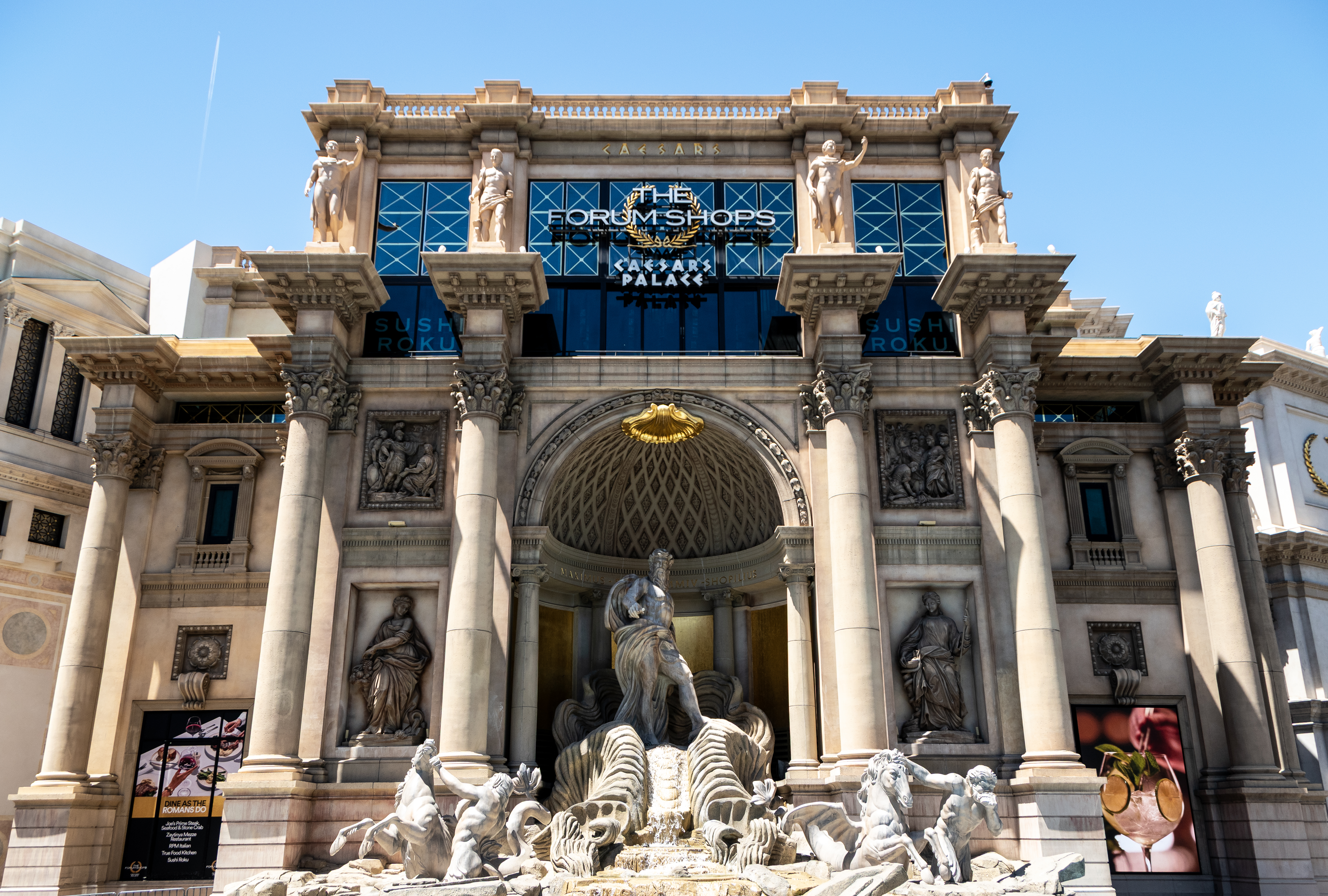
The Trevi Fountain Replica at the Forum Shops in 2025

The Forum Shops at Caesars, also known as "The Forum", is a 636,000-square-foot (59,100 m^{2}) shopping mall, built as an extension wing of the main hotel and casino in 1992.

The mall's spiral staircase consists of spiral escalators. The mall also contains many replicas of famous fountains. The Fall of Atlantis fountain uses special effects and 9 feet (2.7 m) animated figures to tell the story of the Myth of Atlantis.

With many high-end boutiques including Cartier, Chanel, Calvin Klein, Dior, Emporio Armani, Gucci, Ted Baker, Tiffany and Co, Valentino, and Versace, it is the highest grossing mall in the United States, with higher sales per square foot than Rodeo Drive in Beverly Hills, California. The mall, which was 280,000 square feet at its 1992 opening, was expanded by 500,000 square feet in 1997. A third expansion, which began in 2002, added another 200,000 square feet to the property. The Forum Shops property is considered to be the most valuable real estate in Las Vegas.

=== Interior ===
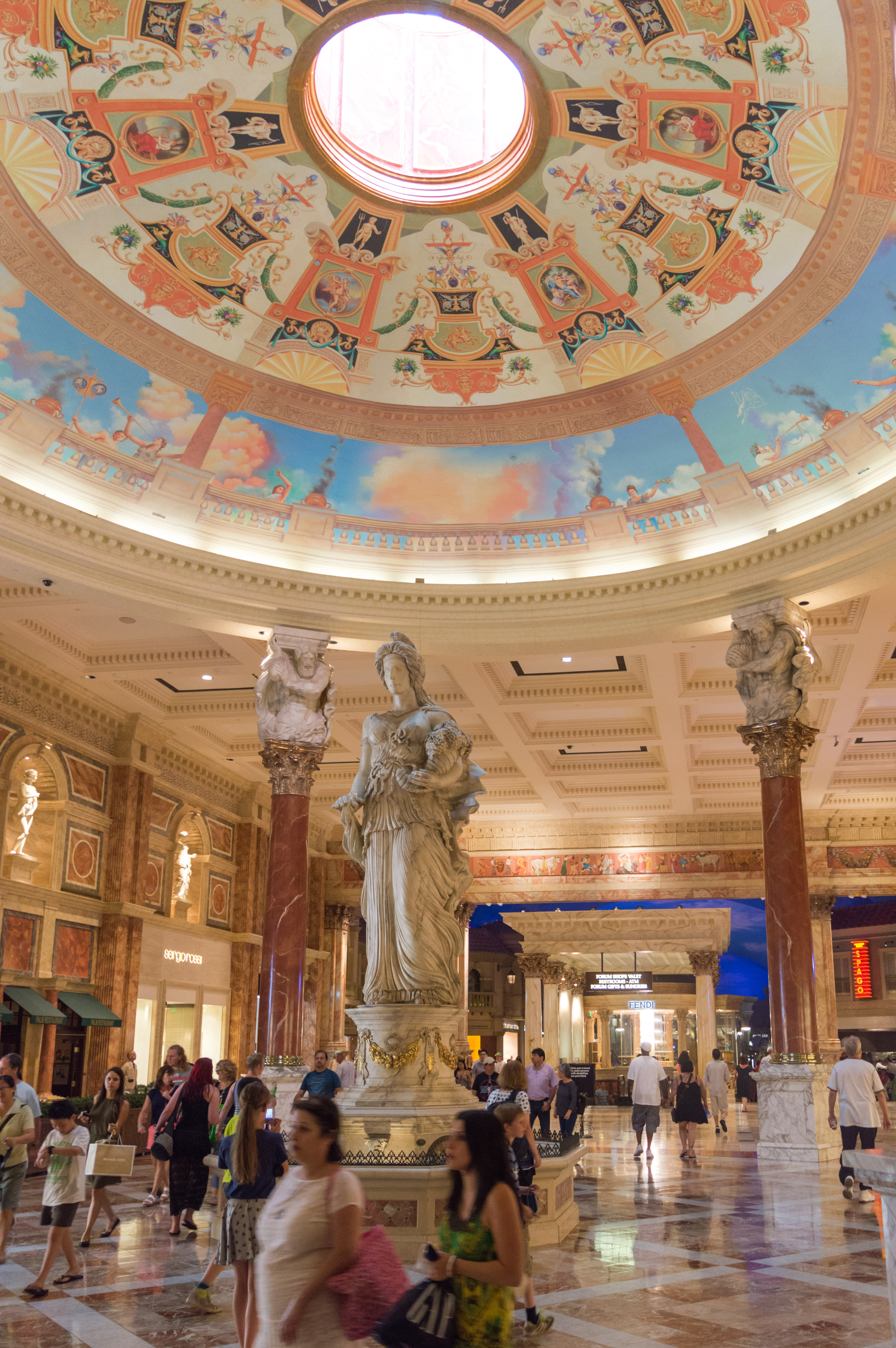
Hallway between casino and The Forum Shops, 2015

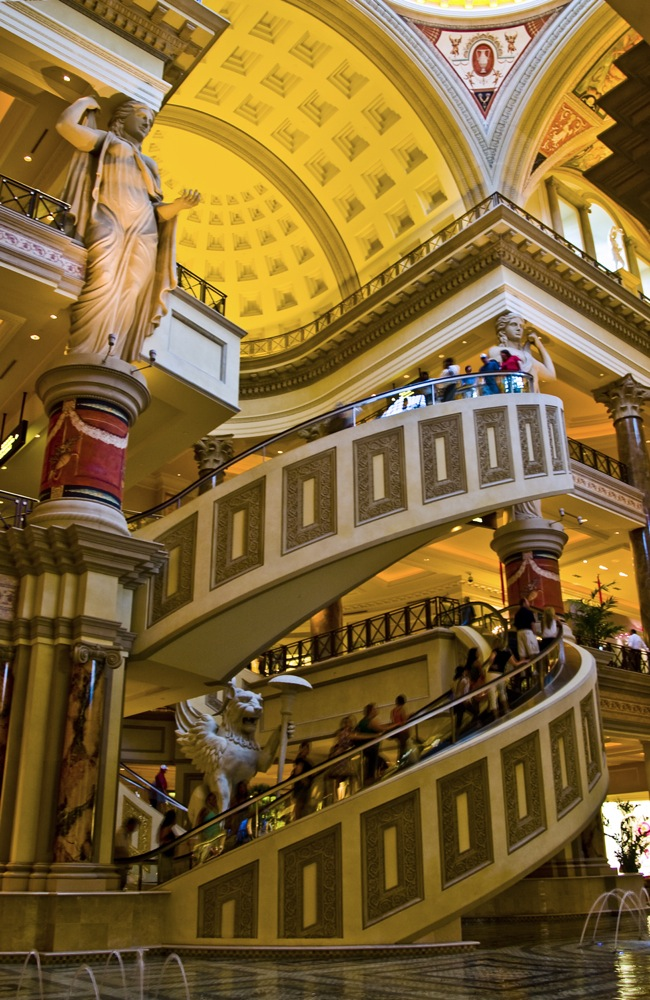
Spiral escalators, 2008

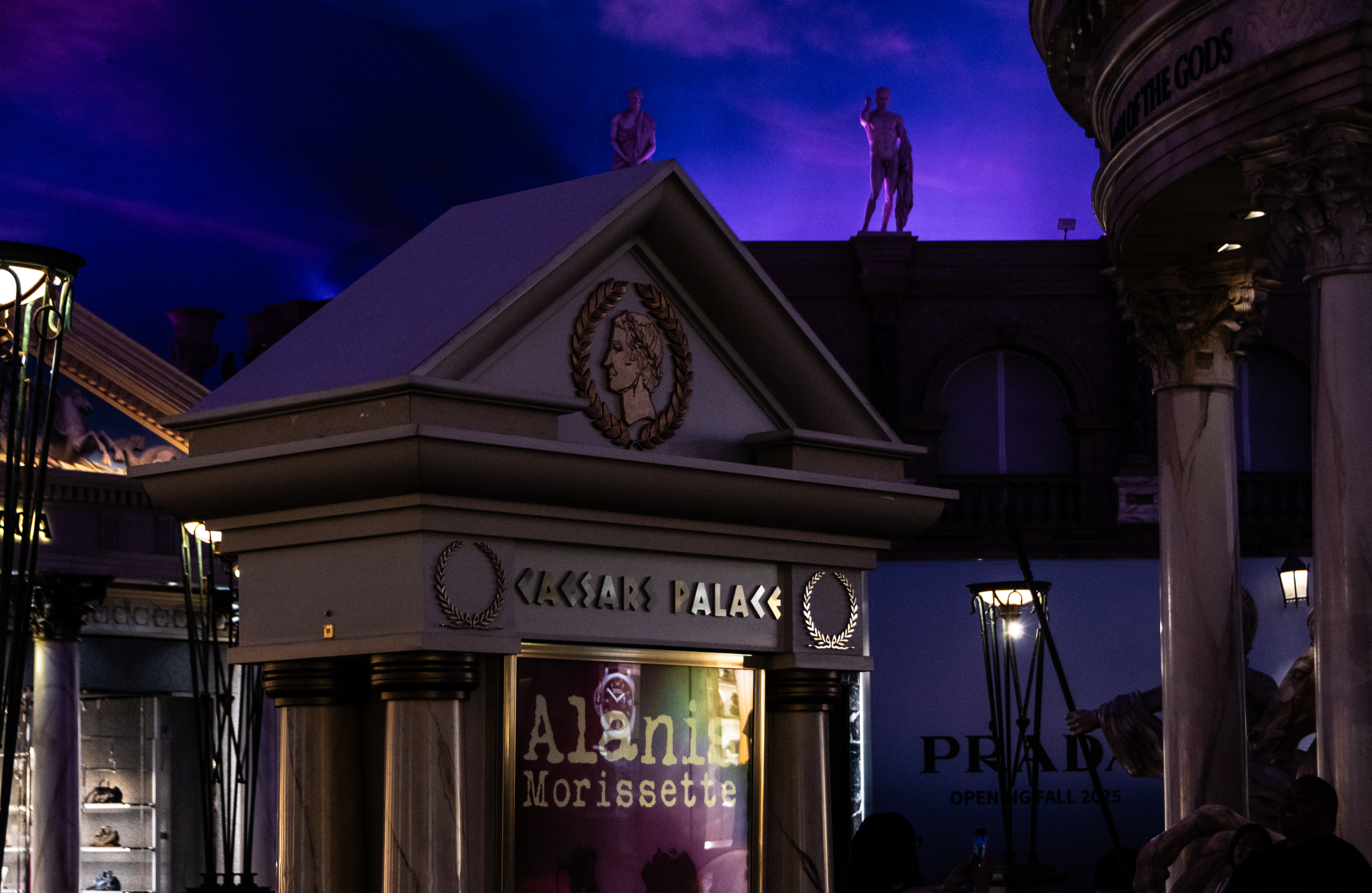
Illuminated interior of the Forum Shops

The original hotel tower had 680 rooms, and each featured a room with one wall which was fully mirrored from floor to ceiling. The hotel featured an 800-seat theatre restaurant and three public dining areas, two health clubs, an epicurean room, a convention hall of up to 2000 people and 20 separate halls and committee rooms, accommodating up to 5000 people in total. Marble was imported from Italy, rosewood from Brazil, with gold leafing throughout the place.

As of 2015, the hotel has 3,960 rooms and suites in six towers. In addition to its regular rooms and suites, Caesars Palace offers penthouse suites, and 14 villa suites named after notable Romans. A number of Roman statues were imported from Florence, Italy, valued at over $150,000. Statues of Julius Caesar and emperors such as Augustus and Nero are particularly common at the Palace. There are many variations of Augustus throughout, including two copies of the Prima Porta Augustus. Author Margaret Malamud notes the contrast between his "sober and pious figure" in the Olympic Lounge and the "statue of Nero and his lyre with which it is paired". There is a 25 feet (7.6 m) statue of the goddess Fortuna. One statue of David in the interior is an exact replica of an early 16th-century Michelangelo masterpiece, standing 18 feet (5.5 m) high and weighing over nine tons.

==== Caesars Forum and gambling facilities ====
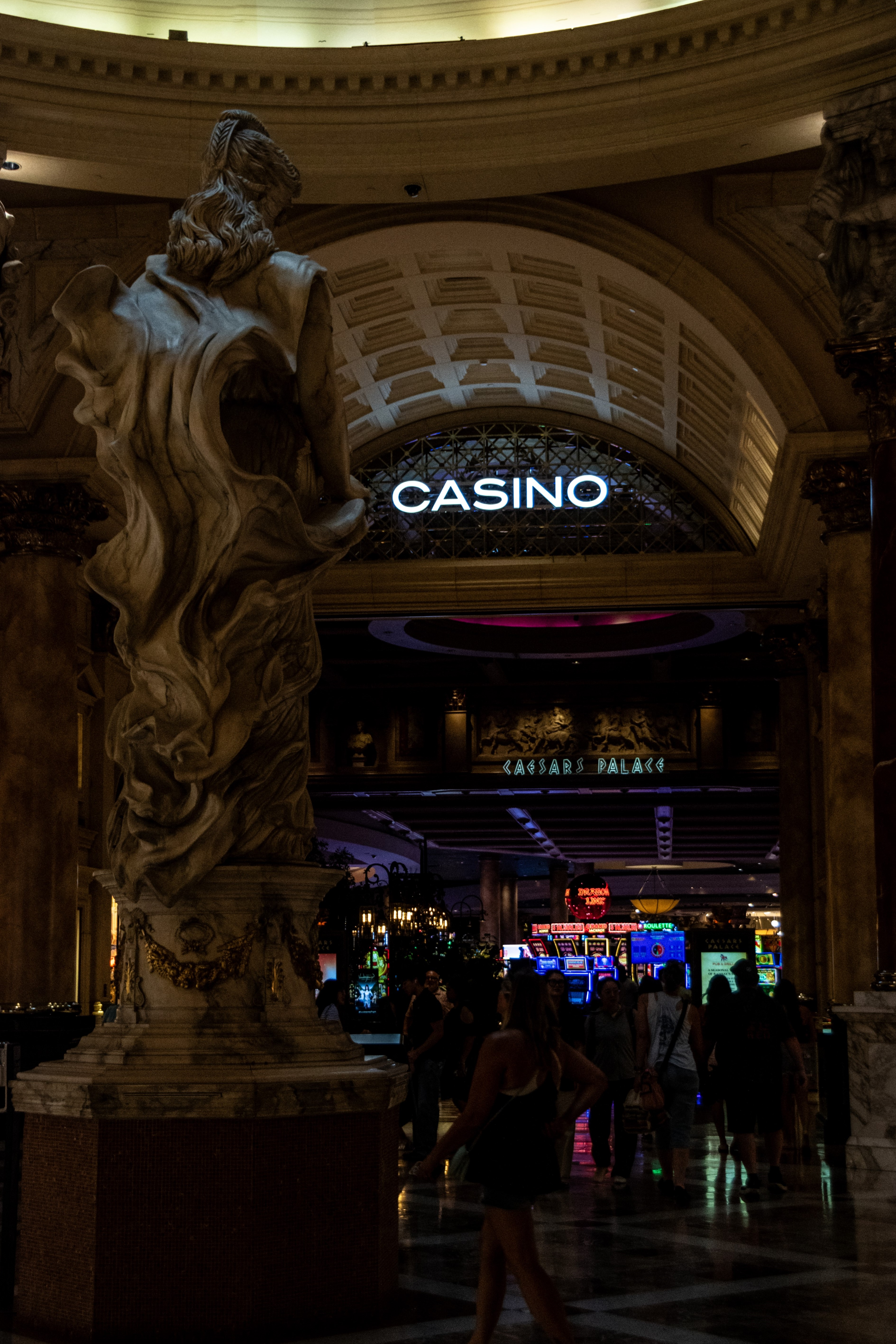
Interior entrance to the casino at Caesars Palace

Caesars Forum is the original casino of the hotel which opened in 1966 with 30 gaming tables and 250 slot machines. It contains 20 black Italian marble columns with white marble and gold leaf trimmings. Friezes and statues depict Roman conquests, and women motifs are prevalent. In the centre is a flat ornate dome with an "enormous chandelier in the shape of a Roman medallion, made of 100,000 handmade and handpolished crystals" on the ceiling. It reportedly held the world record at the time for the world's largest crystal ceiling fixture. The cocktail waitresses, as of 2005, still wear the same uniform which was designed by Jay Sarno: white, off-the-shoulder mini-tunics with high-heeled Roman sandals.

The modern casino facilities include table games such as blackjack, craps, roulette, baccarat, Spanish 21, mini-baccarat, pai gow and pai gow poker. Caesars Palace's 4,500 square feet (420 m^{2}) 24-hour poker room currently lies in heart of the gaming floor between The Colosseum and the Race & Sports Book, where racing and sports bets are put on. It moved there in June 2014, when Pure Nightclub underwent an expansion and annexed its space. As of December 2015 it contains 16 tables with free Wi-Fi and USB charging ports. There are many traditional reel-type slot machines, video reels machine, video poker games, video blackjack or keno, in which participants can play from 1¢ to $500. One author noted that due to the combination of darkness and enclosure of the gambling room, never being lit with light from the outside, it "disorients the occupant in space and time", and one "loses track of where he is and when it is".

== Entertainment ==
=== Music and showmanship ===
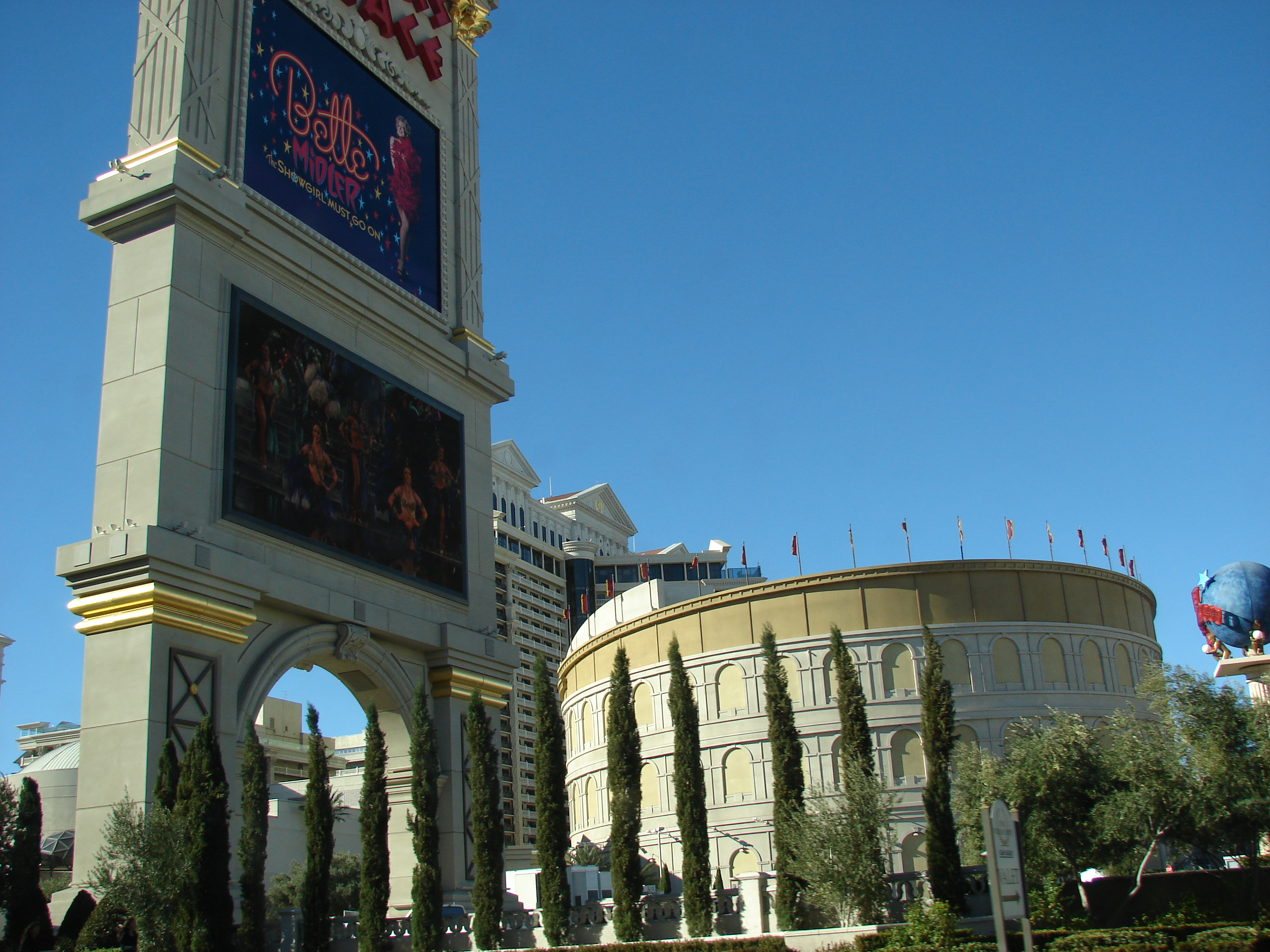
Exterior of the Colosseum in 2007

Many international performers have performed at the hotel, including Frank Sinatra, Sammy Davis Jr., Rod Stewart, Celine Dion, Cher, Bette Midler, Liberace, Liza Minnelli, Elton John, George Burns, Pat Cooper, Diana Ross, Teresa Teng, Paul Anka, Julio Iglesias, Judy Garland, David Copperfield, Stevie Nicks, Dolly Parton, Tony Bennett, Steve and Eydie, Gloria Estefan, Phyllis Diller, Luis Miguel, Ike & Tina Turner, Janet Jackson, Shania Twain, Jerry Seinfeld, Harry Belafonte, Louie Anderson, Ricky Martin, Mariah Carey, Deana Martin, B. B. King, The Moody Blues, Pilita Corrales, Matt Goss and Adele. In mid-1996, a new venue known as "Caesars Magical Empire" was created on the property, showcasing magicians such as Michael Ammar, Jon Armstrong, Lee Asher, Whit Haydn, Jeff "Magnus" McBride, and Alain Nu. The "Empire" was closed on November 30, 2002, after which the structure was razed to make room for a large concert hall created for singer Celine Dion. The Colosseum at Caesars Palace is a 4,296-seat entertainment venue with a 22,450 square feet (2,086 m^{2}) stage, which was originally built at a cost of $95-million for Celine Dion's show, "A New Day...", in 2003. A success, the Colosseum show earned almost $175,000 on average per night and grossed $500 million in four years. The venue has since hosted performances by numerous other artists. Gloria Estefan performed a special seven-day concert in October 2003 for the launch of her album Unwrapped, titled Live & Unwrapped. In May 2007, Bette Midler was announced as Dion's formal replacement, performing 100 shows a year, with Elton John continuing to perform his popular Red Piano show 50 nights a year while Midler was on hiatus. After taking a three-year hiatus, Cher, following her Farewell Tour, returned to Caesars Palace with a three-year contract, performing 200 shows beginning May 6, 2008.

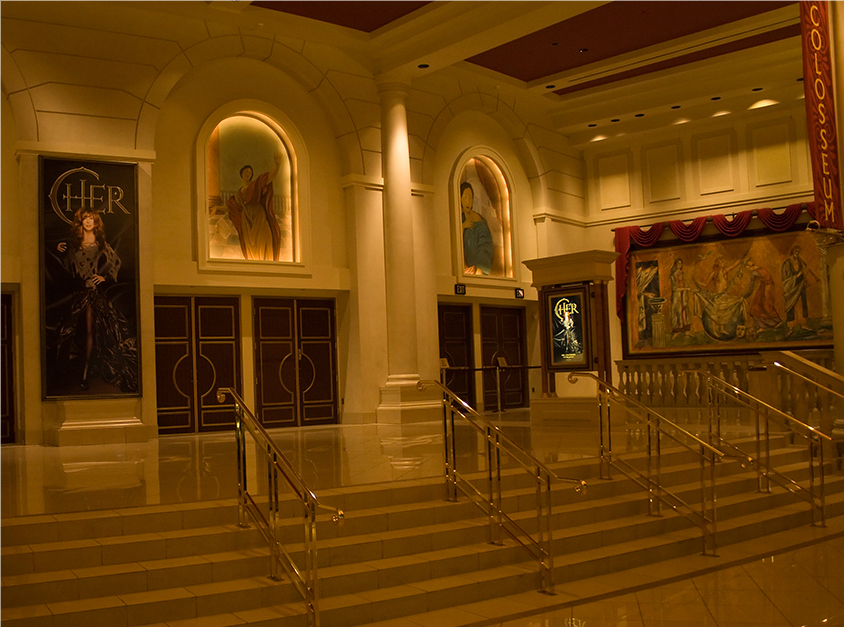
Outside of the theatre in 2008

On May 26, 2009, U.S. President Barack Obama performed in the Colosseum in the one-night show A Good Fight alongside Sheryl Crow, Bette Midler and Rita Rudner to fundraise for Nevada's senator Harry Reid re-election campaign. Several streets were closed and the Augustus tower was blocked as security precautions by the Secret Service during the visit. In March 2011, Celine Dion returned to The Colosseum with her new show entitled "Celine", which is under contract for 70 shows per year, through 2017. In 2015, Reba McEntire and Brooks & Dunn began a concert residency at the Colosseum titled Together in Vegas. Absinthe is a live show that premiered on April 1, 2011, on the forecourt of the hotel. The show is hosted by The Gazillionaire, played by actor and former Cirque du Soleil clown Voki Kalfayan and his assistant, Penny Pibbets, portrayed by actress Anais Thomassian. The show is performed outside in a Spiegeltent on a 9 feet (2.7 m) diameter stage. The tent accommodates 600 persons who are seated on folding chairs circled around the stage.

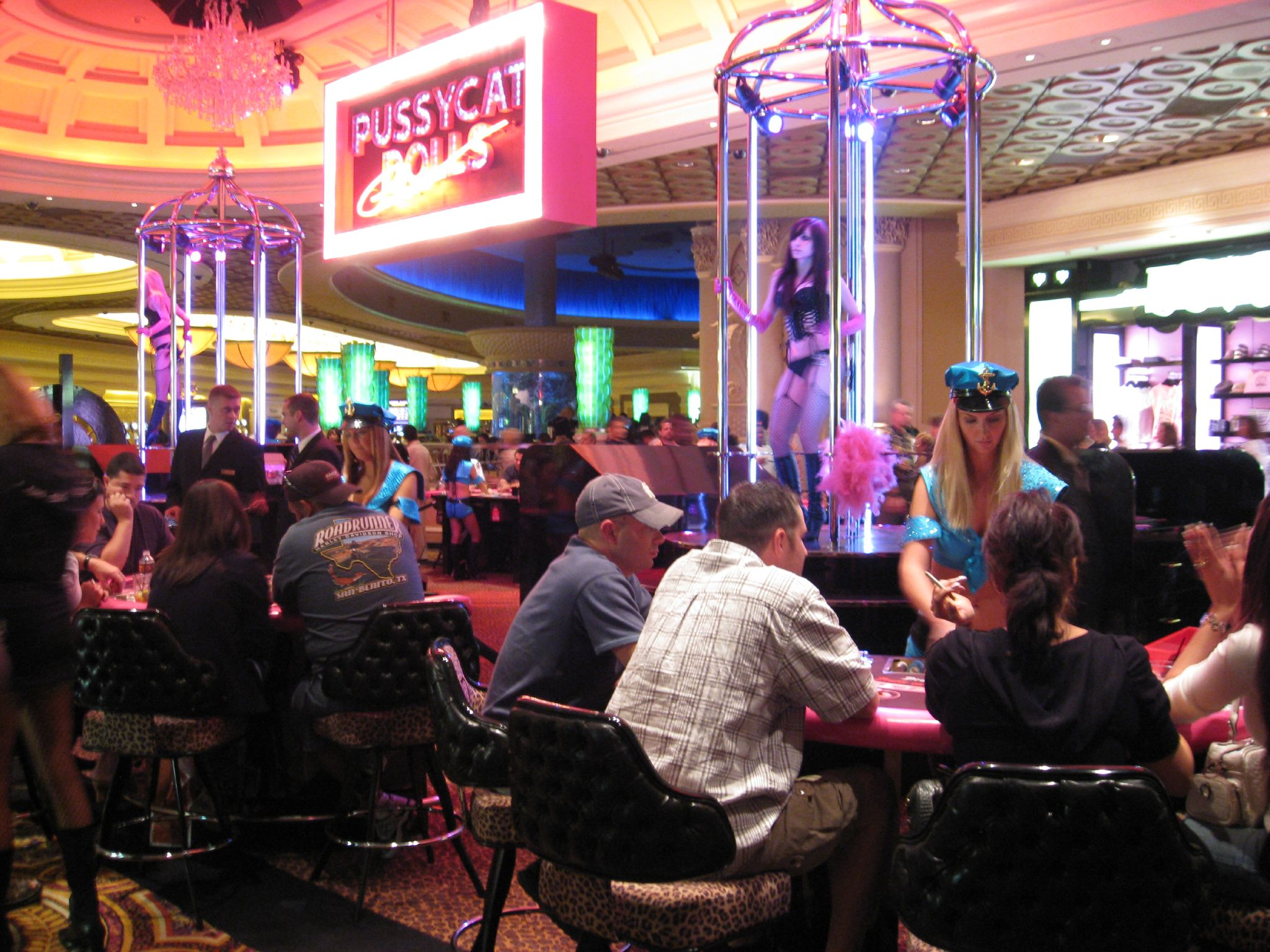
The Pussycat Dolls Casino in 2007

The Pussycat Dolls Lounge, an adjunct of the Pure Nightclub, opened at Caesars Palace in 2005. The lounge was patterned after a vintage strip club. The club's center was a stage where dancers called the Pussycat Girls clad in fishnet hose and corsets, began a new dance show every half hour. Celebrities like Paris Hilton and Christina Aguilera occasionally danced as "guest pussycats". In 2007, Caesars Palace opened a Pussycat Dolls Casino directly across from the Pussycat Dolls Lounge. It had an oval pit at the casino's center, where two go-go dancers in cages performed in response to the music. At the end of February 2010, the Pussycat Dolls left the Pure nightclub for a new lounge at the Chateau nightclub, which is part of Paris Las Vegas.

Caesars Palace is also the home of Omnia nightclub, replacing Pure nightclub which operated there for over a decade. The $107 million expansion and redesign incorporates both the 34,000 square feet (3,200 m^{2}) Pure facility and the adjacent World of Poker tournament room to create a 75,000 square feet (7,000 m^{2}) space that can accommodate 3,500 people. Designed by the Rockwell Group, the club is outfitted with theatrical lighting, sound, and climate-control systems, along with rigging and catwalks for aerial performers. It is operated by the Hakkasan Group.

The replica of Cleopatra's Barge houses a bar and lounge that opened at Caesars Palace in 1970. Rat Pack members Frank Sinatra and Dean Martin often visited the Barge, with Sinatra occasionally singing there after his own shows.

=== Sports ===
Caesars Palace Street Circuit
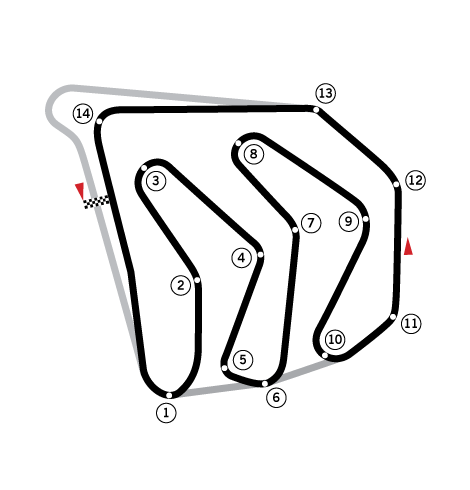
- Formula One Grand Prix Circuit (1981-1982)
- Location: Paradise, Nevada, USA
- Opened: October 17, 1981; 45 years ago
- Closed: November 11, 1984; 42 years ago
- Major events: Formula One; Caesars Palace Grand Prix (1981–1982); Can–Am; Caesars Palace Grand Prix (1981–1982); CART; Caesars Palace Grand Prix (1983–1984); Trans-Am Series; Caesars Palace Grand Prix (1983–1984)
- Website: http://www.caesarspalace.com

Grand Prix Circuit (1981–1982)
- Length: 2.268 mi (3.650 km)
- Turns: 14
- Race lap record: 1:19.639 ( (Italy) Michele Alboreto, Tyrrell 011, 1982, Formula One)

Modified "Distorted Oval" (1983–1984)
- Length: 1.125 mi (1.810 km)
- Turns: 5
- Race lap record: 38.000 ( (United States) Tom Gloy, Mercury Capri, 1984 Caesars Palace Trans-Am round, Trans-Am)

The New Yorker writes that Caesars Palace was "dubbed the Home of Champions after hosting decades of events like boxing matches, auto races, and volleyball tournaments". The Caesars Palace Grand Prix car race (a Formula One World Championship event) was held at the car park of Caesars Palace in 1981 and 1982. The new race proved to be a financial disaster, and was not popular among the drivers, primarily because of the desert heat and its counter-clockwise direction, which put a tremendous strain on the drivers' necks. When Nelson Piquet clinched his first World Championship by finishing fifth in 1981, it took him fifteen minutes to recover from heat exhaustion. The 1982 race was won by Michele Alboreto in a Tyrrell, but the race was not renewed for the following season due to poor attendance. The following two years a CART (IndyCar) event was run, with Mario Andretti and Tom Sneva winning, before the open-wheel event was permanently dropped. In 2013 it hosted a round of the Stadium Super Trucks.

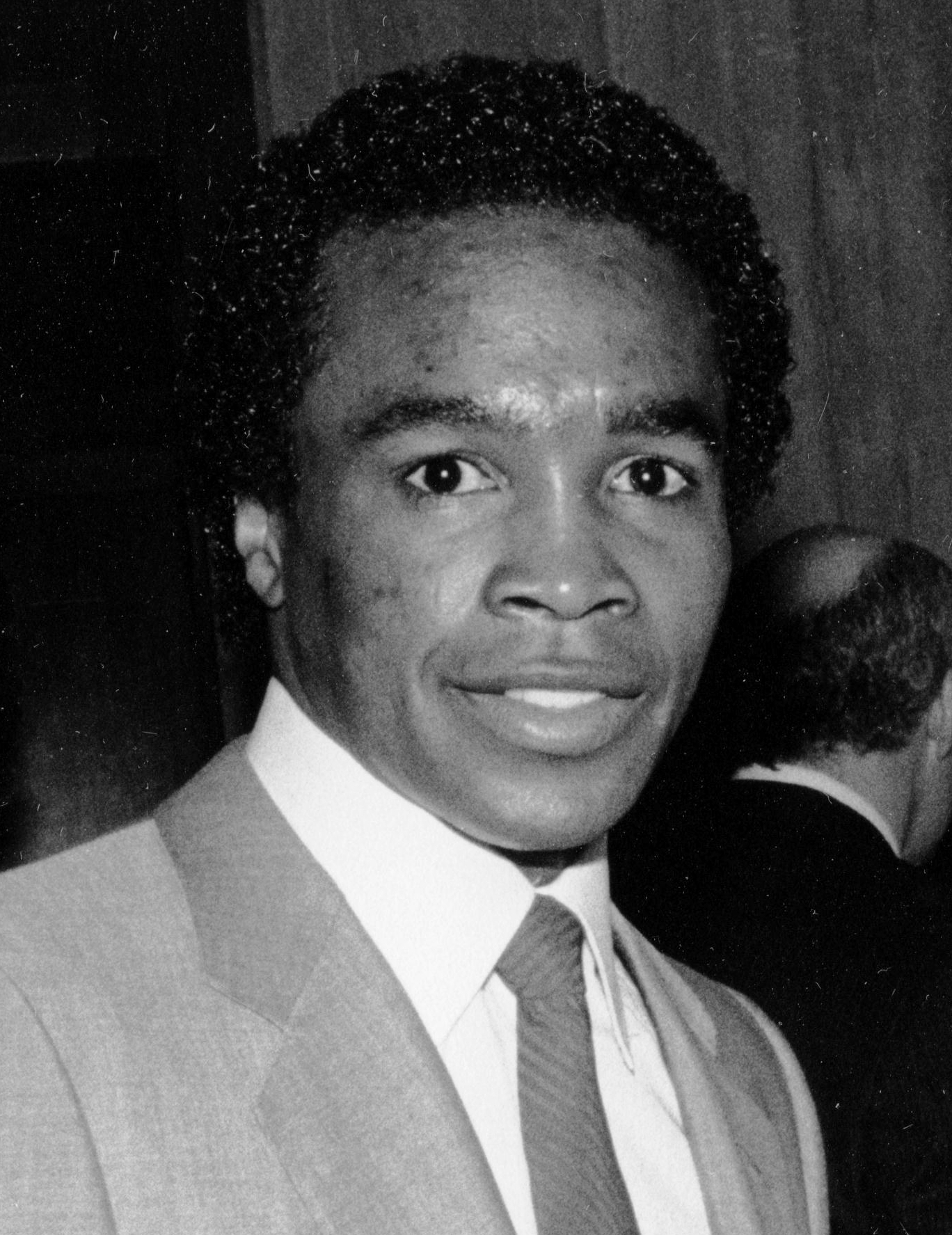
Sugar Ray Leonard in 1984

Many boxing matches have been held in Caesars Outdoor Arena and at its since demolished Sports Pavilion (an indoor sports arena) since the late 1970s. The hotel has hosted fights between George Foreman and Ron Lyle in January 1976, Roberto Durán and Esteban de Jesús in January 1978, Larry Holmes and Muhammad Ali in October 1980, Holmes and Gerry Cooney in June 1982 as well as Wilfredo Gómez versus Juan Antonio Lopez at the same date; Gómez's bout with Salvador Sánchez on August 21, 1981, Marvin Hagler vs. Roberto Durán and a world championship fight between Shane Mosley and Shannan Taylor. In April 1987, the 15,356-seat arena at Caesars Palace hosted "The Super Fight" boxing match between Sugar Ray Leonard and Marvin Hagler. Two bouts between Evander Holyfield and Riddick Bowe were contested here, including Evander Holyfield vs. Riddick Bowe in November 1992, and a revenge match a year later in which Holyfield took the title, and he fought with Michael Moorer at Caesars Palace, including Evander Holyfield vs. Michael Moorer in April 1994 for the WBA, IBF and Lineal Heavyweight Championships. In 2004 boxing returned to the Palace, when Wladimir Klitschko and former Olympian Jeff Lacy headlined a card televised on Showtime at the Palace's new outdoor amphitheatre.

Caesars Palace has played host to a number of professional wrestling events throughout the 1990s, the most notable of which is WWE's WrestleMania IX in April 1993 which capitalized on the Roman theme of the venue. Billed as the "Worlds Largest Toga Party" it remains to this day the only WrestleMania with a particular theme. World Championship Wrestling also held a series of events at Caesars Palace, including Clash of the Champions XXX in January 1995 as well as Clash of the Champions XXXII and an episode of WCW Monday Nitro, each in January 1996.

On September 27, 1991, a National Hockey League preseason game between the Los Angeles Kings and New York Rangers was held on an outdoor rink built in the Caesars Palace parking lot. Behind a goal from Wayne Gretzky, the Kings came back from a 2–0 deficit to win 5–2. The game served as a prelude to "Frozen Fury", an annual series of preseason games in Las Vegas played primarily against the Colorado Avalanche at the MGM Grand Garden Arena, and eventually the establishment of an expansion team in Las Vegas, the Vegas Golden Knights, for the 2017–18 NHL season.

== Restaurants ==
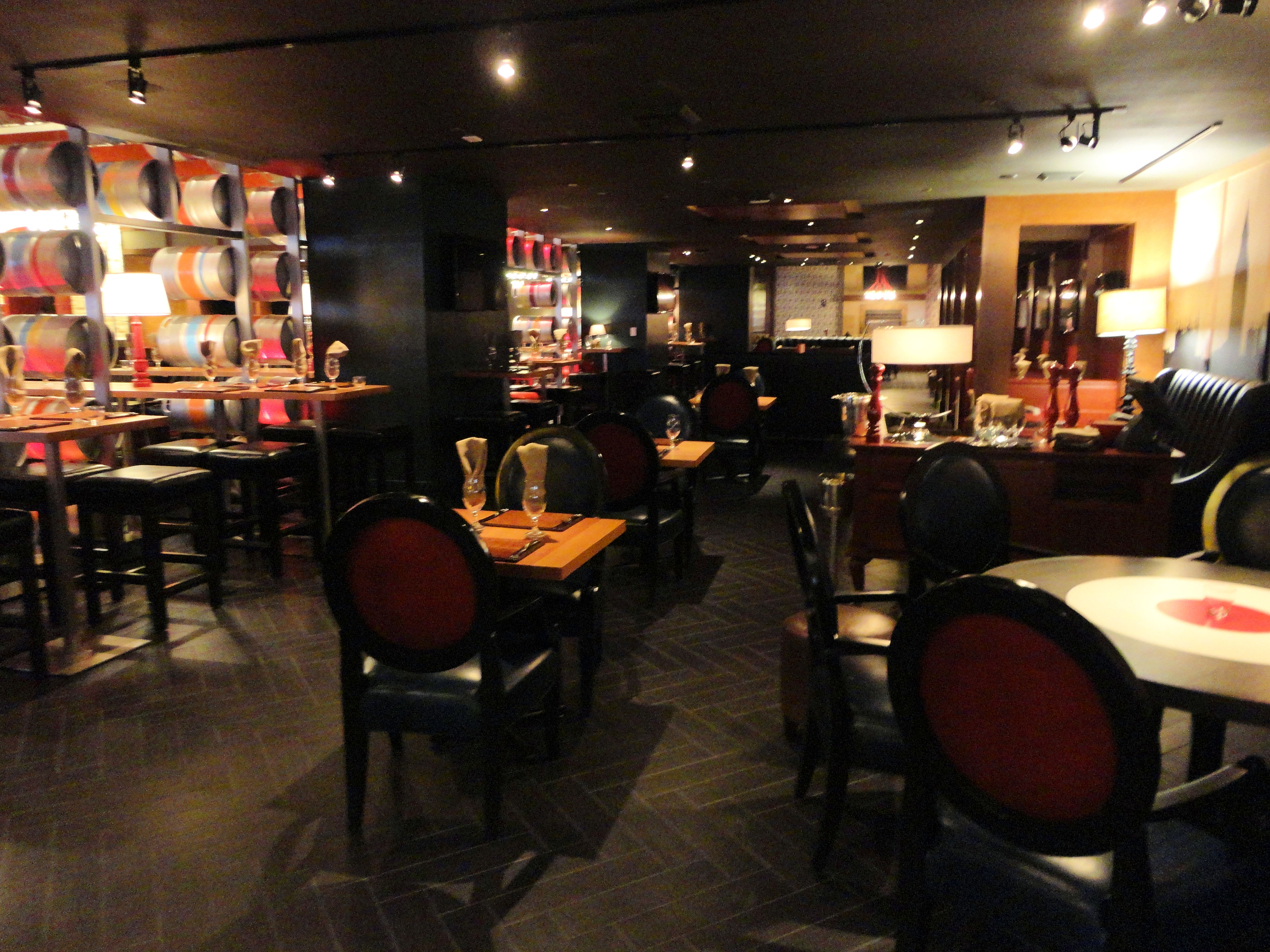
Gordon Ramsay Pub & Grill in 2012

The casino houses multiple restaurants. Gordon Ramsay Pub & Grill is an English-style pub, a type of restaurant Ramsay felt was "missing on the strip". The Nobu Restaurant is an Asian restaurant. The Old Homestead Steakhouse is the first west-coast location of a New York restaurant chain. Rao's opened in 2006, the second branch of the restaurant after New York City to open. Flay's first restaurant venture outside New York, Bobby Flay's Mesa Grill was opened at Caesars in 2004 and featured southwestern cuisine; it closed in November 2020 and was replaced in early 2021 with a "fish-and-pasta" concept called Amalfi by Bobby Flay. Chef Brian Malarkey opened Searsucker Las Vegas – the fourth branch of the restaurant after San Diego, Del Mar, California, and Austin, Texas – in March 2015. The 7,500 square feet (700 m^{2}) dining area has a "retro Americana" theme, with "cowboy culture" motifs reflected throughout the furnishings and paintings designed by Thomas Schoos. Beijing Noodle No. 9 is a Chinese restaurant with an overhead metal-cut white screen and large aquariums filled with goldfish, all backlit by LED bulbs. Serendipity 3 was a 1950s style diner, featuring burgers, fries and ice cream delicacies. The ice cream parlor themed restaurant, which was a branch of the New York City Serendipity 3 establishment, opened in 2009. In addition to seating in the dining area and counter seating, there was a patio with views of the Strip and the Caesars Palace fountains. It closed on January 2, 2017. Hell's Kitchen opened in its place in January 2018, and was originally planned to be used as the studio for the filming of the American television show Hell's Kitchen for Seasons 19 and 20, but with full bookings of customers to serve and a lack of cameras (and no dormitories for the contestants), shooting was instead moved to the Caesars Entertainment Studios property near the Las Vegas Strip. The major restaurant of the Augustus Tower is Restaurant Guy Savoy, namesake of the long-time Michelin-starred chef. When Savoy was approached to open a second restaurant in Vegas, he initially said no, until Caesars told him they wanted him to recreate what he had done in Paris. His request was that to maintain quality, the restaurant must be limited to service five days a week, to which the management agreed. The restaurant opened in 2006 and in 2008, Savoy brought his executive chef from the Paris restaurant to Vegas, there earning the venue two Michelin stars.

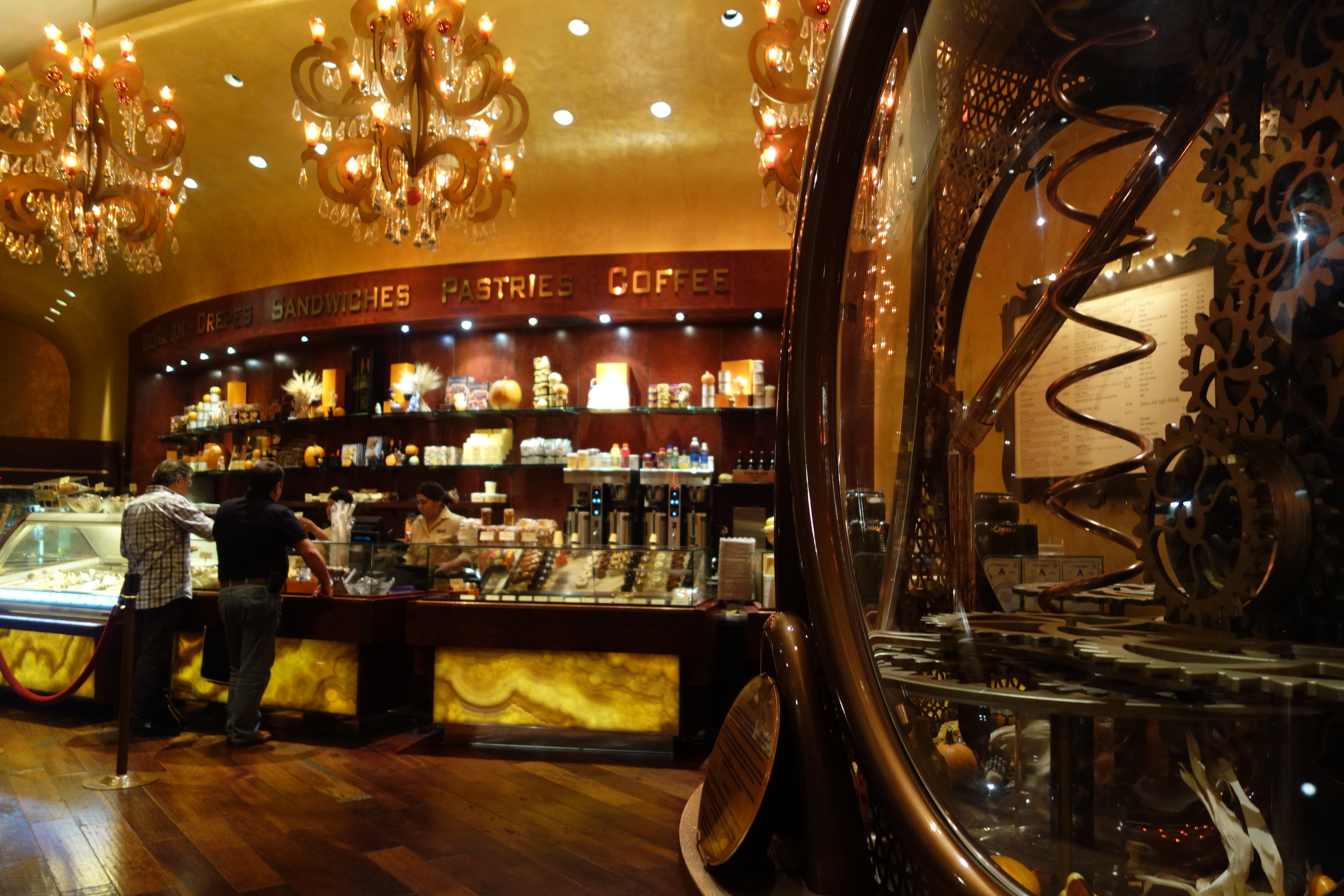
Interior of Payard Pâtisserie & Bistro with chocolate clock in foreground in 2013

Under the direction of pastry chef and chocolatier François Payard, Payard Pâtisserie & Bistro at Caesars Palace encompasses a pastry shop, chocolate shop, and restaurant serving breakfast, lunch, and dinner. The interior of the 46-seat bistro was designed by the Rockwell Group. In 2008 the bistro installed a 16 feet (4.9 m) high "chocolate clock" that releases three chocolate truffles every quarter-hour. In 1992 Wolfgang Puck was the first celebrity chef to open an upscale restaurant in a Las Vegas gambling resort with Spago at Caesars Palace. Located in The Forum Shops arcade, the restaurant is divided into a cafe facing the shopping mall serving lighter, lower-cost dishes, and a more formal dining room to the rear.

Central Michel Richard was a 24-hour restaurant situated in the hotel lobby from 2011 to 2014. In addition to a bar, it featured indoor and outdoor dining, with menu offerings varying by the time of day. Established in 2011, it cost US$4.5 million to build-out and measured 10,000 square feet (930 m^{2}) in size. Todd Harrington, executive chef, was chosen by Michel Richard, himself a James Beard Foundation Award-winning chef, to run the kitchen. Harrington had been the executive chef of Augustus Café, the restaurant which had previously operated in that location. Harrington left in December 2013, and in July 2014, the restaurant filed for bankruptcy protection. The restaurant closed in late 2014.

Café Americano occupies the former premises of Central Michel Richard. It was in May 2015, in partnership with the V&E Restaurant Group of Miami. The 3,585 square feet (333.1 m^{2}) restaurant and bar in the hotel lobby serves pizza, soups, sandwiches, burgers. A Mr. Chow restaurant opened at the hotel in 2015. The 277-seat Chinese fine dining establishment occupied the second floor of the hotel and had a view of the Garden of the Gods pool area until it closed in 2025.

In the early 2020s, new restaurants have opened at Caesars Palace. In 2022, Dominique Ansel, creator of the cronut, opened a bakery at Caesars Palace. In late 2023, Rao's was replaced by Peter Luger Steak House – a steak house based on the original location in Brooklyn. In 2024, The Old Homestead was replaced by Brasserie B – a French restaurant by Bobby Flay. In late 2024, Cleopatra's Barge was replaced by Caspian's – a cocktail and caviar lounge.

== In popular culture ==
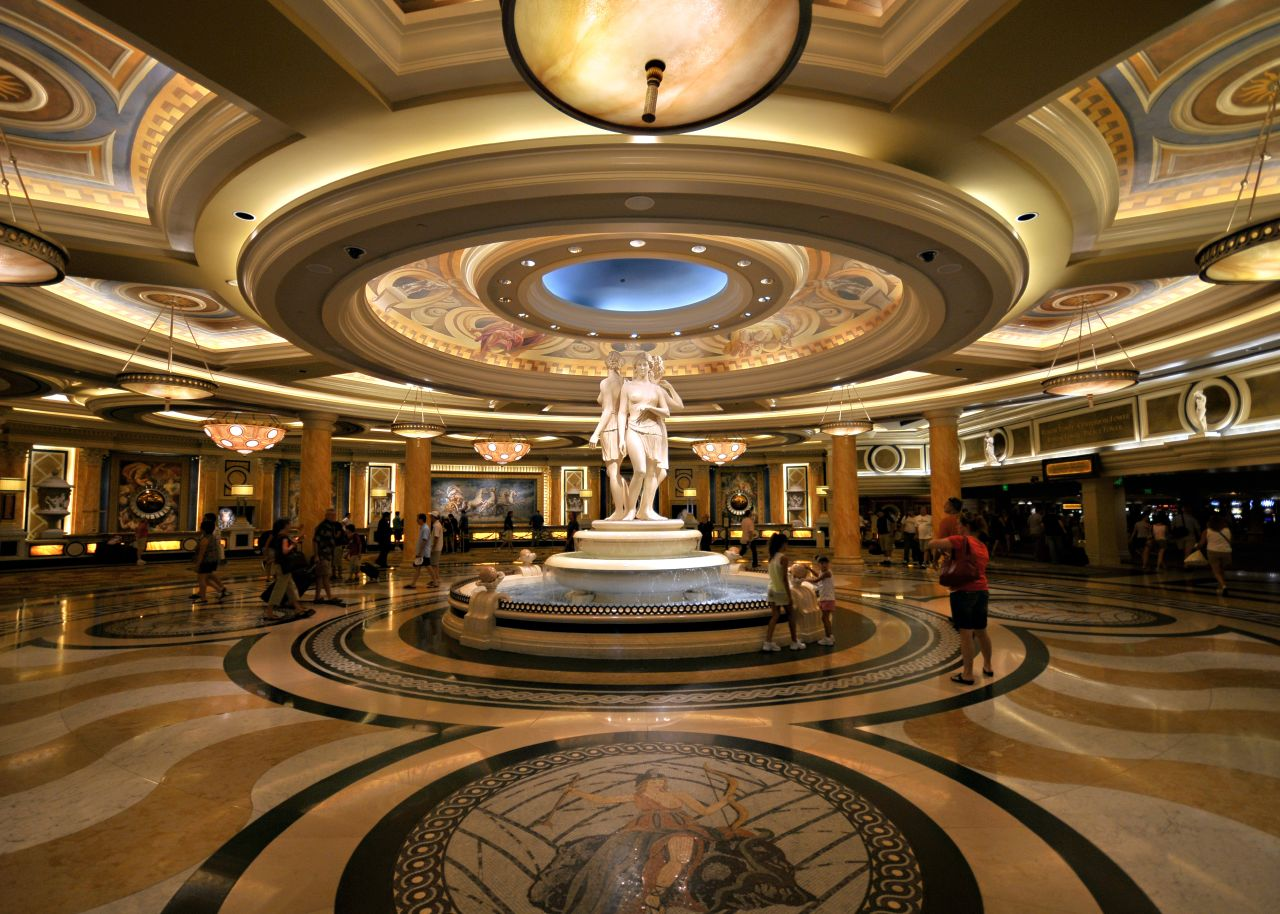
Lobby in 2008

Caesars Palace has been a location in numerous films. It has appeared in films such as Hells Angels on Wheels (1967), Where It's At (1969), The Only Game in Town (1970), The Electric Horseman (1979), History of the World, Part I (1981), Rocky III (1982), Oh, God! You Devil (1984), You Ruined My Life (1987), Rain Man (1988), Hearts Are Wild (1992), Fools Rush In (1997), Ocean's Eleven (2001), Intolerable Cruelty (2003), Dreamgirls (2006), Iron Man (2008), The Hangover (2009), 2012 (2009), The Hangover Part III (2013), with the featured hotel suite made available for guest stays, and Step Up: All In (2014).

In television it has appeared in series such as The Partridge Family, the "Viva Ned Flanders" episode of The Simpsons, The Sopranos, Friends, The Strip (1999), Marvel's Agents of S.H.I.E.L.D. and Keeping Up With the Kardashians. It also appeared in the season 12 premiere of America's Next Top Model. The short-lived 1990s game show Caesars Challenge taped in the casino's theatre and pulled contestants from the audience; losing players were given tickets to Caesars shows and dinner as a consolation prize, while an audience game played at the end offered audience members the chance to get casino chips and chocolate coins.

A version of the casino called Caligula's Palace is featured in the video game Grand Theft Auto: San Andreas, where it is located in Las Venturas (the game's equivalent of Las Vegas) and is the subject of one of the game's storylines where the player prepares for and pulls off a heist on the casino.

== See also ==
- Caesars Atlantic City
- Caesars Windsor
- List of largest hotels
- List of integrated resorts
