= Bacchanal Buffet =

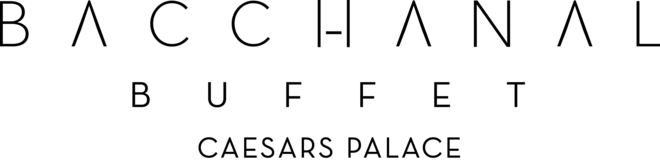

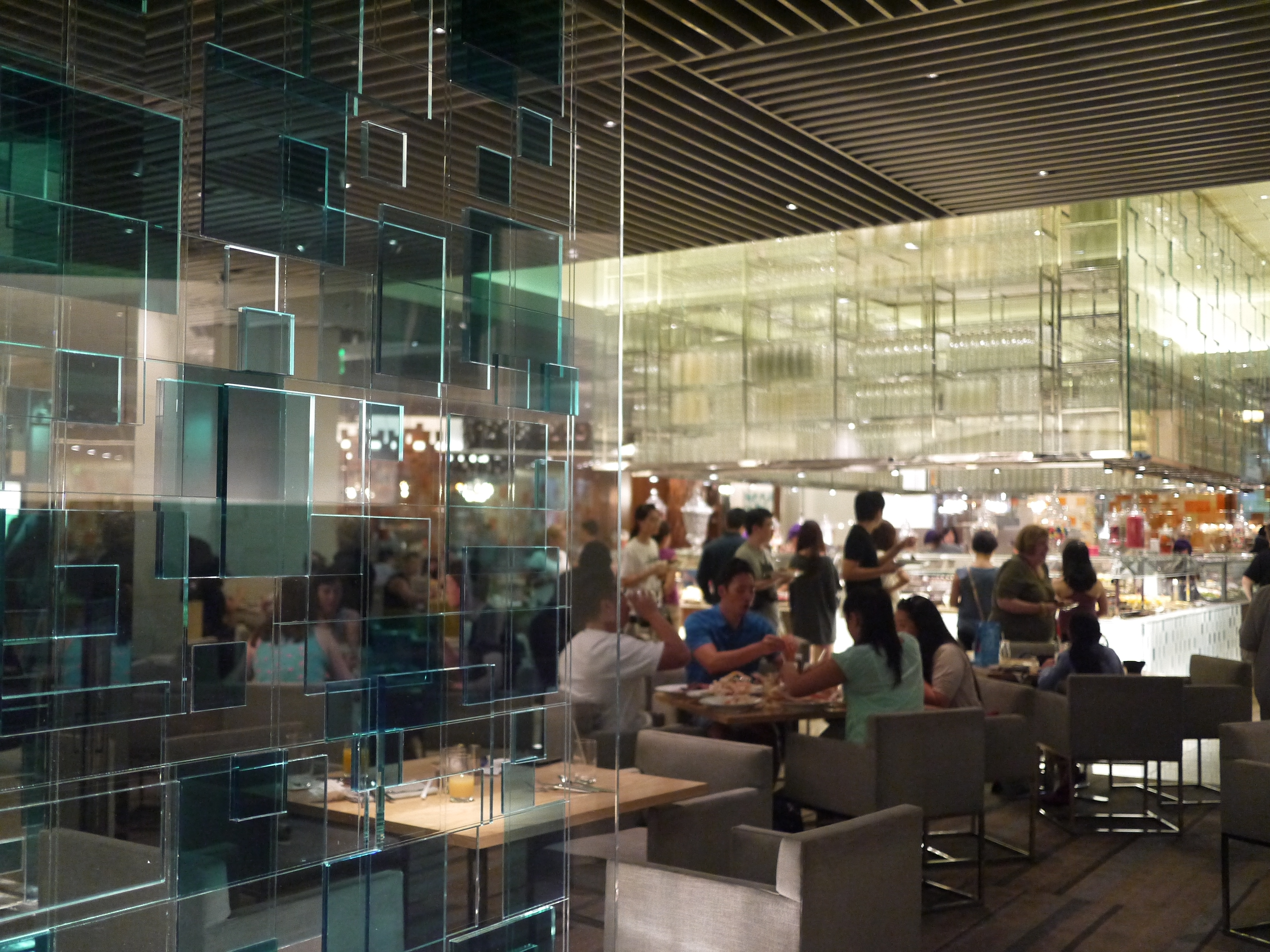
- Interactive map of Bacchanal Buffet

Restaurant information
- Established: September 11, 2012; 13 years ago
- Owner: Caesars Entertainment
- Chef: Josh Grimes
- Food type: International
- Dress code: Casual
- Location: 3570 South Las Vegas Boulevard, Las Vegas, Clark, Nevada, 89109, United States
- Coordinates: 36.11595°N 115.17623°W
- Seating capacity: 600
- Reservations: Yes
- Website: Official website

Bacchanal Buffet (formerly Café Roma, Palatium Buffet, Café Lago, Café Lago Buffet and Lago Buffet) is a buffet located at Caesars Palace in Las Vegas, Nevada. The buffet consists of nine show kitchens and over 500 daily dishes. Chefs at their own stations serve food at Bacchanal.

== History ==
The restaurant was opened on September 11, 2012, costing $17 million. The buffet won "Best Buffet" by USA Today in 2012 and 2013. It was also rated by the Las Vegas Review-Journal in 2013 and Las Vegas Weekly in 2013 and 2015.

The buffet was expanded to offer whole fish options including Norwegian mackerel and New Zealand tai snapper.

The restaurant, along with the rest of Caesars Entertainment's properties, was closed on March 17, 2020, due to the ongoing COVID-19 pandemic. On April 21, the restaurant "filed paperwork" for an unspecified renovation in response to challenges posed by the pandemic. The Los Angeles Times reported that the buffet will no longer be self-serve, with staff serving all food instead. The buffet reopened May 2021 as a fully self-service buffet.

== See also ==
- List of restaurants in the Las Vegas Valley
