= Alexis Readinger =

American hospitality designer

Alexis Readinger is an American hospitality designer based in Los Angeles, California. She is the founder of PREEN, an architecture and interior design firm established in 2005, whose approach to hospitality design emphasizes conscious, immersive environments.

== Career ==
A Texas native, Readinger earned a bachelor's degree from Vanderbilt University and a master's degree in architecture from the University of California, Los Angeles (UCLA). Before founding PREEN in 2005, she worked with hospitality designers Dodd Mitchell and Thomas Schoos.

Readinger's work has focused on the relationship between architecture, food, culture, and human experience, with longstanding collaborations involving independent chefs and restaurateurs.

In 2008, Readinger designed Akasha, a sustainably designed restaurant in a restored historic building in Culver City. The project incorporated environmentally conscious materials and energy-efficient elements. The Los Angeles Times praised Readinger's restoration and interior design.

In 2010, Readinger designed Hatfield's restaurant in Los Angeles. Writing in LA Weekly, Pulitzer Prize-winning food critic Jonathan Gold praised the restaurant's transformation and its newfound sense of occasion. The restaurant was later featured in Jon Favreau's 2014 film Chef, with Favreau praising its aesthetics, open kitchen, and spatial layout.

Her work supporting the culinary community includes Now Serving, a Los Angeles cookbook shop and gathering place for chefs and food writers, designed in 2017, and collaborations with chefs Susan Feniger and Mary Sue Milliken in 2019.

PREEN's international projects include Beran Island Surf Lodge, an off-grid resort in the Marshall Islands. Readinger has also expressed a longstanding interest in wellness-oriented architecture and restorative environments, including nature-based lodges, hot springs, and spaces that encourage connection with the natural world.

More recent projects include Jacaranda, a Los Angeles restaurant developed with chef Daniel Patterson in 2026.

== Awards and recognition ==
PREEN received its first American Institute of Architects Los Angeles Restaurant Design Award in 2007 for Omega nightclub. In 2009, Readinger was named to Boutique Design magazine's Boutique 18, recognizing emerging hospitality designers. The firm continued to receive national and international design awards throughout the following two decades, including being named Interiors Practice of the Year by World Interior News in 2020.

Among its most extensively awarded projects is Lucia, a fine-dining Afro-Caribbean restaurant in Los Angeles. In 2025, Lucia won Best Restaurant of the Americas and the Surface Interiors category for the Americas at the Restaurant & Bar Design Awards, as well as the Gold Key Award for Restaurant Upscale Dining. In 2026, Lucia was selected by Prix Versailles as one of the World's 16 Most Beautiful Restaurants.

== Professional activities ==
Readinger is a member of the American Institute of Architects and holds a green building credential. She regularly serves as a keynote speaker, panelist, and juror for architecture, design, and hospitality industry organizations, including the AIA and World Interior News. She has lectured at the Institute of Culinary Education and Los Angeles Trade-Technical College.

Readinger served on the board of the Chinatown Business Improvement District for over a decade and is a member of two Urban Land Institute (ULI) councils focused on hospitality, travel, and development.

Her work has been featured in The New York Times, Los Angeles Times, Architectural Digest, Interior Design, Elle Decor, Wallpaper*, and Robb Report. PREEN's restaurant designs Prime and Lucia were included in Robb Report's selections of America's Most Beautiful New Restaurants in 2022 and 2025, respectively.
