= Thomas Schoos =

German-American interior designer (born 1967)

Thomas Schoos (born October 29, 1967) is a German-American interior designer. Born and raised in Neuerburg, Germany, Schoos currently resides in West Hollywood, California, near his design firm, Schoos Design. The Schoos Design brand was founded in 1996.

Schoos’s work has been featured in numerous publications including The New York Times, Los Angeles Times, Architectural Digest, People, Food & Wine, GQ, Los Angeles and Angeleno magazines, Vogue and InStyle.

== Career ==
Schoos' career began as an artist in Cologne, Germany where he apprenticed for three years as a stonemason. This is also where he made his first entry into commercial design, designing and painting scenery for fashion shows and exhibits. In 1995, Schoos moved to Los Angeles, California where he opened his own studio/boutique with business partner Michael Berman, developing a celebrity clientele. Schoos continued exploring and branching out into new areas such as landscape and interior design. In 1997, he designed a home for Will Smith and Jada Pinkett, which was soon followed by more residential projects for celebrities like Ashlee Simpson, Courteney Cox, Ellen DeGeneres, Tommy Motolla and Jessica Simpson.

Schoos' first breakthrough commercial project was Tao Asian Bistro in Manhattan, completed in 2000, which at the time was the largest Asian restaurant in New York City. In 2001, he designed Koi Restaurant in Los Angeles which became a Hollywood hot-spot, with numerous photos in the press of celebrities entering and leaving. In 2003, Schoos and Berman designed, opened and operated their own restaurant, O-Bar, located next to the Schoos Design offices on Santa Monica Blvd. in West Hollywood, CA. O-Bar won Angeleno Magazine's Design of the Year Award for 2004. Two more Los Angeles restaurants were designed by Schoos in 2005: Citizen Smith in Hollywood and The Wilshire in L.A.

In 2005, Schoos was tapped to design Tao Las Vegas for the Venetian Hotel and Casino in Las Vegas. Tao Las Vegas became the highest grossing restaurant/nightclub in the U.S. Soon after, Schoos designed Tao Beach Nightclub, a poolside venue that is an extension of the original Tao Las Vegas. Later, in 2007, Schoos designed the Luxor Casino redesign, including Tender Steakhouse and LAX Nightclub. Based on the popularity of Schoos' work in Las Vegas, Vegas magazine called him one of the "Men Who Make Nightclub Magic."

The first major hotel project by Schoos was the redesign of the Huntley Hotel in Santa Monica, including the lobby, guestrooms and penthouse restaurant. The project won Hospitality Design magazine's Design Award for hotels in 2006, with the penthouse restaurant winning in the restaurant category in 2007. The hotel and penthouse were also featured in Architectural Digest and numerous other periodicals. Other hotel projects have included Hotel Frank and The Vertigo Hotel in San Francisco.

In recent years, Schoos has teamed with several celebrity chefs who have achieved fame on TV competition programs, opening a number of new restaurants in California and around the world. First, in 2010, Schoos partnered with multiple Iron Chef winner Masaharu Morimoto to design Morimoto Napa in Napa Valley, California and Morimoto Waikiki in the Modern Honolulu Hotel in Hawaii. In 2011, Schoos designed Morimoto Mexico City, which was a finalist for the Hospitality Design Award for Fine Dining. Schoos has also partnered with Top Chef contestant Brian Malarkey to design several restaurants, including Searsucker Restaurant in the Gaslamp District of San Diego, CA. which was voted by OpenTable.com readers as the second most popular restaurant in the U.S. Two other Searsucker restaurants followed in Del Mar, CA and Austin, Texas. Malarkey and Schoos have also collaborated on two restaurants called Herringbone, one in La Jolla, CA and the other on the Sunset Strip in Los Angeles. Herringbone La Jolla won an Orchid Award from the San Diego Architectural Foundation in 2012 for Best Interior Design. The same year, Herringbone was nominated along with Figue Restaurant in La Quinta, CA (another design by Schoos) for a Gold Key Award for Best Restaurant - Fine Dining, representing two of the three finalists in the field.

In 2012, Schoos' designs became increasingly international, with a new restaurant in Mumbai, India called Ellipsis, two George restaurants in Beijing, China and Taiwan, and portions of the Hotel Eclat in the Parkview Green complex in Beijing. Meanwhile, Schoos' designs have been particularly popular in the San Diego area, where, in addition to his previous three restaurants, Schoos added Puesto, a Mexican "street food" restaurant in the Headquarters complex, and Bottega Americano, an Italian restaurant and food market in the Thomas Jefferson Law School building, both in 2014. Puesto has been nominated for another Gold Key Award for Schoos Design, with the winner to be announced in November 2014. In May 2014, Schoos opened a new beach-themed cafe in his own city of West Hollywood, CA called Beach Nation, a new brand that he helped invent and co-owns.

== Projects ==
Bottega Americano, San Diego, CA	Beach Nation Cafe, West Hollywood, CA
Herringbone Restaurant, Los Angeles, CA	Herringbone Restaurant, La Jolla, CA
Puesto Restaurant, San Diego, CA	Morimoto Mexico City Restaurant, Mexico
Morimoto Napa Restaurant, Napa, CA	Morimoto Waikiki, Honolulu, HI
Searsucker Restaurant, San Diego, CA	Searsucker Restaurant, Del Mar, CA
Searsucker Restaurant, Austin, TX	Ellipsis Restaurant, Mumbai, India
Figue Restaurant, La Quinta, CA	Duplex Restaurant, Beverly Hills, CA
Tao Asian Bistro, New York City, NY	Tao Las Vegas Restaurant/Nightclub, Las Vegas, NV
Tao Beach Nightclub, Las Vegas, NV	Koi Restaurant, Los Angeles, CA
Huntley Hotel, Santa Monica, CA	Penthouse Restaurant at the Huntley Hotel, Santa Monica, CA
Hotel Frank, San Francisco, CA	The Vertigo Hotel, San Francisco, CA
Luxor Hotel Redesign, Las Vegas, NV	LAX Nightclub, Las Vegas, NV
Tender Steakhouse, Las Vegas, NV	O-Bar Restaurant, West Hollywood, CA
Citizen Smith Restaurant, Los Angeles, CA	Wilshire Restaurant, Los Angeles, CA
Table 8 Restaurant, Los Angeles, CA	Sol Restaurant, Newport Beach, CA

Additionally, residences designed by Schoos include the homes of celebrities Ashlee Simpson, Courteney Cox, Jessica Simpson, Nick Lachey, Tommy Mottola, and Will Smith and Jada Pinkett-Smith.

== Awards ==
- 2004: Best Restaurant Design, O-Bar, Angeleno magazine
- 2005: Wave of the Future Award, Hospitality Design magazine
- 2006: Design of the Year, TAO Restaurant and Nightclub, Hospitality Design magazine
- 2007: Interior Superior award, Hollywood Life magazine
- 2007: 1st place in Restaurant (Fine Dining), The Penthouse restaurant at The Huntley Hotel, Hospitality Design magazine
- 2008: “Stars of Design” honoree at the annual design trade show WESTWEEK
- 2010: Top 2 Hospitality Projects for 2011, North Bay Business Journal - Morimoto Napa
- 2011: Hospitality Design Award Finalist - Morimoto Mexico City
- 2012: Orchid Award, Best Interior Design, San Diego Architectural Foundation - Herringbone Restaurant
- 2012: Gold Key Award Finalist, Fine Dining - Herringbone Restaurant
- 2012: Gold Key Award Finalist, Fine Dining - Figue Restaurant
- 2014: Gold Key Award Finalist, Casual Dining - Puesto Restaurant
