= Tamares Real Estate Investments =

- Company type: Subsidiary
- Industry: Real estate
- Headquarters: 41 Dover Street; Mayfair, London; United Kingdom
- Area served: International
- Key people: Poju Zabludowicz
- Products: Real estate investment, Real estate management, Real estate development
- Parent: Tamares Group
- Website: www.tamares.com

Tamares Real Estate Investments is a global, privately owned real estate investment company based in London. It is a subsidiary of Tamares Group, headed by Poju Zabludowicz.

== Overview ==
Tamares is the largest landholder in downtown Las Vegas, owning 40% of the land. Tamares acquires and operates its properties.

Today, Tamares Group holds a $3 billion portfolio. Its real estate holdings encompass 2.3 million square feet of office space.

== Selected Properties ==
Currently, Tamares owns the following real estate properties:

- Plaza America
- 41 Dover Street
- 1500 Broadway
- 45 Wittener Street, Bochum, Germany
- 66 St. John Street, London, England
- 25-11 38th Avenue, Long Island City, NY
- Plaza Hotel & Casino
- Daniel Herzliya Hotel
- Shizen Spa Herzliya
- Shizen Spa Dead Sea
- 7950 Jones Branch Drive
- West Lagoon Resort Netanya

== Past holdings ==
- Argyle House - sold in December 2002
- 1-6 Lombard Street - sold in September 2005
- Princes House - sold in October 2005 for around £120 million
- The Tides Hotel - sold in February 2006
- The Gold Spike - sold in July 2007 for $15.6 million
- The Western - sold in March 2013 for $14 million
- Las Vegas Club - sold in August 2015 for $40 million
- Daniel Dead Sea Hotel, West All Suite Tel Aviv and West All Suite Ashdod - sold in November 2020 for NIS155 million
