= Stephen Crystal =

American gambling industry businessman

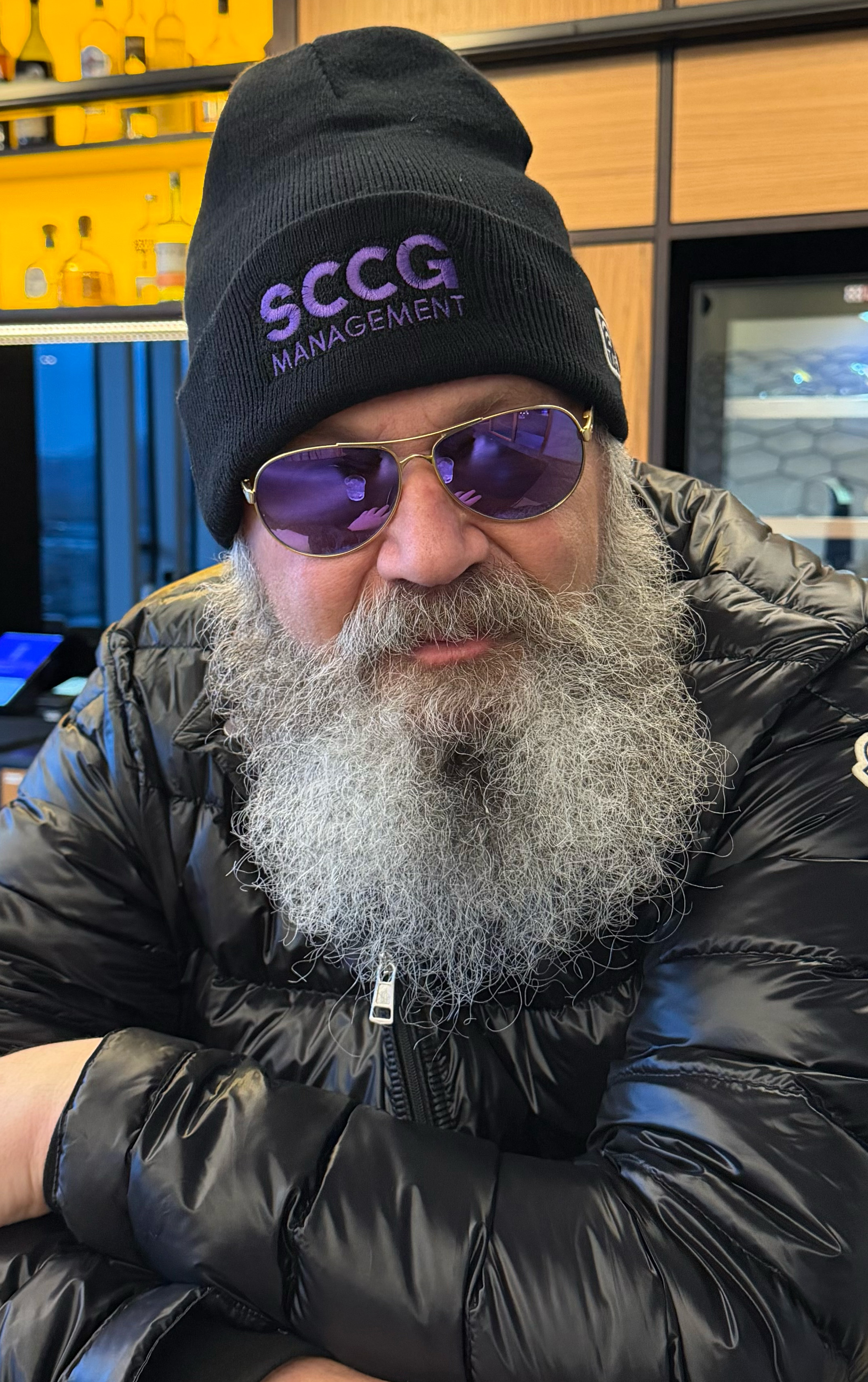
Stephen Crystal in 2025

Stephen Alan Crystal is an American former legislator, lawyer and a personality in the international gambling industry. In 2004, he co-founded Barrick Gaming Corporation, acquiring properties in Las Vegas, predominantly on Fremont Street, including the Gold Spike, Plaza, Las Vegas Club, The Western along with the Golden Nugget Laughlin. Since 2005 he has also served in many roles, such as president of Symplify, TableMAX Gaming Inc, partner of the MASL and as an advisory board member of Play Globally. He is active as an ambassador for several platforms, businesses, organisations, in Esports and betting.

Crystal is known for his involvement with indigenous communities, helping American Indians to establish Native American gaming businesses. He currently resides in Las Vegas.
