= Navegante Group =

Gaming company in Nevada

- Industry: Gaming
- Founded: 1996
- Founder: Larry J. Woolf
- Headquarters: Paradise, Nevada
- Products: hotel casinos
- Website: Navegante Group

The Navegante Group is a gaming company based in Paradise, Nevada, specializing in areas of casino management, development, consulting and executive recruitment. It is often retained to manage distressed properties while new owners seek a gaming license.

== History ==
After six years as the chairman, President and CEO of MGM Grand Casino in Las Vegas, Larry J. Woolf formed Navegante. Navegante's first major development and management contract was Casino Niagara in 1996.

When the Ontario government pursued development of casino gaming in Niagara Falls, Canada in 1996, officials selected 27 potential development groups including three publicly traded companies. The Niagara plan called for a temporary gaming facility under tight construction time frames. In June, Navegante was selected to head construction and development of their first casino with a planned opening scheduled for December of that year. To meet this deadline, construction ran 24 hours a day, 7 days a week. As Navegante had projected, the property generated $2 million per day in revenue and $1 million per day in profit. The government of Ontario received its investment back in 180 days. Upon opening, Casino Niagara was known, in the industry, as being the most profitable casino operation, on a square foot basis, in the world.

In 2005 Navegante was contracted by Tamaras Group to take over the existing operations as the lessee/manager of four hotel/casino properties in downtown Las Vegas: the Plaza, Las Vegas Club, Western and Gold Spike. Navegante, in conjunction with Tamaras, was responsible for a rapid and dramatic turnaround, taking the properties from major losses to positive cash flow. In May 2007, Navegante provided Tamaras with notice of termination of the lease agreements. In 2008, operations of these casinos were transitioned to another company.

On August 1, 2007, Navegante was approved to operate the Sahara Casino while the new owner, SBE Entertainment, worked to obtain their own license.

In May 2009, Navegante joined with other partners in forming Aqueduct Entertainment Group to bid on the casino to be built at Aqueduct Race Track. The group won the bid on January 29, 2010. The partners in Aqueduct Entertainment Group are: GreenStar Services Corporation, Turner Construction Company, Levine Builders, The Darman Group, Empowerment Development Corporation, PS&S Design, Siemens AG and Clairvest Group.

In March 2012, the company was approved to operate the Hooters Casino Hotel, which was being bought out of bankruptcy by Canyon Capital Advisors. In November 2012, Navegante took over management of the LVH – Las Vegas Hotel and Casino after it was bought at a foreclosure auction by Goldman Sachs and Gramercy Capital.

== Projects ==
=== Development ===
- Casino New Brunswick, Canada
- Grey Eagle Casino, Alberta, Canada
- Casino Fandango
- Casino Niagara

=== Casinos operating ===
- Gold Country Inn & Casino
- High Desert Inn
- Red Lion
- Westgate Las Vegas

==== Previous operations ====
- Casino Fandango
- Casino Niagara
- Gold Spike
- Grand Sierra Resort
- Hooters Casino Hotel
- Las Vegas Club
- Plaza Hotel & Casino
- Sahara Hotel and Casino
- Western Hotel & Casino
