= Tamares Group =

Global private investment group based in London

- Type: Private
- Founder: Shlomo Zabludowicz
- Headquarters: 41 Dover Street; Mayfair, London; W1S 4NS; United Kingdom
- Number of locations: 11
- Area served: International
- Key people: Poju Zabludowicz (chairman and CEO)
- Products: Investment management, equity investment, real estate investment, venture capital, growth capital, fund of funds, real estate development
- Owner: Poju Zabludowicz
- Subsidiaries: Tamares Real Estate; Tamares Private Equity; Tamares Media; Tamares Leisure; Tamares Telecom
- Website: www.tamares.com

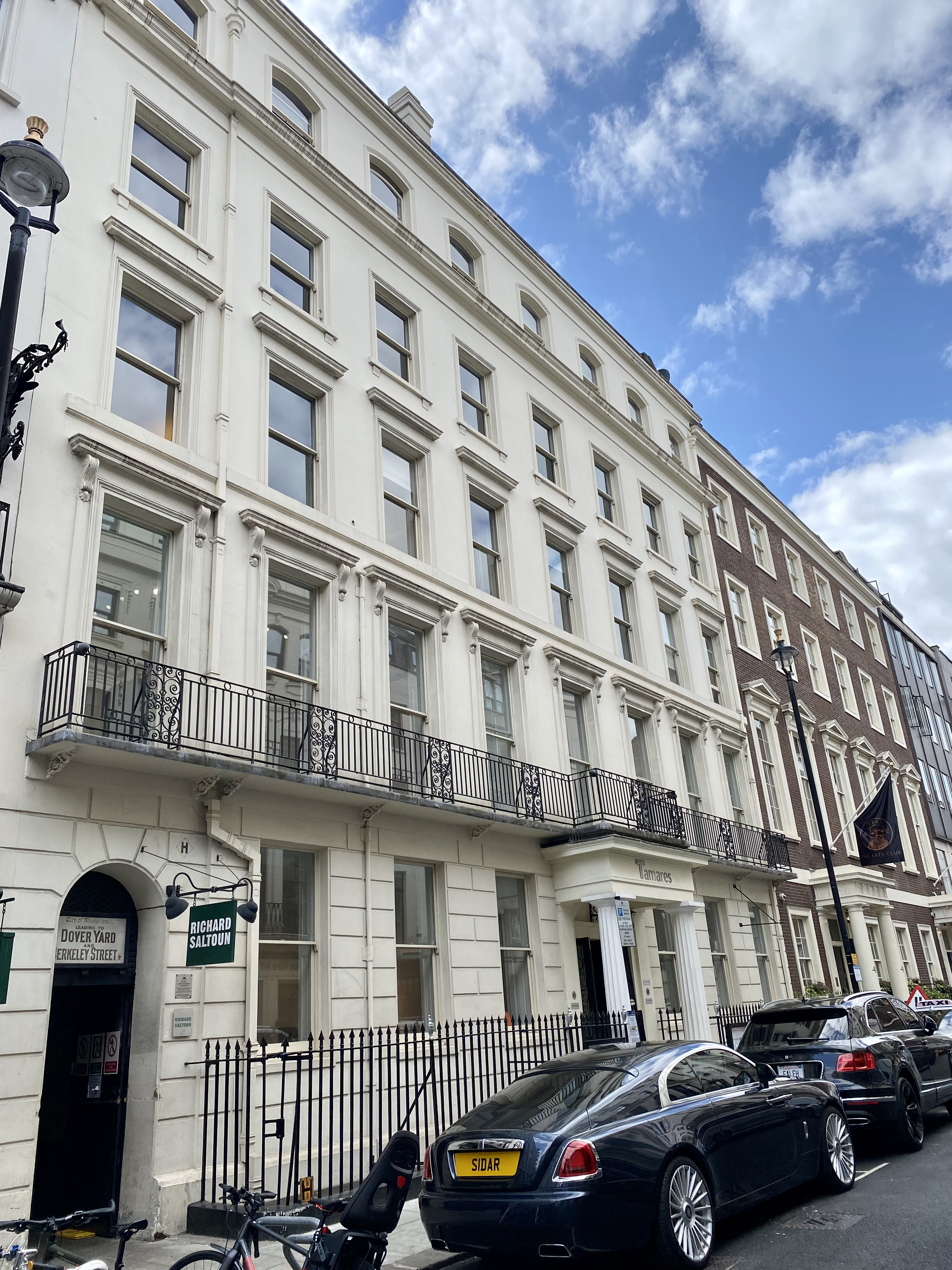
The headquarters of Tamares at 41 Dover Street, in London's Mayfair district

Tamares Group is a private investment group based in London. Tamares has international interests in real estate, finance, technology, communications, manufacturing, leisure and media. The group invests in a number of different private and public companies, and in real estate properties.

Tamares was founded after the Second War by Shlomo Zabludowicz, an entrepreneur of Polish Jewish origin. Since 1990, it has been headed by his son, Poju Zabludowicz.

Today, Tamares Group holds a $3 billion portfolio. Its real estate holdings encompass 2.3 million square feet of office space.

== Portfolio ==
Currently, Tamares holds equity stakes in the following private and public companies:

Private companies:

- Addepar - a wealth management platform that provides investment professionals with the tools required to manage complex global portfolios
- AImotive - an ADAS and autonomous driving software for self-driving cars, based on artificial intelligence, computer vision and sensor fusion
- Answerbook - develops a software that automates and personalizes e-mail marketing for e-commerce
- Dori Media Group - international entertainment group active in the production, distribution and broadcasting of telenovelas
- EcoStream - develops lubricants by recycling and re-refining used engine oils
- Foris Telecom - global wireless broadband mobile WiMAX carrier and Internet service provider
- KNL Networks - Finnish network communications company
- LogDNA - cloud log management system
- Mustavaaran Kaivos - engages in the exploration of Mustavaara vanadium-iron-titanium deposits
- OneSignal - push notification service for mobile apps
- Plate IQ - food and inventory management software for the restaurant industry
- Pontifax - venture capital fund with $350 million of assets under management, focusing on the Israeli life sciences sector
- RoboteX - designs and manufactures personalized robots for monotonous, dangerous or challenging environments
- Se-cure Pharmaceuticals - clinical stage, biotech company focused on developing safe and effective therapeutic solutions, targeting high prevalence medical conditions
- Siklu - builds gigabit wireless backhaul solutions operating in the E band and V band 60, 70 & 80 GHz millimeter wave bands
- Singa - digital karaoke service
- Tamares Telecom - Israeli service provider that supplies and operates communication and network infrastructure services Placed alongside the older Med- Nautilus cable, Tameres Telecom laid the undersea cable connecting Israel to the internet. Guy Caspi was a co-founder and former CEO of Tamares Telecom. As of the summer of 2015, Golan Telecom and the Palestinian Telecommunication Group are some of Tameres Telecom's clients.
- Tower Vision - tower management company specializing in the provision of passive infrastructure to the wireless telecommunications industry
- Varjo Technologies Oy - a Finnish-based startup developing an augmented reality headset
- Wolt - a Finnish-based smartphone app that allows customers to pre-order food from over 200 restaurants across Finland

Public companies:

- Knafaim (TASE: KNFM) - Israeli-based holding company focused on the aviation industry, controlling shareholder of El Al
- Mellanox (Nasdaq: MLNX) - provider of InfiniBand chipset, company went public on NASDAQ in 2007
- Palantir Technologies (Nasdaq: PLTR) - develops and builds data fusion platforms for integrating, managing, and securing any kind of data at massive scale
- Protalix (AMEX: PLX) - biopharmaceutical company focused on the development and commercialization of recombinant therapeutic proteins

Past holdings:

- Axis Mobile - complete mobile email solution, acquired by Synchronica in August 2008 for $4.9 million
- British Israel Investments - property management company in the field of shopping mall and commercial centers, acquired by the Melisron Group in 2011 for an implied valuation of $700 million
- Dione - smart card-based payment systems, acquired by Lipman Electronic Engineering in October 2004 for $104 million
- eXalink - WAP gateway, acquired by Comverse Technology in 2000 for $550 million
- N-trig - provider of digital pens and chips for touch screens, acquired by Microsoft in February 2015 for $200 million
- NodePrime - a next-generation infrastructure management and analytics platform, acquired by Ericsson in April 2016
- Outotec (Nasdaq Helsinki: OTE1V) - develops and provides technology solutions for the sustainable use of Earth's natural resources, Tamares sold its stake in March 2018
- Panaya - automation-technology startup, acquired by Infosys in February 2015 for $200 million
- Restamax (Nasdaq Helsinki: RESTA) - Finnish-based company with a chain of some 100 restaurants, cafés, nightclubs and pubs in Finland, Tamares sold its stake in September 2015 for €6.9 million
- Storwize - online storage optimization through real-time data compression, acquired by IBM in July 2010 for $140 million

== Business history ==
=== 1990s ===
- In 1995, Tamares acquired 1500 Broadway in New York City.
- In 1995, Tamares opened the Plaza America, a 165,000 square feet retail center in Washington DC, on 27 acres (11 ha) acquired in 1988.

=== 2000s ===
- In March 2004, Tamares acquired 40 acres (16 ha) in downtown Las Vegas in a joint acquisition with Barrick Gaming Corporation from Jackie Gaughan for $82 million. Tamares was the major investor with Barrick being mainly involved with operating the casinos. The purchase included:
  - The Plaza
  - Las Vegas Club
  - The Western
  - Gold Spike
  - Ambassador East Motel
- In June 2005, Tamares acquired total control of the hotels and casinos from Barrick, including the Nevada Club Hotel & Casino and Queen of Hearts Hotel & Casino, as well as 40 other commercial and residential sites in downtown Las Vegas. However, Barrick was retained as the lessee of the casinos since Tamares does not hold a Nevada Gaming License.
- In December 2005, Tamares entered into a lease agreement with Navegante to operate the Las Vegas casinos through a subsidiary called PlayLV. The Queen of Hearts was later acquired by LiveWork Las Vegas.
- In July 2007, the Gold Spike was sold for $15.6 million to Gregg Covin.

=== 2010s ===
- In March 2011, Tamares put a bid of approximately $3 billion to purchase the whole of Warner Music Group.
- In January 2012, The Western was closed for an indefinite period of time.
- In March 2013, The Western was sold for $14 million to a company affiliated with Tony Hsieh's Downtown Project, a campaign to revitalize the Fremont Street area.
- In April 2013, Tamares announced that the Las Vegas Club will be closing its hotel. The casino will remain open. A possibility of a renovation for the hotel was hinted.
- In June 2013, it was announced that the ViaEuropa consortium has won the tender for the Israel Electric Corporation (IEC) fiber optic communications infrastructure joint venture. Tamares Telecom is one of the four companies in the consortium, headed by ViaEuropa. ViaEuropa will own half of the consortium, while each of the four Israeli companies will own 12.5%. The consortium will own 60% of the fiber optic venture, and IEC will own 40%. The venture is expected to cost about $1.4 billion.
- In September 2013, it was reported that Tamares will participate in a financing round, estimated at $15–20 million, for N-trig.
- In January 2015, it was announced that Tamares is bidding to manage Eilat's Princess Hotel.
- In June 2015, Tamares has invested in Wolt, a Finnish-based smartphone app that allows customers to pre-order food from over 200 restaurants across Finland.
- In July 2015, it was announced that Tamares will acquire TEGNA, Inc.'s McLean corporate headquarters for $270 million. Gannett Co., Inc., parent of USA Today has signed a 12-year lease with Tamares to remain in the building. Previous owner, TEGNA, has agreed to an 18-month lease for 20% of the office space in building.
- In August 2015, the Las Vegas Club was sold to Derek and Greg Stevens, owners of The D casino, for $40 million.
- In August 2015, Tamares has participated in a $18 million Series-D funding round for Siklu.
- In September 2015, Tamares sold its stake in Restamax for €6.9 million.
- In July 2016, Tamares has participated in a $1.6 million round of funding for LogDNA.
- In October 2016, Tamares has participated in a €9.3 million round of funding for KNL Networks.
- In November 2016, Tamares has participated in a $10.5 million round of funding for AImotive.
- In March 2017, Tamares has participated in a $4 million round of seed funding for Plate IQ.
- In June 2017, Tamares has participated in a €1.75 million round of seed funding for Singa.
- In January 2018, it was reported that Tamares plans to construct a second building with office or residential uses, at the previously acquired TEGNA office building. The project would include open space around the tower, and perhaps as many as 400 new residential units and 5,000 square feet of retail.
- In January 2018, Tamares has participated in a $240 million round of funding for the fifth fund of Pontifax, an Israel-based venture capital firm focused on investments in the healthcare sector.
- In March 2018, Tamares sold its €80 million stake in Outotec.
- In January 2019, it was reported that Tamares sold 10% of its stake in Knafaim, parent company of El Al, for NIS23 million. After the deal, Tamares owns 3% of Knafaim.

=== 2020s ===
- In November 2020, it was reported that real estate developer Israel Canada Ltd. has acquired three hotels in Israel from Tamares Hotels for NIS155 million.
