= Barrick Gaming Corporation =

Hotel and casino corporation in Nevada

- Company type: Public
- Industry: Gaming
- Founded: 2004
- Headquarters: Enterprise, Nevada
- Owner: D.W. Barrick and Stephen Crystal

Barrick Gaming Corporation is a private company that was founded by D.W. Barrick and Stephen Crystal. The company formerly operated several hotels and casinos in Las Vegas, Nevada. The company is currently based in Las Vegas.

== History ==
In 1993, Barrick formed a joint venture with Station Casinos to develop a riverboat casino in Kansas City, Missouri.

On March 25, 2004, Barrick Gaming purchased and began operating several properties from Jackie Gaughan, a longtime Las Vegas casino owner, for $82 million. The casinos included:

- The Gold Spike
- Plaza
- Las Vegas Club
- The Western

Gaughan retained ownership of the El Cortez Hotel & Casino. In the deal, Barrick had the option to purchase the property through a right of first refusal. While it was not announced at the time, Barrick shared ownership of the buildings with Tamares Real Estate Investments, which also owned the land under the properties.

In October 2004, Barrick acquired the Queen of Hearts Hotel & Casino and the Nevada Hotel & Casino.

On November 10, 2004, Barrick announced that it would acquire the Golden Nugget Laughlin for $31 million, plus working capital. As part of the purchase agreement, Poster Financial Group granted Barrick a two-year limited use of the Golden Nugget brand name, after which Barrick would be required to change the property's name.

However, on May 31, 2005, the agreement for Barrick Gaming to acquire the Golden Nugget Laughlin expired without a final deal being reached. As a result, Landry's Restaurants, Inc. acquired the property as part of its agreement to purchase the Golden Nugget Las Vegas.

In a further development, on June 28, 2005, Barrick announced that it would sell its interest in the first four properties it acquired to privately owned Tamares. In addition, it also sold its interest in about 40 other properties in Las Vegas.
