= The Siegel Group =

American diversified company

The Siegel Group, Inc.
- Industry: hospitality
- Founded: 2001
- Headquarters: Las Vegas, Nevada
- Area served: Arizona, California, Nevada, Oklahoma, Texas
- Key people: Steve Siegel (President & CEO)
- Products: multifamily housing, extended-stay apartments, hotels, commercial real estate
- Number of employees: 1,300 employees (2016)
- Divisions: Siegel Suites; Siegel Select
- Website: www.siegelcompanies.com

The Siegel Group, Inc. is an American real estate, entertainment, and hospitality company based in Las Vegas, Nevada. The company purchases existing hotel and apartment complexes, then converts them into other facilities across multiple U.S. states. The company was criticized for its "uniquely egregious" tactics to evict tenants during the COVID-19 pandemic.

== History ==
The Siegel Group was founded in 2001 by Steve Siegel, who is chief executive officer and president of the company.

The Siegel Group also owned the Gold Spike Hotel and Casino in downtown Las Vegas from February 2008 until selling it in April 2013 to Tony Hsieh's Downtown Project.

By 2009, the Siegel Suites chain operated apartment complexes in Las Vegas and Mesquite, Nevada, totaling 3,000 units. Siegel had also purchased the Mount Charleston Hotel and renamed it as Resort on Mount Charleston. Siegel Group later purchased the closed St. Tropez, a 150-room hotel in Las Vegas across from the Hard Rock Hotel. The company renovated and reopened it in 2010, as a boutique hotel called Rumor. Siegel eventually sold Rumor in 2017, to a group of Hong Kong buyers who renamed it Serene Vegas.

Atrium Suites, a hotel located next to the Hard Rock, was planned to reopen in 2009, after renovations. However, the project encountered financial problems and never reopened. The Siegel Group purchased it in 2011, and planned to renovate it and reopen it in 2013, under a new name. At six stories, Atrium Suites was the largest building ever owned by Siegel Group. It was a significant part of the Siegel Group's portfolio, although it did not open as scheduled, as the company had not decided on how to use the building. Siegel Group had also been busy renovating other properties. Siegel eventually put the hotel up for sale in 2016, then decided to convert it into an apartment and extended-stay facility. In 2019, Siegel announced that he would tear down the closed Atrium Suites building and construct a Siegel Suites in its place. It would be the second Siegel Suites to be built from the ground up. An earlier Siegel Suites began construction in Las Vegas in 2017.

In June 2015, The Siegel Group acquired a property in Arizona from Legacy Suites for $8.3 million. The group purchased three buildings in 2017 located in Houston, Oklahoma, and San Antonio for roughly $18.94 million. In May 2019, the group acquired two buildings in Las Vegas for $8.35 million with plans to turn them into a hub for eateries.

A United States House of Representatives subcommittee investigating evictions during the COVID-19 pandemic found The Siegel Group to be one of four corporate landlords that continued to engage in evictions despite a moratorium issued by the Centers for Disease Control and Prevention in September 2020. A report from the House subcommittee called The Siegel Group's tactics "aggressive" and outlined actions such as sending security to knock on tenants' doors during the night, replacing air conditioning units with nonfunctional units, and calling Child Protective Services and animal control services on tenants.

The Siegel Group acquired a parcel of land on the northern Las Vegas Strip in 2022. Two years later, the company acquired the Gateway Motel property. The company has also expanded its retail footprint through acquisitions in downtown Las Vegas, including Fremont Street properties.

== Operations ==
The Siegel Group's business model focuses on acquiring hotel and apartment properties and converting them into flexible-stay housing. The company operates apartment and extended-stay hotel properties under brands including Siegel Suites and Siegel Select.

As of 2022, the company operated approximately 12,000 units across multiple U.S. states.

As of 2019, Judith Siegel is executive vice president and Michael Crandall is senior vice president of the company.

Siegel Cares is the philanthropic division of the Siegel Group which organizes events, provides donations, and offers housing assistance.
