= Miss Behave's Mavericks =

Las Vegas variety show

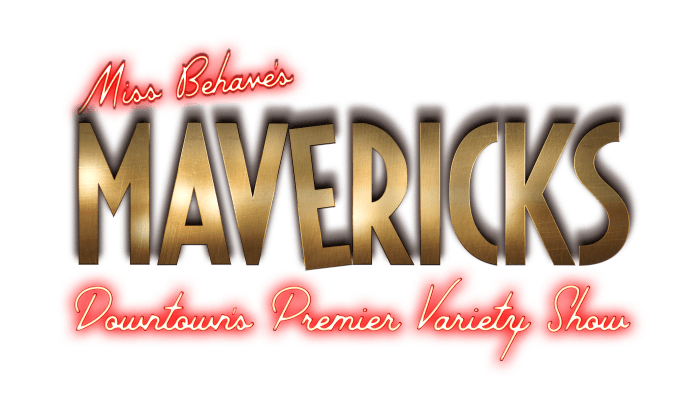
- Miss Behave's Mavericks logo
- Genre: Variety show
- Show type: Resident
- Date of premiere: October 2, 2024
- Final show: July 6, 2025
- Location: Plaza Hotel & Casino, Downtown Las Vegas, Nevada, U.S.

Creative team
- Creator: Amy Saunders
- Official website

Miss Behave's Mavericks, commonly shortened to Mavericks, is a Las Vegas variety show performed at the Plaza Hotel & Casino in Downtown Las Vegas. The show presents acrobatics, burlesque, comedy, contortionism, circus performances, juggling, and music. Amy Saunders, who goes by the stage name Miss Behave, created the show and is its emcee.

Saunders produced an earlier version of the show in 2020 at the Bread & Circus festival in Christchurch, New Zealand. After she moved to Las Vegas in 2017, she worked with the company Corner Bar Management to put on Mavericks at the nightclub Cheapshot in the Fremont East Entertainment District. Mavericks ran in the 99-seat theater from April 2022 to November 2022. Saunders relaunched the show at a 420-seat theater at the Plaza in Downtown Las Vegas on October 2, 2024. Mavericks went on break after the July 6, 2025, performance owing to insufficient funding though said it planned to resume shows in the middle of September. The show largely received positive reviews from critics.

== History ==
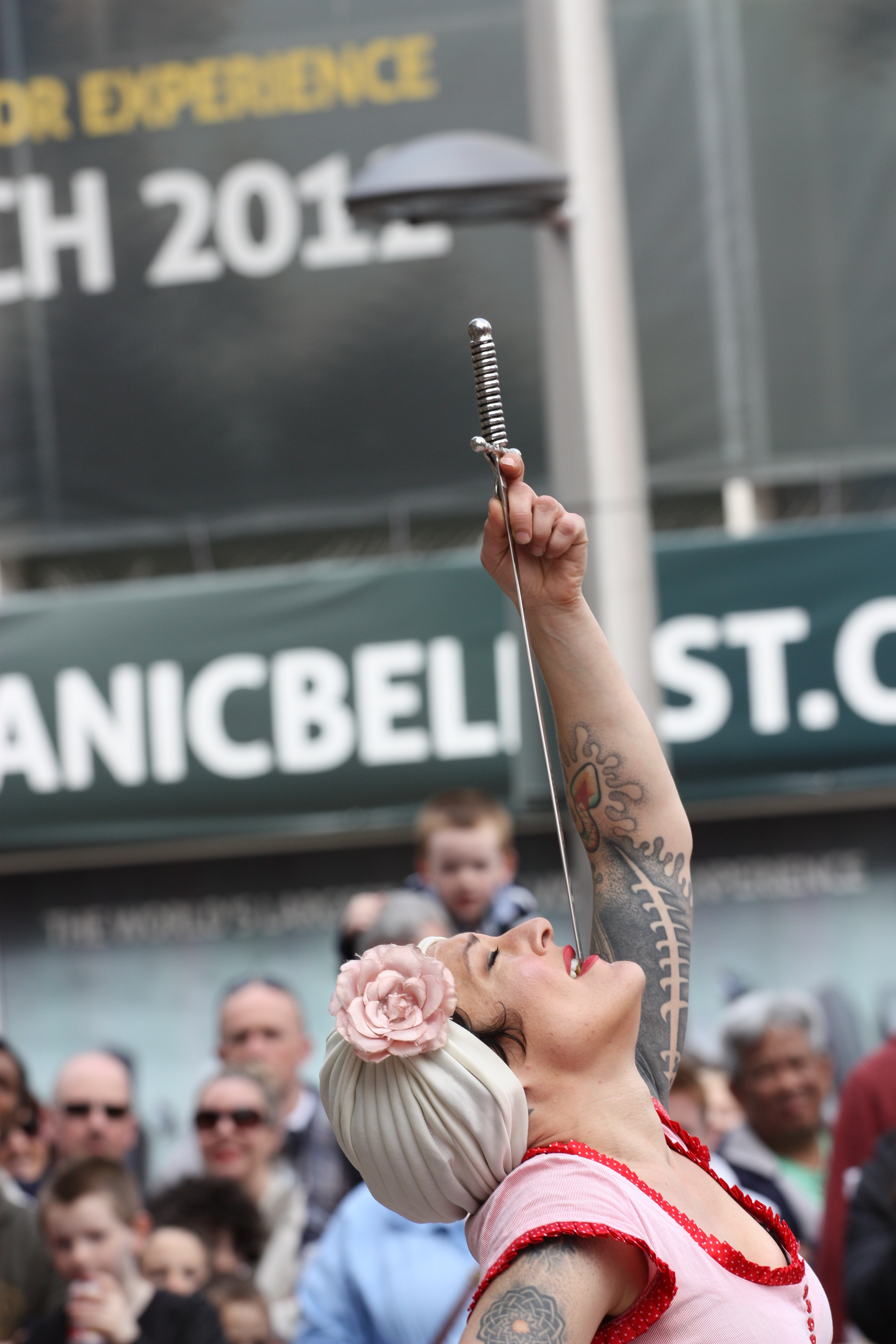
Amy Saunders, whose stage name is Miss Behave, sword swallowing in Belfast in 2013

Amy Saunders, whose stage name is Miss Behave, is the creator of Mavericks. In 2017, she moved to Las Vegas. Saunders originated and was the lead performer for Miss Behave Game Show, an audience-participation-driven, unscripted game show containing mature content. It debuted in December 2016 and closed after the first week of March 2020 at the beginning of the COVID-19 pandemic in Nevada, having been performed at the casino hotel Bally's on the Las Vegas Strip. Saunders began focusing on Downtown Las Vegas once the production ended. She collaborated with the company Corner Bar Management, which is run by Ryan Doherty, to put on the variety show Mavericks. She met with Doherty after he had recently purchased a performance venue and suggested that she oversee the entertainment. Saunders previously had put on a variety show named Mavericks at the festival Bread & Circus in Christchurch, New Zealand, in 2020 in which she was the emcee. For the one-hour show, she primarily shared the stage with the Daredevil Chicken Club, a duo consisting of Jonathan Taylor and Anne Goldmann who performed a comedic set involving a banana and several other sets. Saunders included several street performers in the show. The Press entertainment writer Charlie Gates found Mavericks to be "a refreshing and chaotic delight thanks to its deliberate lack of polish and inclusive, variety show feel".

Saunders said she was inspired by the musicians Louis Prima and Keely Smith, who had performed in lounges in Las Vegas. Her goal was to create a show that provides viewers with "fast-moving, uncomplicated entertainment". Mavericks debuted on April 1, 2022, at the Cheapshots Showroom & Discotheque at the nightclub Cheapshot, which occupied the Fremont East Entertainment District venue that used to house the piano bar Don't Tell Mama. The theater accommodates 99 people. When it opened at the Cheapshot, the performance was held once daily at night from Thursday to Saturday. Mavericks added a second showing on Saturdays in August 2022. The show made its last performance at Cheapshot on November 26, 2022. After the show closed, Saunders transitioned into a freelance arrangement with the nightclub.

After a hiatus since 2022, Mavericks debuted at the Plaza Showroom at the Plaza Hotel & Casino on October 2, 2024. The Plaza rented the venue to the show. The theater seats 420 people. Geoff Carter of the Las Vegas Weekly praised the move from Cheapshot to The Plaza. He found that at the Cheapshot in 2022, the show had a New York ambiance in being a cramped space with a bar-like atmosphere. He said that the move to the larger venue at The Plaza allows for an extravaganza that previously was out of reach. According to Carter, The Plaza theater still allows the entertainers to engage the audience in a way that brings "giddy fun" to the more cramped version of the show.

When Mavericks debuted, it was performed at night from Wednesday to Sunday. The show was performed twice on Saturdays and once on the other days. It is produced by Saunders, Matt Franzetti (who worked for Spiegelworld and Base Entertainment), Scott Prisand (who worked for Criss Angel), Michael Speyer (who worked for Absinthe and Peepshow), and Rob Kolson (who owns Apollo Theater Chicago and is a Broadway producer). While wearing a white jumpsuit and turban Saunders marketed the show during appearances for having relatively cheap ticket costs and offering vouchers to cover the cost of parking. Mavericks reached the 100-show mark in February 2025. Owing to lack of funding, Mavericks began taking a break after the performance on July 6, 2025. It said it planned to resume shows in the middle of September.

== Show ==
The variety show is 90 minutes long and features a rotating group of acts. Audience members are required to be at least 21 years old. In a nod to how the acts change every night, Saunders tells the audience, "If you like what you're seeing up here, tell your face." The show features a mix of circus performances, acrobatics, juggling, contortionism, music, burlesque, and comedy. The first performer is chosen to be "high-energy, happy, high-skill circus" like a juggler. To build a connection with the audience, before the show starts, Saunders greets viewers and helps them find their seats. In addition to doing balancing and sword swallowing, she acts as the emcee who introduces the acts and provides rapid-fire humor. Other entertainers include a contortionist drag queen, a performer hula hooping while dressed as a chicken, comedians dressed as police offers who love eating donuts, and an unpredictable ballet dancer.

At the Plaza Showroom, Mavericks hosted seven or eight performers delivering between 12 and 14 routines. The show is divided into two parts, each 45 minutes long with an intermission in between. Several performers from the show's Cheapshot edition reprised their acts in the Plaza version. The show urges audience members to arrive with one-dollar bills, ball them up, and toss them at entertainers they find particularly entertaining.

== Performers ==
- The dancer Alexandria Beauregard performed on the show in 2024. She is splashed in water in a scene reminiscent of a moment from the film Flashdance featuring Jennifer Beals.
- The drag queen Scarlett Business performed in the show in 2024. Scarlett Business did a sultry handstand while completely in drag.
- The marching band from Green Valley High School performed during the show's media premiere in 2024. As they entered the theater, the band performed the Bruce Channel song "Hey! Baby". Later, they accompanied the Elvis impersonator Matt Lewis while he delivered a rendition of "If I Can Dream".
- The comedian Murray Hill performed at the show in 2025. Clad in a black tuxedo paired with a cherry-red shirt, he tap danced and made jokes such as saying that many in the audience had received complimentary tickets to fill up seats at the venue. Hill delivered a routine filled with Borscht Belt humor. Accompanied by the band, Jordan Katz & The Stiff Gimlets, he delivered several vocal numbers.
- The magician Mac King performed sleight of hand at the show in 2022.
- The burlesque performer Michelle L'amour appeared in the show. In her "Butthoven's 5th Symphony" routine set to "Symphony No. 5", L'amour flexes her butt.
- The dancer Tanya Gagne performed on the show in 2024. Dressed as a chicken, she did the hula hoop.
- The dancer Julie Atlas Muz performed burlesque on the show in 2024. In one scene, delivered a sensual routine including a disembodied hand as a prop in which the hand seems to assault her. In another scene, Muz took the stage as Officer Donut in a routine that Las Vegas Magazine's Em Jurbala described as "so funny, yet so sexy, it ought to be criminal".
- The contortionist TJ Santiago performed on the show in 2024 and as part of his act included striptease.
- The dancer Bella Schleiker performed ballet on the show in 2024. Ken Miller of Las Vegas Magazine praised both her dancing and her "hilarious facial expressions". One of her acts involved a swan dance that Las Vegas Magazine's Em Jurbala found to be "hilariously uncomfortable".
- The juggler Christopher Stoinev performed on the show in 2024.
- The singer Melody Sweets performed at the show in 2025. Sweets, who previously had performed as the Green Fairy in Absinthe, sang the Peggy Lee song "I Love Being Here with You" on the show in 2025. Clad in her trademark pink dress and a heart-shaped cape, she drew from her top a red heart made of silk. Las Vegas Review-Journal columnist John Katsilometes said her nostalgic routine earned chuckles and applause from the audience.
- The singer William Trice, who uses the stage name Trice Be Phantom Magnetiq, was part of the cast in 2022. Wearing regal robes, he performs the James Brown song "It's a Man's Man's Man's World", a Luciano Pavarotti piece, a reggae song, and the Marvin Gaye song "What's Going On".

== Reception ==
Geoff Carter of the Las Vegas Weekly said in 2022 that show is "intimate, old-school and perhaps even slightly dangerous". Carter praised the show in 2024 for being a "funny, raunchy, eye-popping variety spectacular" and lauded the show's likelihood of delivering "fresh surprises" in each show. Las Vegas Sun entertainment critic Brock Radke said that since East Fremont's nightlife spots largely play DJ tunes, the production's spur-of-the-moment parts position it as a valued downtown spot that enhances the live entertainment landscape. In its "2022 Best of Vegas" rankings, the Las Vegas Weekly rated Cheapshot as the "Best Cabaret", citing its show Mavericks as "the sexy, eccentric and riotously funny $25 variety show that's a must-see for locals and tourists alike". In its "2025 Best of Vegas – Readers' Choice" awards, the newspaper named Mavericks as the "Best Production Show", praising its "classic Vegas showroom vibe".

Calling Mavericks "a very cool throwback variety production", Las Vegas Review-Journal columnist John Katsilometes viewed the show as a joyful mix of niche entertainers. He found them to be "wildly gifted, passionate performers" and likened them to acts at the Edinburgh Festival Fringe, a county fair, or a traveling circus. Maria Dibut Galera of KLAS-TV thought that although the show has a touch of retro Las Vegas vibe, younger audiences still resonate with it.

Las Vegas Magazine's Em Jurbala penned a positive review of the show, finding it to be "boundary-testing", "edgy", and "unpredictable". She praised Amy Saunders for being a great emcee who ensures the show flows smoothly with "the kind of wit and charm only a cabaret star with a lifetime in entertainment could muster". According to Jurbala, viewers will be "amused and bemused" and regardless of the lineup on the stage, the enduring factor is the exceptional skill of the performers. USA Today's 10Best awarded the show 10th place in the "Best Las Vegas Show" category in 2025, calling it "equal parts naughty and nice", bringing "flirty and fun" recreation to downtown Las Vegas.
