= The Western =

Casino hotel in Nevada, United States

Coordinates: 36°10′0.5″N 115°8′12.4″W

Western Hotel and Casino
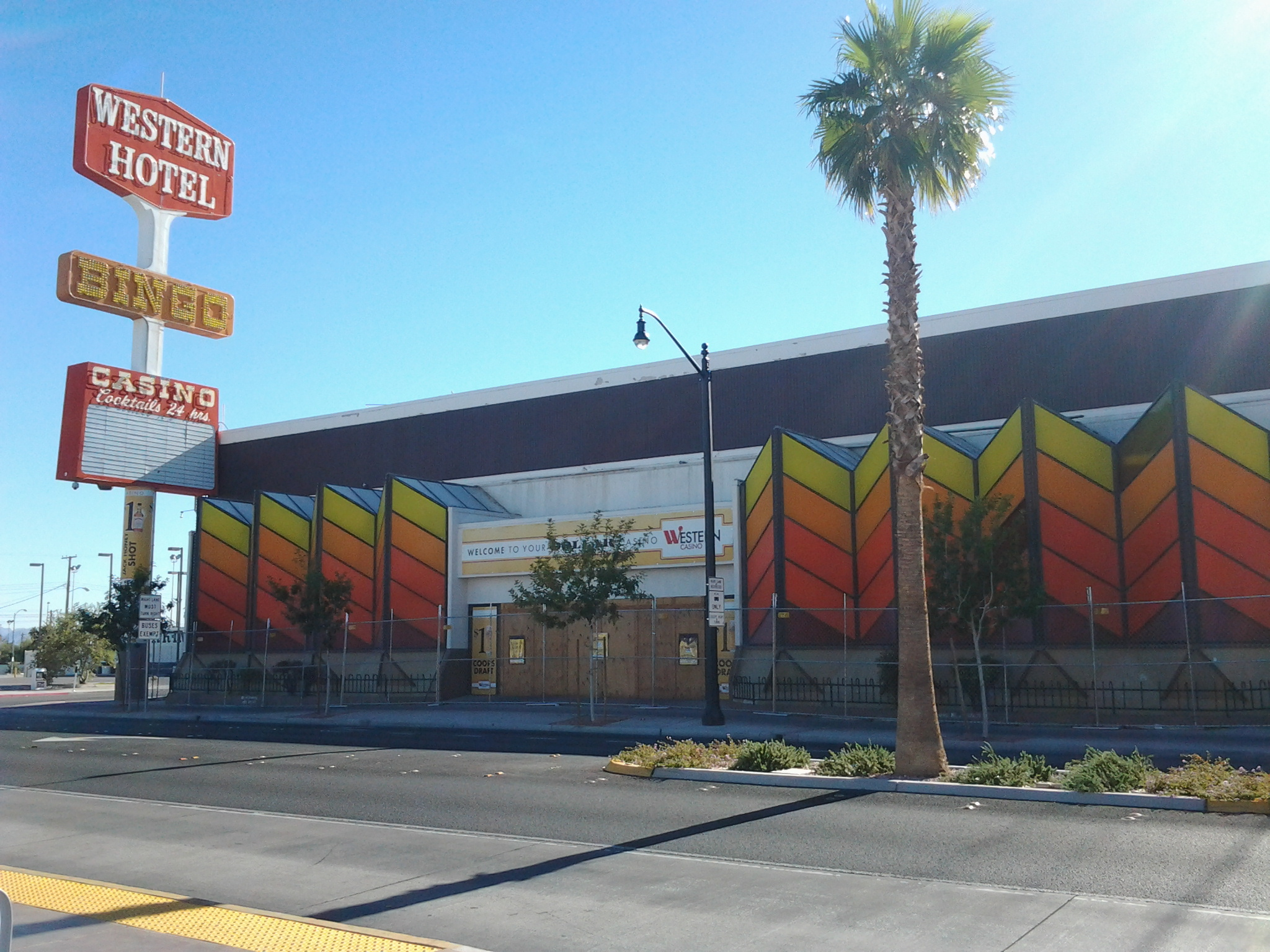

- Location within Downtown Las Vegas Location within Nevada
- Interactive map of Western Hotel and Casino
- Location: Las Vegas, NV 89101; 899 Fremont Street
- Opened: 1970
- Closed: January 16, 2012
- Theme: Western
- No. of rooms: 116
- Gaming space: 8,925 sq ft (829.2 m^{2})
- Casino type: Land-Based
- Owner: Barrick Gaming
- Previous names: Western Hotel & Bingo Parlor

The Western Hotel and Casino was a hotel and casino in downtown Las Vegas, Nevada. The 8,925 sq ft (829.2 m^{2}) casino was owned and operated by the Barrick Gaming.

The Western was the lowest rung of Jackie Gaughan's low-roller casino empire that included the Las Vegas Club, The Plaza, the Gold Spike and El Cortez.

== History ==
The Western opened in 1970 as the Western Hotel & Bingo Parlor and was owned by Jackie Gaughan and Mel Exber. At its opening, The Western was the world's largest bingo parlor, with 1,020 seats.

Jackie Gaughan sold the hotel to Barrick Gaming in March 2004. The plans called for redeveloping the Western Hotel as a Latino destination resort. At the time, the AP said about the property, "On a stretch of despair that tourists in Las Vegas seldom see, the Western Hotel-Casino stands out as a beacon for the broke and nearly broken".

In 2005, the Tamares Group acquired total control of the hotel and casino through a lease from Barrick. In 2010, the hotel portion completely closed, and redevelopment remains uncertain.

On November 15, 2011, the Tamares Group announced that "due to decreased demand at this location", The Western would close on January 16, 2012. Its future redevelopment is uncertain.

In March 2013, the property was purchased for $14 million by a company affiliated with Tony Hsieh's Downtown Project, a campaign to revitalize the Fremont Street area.

The hotel portion was demolished in 2013, while the casino portion remains standing.
