= 1500 Broadway =

Office building in Manhattan, New York

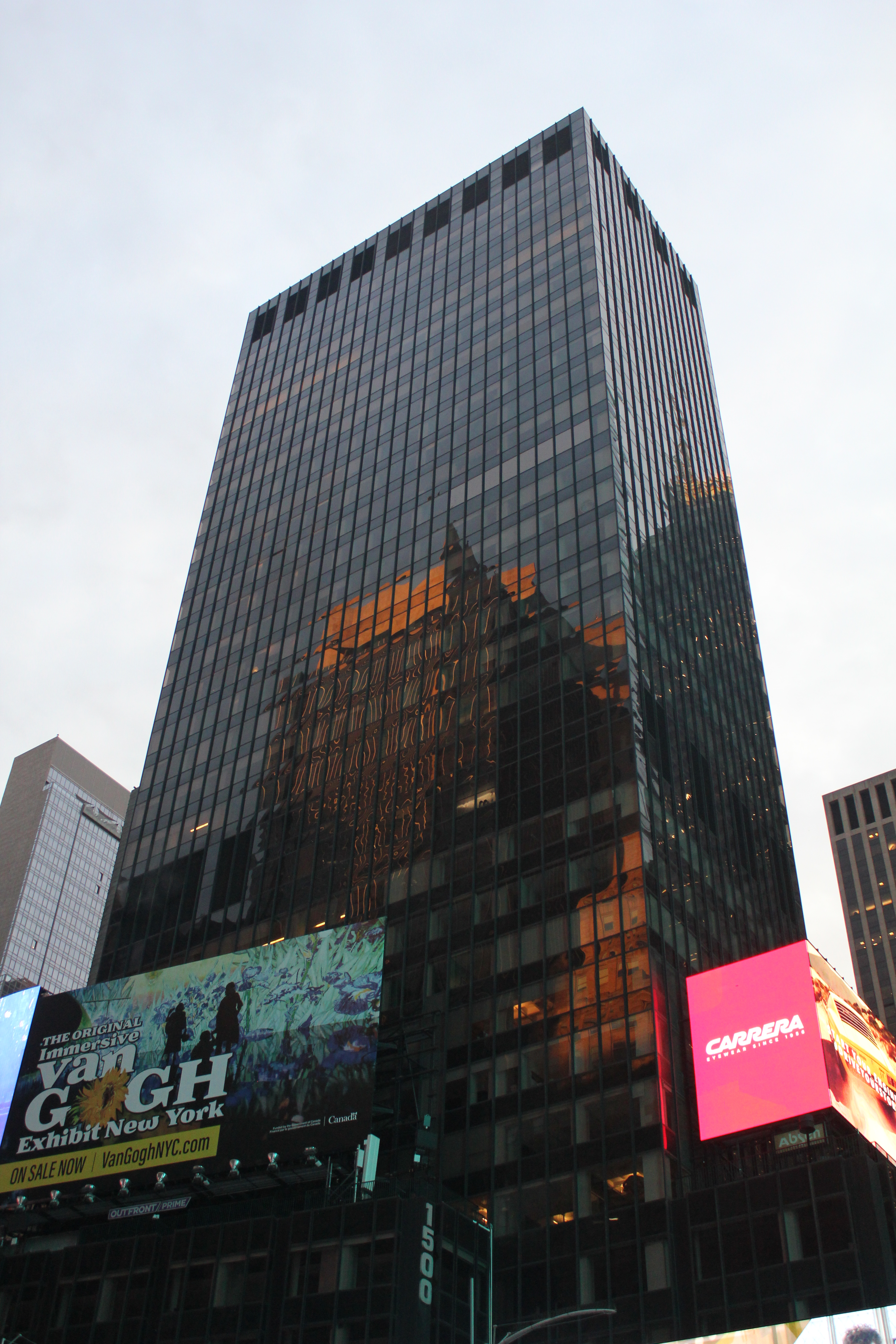
- 1500 Broadway in November 2021

General information
- Status: Completed
- Type: Skyscraper
- Architectural style: Modernism
- Location: 1500 Broadway; Manhattan, New York, U.S.
- Coordinates: 40°45′24″N 73°59′08″W
- Completed: 1972
- Owner: Tamares Group

Height
- Roof: 392 ft (119 m)
- Top floor: 33

Technical details
- Floor area: 500,000 square feet (46,000 m^{2})
- Lifts/elevators: 5

Design and construction
- Architect: Leo Kornblath
- Developer: Arlen Realty and Development Corporation
- Structural engineer: Rosenwasser / Grossman Consulting Engineers, P.C.

1500 Broadway (also known as Times Square Plaza) is an office building on Times Square in Midtown Manhattan, New York City, New York. Completed in 1972 by Arlen Realty & Development Corporation, the 33-story building is 392 feet (119 meters) tall. The building replaced the Hotel Claridge and occupies an entire block front on the east side of Broadway between 43rd Street and 44th Street.

The facade is made of bronze aluminum and contains tinted-glass windows. The lowest four stories of the facade were renovated in the late 1980s, and there is also a pair of curving news tickers and a billboard at the lower part of the building's facade. The building contains about 460,000 square feet (43,000 m^{2}) of space. At ground level, there was originally an arcade, lobby, two foyers, and a movie theater; in addition, Times Square Studios and ABC Studios occupy space on the lower stories.

The New York City Board of Estimate approved a zoning regulation encouraging the construction of theaters in new office buildings near Times Square. Subsequently, National General Pictures announced plans in January 1970 for a skyscraper with movie theaters, and Arlen Realty was hired as the building's developer. The building's cinema opened December 12, 1972, and the first office leases were signed in March 1974. The structure was almost completely vacant when it opened, and it did not approach full occupancy until the mid-1980s. The structure was sold in 1988 to the 1500 Realty Company, and it was resold in 1995 to a partnership that included Tamares Group.

== Site ==
1500 Broadway is on the eastern side of Times Square, between 43rd and 44th Streets in the Midtown Manhattan neighborhood of New York City, New York, U.S. While the building carries a Broadway address, it is actually on the east side of Seventh Avenue. The section of Broadway and Seventh Avenue between 43rd and 45th Streets is officially listed on city maps as "Times Square", (Note: As the two roads intersect at a very shallow angle, they are nearly parallel through Times Square. Broadway is west of Seventh Avenue to the north of 45th Street and east of Seventh Avenue to the south of 44th Street. Because Broadway between 42nd and 47th Streets was closed in the 2010s, 1500 Broadway only faces Seventh Avenue.) but the adjoining section of Broadway was converted into a permanent pedestrian plaza in the 2010s. 1500 Broadway's rectangular land lot is bounded by Times Square to the west, 44th Street to the north, and 43rd Street to the south. The lot spans 25,569 square feet (2,375.4 m^{2}), with a frontage of 203.77 feet (62.11 m) on Broadway and a depth of 125 feet (38 m).

The surrounding area is part of Manhattan's Theater District and contains many Broadway theatres. 1500 Broadway shares the block with the Lambs Club Building and the Town Hall performing-arts center to the east. The Bow Tie Building, Millennium Times Square New York hotel, the Hudson Theatre, the aka Times Square, and the Belasco Theatre are across 44th Street to the north, and 4 Times Square, the Bank of America Tower, and the Stephen Sondheim Theatre are across 43rd Street to the south. The building is also near One Times Square and 3 Times Square to the southwest, 1501 Broadway to the west, and One Astor Plaza to the northwest.

Prior to the development of the current 1500 Broadway, the southeast corner of Broadway and 44th Street was occupied by the Hotel Claridge, built in 1910 as the Rector Hotel. From 1941 to 1966, that building had contained a billboard advertising Camel cigarettes, which emitted steam jets. The northeast corner of Broadway and 43rd Street contained a two-story commercial structure at 1500–1504 Broadway, owned by the family of George Innes-Ker, 9th Duke of Roxburghe, from 1920 to 1963. The two-story structure, a shoe shop, itself replaced the Barrett House hotel, where playwright Eugene O'Neill was born.

== Architecture ==
The structure was built as a joint venture between Arlen Realty and Development Corporation and National General Corporation. It was designed by the firm of Leo Kornblath & Associates and is 33 stories high. (Note: Other sources cited the building as being 32, 34, or 35 stories high.) The building contains 460,000 square feet (43,000 m^{2}) of space, of which 360,000 square feet (33,000 m^{2}) was rentable space.

=== Facade ===
The facade is made of bronze aluminum and contains tinted-glass windows. At ground level, there was originally an arcade with shops and a marquee on the Broadway side. The lobby, and two foyers for a movie theater on the second and third stories, were visible behind the marquee. The marquee measured 72 feet (22 m) long and 9 feet (2.7 m) high. The Artkraft-Strauss Corporation designed a series of vertical light tubes on the facade, which stretched from a third-floor chandelier outside the building, spanning the length of the marquee, to another third-floor chandelier. According to the movie theater's architect Drew Eberson, (Note: Eberson was the son of prolific movie palace designer John Eberson.) this was intended to give the impression that the theater was "opening its arms to Broadway".

The lowest four stories of the facade were renovated in the late 1980s, when Clark Tribble Harris & Li designed a new entrance on 43rd Street with a portico made of stainless steel and black granite. When the Walt Disney Company built the Times Square Studios within the lowest part of the building in the late 1990s, a curving, 4,000-square-foot (370 m^{2}) screen was placed on the northwest corner of the building. The facade also features a pair of curving news tickers, as well as a 585-square-foot (54.3 m^{2}) screen overlooking Broadway and Seventh Avenue. Unlike other buildings on Times Square, the building did not contain any digital advertisements until 1997, when the owners installed a 40-by-40-foot (12 by 12 m) advertising screen above the seventh-story setback. Another screen, measuring 52 by 31.5 feet (15.8 by 9.6 m), was installed in 2001 and originally advertised the Wrigley Company.

=== Features ===
When 1500 Broadway was built, the base contained a movie theater designed by Drew Eberson. The structure was originally supposed to contain two screens, with 1,000 and 1,500 seats. The larger screen would have been stacked above the smaller one, and both auditoriums would have been decorated with white marble, bronze, and wood. As constructed, the building contained a single-screen cinema with 1,445 seats. Patrons entered a 14-foot-tall (4.3 m) lobby with marble walls, where a pair of escalators led to the cinema. The auditorium itself was clad in vinyl with teak doors. Each seat was made of fiberglass and upholstered in orange; the bottoms of the seats were painted white so people could easily determine whether a seat was occupied. There was an orchestra level with 932 seats and a mezzanine with 513 seats. The curtain was decorated in olive, burnt orange, and copper colors, which harmonized with the auditorium's general color scheme.

The lobby was originally shaped like an "L". When the lobby was renovated in the late 1980s, it was converted into a rotunda with curved walls, two ornamental columns, and a ceiling measuring 25 feet (7.6 m) high. The walls and floor were clad in white marble accented with red, gray, and black granite. This project involved removing some of the storefronts.

1500 Broadway hosts Times Square Studios and ABC Studios. The studios were designed by Walt Disney Imagineering and its senior vice president of concept design Eddie Sotto, who stated that the design of the building symbolized a "looking glass" and the idea of "media as architecture". During the studios' construction, the lowest five stories were gutted, and concrete columns at the center of the building were replaced with steel trusses along the perimeter. The ground floor includes a studio with three removable glass panels. Covering 2,400 square feet (220 m^{2}), the ground-level studio was originally designed to resemble a New York City Subway station. On the second floor is the 4,600-square-foot (430 m^{2}) Marquee Studio, which overlooks the corner of Broadway and 44th Street and is cantilevered over the ground-level studio. The studio overhangs the sidewalk on Broadway by up to 18 feet (5.5 m).

== History ==
After World War II, development of theaters around Times Square stalled, and the area began to evolve into a business district. By the 1960s, city officials were encouraging the westward expansion of office towers in Manhattan, and there were few efforts to preserve existing theaters. This changed in 1967, when the New York City Board of Estimate approved a zoning regulation encouraging the construction of theaters in new office buildings near Times Square. The legislation allowed developers to increase the maximum amount of office space in their buildings if they erected a theater at their base.

=== Development and early years ===
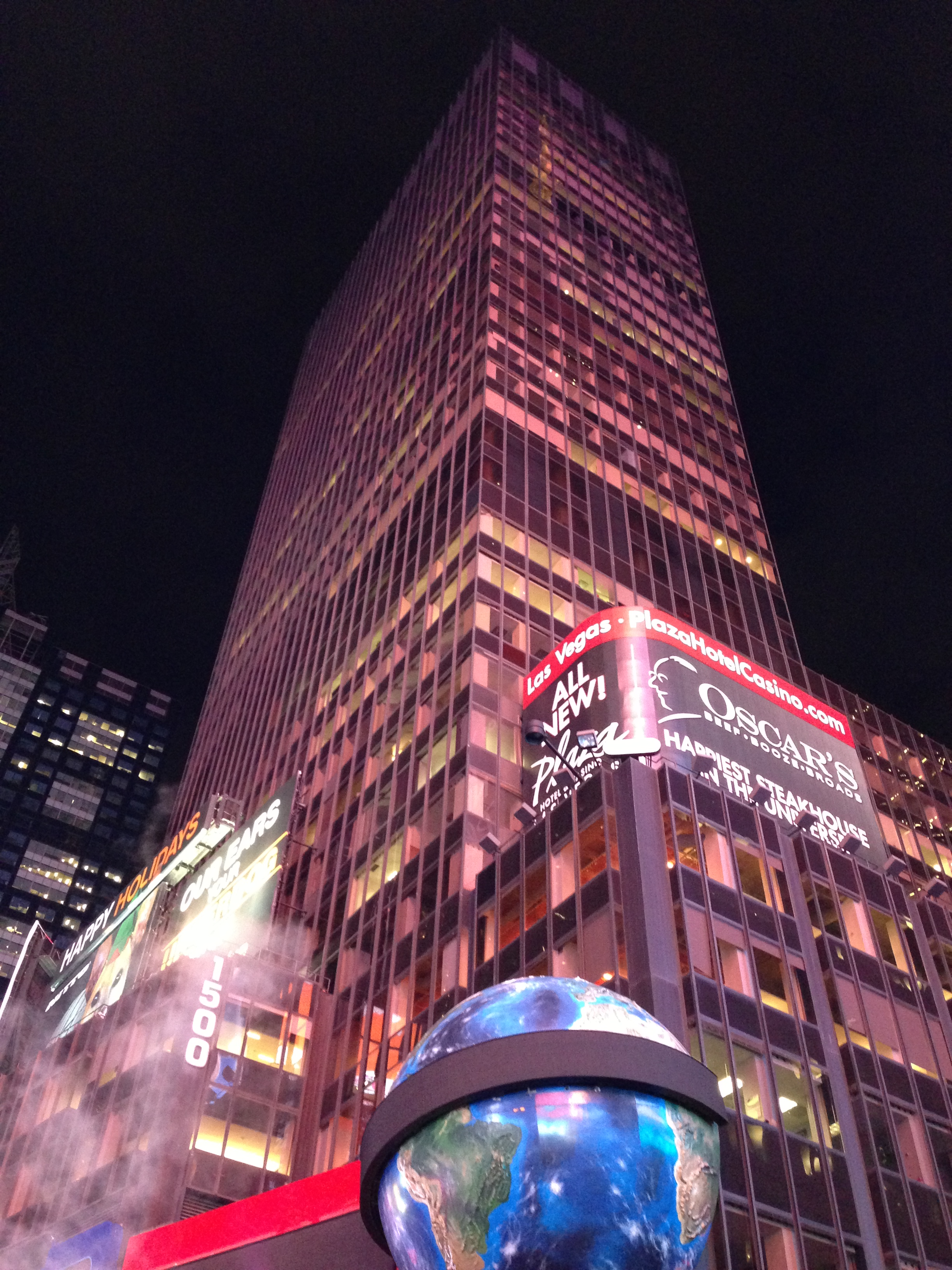
Viewed at night

National General Pictures announced in January 1970 that it had signed a lease for a 32-story skyscraper with two movie theaters, which was to be built on the site of the Claridge Hotel. Arlen Realty was to be the building's developer. National General would be the flagship tenant, which was to be known as the NGC Realty Building or the National General Building. When 1500 Broadway was announced, it was one of six office buildings being planned for the immediate neighborhood, and demand for office space in Manhattan had already begun to wane. The National General Building was also one of several new buildings near Times Square with theaters, along with One Astor Plaza and the Uris Building, although these structures contained Broadway theaters rather than cinemas. During the building's construction, Arlen Realty hired artists Nassos Daphnis and Tania to paint a 16-story-tall street art mural on the building's steel frame. The street art was covered by the building's facade as construction progressed.

The building's cinema opened December 12, 1972, with the premiere of The Poseidon Adventure. It was the first new movie theater to be built on Times Square in 37 years, following the Criterion Theatre in 1935. National General had dropped out of the project by the time the building was completed. In part due to the large oversupply of office space in Manhattan, only 10 to 15 percent of the building was occupied in its first year; the structure was almost completely vacant except for its retail space and movie theater. The first office leases were not signed until March 1974, when women's clothing store Lane Bryant and document-management corporation Xerox collectively leased 30,500 square feet (2,830 m^{2}). Other early tenants included the American Federation of Musicians (which leased three floors) the Actors' Equity Association, and the Junior League. One-third of the building had been leased by early 1975.

Years after the building opened, it continued to struggle with low occupancy rates. By 1975, the building's space was only being rented for $6 to $7 per square foot ($65 to $75/m^{2}), well below the $11 per square foot ($120/m^{2}) that experts said was necessary for the building to break even. A Chase Bank branch in the building had closed in 1976 after just two years of operation. Newsweek wrote in 1977 that the building remained half empty, even though the office space was still relatively new. In 1979, as part of an ongoing redevelopment of Times Square, architect Frederick DeMatteis proposed creating a three-story "deck" surrounding 1500 Broadway and several other nearby buildings; the deck would have supported numerous skyscrapers. A second screen was added at the National Theater in 1982. The building did not reach near-full occupancy until the mid-1980s, when space was being rented out for $18 to $24 per square foot ($190 to $260/m^{2}). During the 1980s, Garth Drabinsky of Cineplex Odeon Corporation took over the National Theater and renovated its two screens.

=== Sales and renovations ===
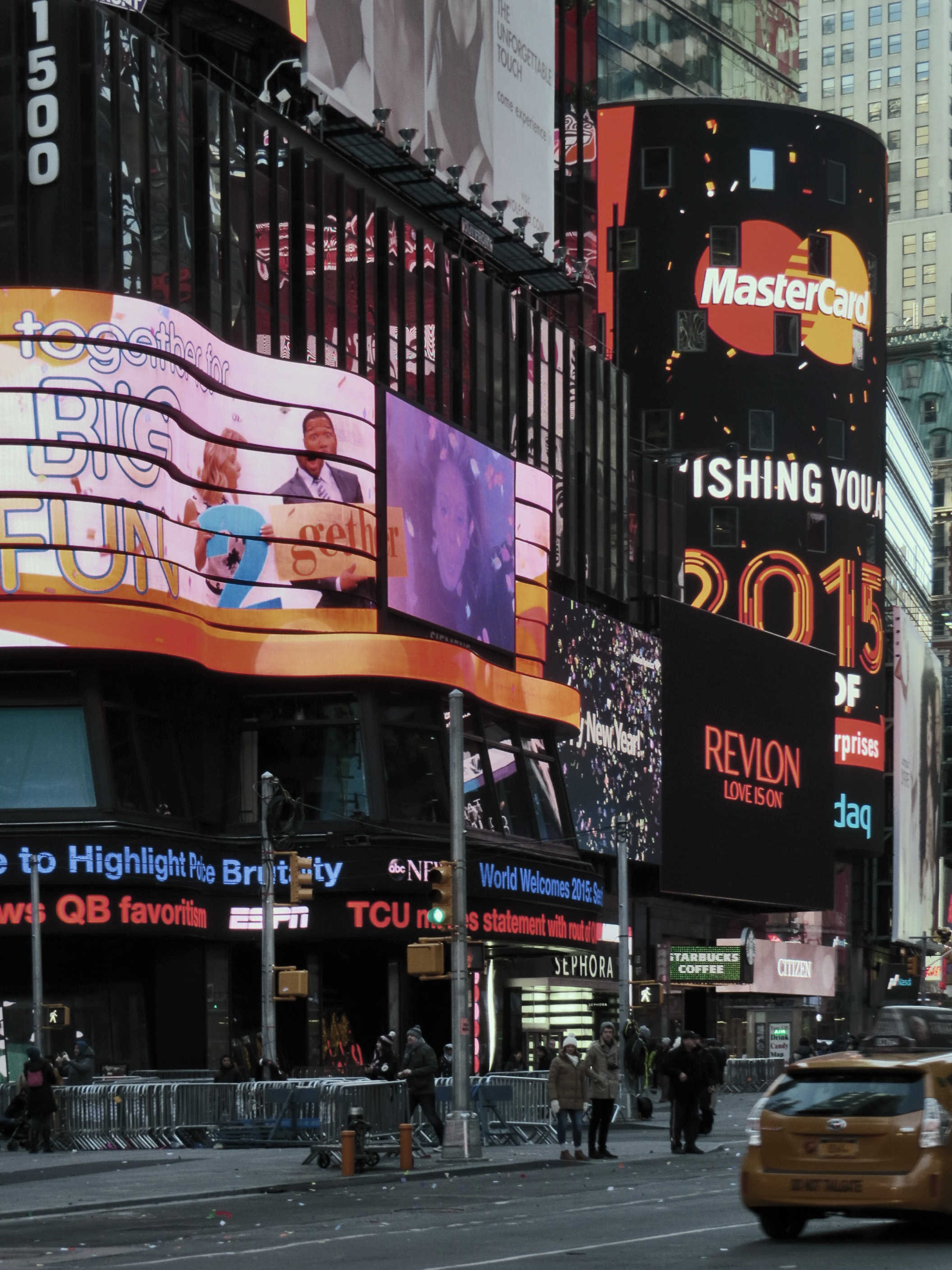
The base

The structure was sold in 1988 for about $88 million, or approximately $200 per square foot ($2,200/m^{2}). The new owners, known as the 1500 Realty Company, had wanted to buy the building because it had windows on all sides, the offices did not require asbestos abatement, and the neighborhood was improving. However, the structure had 200,000 square feet (19,000 m^{2}) of vacant space; brokers said potential tenants were dissuaded by the lack of security, poor maintenance, and rundown lobby. This prompted the owners to renovate the lower section of the building's facade and enlarge the lobby. The renovation attracted six tenants who collectively leased 130,000 square feet (12,000 m^{2}). The building's owners went bankrupt in the 1990s. 1500 Broadway was 96 percent occupied by 1994, when a $75 million mortgage loan on the building was sold.

The building was sold in September 1995 to a partnership who paid Crossland Savings Bank $55 million. The building's stakeholders included the Tamares Group, Intertech, Charles Bendit, and Essex Capital Partners. Rushbury Limited, an investment trust, bought a 6.25 percent ownership stake in 1996. At the time, the ground level included electronics stores and souvenir shops. After the building was sold, Intertech announced plans to renovate 1500 Broadway's mechanical systems and public spaces for $6 million. Most of the tenants' retail leases were set to expire over the next several years, and these tenants gradually moved out. Intertech's executive vice president said, "One of the reasons we bought 1500 Broadway in 1995 was its potential for signage", as the building had never contained any advertisements. As such, Intertech announced plans in early 1997 to install an advertising screen, the first such screen to be installed on the building in its history. To attract potential tenants, Bendit's firm Taconic Investment Partners replaced the building's wiring.

Although clothing chain Old Navy had been negotiating to lease the building's ground level, the American Broadcasting Company (ABC) leased the lower floors of 1500 Broadway in late 1997, with plans to add television studios and an ESPN Grill there. ABC agreed to lease the space after two executives of ABC's parent company, the Walt Disney Company, had stood on the old National Theater's marquee while looking for sites for its studios. ABC was one of several major companies to lease large amounts of space in Times Square during that time, and rent rates at the building increased significantly in the following year. The National Theater was closed to make way for the studios, and the lowest five stories were gutted and rebuilt starting in mid-1998. The renovation involved installing 300 short tons (270 long tons; 270 t) of steel. Good Morning America started broadcasting from the studios in 1999, following the renovation, which cost about $1,000 per square foot ($11,000/m^{2}). Bendit sold his stake in the building the same year.

=== Late 1990s to present ===
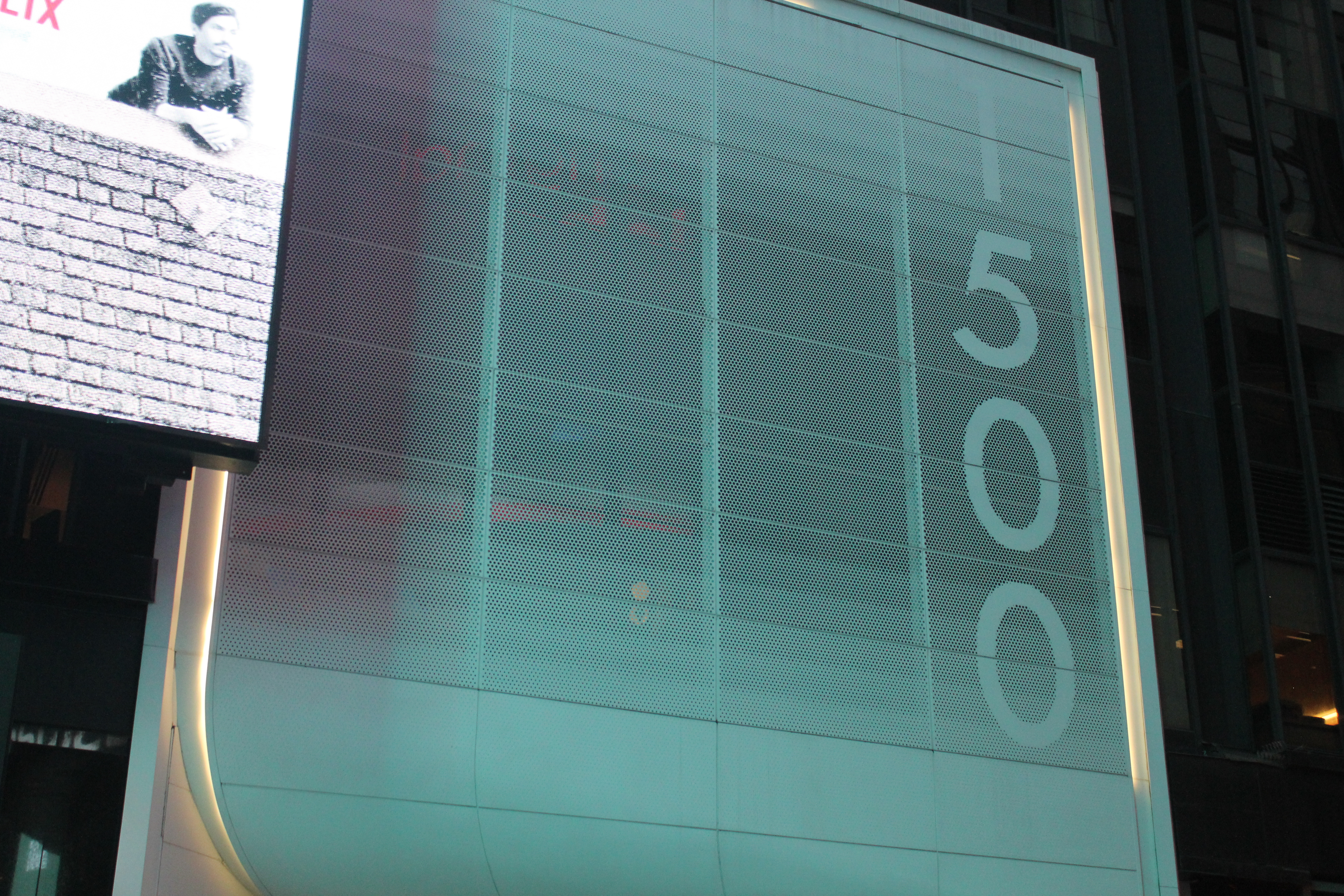
Entrance on 43rd Street

The building had about 65 tenants at the end of the 1990s. According to The New York Times, the building's occupants included "lawyers, accountants, salesmen, public relations people, and the staffs of two magazines", namely Essence and Latina; its largest tenant was public-relations firm Edelman, which employed 300 people at the building. 1500 Broadway was also known as Times Square Plaza by 2000. Another billboard, promoting the Wrigley Company, was installed on 1500 Broadway in mid-2001. Major tenants during the 2000s included stock exchange NASDAQ, which leased 60,000 ft^{2} (5,600 m^{2}) immediately after the September 11 attacks; although NASDAQ quickly moved out, the exchange continued to sublease the space for 20 years. In addition, Edelman continued to occupy a large part of the building until 2009.

By the early 2010s, the building's tenants included Chinese Communist Party–owned newspaper China Daily, in addition to 13 technology companies. The Tamares Group acquired Rushbury Ltd.'s ownership stake in 1500 Broadway for $12 million in 2014 before obtaining a $335 million mortgage loan for the building. This prompted Simon Murray of Rushbury Ltd. to sue the Tamares Group's director, Poju Zabludowicz, claiming that Zabludowicz had convinced Murray to sell his ownership stake because Zabludowicz did not want to share the cash from the mortgage loan. In late 2022, a Gordon Ramsay Fish & Chips restaurant opened in 1500 Broadway, along with a Carlo's Bakery. Tamashii Nations opened a toy and collectible store there the next year.

The building's $335 million loan was sent to special servicing in August 2024. Tamares wanted forbearance on the loan as well. At the time, 25% of the space was vacant, and the owner was struggling to find tenants for the vacant space; in addition, two major tenants' leases were scheduled to expire that year. Though Nasdaq chose not to renew its lease at the end of the month, the company continued to operate its signage on the building. After the loan went into default in late 2024, Tamares obtained a four-year loan extension in March 2025, giving the company more time to repay the loan. The same year, Good Morning America moved out of its 1500 Broadway studio, having announced its relocation in 2023.

== Critical reception ==
Paul Goldberger criticized the building as having brought "nothing more than Third Avenue banality to a part of town that, whatever its social problems, has always been visually spectacular." Robert A. M. Stern similarly described the building as a "banality", especially as contrasted with the Hotel Claridge. Just before the building's late-1990s renovation, a writer for Crain's New York described 1500 Broadway as "a plain black box with dowdy retail space".
