= Jackie Gaughan =

American casino owner and businessman (1920–2014)

- Born: October 24, 1920; Hastings, Nebraska, U.S.
- Died: March 12, 2014 (aged 93); Las Vegas, Nevada U.S.
- Education: Creighton University
- Known for: Casino owner
- Spouse: Roberta Mae Gaughan (m. 1942; died 1996)
- Children: John Davis "Jackie" Gaughan, Jr. (1947–2002); Michael Gaughan

John Davis Gaughan, Sr. (October 24, 1920 – March 12, 2014) was an American casino owner and operator from the early 1950s in Las Vegas, Nevada. He had an ownership stake in many casinos throughout his career, but he is best known for his ownership of the El Cortez, where he resided until his death on March 12, 2014. At one time Gaughan reportedly owned more than 25 percent of the available real estate in Downtown Las Vegas.

== Biography ==
Gaughan grew up in Omaha, Nebraska. He served in World War II and earned a degree from Creighton University. During his time in the military he served at Las Vegas Air Force Base (now Nellis AFB), giving him his first exposure to the city.

He began his career in the gambling industry in Omaha, working as a legal bookmaker at horse racing tracks around Omaha. He relocated to Las Vegas in 1950 after passage of a 10 percent tax on the legal bookmaking parlors crippled the industry in Nebraska. Upon arriving in Las Vegas, he bought a stake in the Flamingo. He quit his job at the hotel after mobster Davie Berman called him a "dime-a-dozen punk" for asking a favor of the maître d', although he retained three percent ownership of the property. Gaughan later bought a 3% stake in the Boulder Club.

He purchased the Las Vegas Club in 1961, opened The Western with business partner Mel Exber in 1970, and purchased what became the Gold Spike in 1983. He was a partner, alongside Sam Boyd and Howard Cannon, in the opening of the Union Plaza in 1971, which was renamed Jackie Gaughan's Plaza in the 1990s, and additionally invested in the Golden Nugget, the Royal Inn and the Showboat.

Gaughan bought the El Cortez from John Kell "J. Kell" Houssels, Sr. in 1963. Houssels had built the El Cortez and sold in 1945 to gangsters Bugsy Siegel, Meyer Lansky, Gus Greenbaum and Moe Sedway, only to buy it back later when Seigel and company needed to fund the Flamingo. Upon purchasing the hotel, Gaughan inherited the care of mobster Irish Green, who did right by Bugsy Siegel and got put up in the El Cortez for life. Although he was not entirely pleased with the arrangement, Gaughan looked out for the old mobster till the day he died.

Gaughan owned a stake in the Golden Nugget when Steve Wynn took over the downtown property in 1973. He mentored Steve Wynn as he learned the Vegas casino industry. While casino investment and development began to shift towards The Strip and off-Strip, Gaughan kept his capital invested in downtown. While other downtown casinos began to reduce costs and close, he kept his operations open and continued to invest capital in his properties. At his peak, Gaughan had accumulated more than 25 percent of available downtown real estate, including more than 20 acres of undeveloped land. In 2004, Gaughan sold the Plaza, Gold Spike, Vegas Club and Western, along with substantial pieces of additional downtown real estate, to Barrick Gaming for $82 million.

== Family ==
Gaughan and his wife, Roberta Mae (1921–1996), were married for 54 years, until her death in 1996. The couple had two sons, John and Michael. John F. "Jackie Jr." Gaughan (November 24, 1947 – November 10, 2002) had minor ownership interests in the El Cortez and The Gold Spike. He died in his sleep at age 54. Michael Gaughan took over many of the day-to-day operations of his father's casinos over the years. Michael Gaughan owns the South Point Hotel, Casino & Spa as well as the rights to operate the slot concession at Harry Reid International Airport. Gaughan's grandson, Brendan, is a NASCAR driver.

== Death ==
Gaughan died on March 12, 2014, in Las Vegas, Nevada, at the age of 93. His funeral Mass was held on March 17, 2014, at St. Viator Catholic Church, Paradise, Nevada.
