= Casino Fandango =

Hotel and casino in Nevada, United States

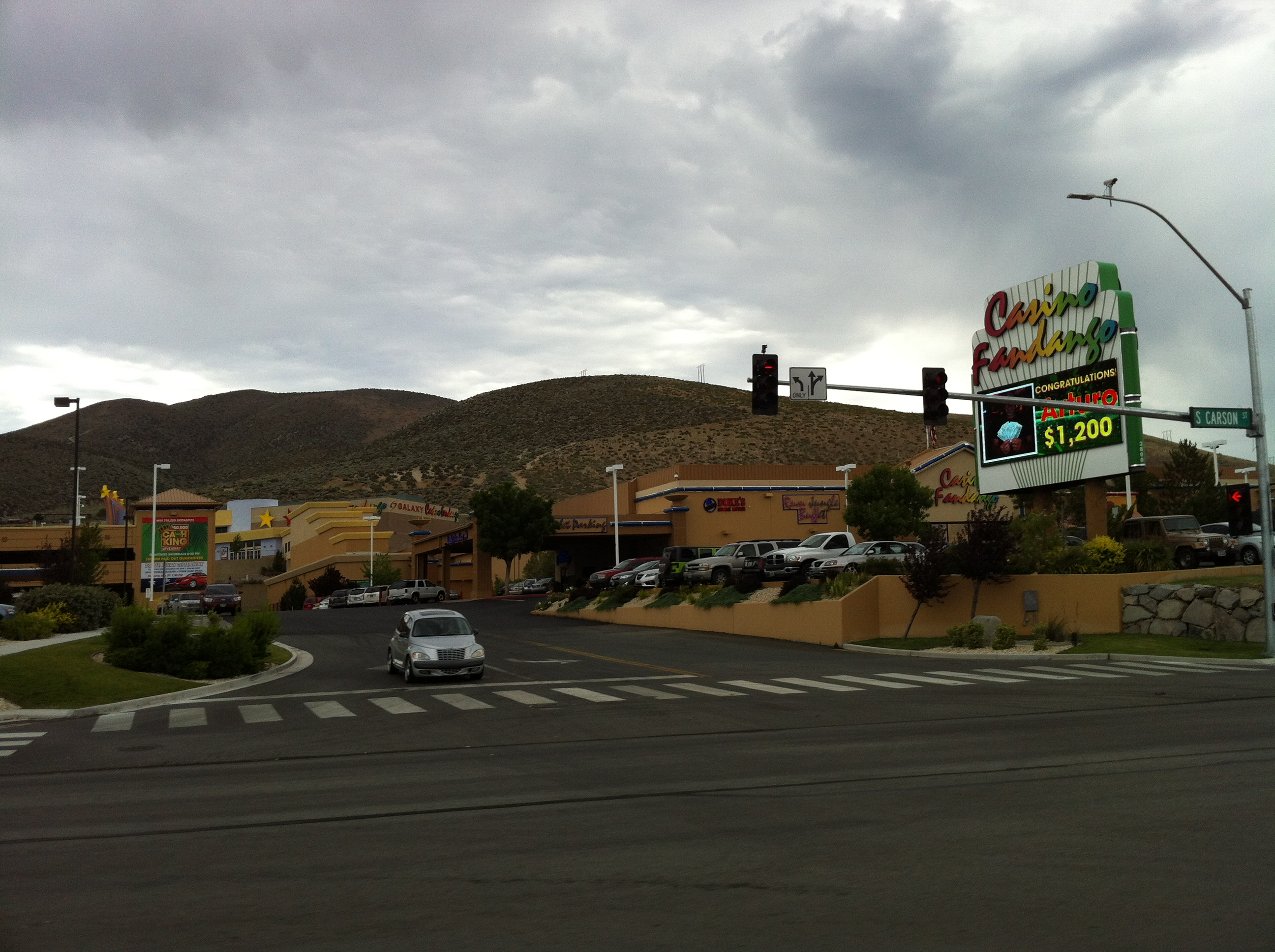
- Interactive map of Casino Fandango
- Location: Carson City, Nevada, U.S.; 3800 South Carson Street (Casino) 3870 South Carson Street (Hotel); 39°7′54″N 119°46′18″W
- Opened: July 31, 2003; 22 years ago
- Theme: Tropical
- No. of rooms: 88
- Gaming space: 40,891 square feet (3,800 m^{2})
- Signature attractions: Courtyard by Marriott; Galaxy Theatres
- Notable restaurants: Duke's Steak House; Palm Court Grill; Rum Jungle Buffet (2004–2020); Shinsen Sushi; Ti Amo Italian Grille
- Owner: Olympia Gaming
- Website: casinofandango.com

Casino Fandango is a hotel and casino located in Carson City, Nevada. It has 40,891 square feet (3,798.9 m^{2}) of gaming space. It is owned and operated by Carson Gaming LLC.

It opened on July 31, 2003.

In 2010, the Casino Fandango won the award for the Premier Entertainment Destination in Carson City by the Nevada Appeal Readers' Choice awards. The complex owned by the Casino Fandango includes a digital movie theater, five restaurants (including a buffet), four bars, a performance stage, a three-story parking garage, and the casino itself. Adjacent to the complex is a Marriott International Courtyard Hotel. The casino includes a large race and sports book owned by William Hill.

As of December 31, 2018, Casino Fandango ceased offering pari-mutuel wagering, leaving nearby Bodines as the only remaining casino for off-track betting in Carson City.
