= Las Vegas Club =

Casino hotel in Nevada, United States

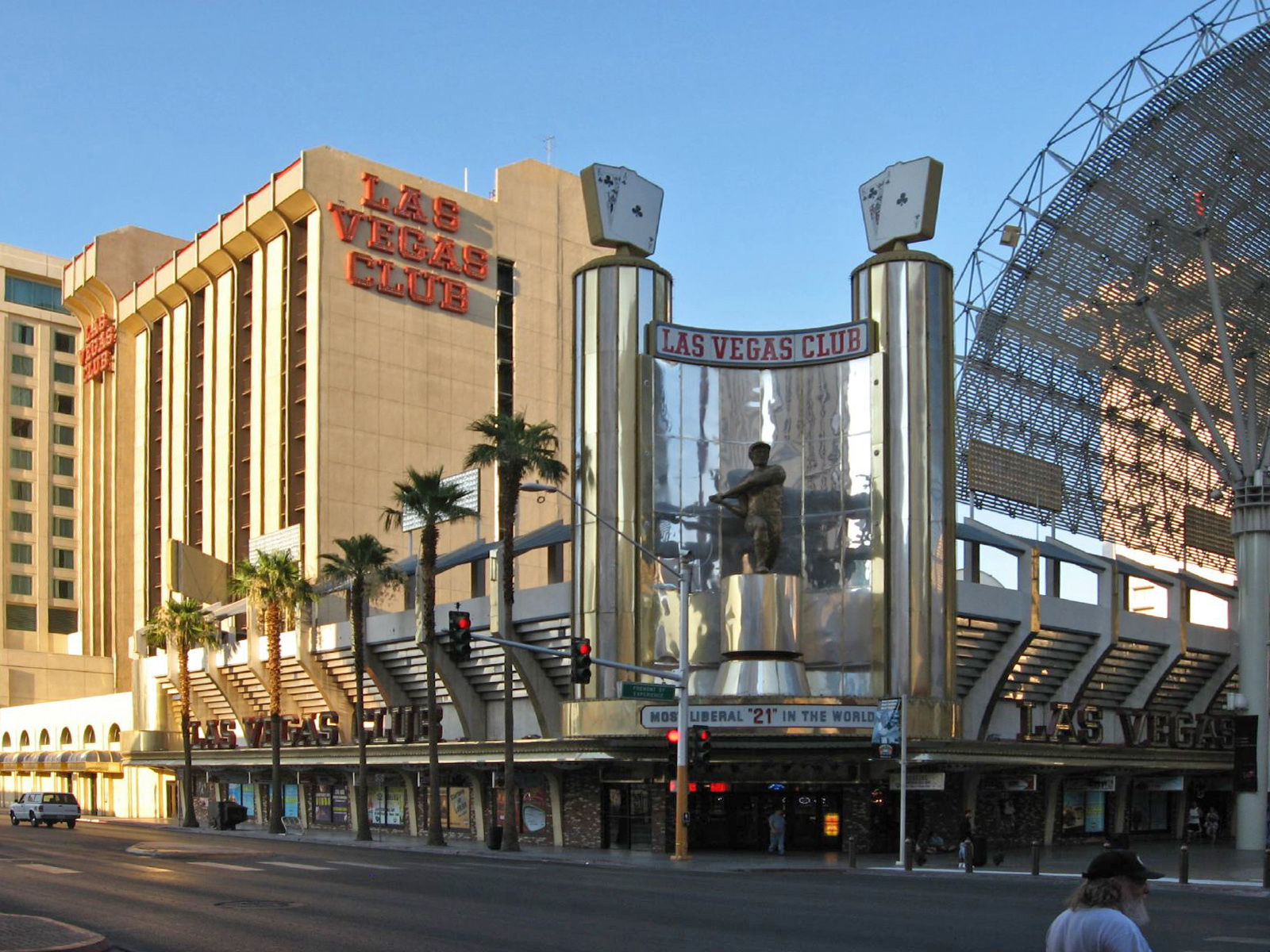
- Las Vegas Club in 2008

- Location within Downtown Las Vegas Location within Nevada
- Interactive map of Las Vegas Club
- Location: Downtown Las Vegas; 18 Fremont Street, Las Vegas, NV 89101; 36.17194°N 115.14528°W
- Opened: Original location: 1908 (Las Vegas Hotel); 1930 (Las Vegas Club); Second location: 1905 (Overland Hotel); 1949 (Las Vegas Club)
- Closed: April 2013 (hotel); August 20, 2015 (casino)
- Theme: Sports
- No. of rooms: 410
- Gaming space: 19,616 sq ft (1,822.4 m^{2})
- Signature attractions: Sports Hall of Fame
- Casino type: Land-based
- Owner: J. Kell Houssels (until 1962); Jackie Gaughan (1962–2004); Mel Exber (1962–2002); Barrick Gaming (2004–05); Tamares Group (2005–15); Derek and Greg Stevens (since 2015)
- Renovated in: 1980, 1996, 2013

Las Vegas Club was a hotel and casino located on the Fremont Street Experience in downtown Las Vegas, Nevada. The Las Vegas Club opened in 1930, joining the Las Vegas Hotel which had opened in 1908. The Las Vegas Club was relocated across the street in 1949. At its new location, the Las Vegas Club operated within the Overland Hotel, which was established in 1905.

Jackie Gaughan and Mel Exber purchased the Las Vegas Club in 1962, and added a sports theme. Hotel towers were added in 1980 and 1996; the latter tower was part of a $35 million expansion. Exber died in 2002, and Gaughan sold the Las Vegas Club to Barrick Gaming in 2004. Barrick's partner, Tamares Group, bought out Barrick's ownership stake in 2005.

The hotel portion, with 410 rooms, was closed in April 2013. Tamares sold the Las Vegas Club two years later to Derek and Greg Stevens, who owned two other downtown casinos. The Stevens closed the Las Vegas Club casino on August 20, 2015, with plans to redevelop the resort through renovations and some demolition. It was later decided that the Las Vegas Club would be demolished entirely for a new resort. Demolition began in 2017, and the Circa Resort & Casino was opened on the site in October 2020.

== History ==
=== Overland Hotel ===
The eventual site of the Las Vegas Club, at the corner of Main Street and Fremont Street, was initially occupied by the Overland Hotel. John Wisner bought the property at a 1905 land auction for $1,750. He opened the Overland Hotel later that year. In 1906, Wisner announced plans to build a two-story addition, with the existing hotel building being renovated to form a wing of the new hotel. The addition was built south of the original structure. Construction of the new building was underway in 1907, and it opened that December. The hotel included gambling and a bar. In early 1911, the ground floor was divided into three business spaces, including one for a restaurant. The hotel burned down in a fire on the night of May 23, 1911. One person was killed, and several were injured after jumping from a second-floor balcony. The fire originated in the hotel's restaurant.

Wisner had plans to rebuild the hotel as a two-story building made of reinforced concrete. The new Overland opened in November 1911, with the same amenities as before. A veranda was soon added to the building, giving it the same appearance as its predecessor. A complete remodeling of the hotel began in 1918. Twelve new hotel rooms were constructed along Main Street in 1921, and the hotel was modernized. Wisner died a year later at the age of 66. His estate went to his daughter, Ethel Wisner Genther. The Genthers carried out further improvements to the hotel in 1924, including renovations to the entire top floor. The Overland included a showroom for salespeople to demonstrate their products.

=== Original Las Vegas Club ===
The Las Vegas Club originally operated on the south side of Fremont Street, at 21-23 Fremont Street, midway between Main and 1st Street. John Horden and Harry Beale had initially built the two-story Las Vegas Hotel (also called the Hotel Las Vegas) in 1908. (Note: An earlier and unrelated establishment, also called Hotel Las Vegas, operated in the area as a temporary tent hotel during 1905.) It operated at 19 Fremont Street, next to the Northern Club casino. An addition was completed in 1911, adding a barbershop, a billiard hall, and card games. The Las Vegas Hotel also included a bar, which was later removed and replaced by a shop in the late 1920s.

The Las Vegas Club opened in late 1930, diagonally across the street from the Overland Hotel. J. Kell Houssels owned the Las Vegas Club with Horden and Arthur Tyner Gilmore, who had spent approximately $1,400 on building improvements prior to the opening. Before Houssel's involvement, the casino had been operating as the Smoke House, owned by Gilmore and located at 23 Fremont Street. The Smoke House had offered card games and pool.

Horden died in 1941. Benny Binion came to Las Vegas in the mid-1940s and became a partner in the Las Vegas Club. In 1948, Houssels was issued a gaming license to operate the casino, although nine associates – including Binion – were denied licensing. Binion then ended his partnership with Houssels and the casino.

In 1949, Houssels was unable to work out a new lease deal with Horden's wife. The Las Vegas Club closed that year, when Houssels relocated it across the street to the Overland Hotel at 18 Fremont Street. Meanwhile, the original Las Vegas Club later operated as The Westerner casino during the 1950s, and then as the Club Bingo until 1983, when it became part of the Pioneer Club.

=== New location ===
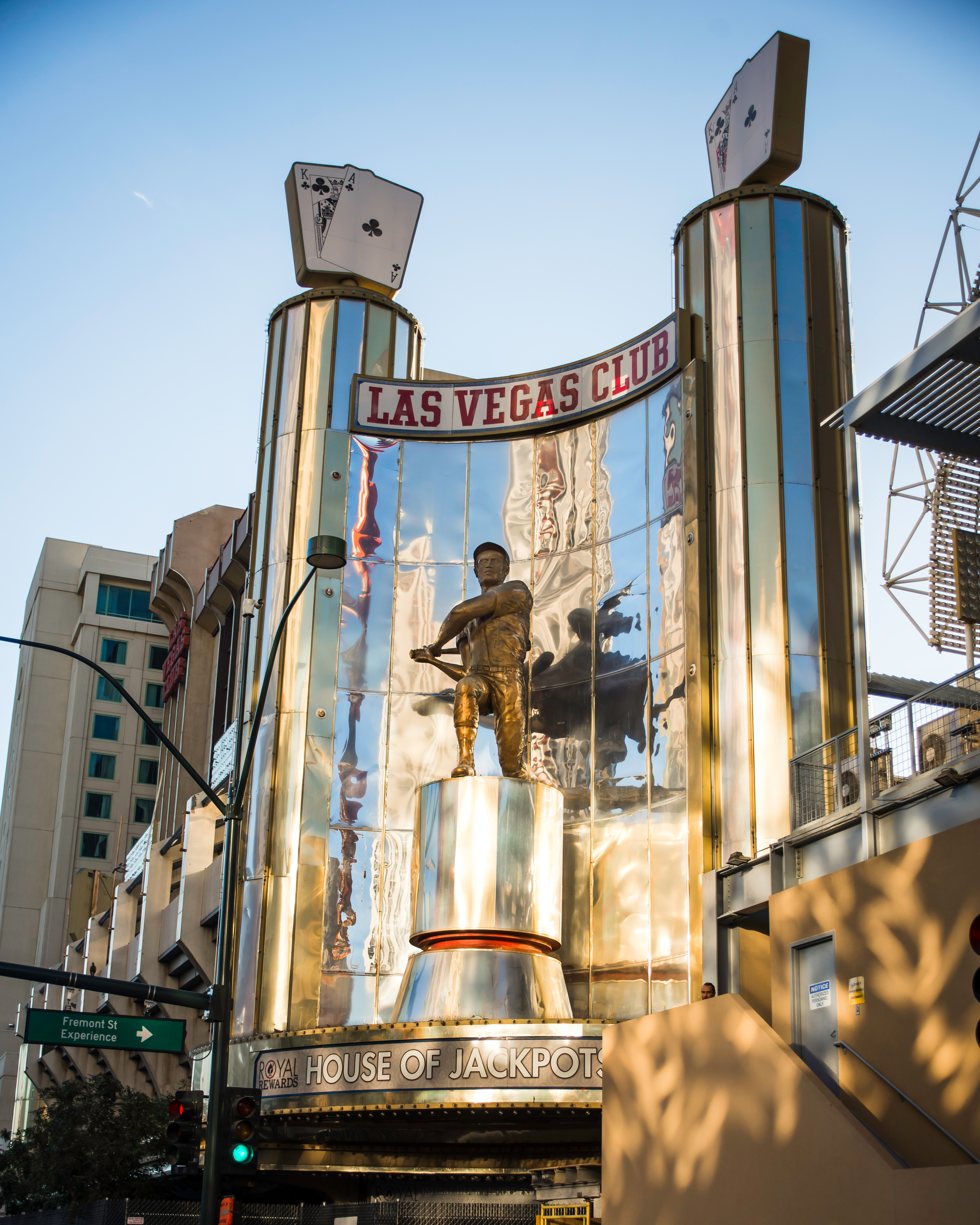
Las Vegas Club facade

At its new location, the Las Vegas Club occupied the bottom floor of the Overland Hotel, while the latter continued operations under its own name for some time. In 1957, Houssels sought state approval for a 15-percent interest in the Las Vegas Club. W. W. Naylor also sought a 12-percent interest. Naylor was the founder of a restaurant chain called Biff's, named after his son. During the 1950s and 1960s, the Las Vegas Club included a Biff's restaurant.

The Las Vegas Club closed in mid-1959. A year and a half later, a group had plans to lease the casino from Houssels and its three other owners: Joe and Vic Hall, and Bernard Vandersteen. The leasing group consisted of gaming executives Jackie Gaughan, Mel Exber and Larry Hezzelwood. In May 1962, Gaughan, Exber and Hezzelwood purchased the Las Vegas Club and Overland Hotel from Houssels. The group also purchased adjoining businesses such as the Chatterbox Bar, which operated inside the Overland. The total sale price was $1 million. Hezzelwood, at the age of 63, died of an apparent heart attack in December 1962. Mel Exber served as the president of the Las Vegas Club, and his brother and son would also work there as executives. The Overland Hotel remained operational during the mid-1960s.

Exber was a fan of sports, especially baseball. A sports theme was added to the Las Vegas Club, and was in place by 1970. Two restaurants were named after baseball concepts, including the Bullpen and the Dugout. The latter restaurant replaced Biff's. The Las Vegas Club also featured the Sports Hall of Fame, an assortment of sports memorabilia from Exber's own collection. The collection included rare photographs, autographed items, and World Series baseball bats from 1946 to 1958. Much of the memorabilia was devoted to the Brooklyn and Los Angeles Dodgers. In addition, the casino issued limited-edition casino chips featuring notable sports players such as Babe Ruth. A Hickok Belt, won by Maury Wills in 1962, was loaned to Exber in 1971 for display in the Las Vegas Club. It was stolen from the casino 10 years later.

In 1975, Gaughan and Exber announced plans for a $4 million expansion, including a 208-room tower to be built behind the Las Vegas Club. The renovation project would also update the exterior to resemble a sports stadium. The Las Vegas Club's facade was inspired by Ebbets Field, where Exber's favorite team, the Brooklyn Dodgers, used to play. The facade included a brass statue of a baseball player, surrounded by a wall of mirrored panels. By 1977, the "Overland" name was no longer in use. Gaughan and Exber ultimately added two hotel towers, the first of which was finished in 1980. Visiting baseball teams would play at nearby Cashman Field and would frequently stay at the Las Vegas Club.

In 1989, the promotional music video for Daite, was filmed at the Las Vegas Club by Japanese singer/composer Chisato Moritaka.

==== Later years ====
In the 1990s, the Las Vegas Club's sports book struggled to compete against those located in newer resorts on the Las Vegas Strip. Most of the sports book's customers were locals, and it had difficulty attracting tourists. The second hotel tower, standing 16 stories high, was topped off in early 1996. The Las Vegas Club ultimately occupied two acres.

A $35 million expansion was opened in October 1996, and was expected to be fully finished a month later. It included an 18,000 sq ft (1,700 m^{2}) casino area designed to resemble a baseball stadium, with murals depicting fans. The casino had a total of 40,000 sq ft (3,700 m^{2}), with 400 new slot machines added, bringing the total number to 850. It also had six blackjack tables, offering the most liberal rules in the world. The original casino facility and the sports book also underwent a renovation. The expansion included the 16-story tower, for a total of 415 rooms. The Dugout coffee shop was expanded and two new restaurants were added, including The Upper Deck, featuring four rooms each themed around a different sport. The expansion was partially influenced by the success of the Fremont Street Experience, located in front of the Las Vegas Club. Exber said that when the expansion was finished, "We will have built a haven for sports fans." The expansion proved to be popular among such fans.

In the late 1990s, Gaughan sought a buyer for the Las Vegas Club, with a selling price of $45 million. Mel Exber died in May 2002, from complications following a stroke. At the end of the year, Gaughan agreed to sell the Las Vegas Club and three other downtown casinos – including the Plaza – to Barrick Gaming. Barrick was in partnership with the Tamares Group. The $82 million sale of the four casinos was finalized in March 2004. In June 2005, Tamares bought out Barrick's 23-percent ownership in the four downtown casinos, including the Las Vegas Club. At the end of the year, Tamares chose Navegante Group to operate the casinos. Navegante did so through an entity known as PlayLV. The casino's sports book was subsequently closed. A new poker room opened in January 2007. Two months later, Tamares announced that it was considering converting the property into a high-rise condo-hotel. This ultimately did not happen.

In May 2007, Navegante announced that it would end its relationship with Tamares within a year, stating that the latter company would be better off finding an operator that could also invest in its properties. At the time, the Las Vegas Club had 780 slot machines and 18 table games. Although Navegante departed, PlayLV continued its role as casino operator. Tinoco's Kitchen, a 120-seat Italian restaurant, opened in early 2009. The casino's gourmet restaurant, Great Moments, closed that year. During 2011, the Las Vegas Club offered the only bingo in downtown Las Vegas. The game was played in a temporary room, as Tamares planned to relocate its bingo operations to the Plaza following renovations there. The Las Vegas Club lacked a pool, although hotel guests had access to the one at the Plaza.

In January 2012, the hotel began limiting its reservations to weekends only. Tamares was considering various possibilities for the Las Vegas Club, although any work on the resort would not take place until the full completion of renovations at the Plaza. Tinoco's Kitchen closed in May 2012, leaving the resort without a major dining option. Later that year, magician The Amazing Johnathan opened SCREAMont Experiment, a Halloween attraction at the Las Vegas Club. It consisted of a haunted house maze. In February 2013, The Amazing Johnathan announced that he was hired to give the Las Vegas Club a complete redesign, although these plans never materialized.

In April 2013, Tamares announced that it would close the Las Vegas Club's hotel at the end of the month. Tamares subsequently redirected prospective hotel guests to the Plaza. The Las Vegas Club had 410 hotel rooms, which never reopened. The casino continued to operate, and renovations were underway at the time of the hotel closing. The Las Vegas Club struggled financially and offered few amenities following the closure of the hotel. A bar offered hot dogs, but casino patrons were otherwise directed to the Plaza for food as well as entertainment.

==== Closure and demolition ====
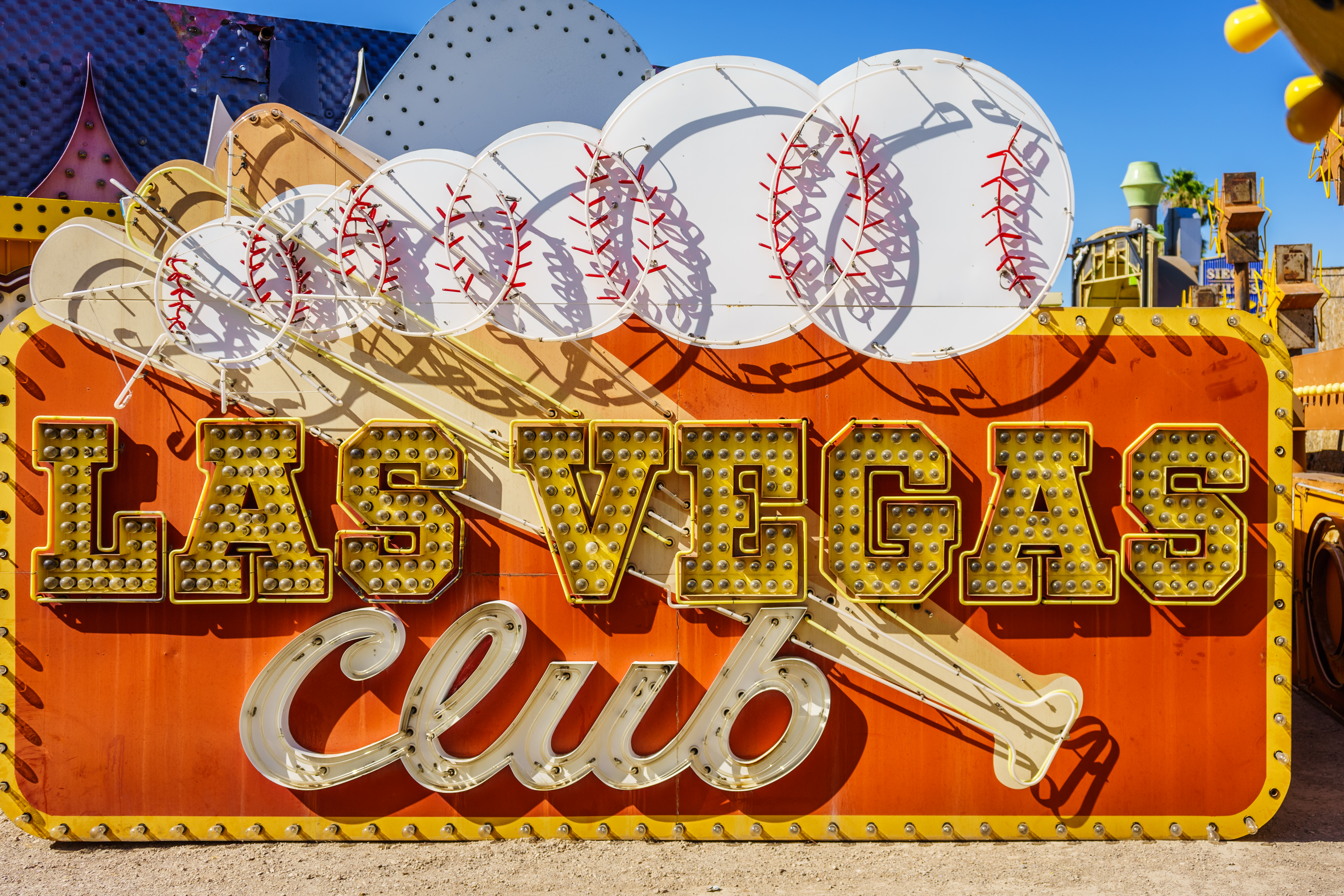
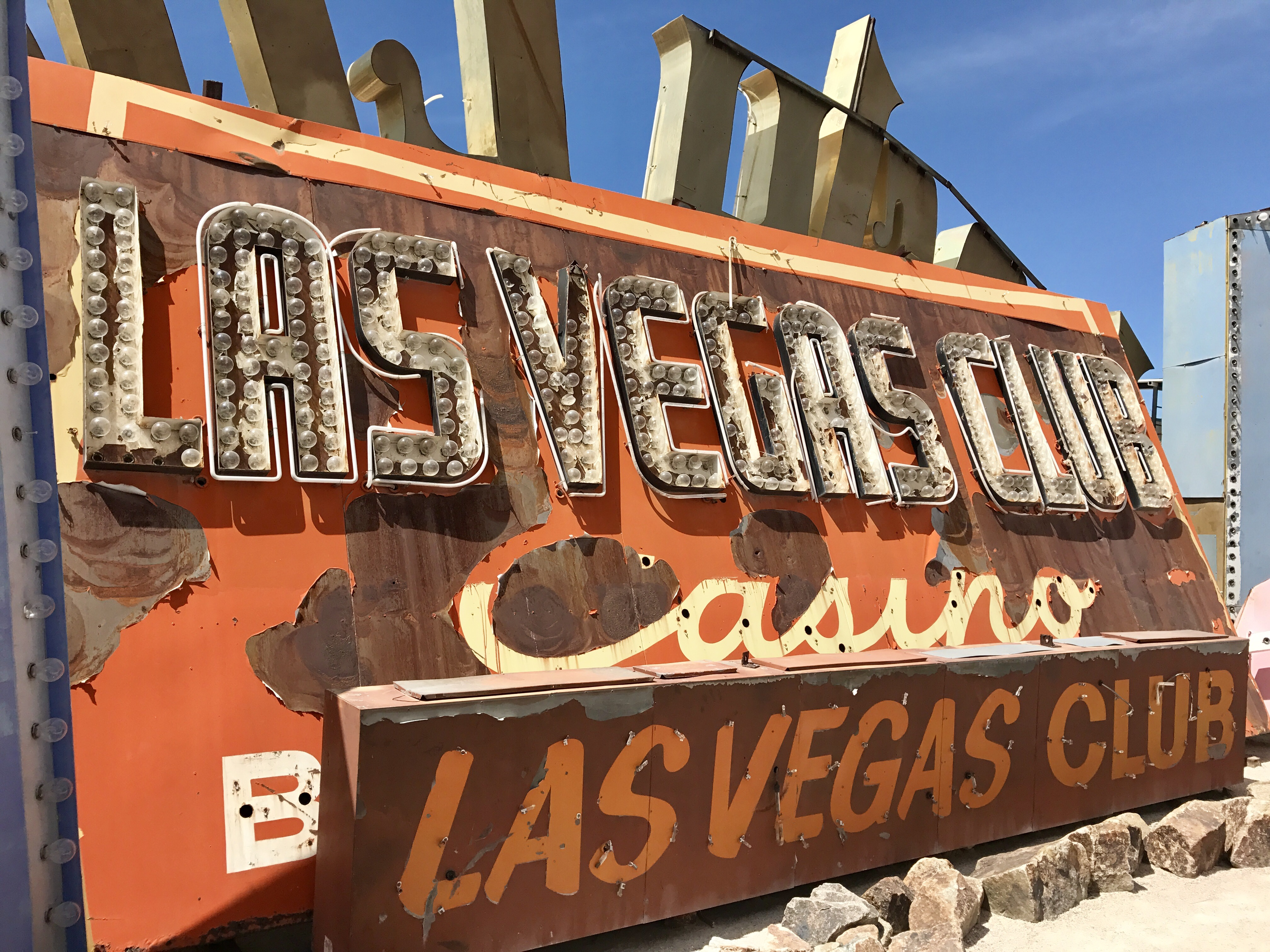
Some signs for the Las Vegas Club were put on display in the city's Neon Museum, as seen in 2017.

In May 2014, Tamares announced its hopes to add a CVS pharmacy to the Las Vegas Club. Plans for a pharmacy proceeded in May 2015. The 13,810 sq ft (1,283 m^{2}) pharmacy would be located on the Las Vegas Club's east side and would sell alcohol. It would take over the casino's corner entrance, reduce gaming space, and replace a bar. At the time, the casino measured 19,616 sq ft (1,822.4 m^{2}) and had 327 slot machines. Other downtown casino owners were opposed to the pharmacy. The Fremont Street Experience had placed limits on alcohol consumption and sales in 2014, although pharmacies were exempt. The opposing casino owners stated that the new rules had reduced the number of emergency calls and "chronic inebriates" in the area, while stating that a pharmacy would bring back problems such as crime and medical emergencies.

On August 14, 2015, it was announced that the Las Vegas Club had been sold to brothers Derek and Greg Stevens, who also owned the Golden Gate and The D casinos in downtown Las Vegas. The Stevens were among opponents of the pharmacy, which was part of a larger vision that Tamares had for redeveloping the Las Vegas Club. However, the company wanted to focus more on its Plaza resort, and the opposition to the pharmacy was a contributing factor in the sale. The Stevens had talked with Tamares five years earlier about purchasing the Las Vegas Club, although the discussions eventually ended, before resuming again in July 2015 amid the pharmacy opposition. The sale did not include the "Las Vegas Club" name.

A day after the sale was announced, Derek Stevens said that the Las Vegas Club would close in 60 days for renovations and some demolition. However, it was announced later in the day that the casino would be shutting down over the next five days. The casino's 19 table games closed on August 16, 2015, leaving only slot machines and the casino cage open. The remainder of the casino was closed on August 20, 2015, shortly after midnight. The closing received little fanfare. A small group of regular customers visited the casino ahead of its closing. A gift shop remained open through the end of the month. Some employees of the Las Vegas Club were transferred to the Plaza. The sports memorabilia was soon sold off to the public.

After the closure, Derek Stevens planned to evaluate the building over the next few months to determine how to use the property. He initially expected redevelopment to consist of renovations combined with demolition and new construction. However, he disliked the resort's design and eventually decided to demolish it entirely, in favor of a new project known as Circa Resort & Casino. In April 2016, the Stevens purchased adjacent businesses – such as the Mermaids Casino – which would also be demolished for the new resort. The extra property provided new possibilities for a larger version of the Stevens' upcoming resort, and the brothers took additional time to determine specifics about the new project.

To retain the property's gaming license, 16 slot machines in the Las Vegas Club were temporarily opened to the public for eight hours on June 27, 2017. Demolition of small buildings, such as Mermaids, was underway in August 2017, before moving on to the Las Vegas Club hotel towers by October. Because of the location, demolition of the towers proceeded one floor at a time for the safety of the public. Demolition continued into early 2018 and was expected to conclude around that time. Circa opened in October 2020.
