= Gold Spike (property) =

Complex in Nevada, United States

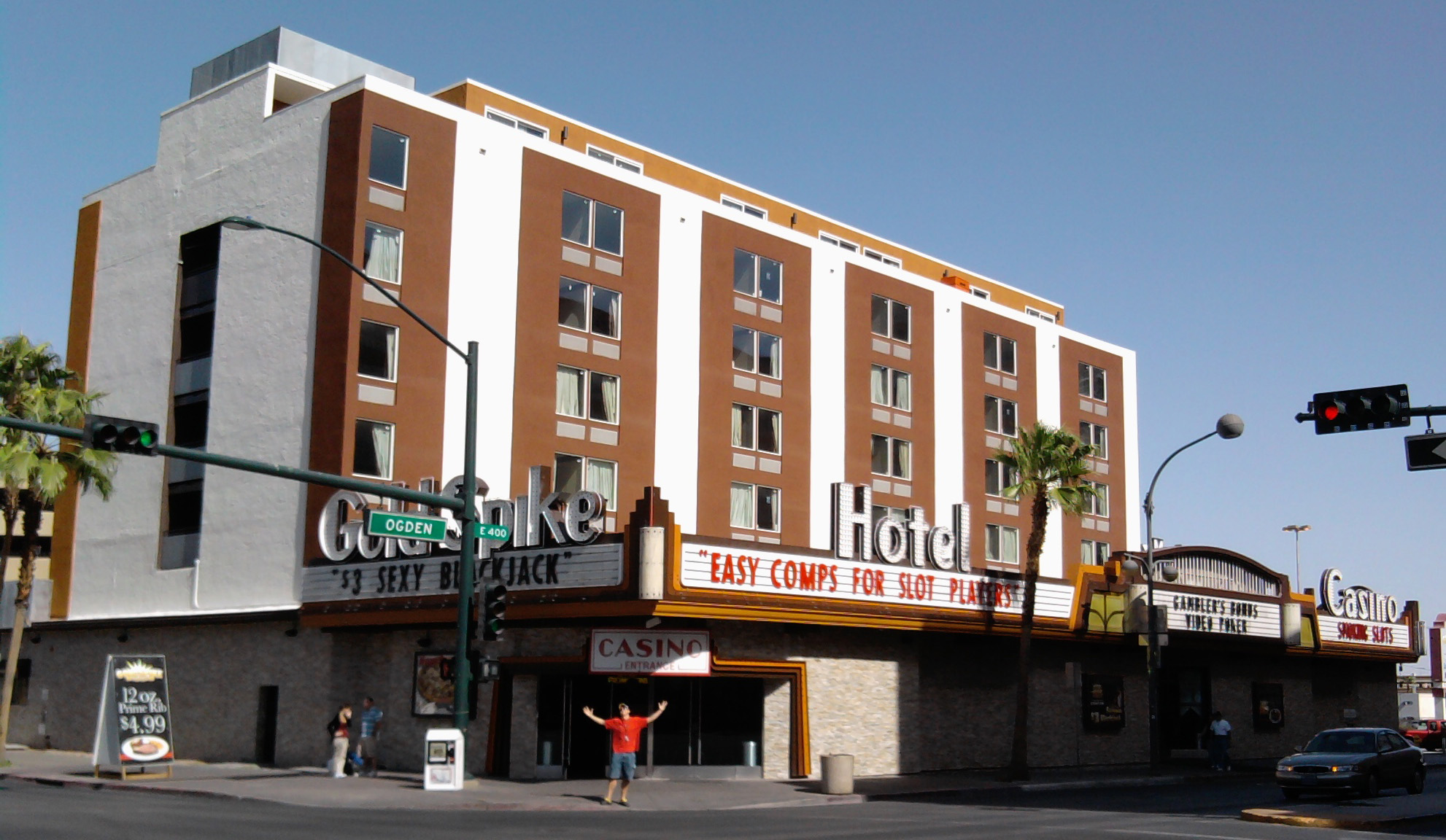
- Gold Spike shortly after its extensive remodeling in 2009
- Former names: Rendezvous, Gold Spike Hotel & Casino

General information
- Type: Residential
- Location: Las Vegas, Nevada, 217 Las Vegas Blvd North
- Opening: 1976
- Renovated: 2008–2010, 2013
- Owner: Tony Hsieh

Other information
- Number of rooms: 162
- Number of restaurants: Golden Grille

Website
- http://www.goldspike.com/

Gold Spike Hotel & Casino
- Location within Downtown Las Vegas Location within Nevada Location within the United States
- Interactive map of Gold Spike Hotel & Casino
- Location: Las Vegas, Nevada; 217 Las Vegas Blvd North; 36°10′16″N 115°08′26″W
- Opened: 1976
- Closed: April 14, 2013
- No. of rooms: 112
- Gaming space: 6,000 sq ft (560 m^{2})
- Notable restaurants: Golden Grille
- Casino type: Land-based
- Owner: The Siegel Group
- Operating license holder: Golden Gaming
- Architect: Jon Jerde, DeRuyter Butler and Atlandia Design
- Previous names: Rendezvous
- Renovated in: 2004, 2006, 2011

Gold Spike (formerly Gold Spike Hotel & Casino) is a bar, lounge, residential building, and former boutique 112-room, seven floor hotel. It is connected with the Oasis at the Gold Spike, a 50-room three floor hotel located in downtown Las Vegas. It was owned by entrepreneur Tony Hsieh and his Downtown Project, having bought it from The Siegel Group; and the casino was operated by Golden Gaming.

Hsieh closed the casino on April 14, 2013. After a three-week remodel, Gold Spike re-opened the casino as a restaurant and bar on May 6, 2013. The hotel portion of the building was recently converted into permanent and temporary workforce housing for Downtown Project, entrepreneurs, and Zappos; Oasis hotel is a separate building on the same property.

== History ==
=== Rendezvous (1976–85) ===
It originally opened in 1976 as the 112-room Rendezvous, owned by the 76 Corporation. In 1983 Jackie Gaughan purchased the property after it had been closed for several months.

=== Gold Spike Hotel & Casino (1985–2013) ===
The Gold Spike, for many years, was known as an inexpensive downtown Las Vegas hotel with decent rooms, limited amenities, and a decent sized casino.

On December 6, 2002, Jackie Gaughan agreed to sell the Gold Spike and three other casinos to Barrick Gaming. This sale, along with several other downtown Las Vegas hotel/casinos, was completed in 2004, for a combined total of about $82 million. Barrick Gaming Corp was in partnership with Tamares Group. After the purchase, management discontinued the table games and only offered slot machines. In a few years the property was offered for sale.

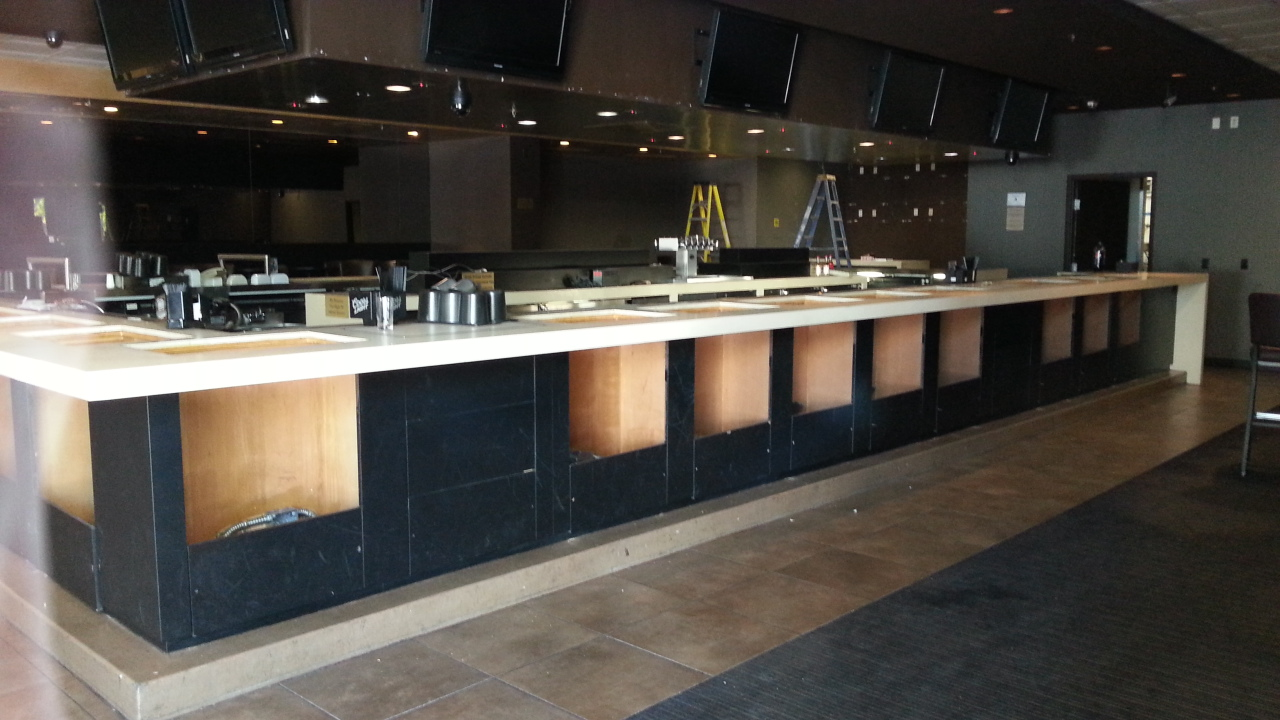
Remodeling of the bar after its purchase by Hsieh

On July 23, 2007, Greg Covin bought the property for $15.6 million with the intention of turning it into a boutique hotel.

Covin sold The Gold Spike on February 4, 2008 for $21 million to The Siegel Group.

The Siegel Group set out to completely renovate the property and combine it with an old and forgotten 52-room motel located next to the property. As one author wrote, the Gold Spike now has "Quartz walls, tile floors, wood accents, and new everything", making it "a very modern boutique hotel in the heart of downtown". The first floor, containing the gaming floor, the bar, and the restaurant, was completely renovated by February 2009.

By April 2010, all guest floors and the exterior of the hotel has been completely remodeled and renovated. In May 2010, the Oasis Pool opened, giving Gold Spike a swimming pool.

=== Casino closure ===
On April 10, 2013, it was reported that the property's debt had been acquired by Tony Hsieh's Downtown Project, a campaign to revitalize downtown Las Vegas.

Siegel then announced that it had sold the Gold Spike to the Downtown Project, and that the casino would close on April 14. Siegel retained rights to the Gold Spike name, and said that the company needed to dispose of smaller properties on its way to owning larger casinos on the Strip. Hsieh was reported to be considering several ideas for the property, including a boutique hotel, specialty retail space, or a club, but ruled out a casino, saying that he was "trying to help build a community". In 2014, Gold Spike reopened the former casino area as a bar and lounge with social games. Gold Spike renovated its top floor into a penthouse suite for the thirty-first season of the MTV television series Real World, Real World: Go Big or Go Home. This suite can now be rented by the public and it is in the Gold Spike property and not The Oasis.

== Oasis at The Gold Spike ==
The adjacent 3-story motel was originally built in 1962 as a 57-room Travel Inn Motel. The property was abandoned, becoming a blight between the Fremont Street Experience and Las Vegas City Hall. The Siegel Group purchased this property in August 2007 for $5 million and started making plans to renovate it and reopen the property. Plans were put on hold when they purchased the neighboring Gold Spike. Finally, by April 2010, the rooms had been completely renovated and renamed "The Oasis at The Gold Spike" and connected to the Gold Spike via an outdoor lounge and walkway. After a reconfiguration of the property, it was left with 50-rooms, which have been modernized and turned into bungalow suites.

The Oasis at the Gold Spike had the distinction of being the only downtown hotel with a Las Vegas Blvd. address. In May 2010, the city of Las Vegas changed the entire Gold Spike property to this address.
