= Plaza Hotel & Casino =

Casino hotel in Las Vegas, Nevada, US

Coordinates: 36.17175°N 115.14651°W

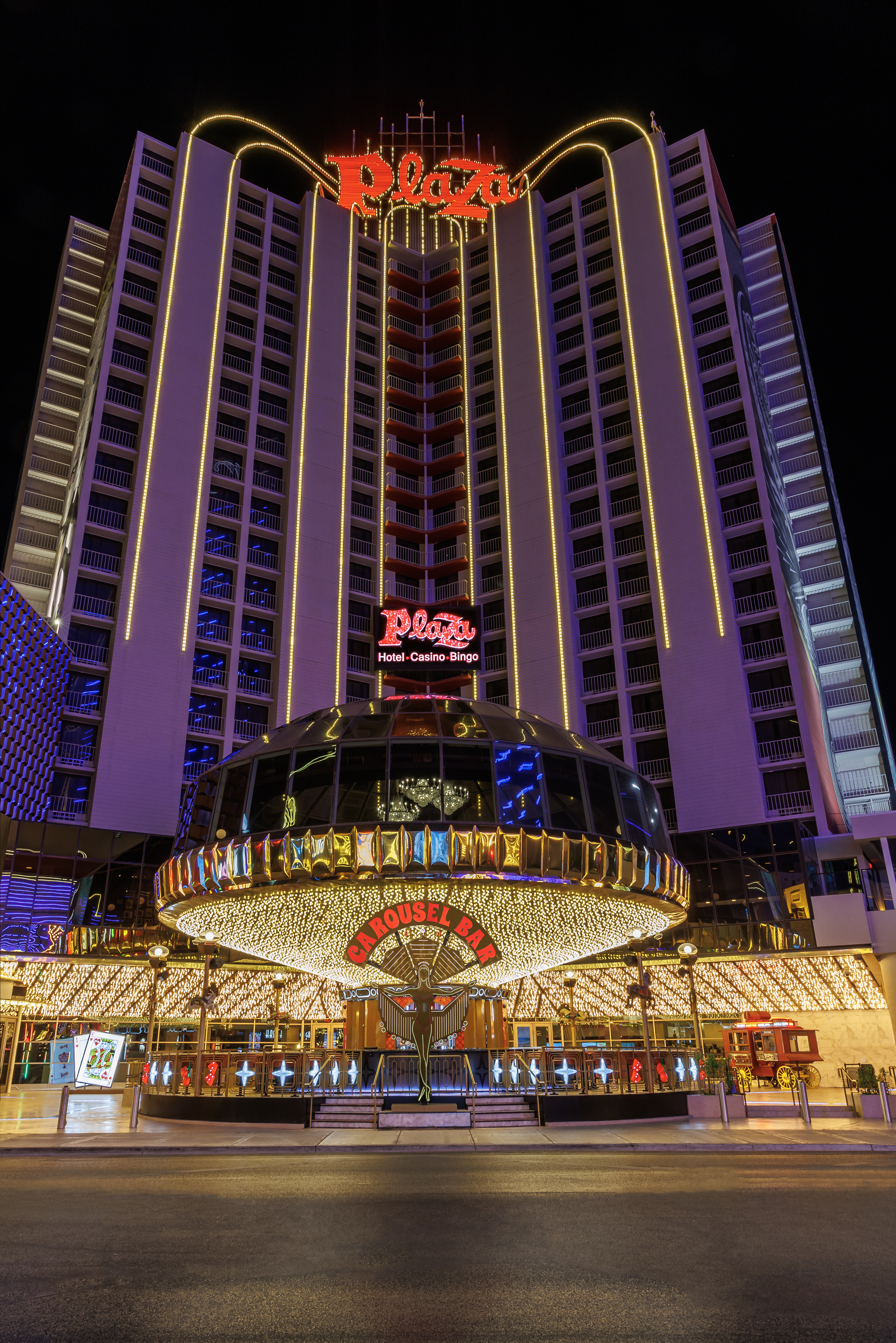

- Location within Downtown Las Vegas Location within Nevada
- Interactive map of Plaza Hotel and Casino
- Location: Downtown Las Vegas; 1 Main Street Las Vegas, NV 89101
- Opened: July 2, 1971
- Theme: Classic
- No. of rooms: 995
- Gaming space: 80,000 sq ft (7,400 m^{2})
- Permanent shows: Miss Behave's Mavericks
- Signature attractions: Carousel Bar, CORE Arena, rooftop pool, and 13 pickleball courts
- Notable restaurants: Oscar's Steakhouse; Hash House A Go Go; Pop Up Pizza
- Casino type: Land-based
- Owner: Tamares Group
- Previous names: Union Plaza
- Renovated in: 2004, 2011, 2019, 2023
- Website: www.plazahotelcasino.com

The Plaza Hotel & Casino is a hotel and casino located in downtown Las Vegas, Nevada. It currently has 995 rooms and suites, an 80,000-square-foot (7,400 m^{2}) casino and more than 25,000 square feet (2,300 m^{2}) of event space. The Plaza Hotel also has a showroom, rooftop swimming pool, fitness center, bingo room, restaurants, a sports bar, and Oscar's Steakhouse, named after the former Mayor of Las Vegas, Oscar Goodman.

== History ==
=== Las Vegas Union Pacific Station ===
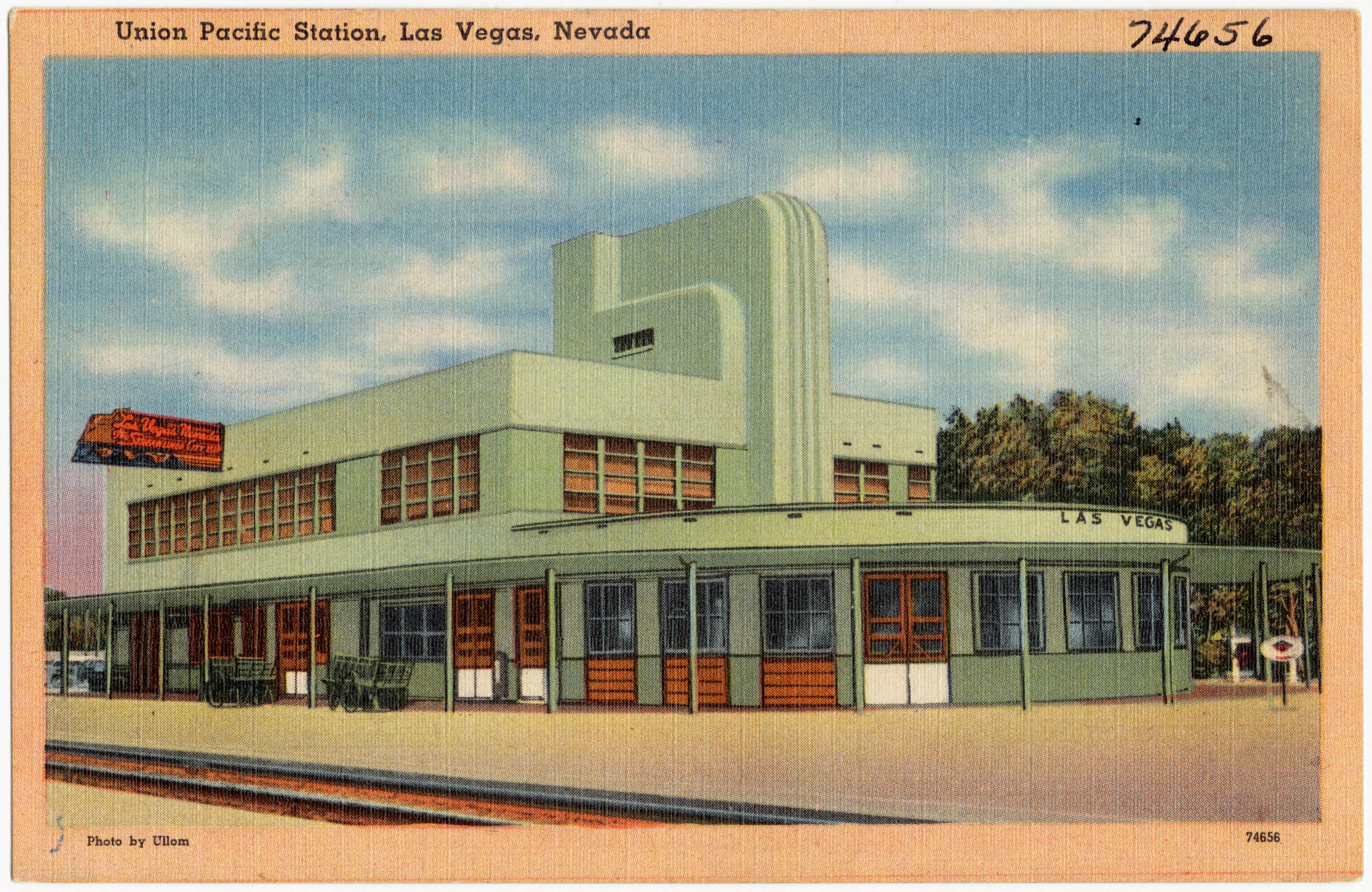
Union Pacific Station, Las Vegas, c. 1940

Before the construction of The Plaza, a Spanish-style depot constructed in 1906 acted as the first train station in Las Vegas on the site. Union Pacific replaced the structure in 1940 with a Streamline Moderne station designed by H. L. Gogerty, including a Union Pacific shield and a "Streamliners & Challengers" neon sign. The station was demolished in 1970. The original casino, Union Plaza about the railroad station, included a small waiting room for Amtrak train passengers.

=== Union Plaza Hotel and Casino ===
The hotel was built on the station site by Upland Industries (Union Pacific's real estate division), along with the Scott Corp, headed by Frank E. Scott. The hotel opened on July 1, 1971, with the casino opening at midnight, being managed by a team of local casino executives including Sam Boyd, Jackie Gaughan, JK Houssels Jr, and Bill Boyd. It was advertised as the largest casino in the world. With 504 rooms, Plaza's hotel was the same size as Fremont Hotel and merely a third of the size of The International Hotel & Casino, but Plaza contained the largest casino floor in Las Vegas at 66,000 square feet. Before the discontinuation of the Desert Wind train route on May 10, 1997, Amtrak built its Las Vegas station directly connected to the hotel. It was the only train station in the United States that was located in a casino. The Las Vegas Greyhound bus station was also located at the Plaza from the hotel's opening until management terminated the lease and the station moved on February 23, 2021.

=== Plaza Hotel & Casino ===
Barrick Gaming Corporation acquired the Plaza from Jackie Gaughan. During his ownership, D.W. Barrick's friend, Larry Manetti, who played Orville "Rick" Wright on the television show Magnum, P.I., hosted a celebrity brunch every Sunday, featuring such guests as Pat Morita and Steve Rossi. He also owned Manetti's in the Plaza. When Barrick sold its interest in the hotel to the Tamares Group in late 2005, Manetti closed his restaurant and severed his relationship with the hotel.

On July 1, 2005, then-mayor Oscar Goodman claimed, "If I had my druthers, I would like to have somebody in place to discuss imploding the Plaza." Goodman wanted to see the Plaza replaced with new construction, creating a scenic entrance to Union Park. In the decades since, the Plaza has invested millions of dollars into property improvements, earning Goodman's support. Since 2011, the former mayor has lent his name to the property's steakhouse, which resides in the Plaza's famed glass dome.

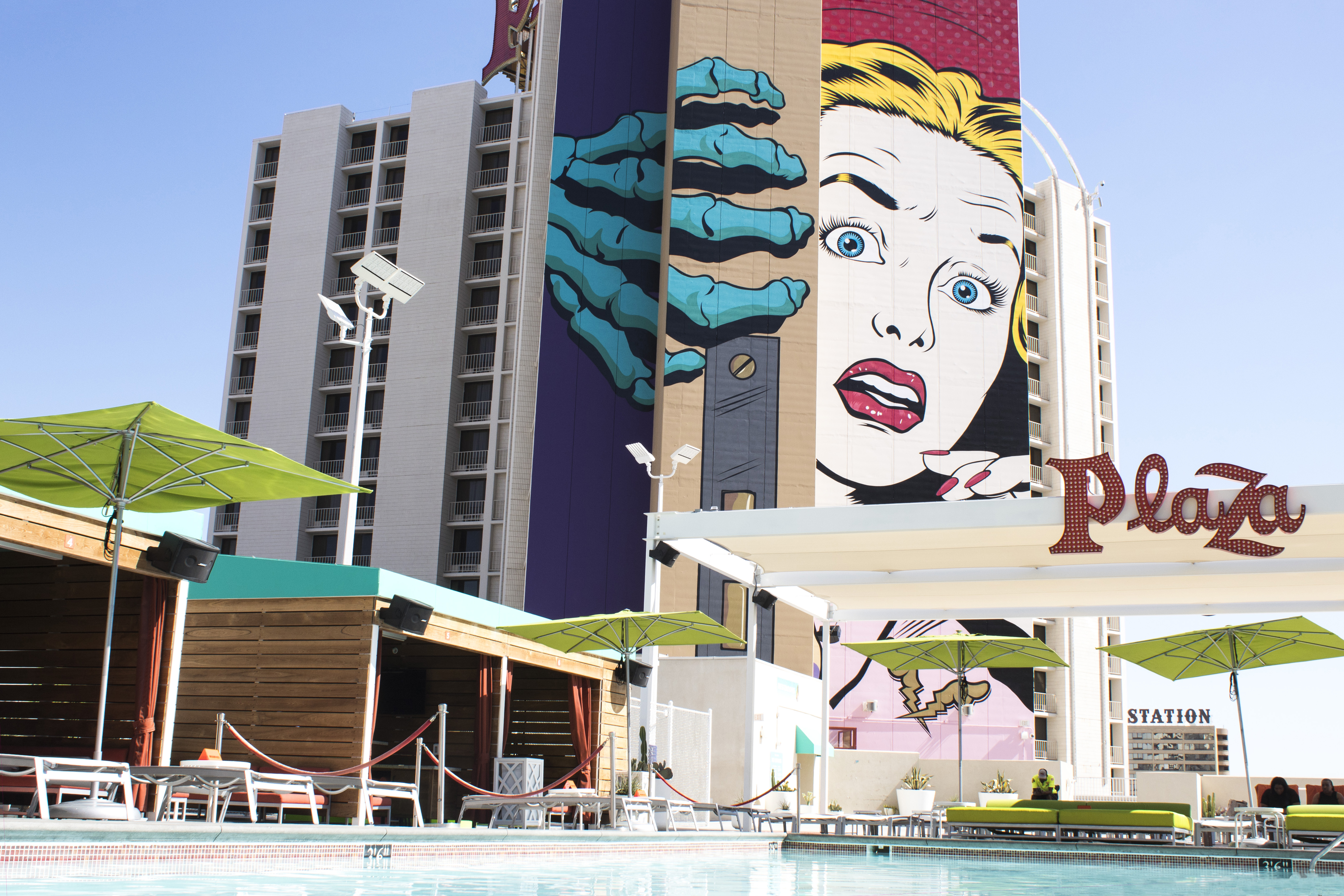
The Plaza's rooftop pool with D*Face mural on North Tower in the background

The hotel closed for renovations on November 11, 2010. It acquired furniture, carpets, and fixtures from the bankrupt Fontainebleau Resort Las Vegas project on the Las Vegas Strip. From November 2010 to August 2011, the Plaza operated its sports & racebook, showroom, one bar, and a portion of the casino. By March 2011, the south tower and the casino had finished renovations, re-opening on August 24, 2011. The hotel officially re-opened for business on September 1, 2011. The renovation project cost was $35 million. The property has undertaken numerous renovations and amenity enhancement projects since 2011. In 2014, the Plaza announced that a new 3,500-seat facility would be constructed at the hotel to become the new home arena for the Las Vegas Wranglers minor league hockey team of the ECHL. However, the hockey team suspended operations for the 2014–15 season and would eventually fold mid-season. In 2016, the Plaza fully refurbished its rooftop pool, creating an outdoor space with a wet deck, hot tub, private cabanas, bar, and food truck. The Plaza has 13 pickleball courts, more than any other hotel-casino in Las Vegas. The Plaza built the multipurpose venue CORE Arena, an equestrian center in downtown Las Vegas with 80 equine stalls, which hosts events like rodeos and monster truck shows. CORE Arena has hosted the Las Vegas Days Rodeo in partnership with the Commission for the Las Vegas Centennial since 2019. In 2019, a $15 million renovation created more than 100 Luxe guest rooms and suites on the top floors of the North Tower. The Plaza has three 21-story murals by artists Shepard Fairey, D*Face and Faile on its North Tower.

In 2023, the Plaza unveiled its Main Street façade renovations, with four new venues. The renovation was centered around Carousel Bar, an outdoor bar with life-sized animated Vegas-themed elements, including moving carousel horses, a 14 ft (4.3 m) tall neon sign, a rotating ribbon of lights, and outdoor video poker machines with seating for nearly 100 guests overlooking the Fremont Street Experience. U2 filmed their music video "Atomic City" at Carousel Bar in September 2023. The Main Street renovations also included Pinkbox Doughnuts across from Carousel Bar and a smoke-free gaming area that opened in partnership with Brian Christopher on the other side. Overlooking the new Main Street venues is a rooftop patio at Oscar's Steakhouse, an al fresco fine dining space. Hosted by Amy Saunders, the variety show Miss Behave's Mavericks debuted at the Plaza on October 2, 2024.

== In popular culture ==
=== Film ===
- The Union Plaza, still under construction, as well as a "coming soon" sign in front, is prominently visible during the Fremont Street car chase in the 1971 James Bond film, Diamonds Are Forever.
- In 1975 Warner Bros filmed scenes in the casino for Rafferty and the Gold Dust Twins, starring Alan Arkin.
- In the 1989 film Back to the Future Part II, Biff Tannen's Pleasure Paradise Casino Hotel is based on the structure of neon lights & signs of the Plaza.
- The Union Plaza played a major role in the 1992 movie Cool World.
- In the 1995 film Casino, a scene starring Robert De Niro and Sharon Stone plays inside the Center Stage Restaurant, where Ginger (played by Stone) and Sam (De Niro) argue over missing money.
- In the 2000 film Pay It Forward, a scene starring Kevin Spacey plays inside the Center Stage Restaurant.
- In the 2001 film The Mexican, Samantha (Julia Roberts) and Winston (James Gandolfini) stay at the Plaza, where Frank (Michael Cerveris) is thrown off a balcony and killed.
- In the 2003 film Looney Tunes: Back in Action, the Plaza serves as the hotel tower for "Yosemite Sam's Wooden Nickel" casino.
- In the 2004 film The Girl Next Door, desperate to win Danielle (Elisha Cuthbert) back, Matt (Emile Hirsch) and his friends follow her to Las Vegas and find her performing at a convention, which appears to be taking place at the Plaza.
- In the 2008 film The Grand, the Plaza serves as the hotel tower for "The Rabbit's Foot".
- The Plaza played a major role in the 2008 film Yonkers Joe.

=== Television ===
- In the 1994 miniseries Stephen King's The Stand, the Union Plaza played a key role as the headquarters of Randall Flagg (taking the place of the MGM Grand from the 1978 novel).
- The syndicated Ultimate Poker Challenge and the currently-running National Wrestling Alliance program NWA Wrestling Showcase, airing on Colours TV were taped at the Plaza.
- In early 2010, CBS finished production of The Odds, a show that was to take place at the Plaza and along the Fremont Street Experience, starring Donald Faison.

=== Music videos ===
- Carousel Bar and the Main Street entrance of the Plaza are featured prominently in "Atomic City" by U2.
- The Plaza is featured in many scenes of the video "We Built This City" by Starship, even though the song refers to 1980s Los Angeles, San Francisco, Cleveland, and New York City, but not Las Vegas.
- The Plaza was featured prominently in Mase's "Feels So Good".
- Mase's video was parodied by Monster Magnet, who also filmed in front of the Plaza.
- Some scenes of Iggy Azalea's "Change Your Life" were shot at The Plaza.
- Some scenes from The Killers "The Man" were filmed at The Plaza in 2017.
- Portions of The Weeknd's "Heartless" were filmed at The Plaza.
- American rappers and Migos members Takeoff and Quavo filmed there for their "Hotel Lobby (Unc & Phew)" music video.

=== Gambling history ===
- On April 11, 2004, Ashley Revell, 32 years old, of Kent, England, sold all his possessions and traveled to the Plaza to bet his life savings of $135,300 on one spin of the roulette wheel. He won and doubled his money.
