= Golden Nugget Lake Charles =

Waterfront casino resort in Louisiana

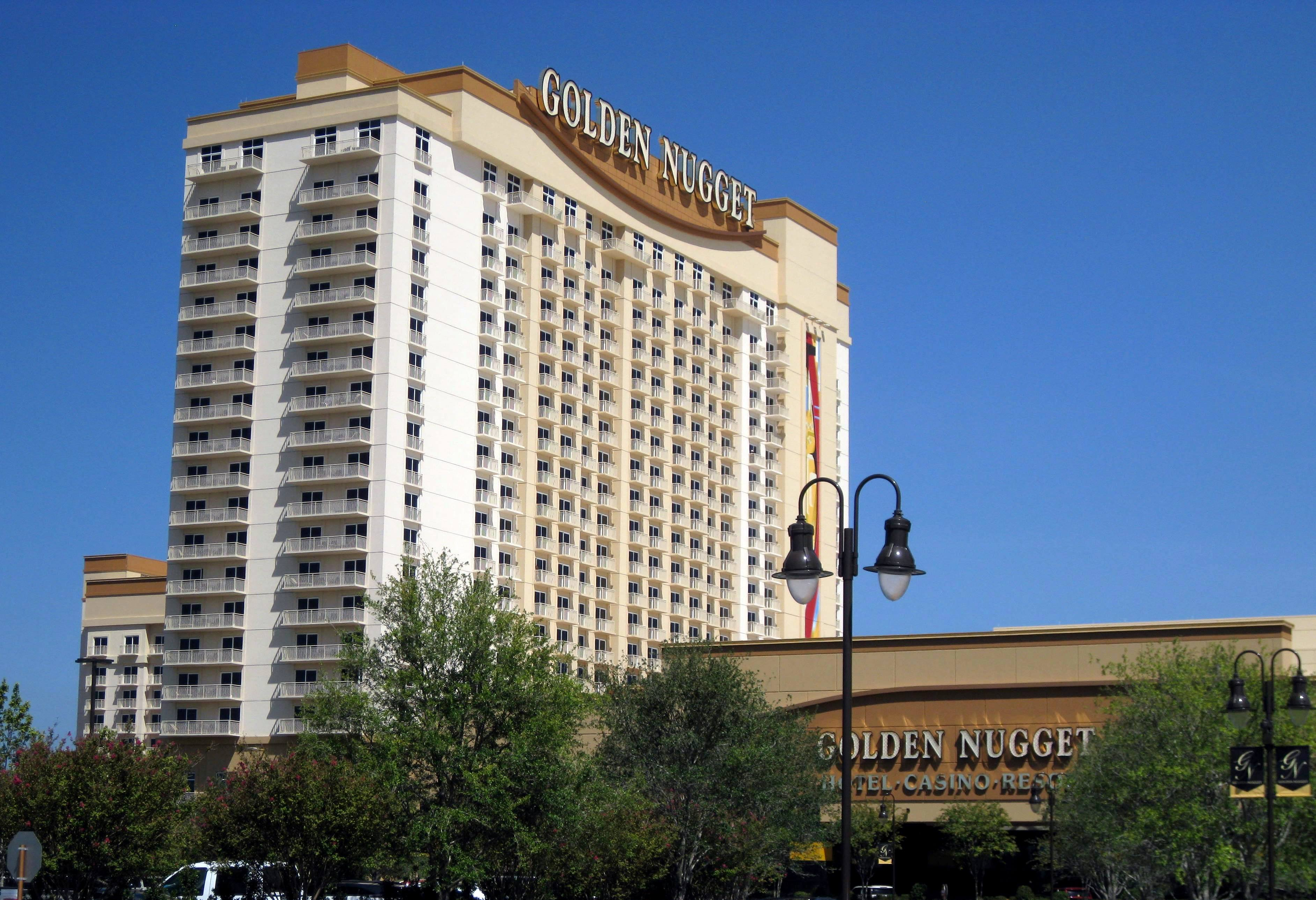
- Interactive map of Golden Nugget Lake Charles
- Location: 2550 Golden Nugget Blvd, Lake Charles, Louisiana United States; 30.20477°N 93.26374°W
- Opened: December 7, 2014
- No. of rooms: 1,038
- Signature attractions: Private marina Beach; 18-hole golf course
- Notable restaurants: Vic & Anthony's Steakhouse; Saltgrass Steak House; Cadillac Bar; Landry's Seafood; Lillie's Asian Cuisine; Grotto Ristorante; Claim Jumper; The Buffet; Chart House
- Owner: Landry's, Inc.
- Website: goldennugget.com/lakecharles

Golden Nugget Lake Charles is a 242-acre waterfront casino resort in Lake Charles, Louisiana, United States, owned and operated by Houston-based Landry's, Inc. The resort features 1038 guest rooms and suites housed in a 22-story tower, an 18-hole golf course, 30,000 square feet of meeting space, more than a dozen dining and bar options, a private beach, marina, spa & salon, retail corridor and expansive 24-hour casino floor.

Golden Nugget Lake Charles is the fifth Golden Nugget property, joining the original location in Downtown Las Vegas, and others in Laughlin, Nevada; Atlantic City, New Jersey and Biloxi, Mississippi.

== History ==
Pinnacle Entertainment announced plans in 2006 to build Sugarcane Bay, a $350-million casino resort, next to its L'Auberge du Lac casino in Lake Charles. The plan was canceled in 2010, and Pinnacle returned the gaming license to the state.

In February 2011, the license was awarded to Creative Casinos LLC, the company of former Pinnacle chairman Dan Lee, for a $400-million casino named Mojito Pointe to be built on the Sugarcane Bay site.

Ameristar Casinos purchased Creative Casinos in June 2012 for $32.5 million, after Lee had difficulty financing construction. The project was renamed Ameristar Lake Charles.

In December 2012, Pinnacle agreed to acquire Ameristar. To obtain approval for the merger from FTC antitrust regulators, Pinnacle agreed to the sale of two of the combined company's properties, including Ameristar Lake Charles. A sale agreement was reached with Landry's, Inc., parent company of the Golden Nugget casinos, who agreed to pay the costs expended on the project's development to date.

Landry's owner Tilman J. Fertitta announced improvements and upgrades to the property, investing more than $600 million in the project, one of the most expensive construction endeavors in the United States at the time. In December 2013, construction topped out on the 25-story accommodations tower. Located just two hours from Houston, Fertitta had long desired a casino-resort near the headquarters of Landry's, Inc.

The casino opened to the public on December 7, 2014.

In August 2022, Draftkings' announced a new sportsbook retail location within the hotel. The location opened on September 1, 2022 and would be the largest Draft kings' retail sportsbook location in Louisiana.

== Facilities ==
=== Gaming ===
The casino floor at Golden Nugget Lake Charles features a 6-table poker room, 1,600 slot machines, 60 table games and high-limit gaming.

=== Dining ===
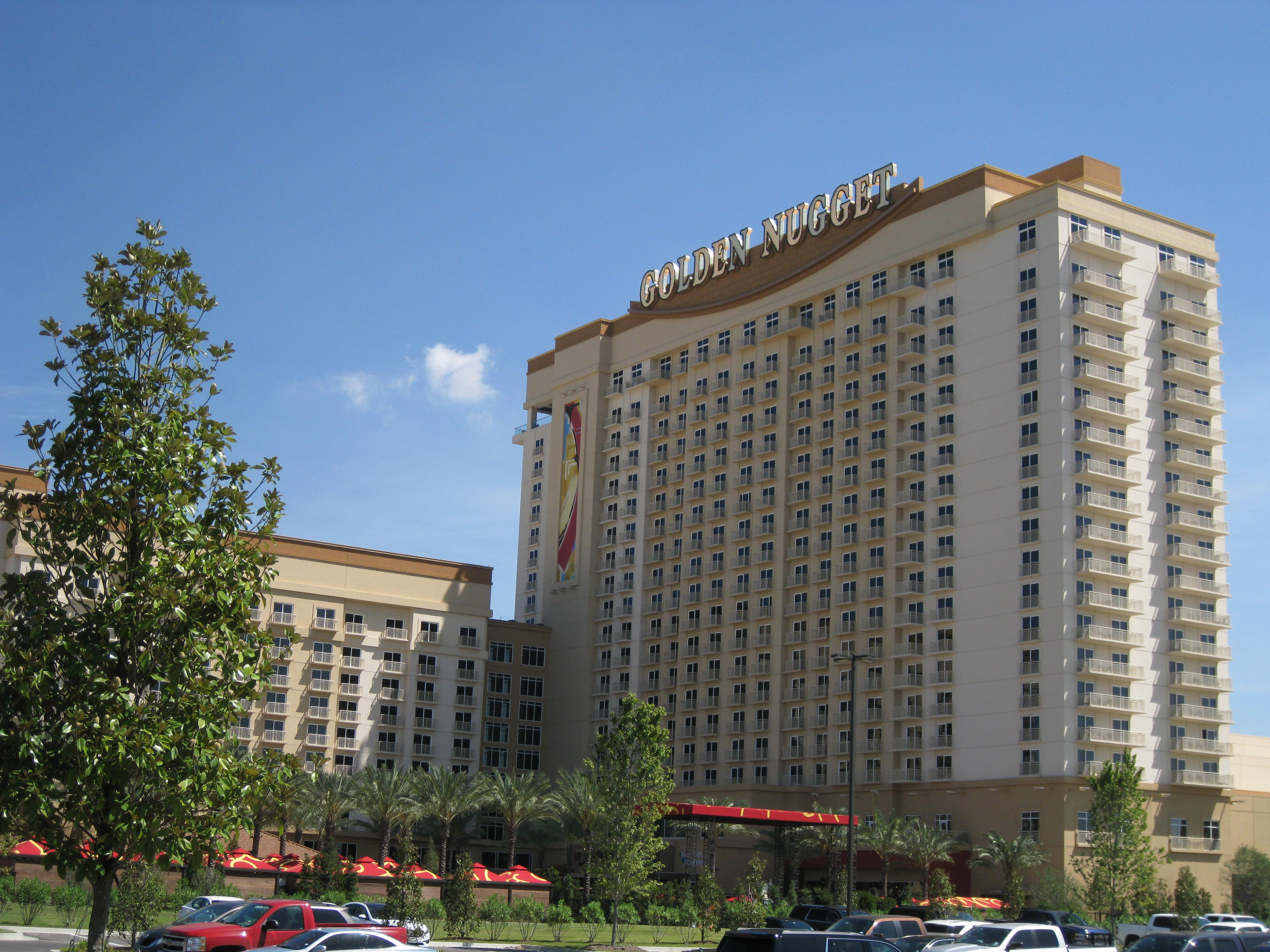
Golden Nugget Resort Lake Charles

Golden Nugget Lake Charles offers more than a dozen restaurants and bars, including a number of Landry's-owned restaurants – Landry's Seafood, Vic & Anthony's Steakhouse, Saltgrass Steak House, Cadillac Bar & Grill, Grotto Ristorante, Lillie's Asian Cuisine, Claim Jumper Grill, The Buffet and others. The resort is also home to Louisiana's first Blue Martini, a Florida-based cocktail lounge.

=== Golf ===
The 242-acre resort is also home to an 18-hole championship golf course, with driving range, club house, pro shop and dining room.

== See also ==
- List of casinos in Louisiana
