= Golden Nugget Laughlin =

Casino hotel in Nevada, United States

Coordinates: 35°9′16″N 114°34′23″W

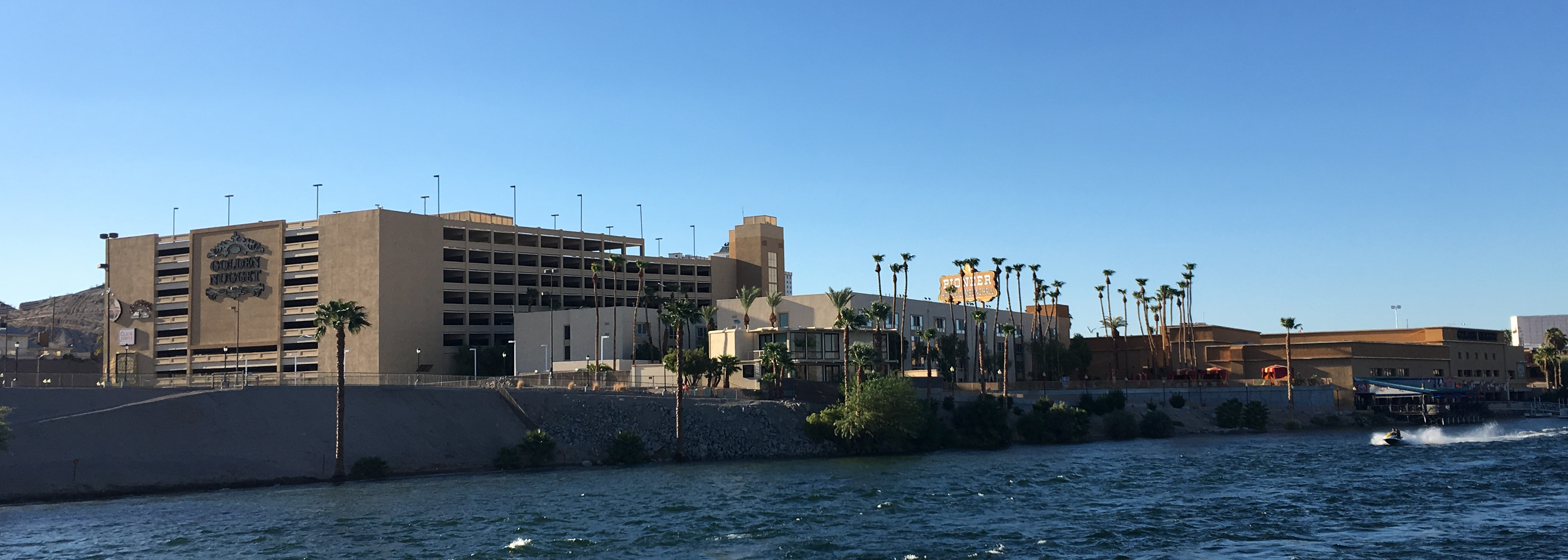
- The property as seen from the Colorado River in 2018
- Interactive map of Golden Nugget Laughlin
- Location: Laughlin, Nevada, U.S.; 2300 South Casino Drive
- Opened: 1967; 59 years ago
- Theme: Gold rush and Tropical
- No. of rooms: 300
- Gaming space: 34,023 sq ft (3,160.8 m^{2})
- Notable restaurants: Bubba Gump Shrimp Company; Claim Jumper; Saltgrass Steak House
- Owner: Landry's, Inc.
- Previous names: Nevada Club
- Website: goldennugget.com/laughlin

The Golden Nugget Laughlin (formerly the Nevada Club) is a hotel and casino located on the banks of the Colorado River in Laughlin, Nevada. It is owned and operated by Landry's, Inc. It offers a number of restaurants, 300 guest rooms and suites, a casino floor, and meeting spaces. The Golden Nugget offers water taxi service from Bullhead City, Arizona, on the opposite side of the river.

Restaurants at the Golden Nugget include Bubba Gump Shrimp Company, Claim Jumper, Saltgrass Steak House and Bean and Bread.

== History ==
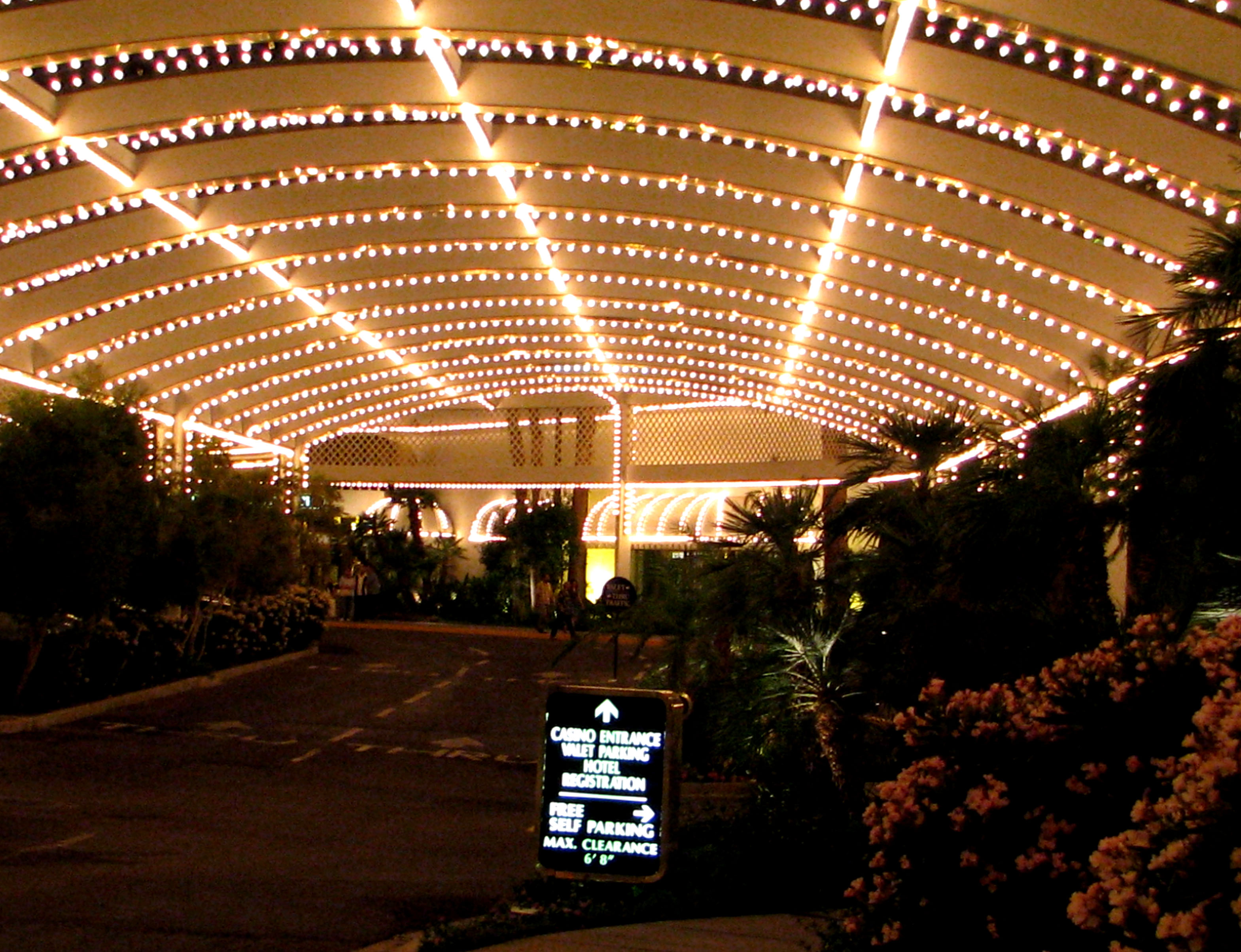
The porte cochere at the front of the property

The property was previously known as the Nevada Club. In 1986, the resort underwent a major renovation. In 1988, the Del Webb Corporation sold the Nevada Club to Golden Nugget Inc. for $40 million, and it was renamed as the Golden Nugget Laughlin. The 300-room hotel was added to the property in 1992, along with a parking garage, new restaurants, and tropical theming, including an indoor rainforest.

In 2004, it was acquired by Poster Financial Group. On May 31, 2005, it was acquired by Landry’s, which was purchasing the Golden Nugget Las Vegas at the same time. Rooms underwent renovation in 2006.

In the years since Landry’s acquired Golden Nugget Las Vegas and Laughlin, three additional Golden Nugget resorts have been developed in Atlantic City, New Jersey, Biloxi, Mississippi and Lake Charles, Louisiana.
