= Downtown Aquarium =

Downtown Aquarium may refer to either of two public aquariums owned and operated by Landry's Restaurants, Inc.

- Downtown Aquarium, Denver
- Downtown Aquarium, Houston
