= Strip House =

Coordinates: 40°44′3.6″N 73°59′36.4″W

- Interactive map of Strip House

Restaurant information
- Established: 2000; 26 years ago
- Food type: Steak
- Website: www.striphouse.com

Strip House is a privately owned American fine-dining chain of steakhouses, with locations in New York City and Las Vegas.

== History and management ==
The original Strip House was opened in New York City in 2000 by Restaurateurs Peter, Penny, and Mathew Glazier of The Glazier Group. The kitchens were overseen by Executive Chef John Schenk.

In 2010, the Glazier Group filed for Chapter 11 bankruptcy protection after failing to make an agreement with its lenders.

In 2011, New York restaurant owner BR Guest Hospitality purchased the brand and restaurants in Manhattan and Las Vegas, while The Glazier Group maintained the remaining eateries. The Glazier-operated Houston location closed in July 2012.

Landry's, Inc. acquired BR Guest Hospitality in 2016, including all of its restaurants.

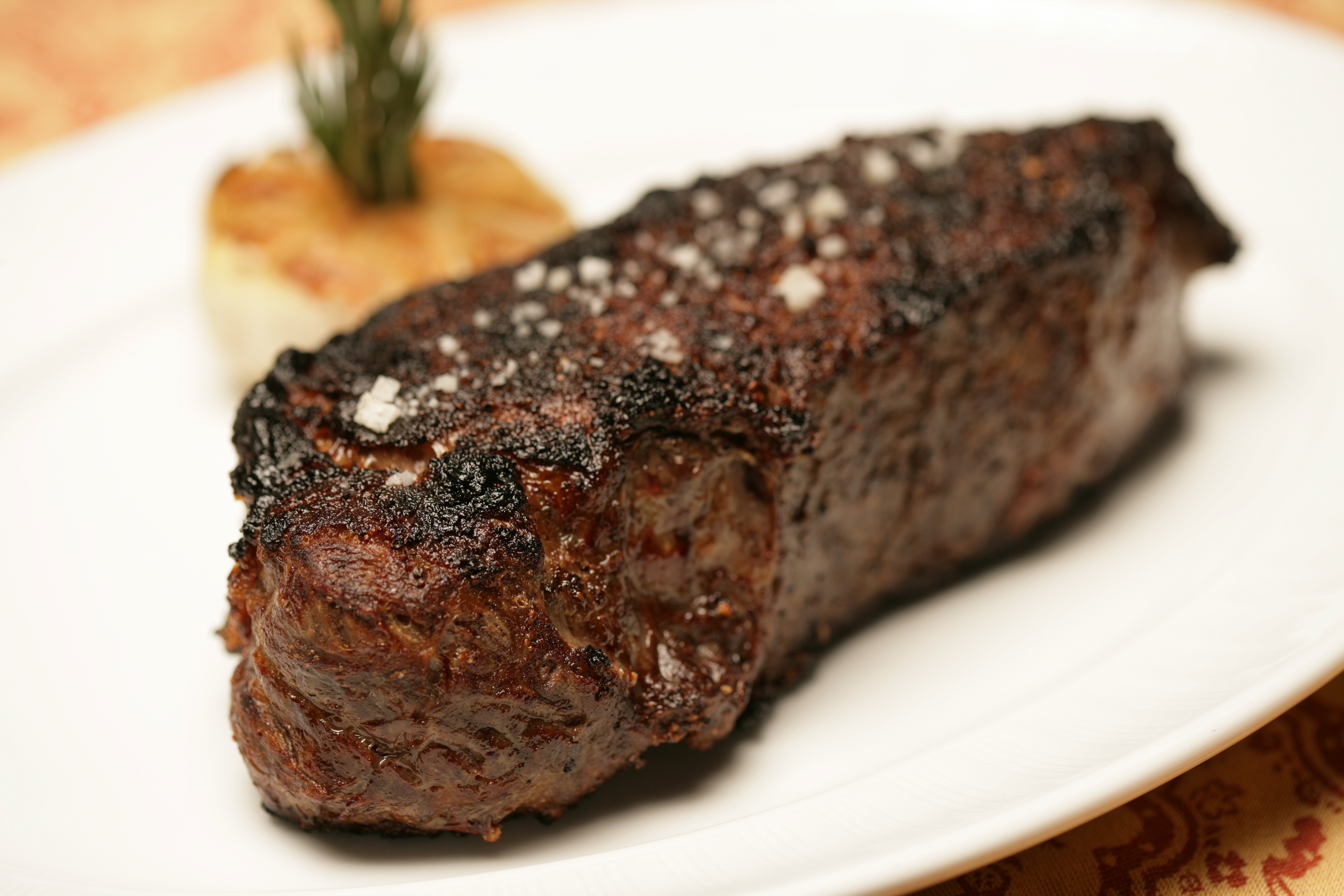
The signature New York Strip Steak

== Interior ==
All Strip House restaurants were designed by David Rockwell of the Rockwell Group. The interior features a collection of Studio Manassé (de) portraits of burlesque stars from the 1920s.

== See also ==
- List of restaurants in New York City
- List of steakhouses
