= Houlihan's =

Casual dining chain founded in 1972

Houlihan's Restaurant & Bar
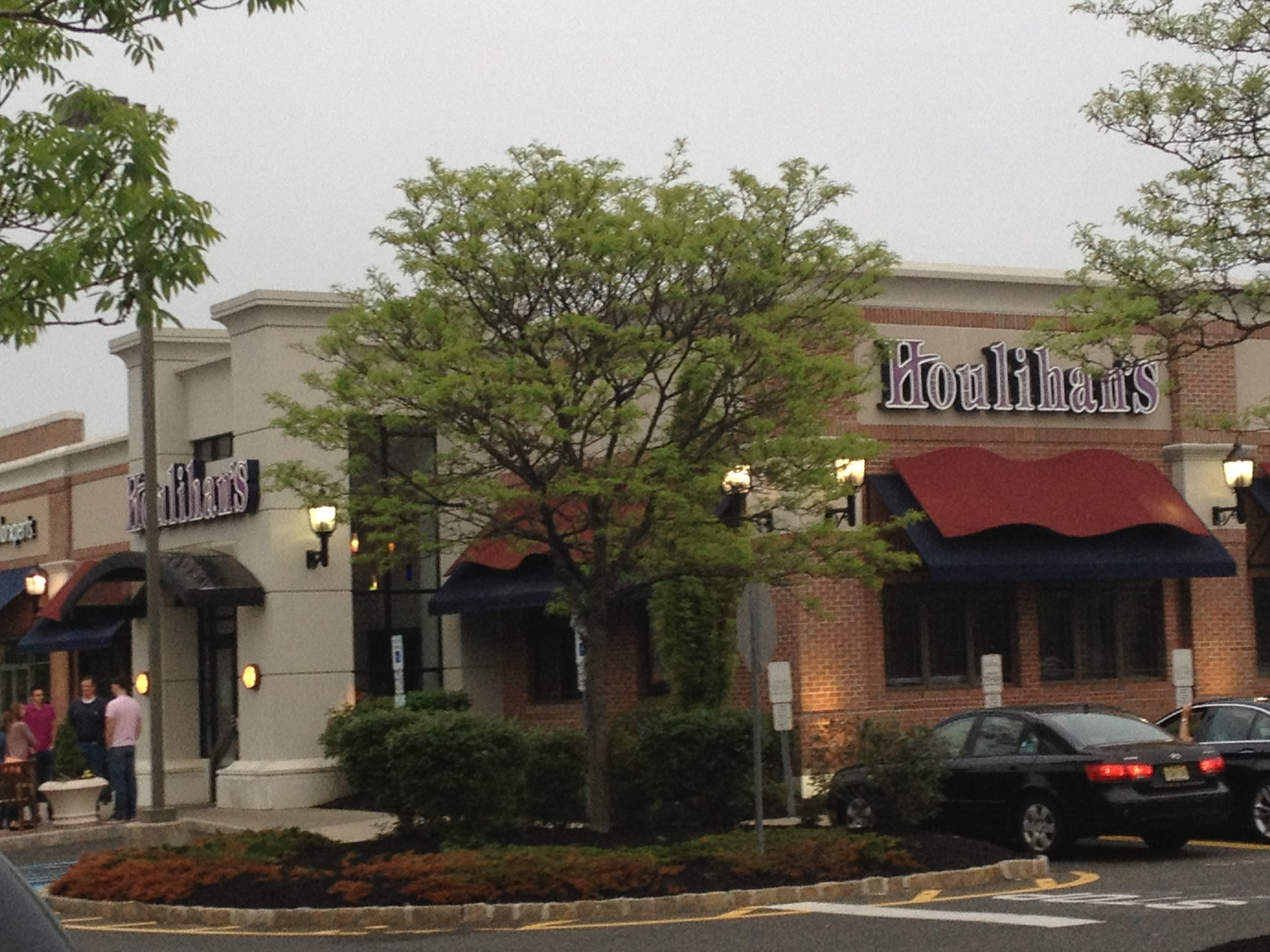
- A Houlihan's restaurant in Holmdel Township, New Jersey.
- Company type: Wholly owned subsidiary
- Industry: Restaurants
- Founded: 1972; 54 years ago in Kansas City, Missouri, U.S.
- Founders: Paul Robinson; Joe Gilbert
- Headquarters: Houston, Texas, U.S.
- Number of locations: 34 (2023)
- Products: Burgers; steaks; chicken; pasta; ribs; salads; seafood; soup
- Owner: Landry's, Inc.
- Website: houlihans.com

Houlihan's is an American casual restaurant and bar chain with locations operating throughout the country, 60% of which are franchised. It is headquartered in Leawood, Kansas. The first Houlihan's opened on April 1, 1972, in Kansas City's Country Club Plaza, and there are now 35 restaurants in 15 states. It was originally named Houlihan's Old Place because it was first located in the space of Houlihans Clothing Store.

Houlihan's is privately owned by Fertitta Entertainment, who bought HRI, a company that developed and owned several restaurant concepts including Bristol Seafood Grill, Devon Seafood Grill, and J. Gilbert's Wood-Fired Steaks.

== History ==
Paul Robinson met Joe Gilbert in 1961. At that time Robinson was manager of the Golden Ox restaurant in Kansas City's West Bottoms (and creator of Inn at the Landing, which opened in 1960 at the Landing shopping center at 63rd and Troost) and Gilbert was the creator of the Four Winds restaurant at the Kansas City downtown airport. The two men formed the Gilbert-Robinson restaurant firm, and they opened a number of successful restaurants including Plaza III Steakhouse at the Country Club Plaza in 1963 and Gilbert & Robinson's (later renamed Sam Wilson's) on 103rd Street in Overland Park. Several years later, Gilbert-Robinson looked into expanding Plaza III into the space being vacated next door by men's clothing store Tom Houlihan's. Instead of expanding Plaza III, the restaurant partners decided to create a new casual restaurant. During construction, they couldn't come up with a name for the new restaurant, and people kept referring to it as Tom Houlihan's place. As a result, they decided to call the new restaurant Houlihan's Old Place. Gilbert-Robinson gained Tom Houlihan's permission to use the name, and they told him that a table would be reserved for no one else but him in the middle of the dining room every day for the rest of his life. The table included a brass plaque with Tom's name on it; however, Tom Houlihan never set foot in the restaurant. Houlihan's Old Place opened on April 1, 1972. The chain briefly held the naming rights to Tampa Stadium, home of the NFL's Tampa Bay Buccaneers in the late 1990s before the team moved out of the stadium.

As a result of the early success of the original Houlihan's Old Place, Gilbert-Robinson quickly embarked on a plan of nationwide expansion. A second location, in the French Quarter of New Orleans, was opened in July 1973. The third location was opened in Atlanta in December 1974, and the fourth location was opened in Des Peres, Missouri, in March 1975.

In November 2002, Houlihan's announced that its original location at Kansas City's Country Club Plaza would close by the end of the year. The closing was announced because the landlord, Highwoods Realty LP, chose not to renew the lease. Highwoods Realty is a unit of Highwoods Properties Inc. of Raleigh, North Carolina, which owns most of the retail real estate in the heart of the Country Club Plaza. A spokesperson for Highwoods released a statement indicating that "the time was right to bring a new concept into our restaurant mix here on the Plaza." Houlihan's announced that it would relocate its Plaza location to a vacant space on 53rd Street in nearby Fairway, Kansas, in January 2003. At the time of the move, Houlihan's Restaurants, Inc. owned 48 restaurants in 15 states, including 34 of its Houlihan's branded restaurants.

Since January 2006, private equity firm Goldner Hawn Johnson Morrison has maintained a majority ownership stake in Houlihan's Restaurants, Inc. In May 2006, Houlihan's debuted its new "Houlihan's of the 21st Century" prototype design. The new restaurant designs featured new architecture, interior design, uniforms, music, menu format, patio-style dining, and a redesign to its spacious bar area. Houlihan's also announced a new strategic growth plan to open more corporate locations and limit franchise deals to highly experienced, "cream of the crop" market developers. In 2007, 92 Houlihan's restaurants operated throughout the United States, of which 31 were corporate-owned and 61 were franchised. By 2012, Houlihan's Restaurants, Inc. still owned 31 Houlihan's restaurants; however, franchised locations fell to 48 Houlihan's restaurants.

On November 14, 2019, the restaurant chain's holding company, HRI Holding Corp., and 38 affiliated companies filed bankruptcy in the United States District Court for the District of Delaware. According to the company's chief restructuring officer, Matthew Manning, the company is struggling due to a shifting labor market, unfavorable leases, and costly third-party delivery services (such as Postmates). The company intends to use the bankruptcy process to conduct an orderly sale of the restaurants. Landry’s, a Houston-based restaurant group that operates Joe’s Crab Shack, Rainforest Cafe, and Morton’s steakhouses, has offered to pay $40 million to keep the company from bankruptcy.

On December 31, 2025, the last Long Island location closed its doors in Farmingdale, NY.
