= B.R. Guest =

Fine-dining restaurants

B.R. Guest (stylized as "BR Guest") is a collection of fine-dining restaurants owned by Landry's, Inc. By 2015, BR Guest owned 15 large Manhattan places, including five branches of Dos Caminos, two Strip House steak joints, Blue Water Grill and Ruby Foo's.

== Business model ==
Opened in 1987, Steve Hanson signed a partnership deal with Barry Sternlicht, CEO of Starwood Capital Group, as part of its Starwood Opportunity Fund 7 in 2007. The transaction valued BR Guest between $150 million and $250 million.

In August 2010 BR Guest welcomed Alexandre Gaudelet to the team as its new Chief Operating Officer.

In November 2016, BR Guest was sold to Landry's, Inc., the operator of many casinos and restaurants including Bubba Gump Shrimp, the Rainforest Cafe, and Golden Nugget Casino.

== Appearance in the Epstein files ==
B.R. Guest appears in the 2026 DOJ document release of files relating to Jeffrey Epstein. A keyword search on the DOJ's archive as of February 8th, 2026 yields 130 results for "B.R. Guest", many of which appear to be Monthly Manager Planning Schedules for the Blue Water Grill. Additionally, there are emails between Executive Assistants discussing meetings and coordination between Epstein and President Stephen Hanson. One document in the files shows that after a meeting in September 2012, Hanson's assistant returned some test results that Epstein had requested for a sample of beef jerky.
