= Vic & Anthony's Steakhouse =

American restaurant chain

- Industry: Restaurant / Steakhouse
- Founded: 2002; 24 years ago in Houston, Texas
- Headquarters: Houston, Texas, U.S.
- Key people: Tilman J. Fertitta (President, CEO & sole owner)
- Products: Steaks, seafood, wine
- Parent: Landry's, Inc.
- Website: www.vicandanthonys.com

Vic & Anthony's is an American steakhouse restaurant chain with locations in Downtown Houston, and inside the Golden Nugget Casinos in Las Vegas, Atlantic City and Lake Charles. Vic & Anthony's is owned and operated by Landry's, Inc.

== History ==
In the early 2000s, Landry's, Inc. founder, president and CEO Tilman J. Fertitta travelled across the country with his father Vic Fertitta, visiting steakhouses with the intention of opening a new one in Houston. In 2002, Fertitta opened Vic & Anthony's in Downtown Houston, across the street from Daikin Park, the home of Major League Baseball's Houston Astros.

== Dining ==
The AAA listing for the restaurant describes its atmosphere as "upscale". Dress code is business or dressy casual. All four locations are open for dinner, and the New York location is open for lunch Monday through Friday. The Houston location is only open for lunch on Fridays, when Executive Concept Chef Carlos Rodriguez features a range of burgers. The Houston Rockets’ guard James Harden frequents the restaurants after home games.
