= Landry's =

American restaurant company

Landry's, Inc.
- Type: Private
- Industry: Hospitality; Gaming; Restaurant
- Founded: April 2, 1980; 46 years ago in Katy, Texas, United States
- Founders: Bill and Floyd Landry
- Headquarters: Houston, Texas, U.S.
- Number of locations: 471 total properties (Note: 460 restaurants, 1 pleasure pier, 1 theme park, 3 aquariums, and 6 other real estate properties) (2021)
- Key people: Tilman Fertitta (owner)
- Products: Casual dining, Fine dining, Casino games, Entertainment destinations, Resorts
- Revenue: ▲$3 billion (2021)
- Owner: Tilman Fertitta
- Number of employees: 58,000 (2021)
- Subsidiaries: B.R. Guest
- Website: landrysinc.com

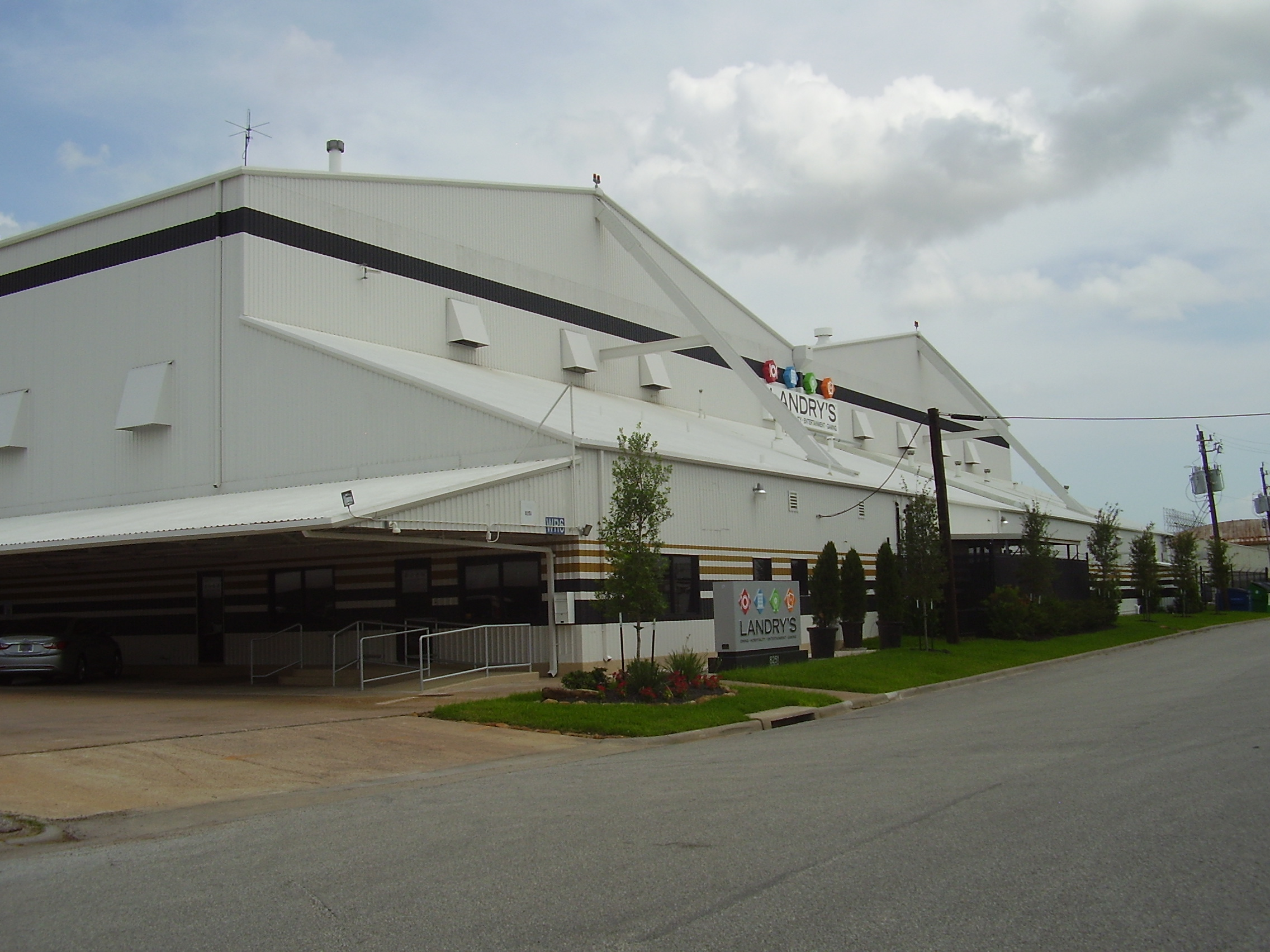
Landry's Hangar – Hobby Airport, Houston

Landry's, Inc. is a privately held American multi-brand dining, hospitality, entertainment, and gambling corporation headquartered in Houston, Texas. Landry's, Inc. owns and operates more than 600 restaurants, hotels, casinos, and entertainment destinations in 35 U.S. states and the District of Columbia. The company also owns and operates numerous international locations. The company is owned by former president & CEO Tilman Fertitta.

The first Landry's Seafood restaurant opened in Texas in 1980. While many patrons assumed it was named for Dallas Cowboys coach Tom Landry, it was not; Bill and Floyd Landry were the original owners. They had started opening restaurants in the Houston area in the 1970s.

== History ==
Brothers Bill and Floyd Landry and other partners from their hometown of Lafayette, Louisiana, began opening authentic Cajun restaurants in the Houston area in the 1970s. These included Willie G’s (named for their father), near The Galleria, and the first Landry's Seafood on the far west side of the city. By 1986, nearly all of the partners wanted to sell their shares. They found a willing buyer in Tilman Fertitta, who paid US$400,000 on December 31, 1986, for a controlling interest in the company. The remaining partner, Denis Wilson, was bought out for $850,000. He received $250,000 upfront, but had to spend $120,000 in legal fees to eventually collect the remaining $600,000 from Fertitta.

Fertitta became CEO and quickly began standardizing the appearance and menus of his restaurants; he removed the Cajun spicing from most dishes and scrubbed away the unique interior of Willie G's. He took the company public in 1993, with a valuation of $30 million.

Under Fertitta, the company expanded. In 2010, already the majority shareholder, Fertitta acquired all outstanding shares of company stock, gaining sole control and ownership. By 2011, the company's value had risen to more than $1.7 billion.

=== Acquisitions and growth ===
==== 1990s ====
Throughout the 1990s, Landry's, Inc., expanded, developing and acquiring restaurant, entertainment, hospitality, and gaming businesses. In 1994, Landry's, Inc., acquired Joe's Crab Shack. In 2006, Landry's, Inc., sold Joe's Crab Shack, which had grown to more than 120 locations, to J.H. Whitney & Company. During the decade, the company acquired several other restaurants, including The Crab House and Cadillac Bar.

Landry's, Inc., expanded its hospitality and entertainment divisions in 1996, acquiring the San Luis Resort, a 32-acre beachfront resort on Galveston Island's historic Seawall Boulevard and built on top of the former Fort Crockett. In 2004, Landry's, Inc., partnered with the city of Galveston to open a 140,000 square foot convention center, the Galveston Island Convention Center at the San Luis Resort. In 2003, the company acquired the adjacent Holiday Inn Resort Galveston – On the Beach. In 2004, the adjacent Hilton Galveston Island Resort was acquired. The San Luis Resort includes 700 guest rooms, ten restaurants, and 200,000 square feet of event space.

In 1998, the company developed the 35-acre Kemah Boardwalk, with a hotel, a marina, more than ten restaurants, and dozens of midway games, amusement rides, and attractions. The company's hospitality division also includes The Westin Houston Downtown in Downtown Houston and the Boardwalk Inn on the Kemah Boardwalk.

==== 2000s ====
After 2000, Landry's, Inc., continued to grow. In 2000, the company acquired Rainforest Cafe, a collection of jungle-inspired restaurants and retail villages. In 2002, the company acquired three national seafood restaurants: Saltgrass Steak House, Chart House, and Muer Restaurants.

In 2003, the company opened the Downtown Aquarium, a 20-acre entertainment complex in Houston with an aquarium, a restaurant built around a 150,000-gallon, floor-to-ceiling centerpiece aquarium, a bar, banquet facilities, amusement rides, and midway games. A train carries guests into a tunnel running through a 250,000-gallon shark tank. Other Aquarium restaurants have since opened in Denver, Nashville, and on the Kemah Boardwalk in Texas.

In 2005, the company acquired Golden Nugget Hotel & Casinos, with locations in Las Vegas and Laughlin, Nevada. Landry's, Inc., has since opened three additional locations in Atlantic City, New Jersey, Biloxi, Mississippi and Lake Charles, Louisiana.

On October 14, 2008, T-Rex Cafe, a prehistoric dinosaur jungle themed restaurant chain in Disney Springs at Walt Disney World Resort in Orlando, Florida, location was opened to the public, it is themed after The Rite of Spring segment by Igor Stravinsky is performed by Leopold Stokowski and the Philadelphia Symphony Orchestra in the 1940 Walt Disney's animated film Fantasia (1940).

==== 2010s ====
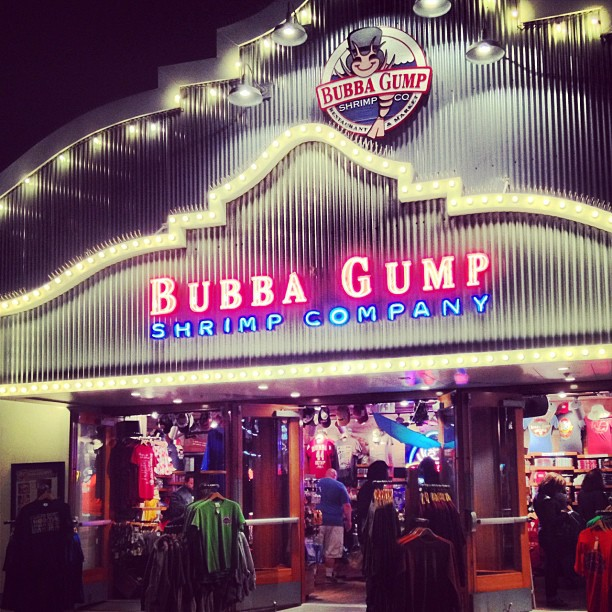
Landry acquired Bubba Gump Shrimp Company in 2010.

In 2010, Landry's, Inc., acquired three new restaurants: Bubba Gump Shrimp Company, a collection of seafood restaurants themed on the movie Forrest Gump, The company also acquired Claim Jumper, a national chain of family restaurants. The Oceanaire, a national collection of seafood restaurants, is known for flying in fresh fish daily.

In 2011, Landry's bought two more restaurants – McCormick & Schmick's Seafood & Steaks and Morton's The Steakhouse. In 2012, the company expanded its entertainment division with the opening of the Galveston Island Historic Pleasure Pier.

In 2013, Landry's acquired Mastro's restaurants. The company has developed and acquired a collection of restaurants called Landry's Signature Group, which include Vic & Anthony's, Grotto, Brenner's Steakhouse, Brenner's on the Bayou, La Griglia, and Willie G's Seafood & Steaks. In 2016, Landry's acquired the BR Guest restaurant brand.

In August 2017, Landry's re-acquired Joe's Crab Shack restaurants from Ignite Restaurant Group, which had filed for bankruptcy protection on June 6, 2017. Landry's had sold Joe's to Ignite's predecessor in 2006. The Ignite group's Brick House Tavern, and Tap restaurants were also included in the deal.

In September 2019, Landry's bought Seattle-based Restaurants Unlimited Inc, adding Skates on the Bay, Portland City Grill, Manzana Grill, Palisade, Cutters Crabhouse, Stanford's, Henry's Tavern, Kincaid's, Palomino Restaurant & Bar, and Portland Seafood Company to its portfolio.

Also in September 2019, Landry's acquired Del Frisco's Grille and Del Frisco's Double Eagle Steak Houses for around $650 million.

==== 2020s ====
In November 2024, Landry's acquired Keens Steakhouse for $30 million.

== Properties and subsidiaries ==
=== Hotels and casinos ===
==== Golden Nugget casinos ====
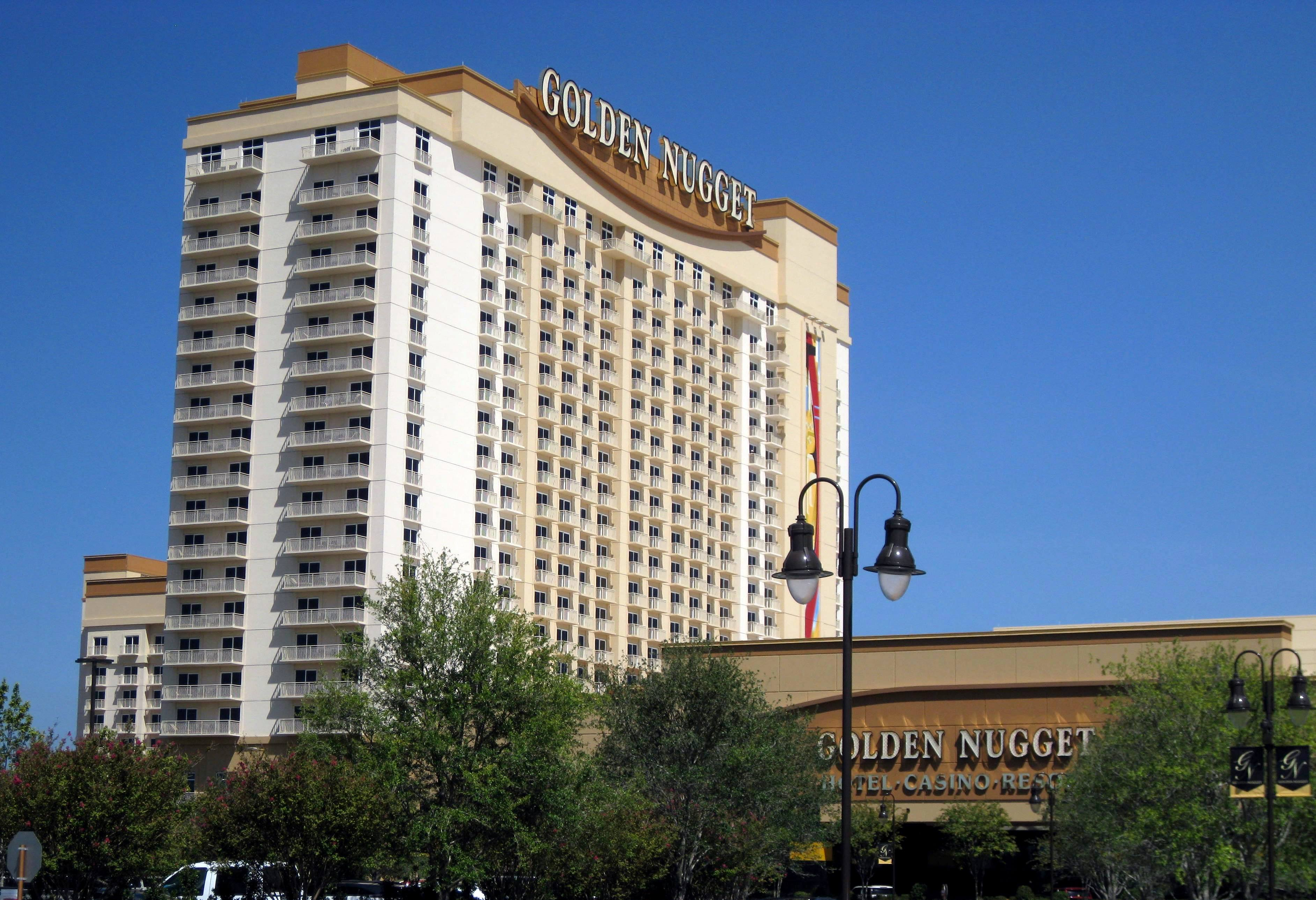
Golden Nugget Lake Charles in Lake Charles, Louisiana

- Golden Nugget Atlantic City
- Golden Nugget Biloxi
- Golden Nugget Danville
- Golden Nugget Cripple Creek, Colorado
- Golden Nugget Lake Charles
- Golden Nugget Las Vegas
- Golden Nugget Laughlin

==== Hotels ====
- Blue Water Inn - St. Clair, Michigan
- Huntting Inn - East Hampton, New York
- Boardwalk Inn - Kemah, Texas
- The Post Oak Hotel and Tower - Houston, Texas
- Post Oak Las Vegas - Las Vegas, Nevada (future)
- San Luis Resort - Galveston, Texas
  - The Villas at San Luis Resort

=== Online casino ===
Landry's, Inc. will assume ownership of a 60% stake in the online casino platform, Golden Nugget Online Casino as part of the deal to go public.

=== Restaurants ===
==== Fine dining ====
- Blue Fin
- Bristol Seafood Grill
- Chart House
- Del Frisco's
- Devon Seafood Grill
- J. Gilbert's Woodfired Steaks
- Kincaid's (CA and MN)
- Mastro's Restaurants
- Mitchell's Fish Market
- Morton's The Steakhouse
- The Oceanaire Seafood Room
- The Palm
- Strip House
- Vic & Anthony's Steakhouse

==== Casual restaurants ====
- Bubba Gump Shrimp Company
- Claim Jumper
- Houlihan's
- Joe's Crab Shack
- McCormick & Schmick's
- Rainforest Cafe
- Saltgrass Steak House

==== Notable single location restaurants ====
- Grand Concourse
- Jake's Famous Crawfish
- Skates on the Bay (Berkeley, CA)
- T-Rex Cafe
- Yak & Yeti
- Clinkerdagger

=== Entertainment properties ===
==== Amusement parks and boardwalks ====
- Kemah Boardwalk: The company owns a boardwalk in Kemah, Texas. The Kemah Boardwalk, a 60-acre Texas Gulf Coast theme park in Kemah, Texas, approximately 30 miles southeast of Downtown Houston, Texas. The Boardwalk is built entirely along the shores of Galveston Bay and Clear Lake, and is considered among the premier boardwalks in the United States. The complex is owned and operated by Landry's, Inc., and is home to more than ten restaurants; a collection of rides; midway games; attractions; a boutique hotel; a charter yacht; a 400-slip marina; and multiple shops. There is no charge to walk around on the boardwalk. Tickets for rides can be purchased individually, or all-day ride passes are available. Restaurants on the boardwalk include Landry's Seafood; Bubba Gump Shrimp Co.; Saltgrass Steak House; and Cadillac Bar.
- Galveston Island Historic Pleasure Pier: a Pleasure pier owned by Landry's in Galveston, Texas, United States. Opened in Summer 2012, it has 1 roller coaster, 15 rides, as well as carnival games and souvenir shops.

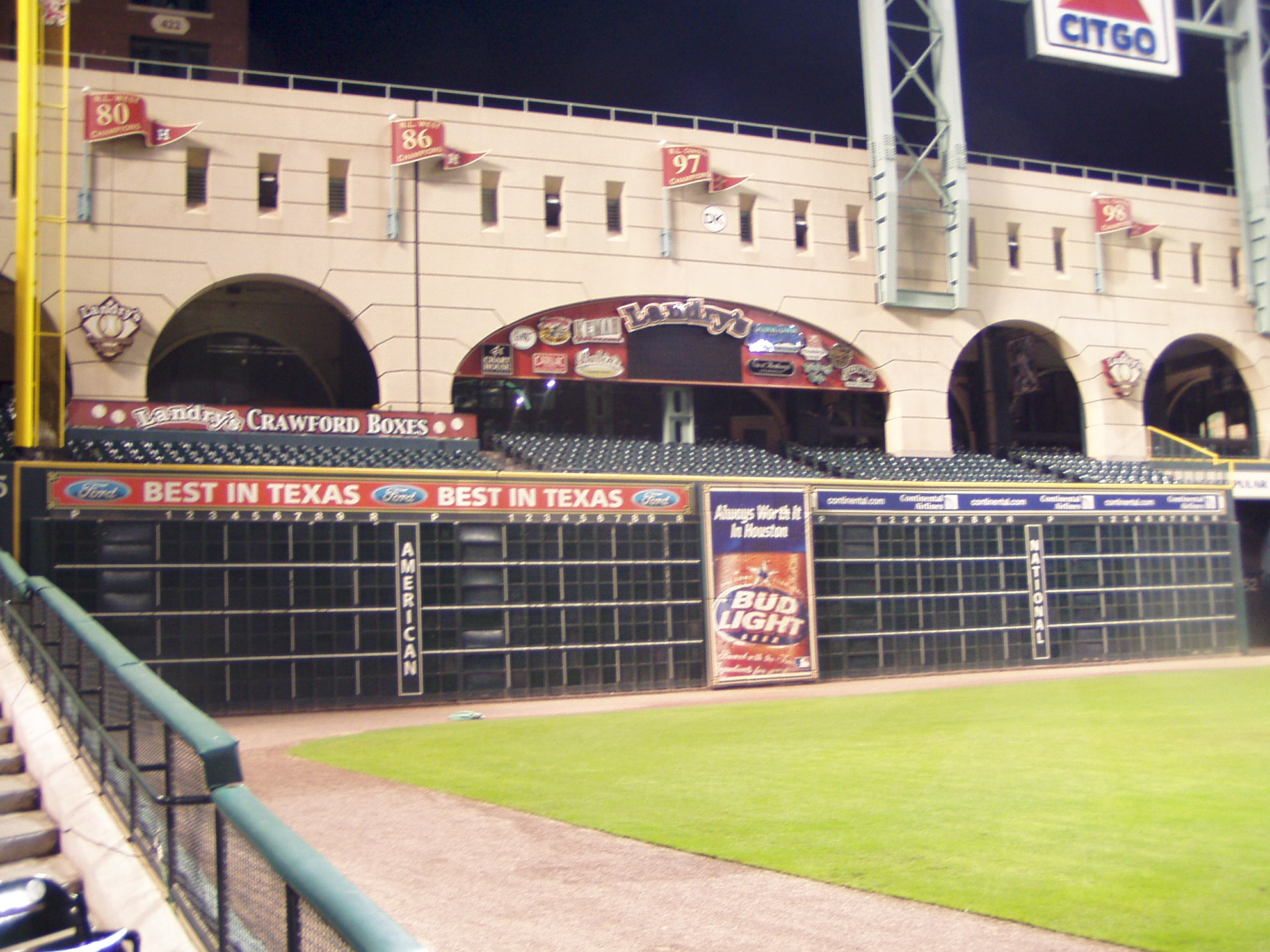
The Crawford Boxes

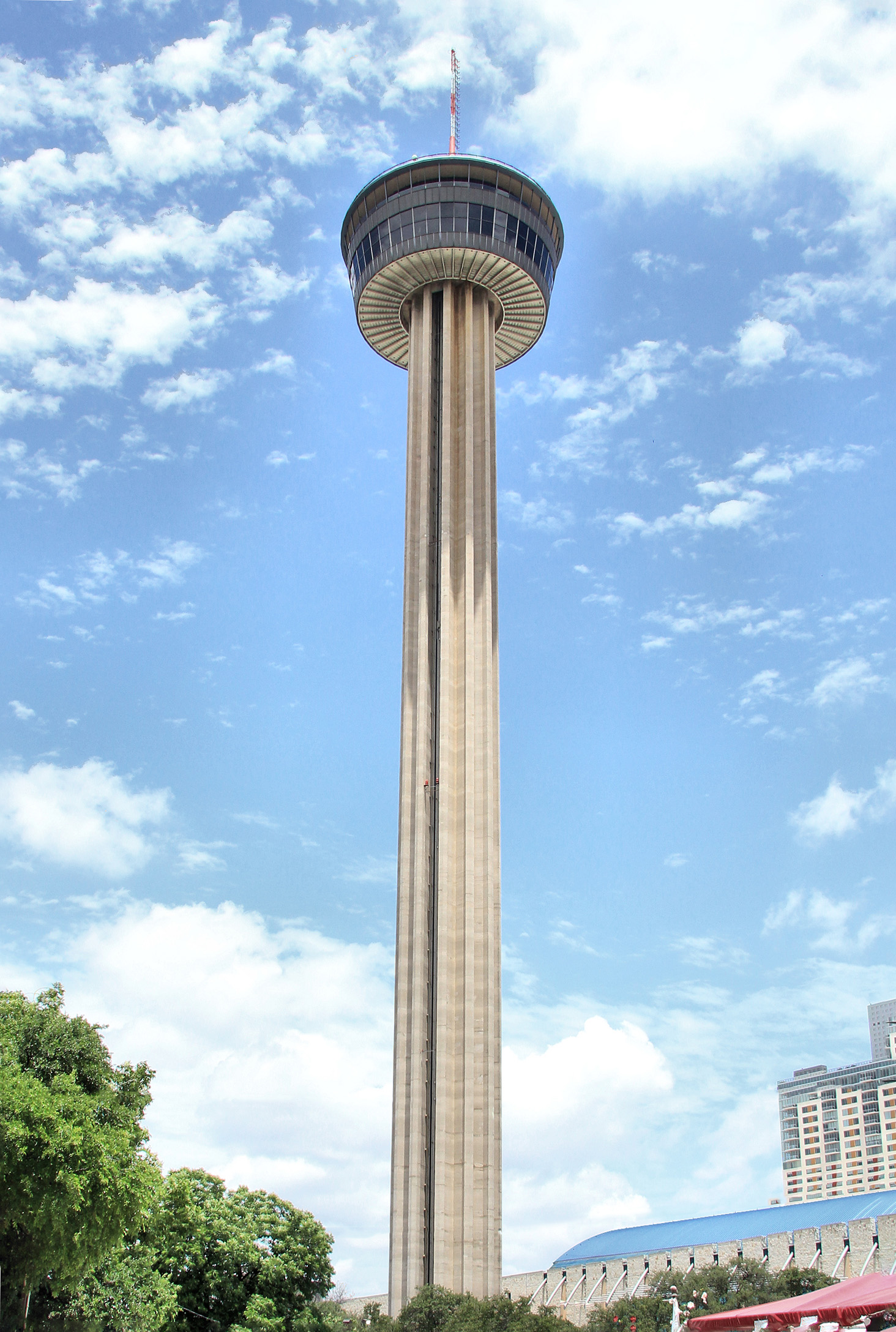
Landry's, Inc. operates the Tower of the Americas in San Antonio.

==== Other properties ====
Since the 1990s, Landry's has expanded to real estate holdings beyond dining and hospitality.

- The Post Oak: Fertitta broke grounds on a mixed-use skyscraper in Houston that will accommodate the company's headquarters. The building includes hotel rooms, residential rooms, and office buildings.
- Post Oak Motor Cars: The company owns and operates Post Oak Motor Cars, Ltd., the largest factory-authorized Rolls-Royce Motor Cars and Bentley Motors dealership on the Gulf Coast.
- Landry's Crawford Boxes: Landry's, Inc., owns the naming rights to the left field bleachers at Daikin Park, the home of Major League Baseball's Houston Astros. The Landry's Crawford Boxes are so named because they parallel Downtown Houston's Crawford Street. Any fan catching a home run receives a gift card to Landry's, Inc. restaurants.
- Tower of the Americas (originally built for HemisFair '68): Landry's, Inc., operates Tower of the Americas, a 750-foot San Antonio, Texas, landmark. At the top of the tower, guests can dine at Chart House Restaurant. Other attractions include summer concert series; a 4D Texas ride; and an observation level.

=== Aquariums ===
Landry's, Inc., owns aquariums in Houston, Denver, Nashville, and Kemah, Texas. All aquariums contain restaurants branded in Landry's Aquarium subsidiary.

- Downtown Aquarium, Houston: a public aquarium and restaurant located in Houston, Texas, United States, that was developed from two Houston landmarks: Fire Station No. 1 and the Central Waterworks Building. The aquarium is located on a 6-acre (2.4 ha) site at 410 Bagby St. in downtown Houston. It houses over 200 species of aquatic animals in 500,000 US gallons (1,900,000 L) of aquariums. The complex includes two restaurants, a bar, and banquet facilities. The Downtown Aquarium in Houston is owned and operated by Landry's, Inc., and accredited by the Association of Zoos and Aquariums (AZA).
- Downtown Aquarium, Denver: a public aquarium and restaurant located in Denver, Colorado, at the intersection of I-25 and 23rd Ave. The 107,000 square feet (9,900 m^{2}) main building sits on a 17-acre (6.9 ha) site adjacent to the South Platte River. Its freshwater and marine aquaria total approximately 1,000,000 US gallons (3,785,000 L), and exhibit a variety of fish and other animals. The Downtown Aquarium in Denver is owned and operated by Landry's Restaurants, Inc., and is the largest aquarium between Chicago and California. It is accredited by the Association of Zoos and Aquariums (AZA).
- Nashville: Landry's operates a 200,000 gallon Aquarium in Nashville that contains a variety of fish, sharks, and stingrays. The aquarium operated the Aquarium branded restaurants.
- Kemah, Texas: Inside the Kemah Boardwalk (also owned by Landry's, Inc.), the company operates an aquarium and restaurant.

=== Cruise ===
- Boardwalk FantaSea: A Houston area cruise line offering public and private cruise lines that travel through the Galveston Bay and the Gulf of Mexico.

== White tiger exhibit ==
On September 19, 2016, a consortium of parties, including the Animal Legal Defense Fund (ALDF), sent Landry's a notice of an intended lawsuit against it under the Endangered Species Act. The lawsuit notice concerned the alleged treatment and habitat conditions of four white tigers exhibited at the Downtown Aquarium, Houston. The ALDF complained that the four tigers, which are federally protected by the Endangered Species Act of 1973 (ESA), "are kept in deplorable conditions" at the aquarium. According to a press release provided by the ALDF:

For the last 12 years, Landry’s has deprived these four tigers ... of any access to sunlight, fresh air, or natural surfaces. These species-inappropriate living conditions violate the ESA ... At no point do the tigers have the opportunity to run, jump, or engage in the full range of their natural behaviors. ... "The dungeon-like conditions that the tigers are forced to endure at Houston's Downtown Aquarium harm their physical health and psychological wellbeing and deny them much that is natural and important to a tiger," says renowned big cat veterinarian Dr. Jennifer Conrad. "It is cruel to confine complex, roaming carnivores such as tigers to a tiny, dark, artificial, unenriched enclosure where they never see any daylight, much less bask in sunshine, and are at risk for serious long term, debilitating injuries from being forced to live on slippery, unyielding concrete their entire lives." ... By forcing these tigers to live in what amounts to a concrete dungeon, Landry's has profited financially, but caused the tigers serious mental and physical harm ... Retiring the tigers to a sanctuary will guarantee that the tigers may spend the rest of their lives in the species-appropriate conditions that they need and deserve.

Before the expiration of the 60-day notice period, Landry's sued the ALDF and its co-parties to the original lawsuit notice for defamation, business disparagement, tortious interference with prospective business relations, and abuse of process. In response, the ALDF filed a motion for the dismissal of the defamation lawsuit, citing Texas' anti-SLAPP law, which allows judges to dismiss meritless lawsuits filed against those who speak out about a "matter of public concern".

On February 22, 2017, Harris County District Judge Steven Kirkland dismissed the defamation lawsuit filed by Landry's and further ordered Landry's to pay $450,000 in penalties and an additional $174,000 in legal fees to deter the company from filing such lawsuits in the future. The decision to dismiss the defamation lawsuit by Landry's was affirmed on October 18, 2018, by the Fourteenth Court of Appeals of Texas, although the penalties sanctioned on Landry's were reduced.

== See also ==
- List of seafood restaurants
