= Joe's Crab Shack =

American restaurant chain

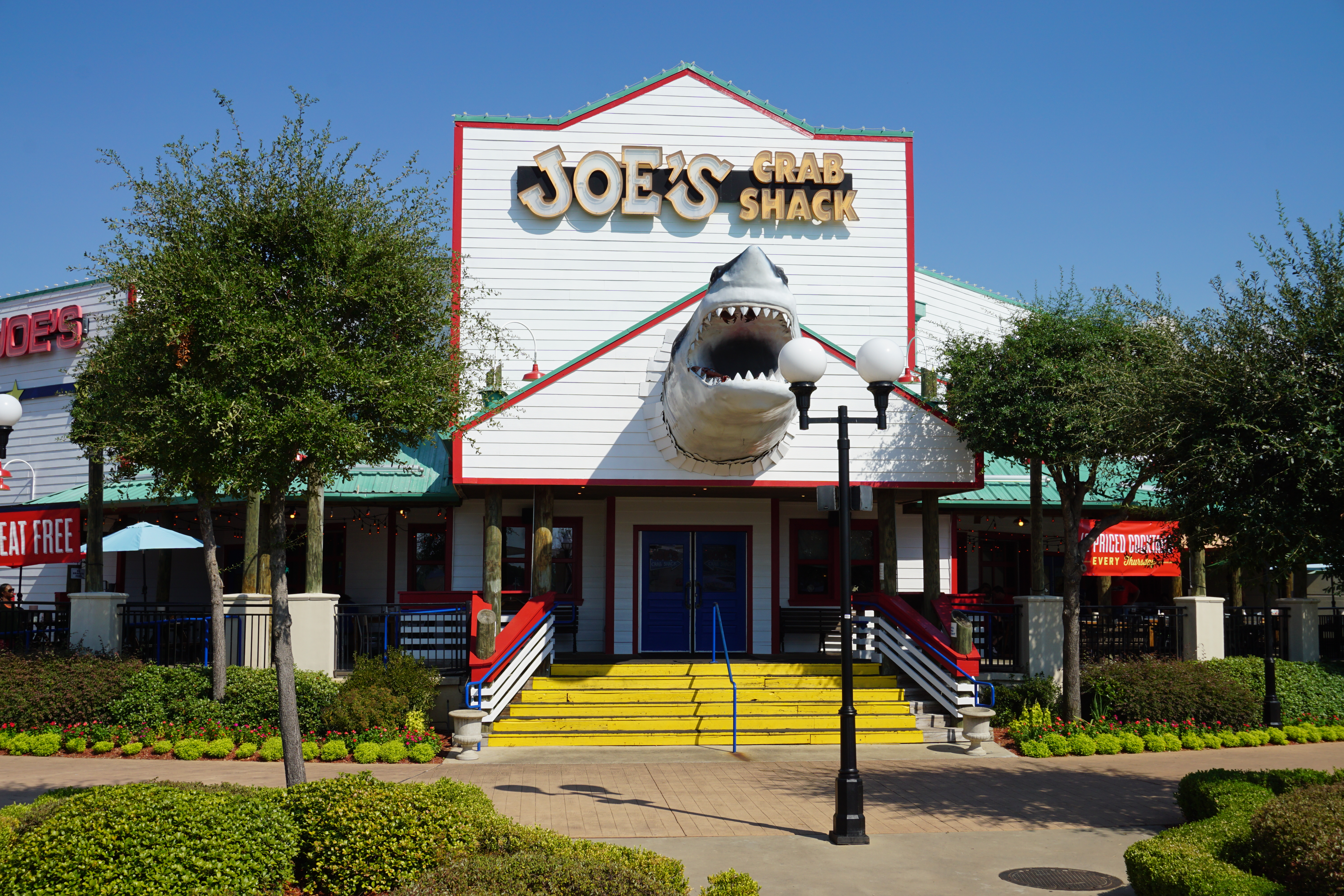
- A Joe's Crab Shack branch at the Louisiana Boardwalk in Bossier City, Louisiana
- Type: Wholly owned subsidiary
- Industry: Restaurants
- Founded: 1991; 35 years ago in Houston, Texas, U.S.
- Founder: Richard K. Park; Ed Newman
- Headquarters: Houston, Texas, U.S.
- Number of locations: 13
- Owner: Landry’s Restaurant, Inc.
- Website: joescrabshack.com

Joe's Crab Shack is an American chain of beach-themed seafood casual dining restaurants. Founded in Houston, Texas, the restaurant now operates locations all across the United States.

== History ==
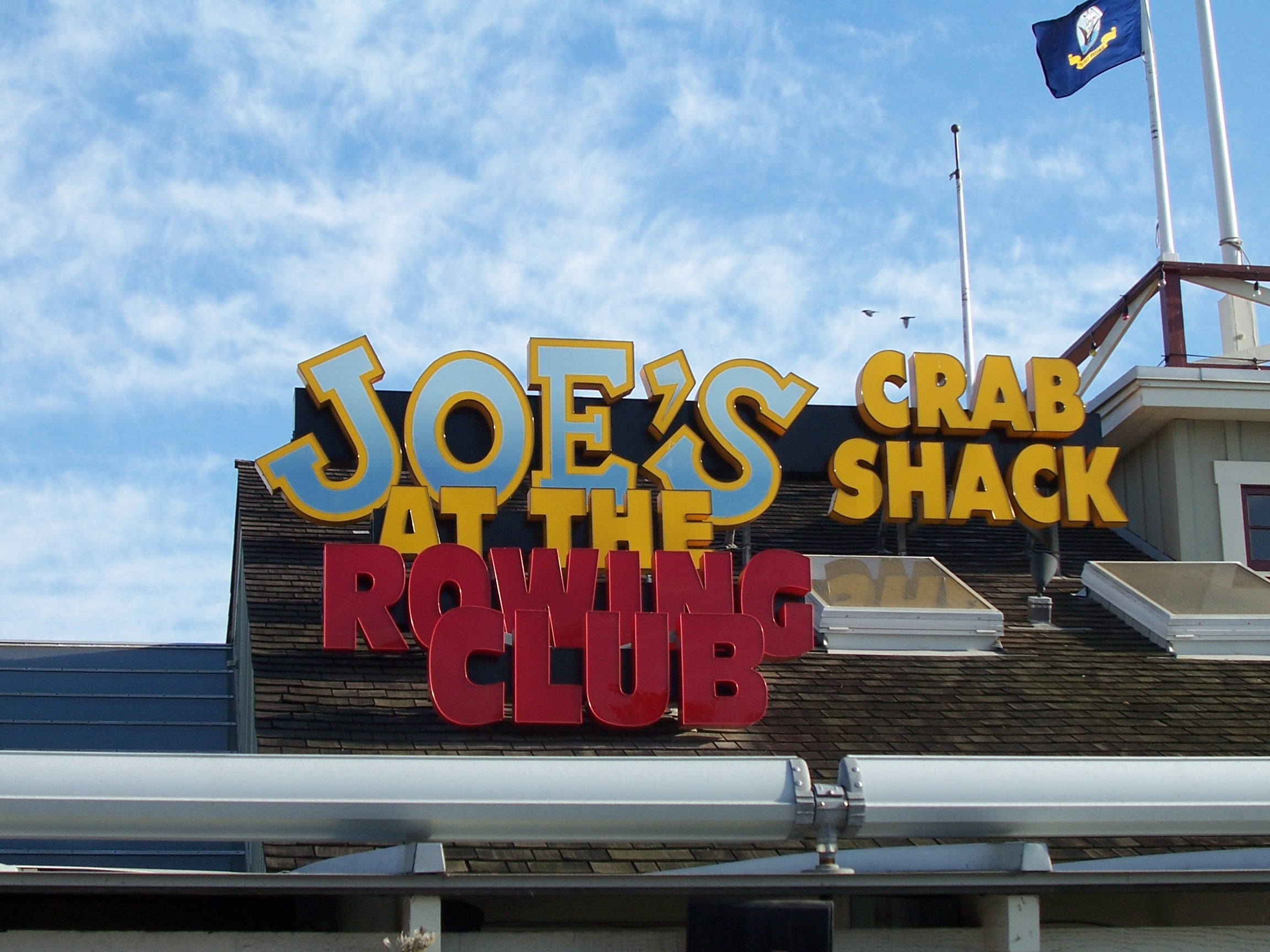
A Joe's Crab Shack branch in San Diego, California. The building was initially a rowing club and was later converted into the restaurant.

The first Joe's Crab Shack location was opened in Houston, Texas, in 1991 by Richard K. Park and Ed Newman. Landry's Restaurants, Inc., purchased the original Joe's in Houston in early 1994 to convert it into a Landry's Restaurant. By 1995 the chain had grown to three locations in Houston and one in Dallas.

On November 17, 2006, Joe's was sold to J.H. Whitney & Company, a privately held company, operating as JCS Holdings, LLC. The sales price was $192 million including the assumption of liabilities of $225 million.

JCS Holdings changed their name to Ignite Restaurant Group in April 2009 and operated the 130 existing Joe's and 26 Brickhouse Tavern and Tap restaurants. Ignite Restaurant Group went public in 2012. The company was headquartered on Westpark Drive near the Westchase District of Houston.

In March 2016, the Joe's location in Roseville, MN, was criticized for including a photo of the Texas execution by hanging of Joseph Burleson, a black man convicted of murder, as table decor. The photo included a cartoon bubble reading "All I said was that I didn't like the gumbo." The use of the photo was condemned by the NAACP and the city of Roseville. A spokesman for Joe's Crab Shack apologized. This restaurant along with others has since been closed when Ignite Restaurant Group filed bankruptcy in 2017.

Ignite Restaurant Group filed for bankruptcy protection on June 6, 2017, and was re-acquired by Landry's, Inc., in August 2017 at bankruptcy auction for $57 million.

In August 2017, the chain closed 40 locations in several states amid bankruptcy proceedings as Landry's prepared to take over. Landry's has plans to re-focus the chain, and then to grow it again.

As of October 2025, the chain had decreased its operations to 15 locations in 7 states.

== See also ==
- List of seafood restaurants
