= Chart House =

Seafood restaurant chain

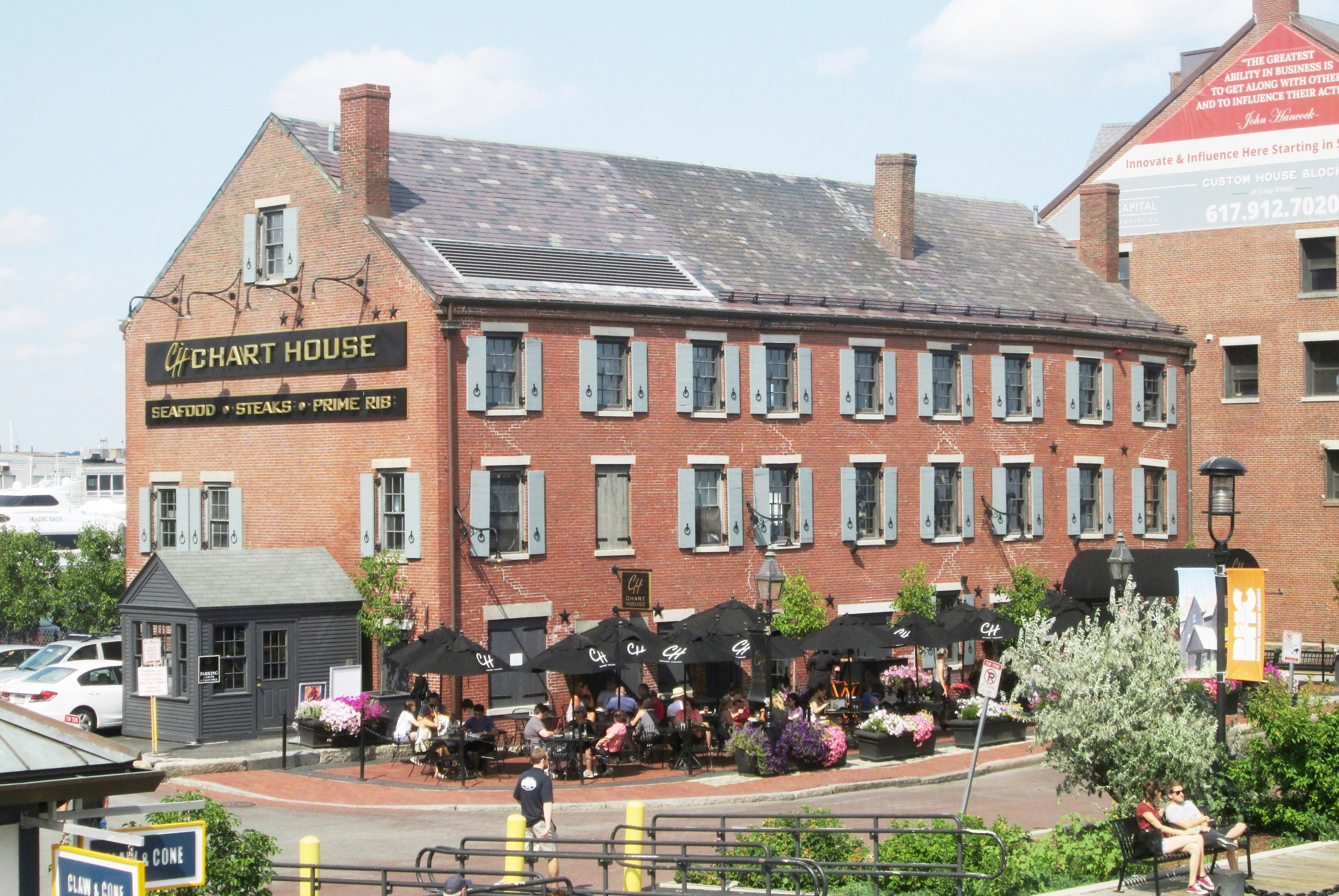
- The Chart House's location in Boston's Gardiner Building
- Industry: Restaurants
- Genre: Seafood
- Number of locations: 28 (2015)
- Owner: Landry's
- Website: Official website

Chart House is an American seafood restaurant chain owned by Landry's.

== Locations ==
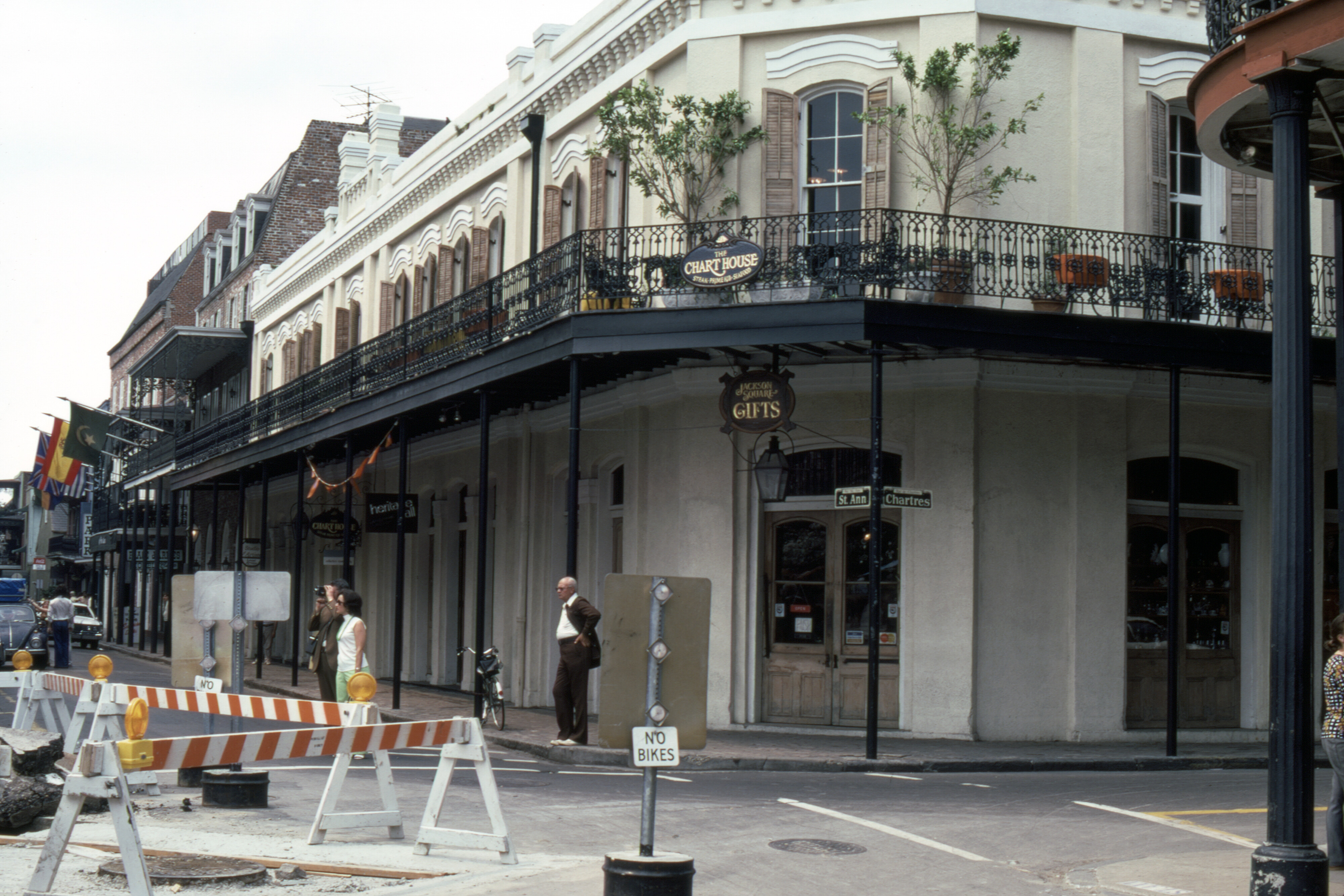
New Orleans location

As of 2015, there are 28 locations in the United States, including Boston, Massachusetts, and Portland, Oregon.

== Reception ==
Zoe Baillargeon included the Portland restaurant in Eater Portland's 2022 list of fifteen restaurants "where the views are as good as the food".
