= Downtown Aquarium (Houston) =

Aquarium in Houston, Texas, United States

Downtown Aquarium, Houston

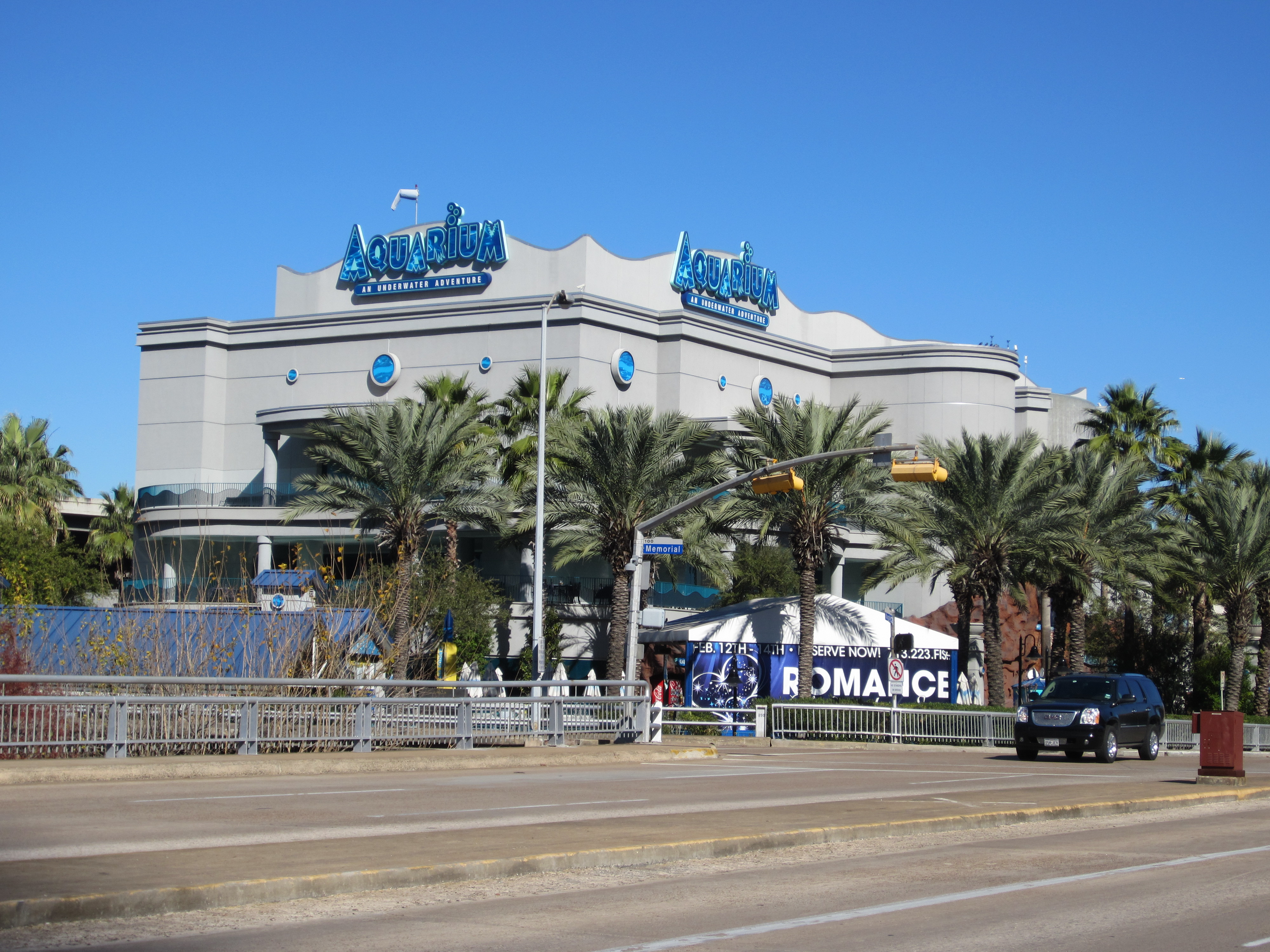
- Interactive map of Downtown Aquarium, Houston
- 29.764196°N 95.367374°W
- Date opened: 2003
- Location: Houston, Texas
- Land area: 6-acre (2.4 ha)
- No. of species: 200+
- Volume of largest tank: 200,000 US gallons (760,000 L)
- Total volume of tanks: 500,000 US gallons (1,900,000 L)
- Memberships: AZA
- Major exhibits: 8
- Website: www.downtownaquariumhouston.com

Downtown Aquarium is a for-profit aquarium and restaurant located in Houston, Texas, United States, United States. It is located on a 6-acre (2.4 ha) site at 410 Bagby Street in downtown Houston, developed from two landmarks: Fire Station No. 1 and the Central Waterworks Building. The venue houses over 200 species of aquatic animals in 500,000 US gallons (1,900,000 L) of aquariums. The complex includes two restaurants, a bar, and banquet facilities. It offers programs such as Marine Biologist for a Day, Zoologist for a Day, Sea Safari Camp, overnight stays and more. The education department works with school groups and conducts outreach programs.

The Downtown Aquarium in Houston is owned and operated by Landry's, Inc. and accredited by the Association of Zoos and Aquariums.

== History ==
In 1999, the City of Houston put out a request for proposals for the redevelopment of Fire Station No.1 in the 400 block of Bagby, and the nearby Central Waterworks plant. In mid-2000, Landry's plan was accepted over an alternate proposal by the Post/Cordish partnership. The Central Waterworks plant would be a shark and ray exhibition habitat. The main restaurant would be on the second floor of the old firehouse, which would remain intact while construction took place around it.

The Downtown Aquarium was opened in 2003.

In late 2015, a campaign targeting the aquarium's white tiger exhibit was launched by animal rights activists. The Downtown Aquarium rejected the criticism of the exhibit by stating that their "tigers receive exemplary animal care," and "our tiger exhibit has been accredited by AZA, and every year by the USDA. The Animal Legal Defense Fund has threatened to file a lawsuit if the aquarium does not close the exhibit and transfer the tigers to a sanctuary. In 2019, the Aquarium responded with the construction of a $4 million outdoor exhibit for the tigers.

== Aquarium Adventure exhibit ==
The Aquarium Adventure Exhibit in the main building consists of five main themed areas, plus the tiger habitat and interactive displays.

The Louisiana Swamp exhibit is home to animals from the marsh and bayous of the Gulf Coast, including alligators, turtles, tarpon, spotted gar, salamanders, catfish, and bullfrogs.

The shipwreck puts visitors inside the sunken hull of a 17th-century Spanish galleon where they can look, out to see living coral reefs and sea creatures including a giant Pacific octopus, a moray eel, clownfish, tangs, grouper, snapper, garibaldi, sea anemones and sea stars.

The Rainforest exhibit explores the tropical rainforests of the world, and life inside their rivers. The exhibit features macaws, red-bellied piranha, freshwater stingrays, emerald tree boas, poison dart frogs, archerfish, arowana, and skinks.

The Sunken Temple showcases species such as lionfish, Goliath bird-eating spider, porcupinefish, an electric eel, and a reticulated python.

The Gulf of Mexico exhibit features an oil rig habitat theme that includes a nurse shark, snapper, redfish, tarpon, jacks, blue runner and more.

Discovery rig features sea horses, discus, triggerfish, a dogface puffer, a chuckwalla and more. It also accommodates a touch screen Ocearch shark tracker.

The White Tiger of the Maharaja Temple exhibit houses the aquarium's white tigers. (On September 19, 2016, Downtown Aquarium, Houston, was served with a notice for animal abuse concerning the "deplorable" living conditions of the housed tigers, which are members of an endangered species. This prompted the construction of an outdoor expansion to the exhibit.)

Stingray Reef allows visitors to get up close and intertact with the stingrays.

== Other attractions ==
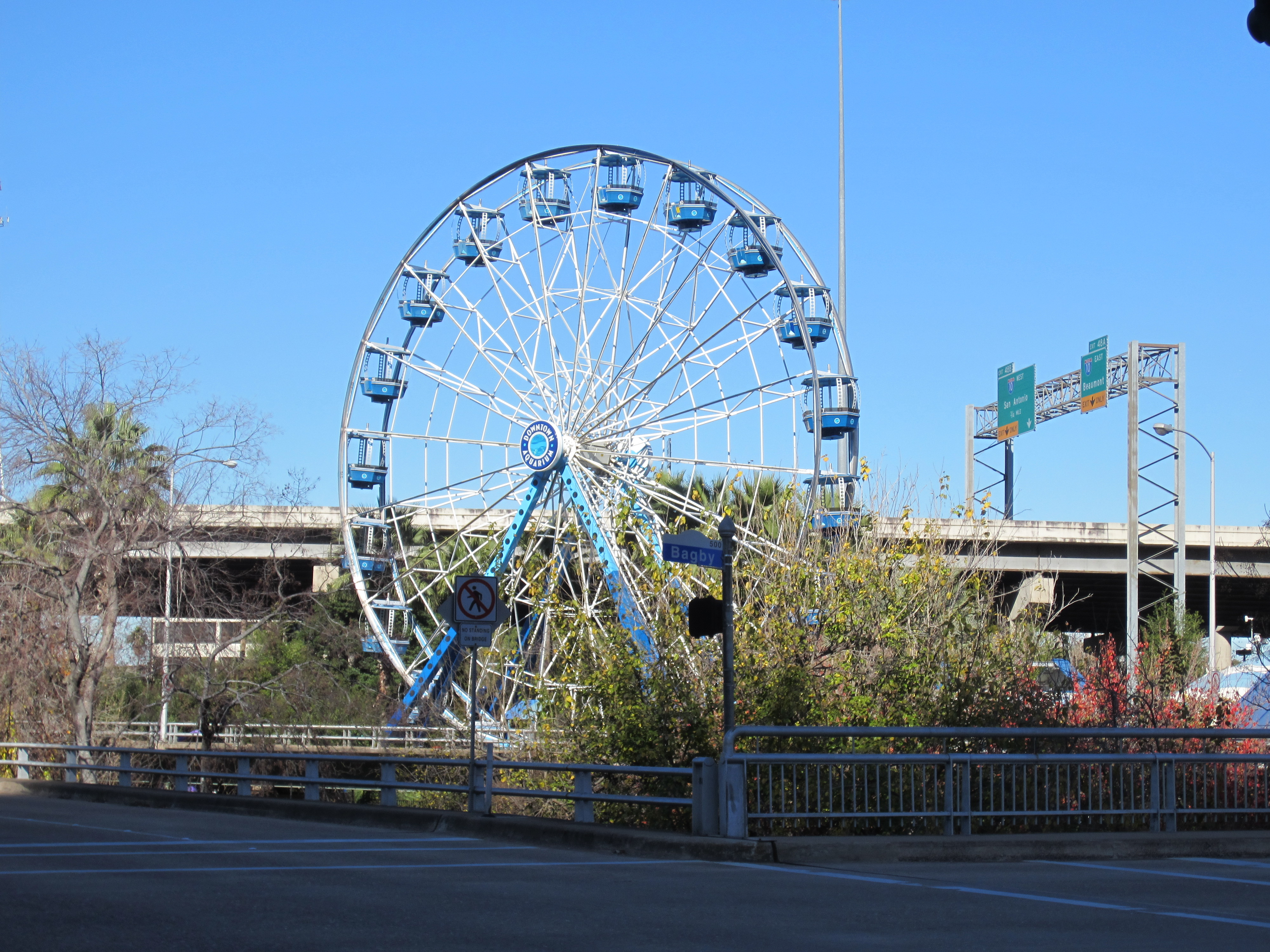
Ferris wheel located at the aquarium

Shark Voyage, a 2 ft (610 mm) narrow gauge C.P. Huntington train ride built by Chance Rides, tours the entire property and stops in the center of a 200,000-US-gallon (760,000 L) shark habitat to let visitors watch and learn about the sharks. The shark habitat viewed from the train is in a separate building from the main aquarium. In April 2018, the Downtown Aquarium became home to the first electric C. P. Huntington train, the 400th example built by Chance.

Other facilities on the aquarium property include two restaurants, a bar, and banquet facilities in the main building; and the Diving Bell Ferris Wheel and an aquatic-themed carousel outside. One of the restaurants includes a 110,000-US-gallon (420,000 L) centerpiece aquarium which is the largest cylindrical tank in the United States.

There are two additional rides; Lighthouse Dive, which is a drop tower, and the Frog Hopper ride for younger children. The facility also features carnival-styled games. On July 12, 2009, two miniature trains collided in the loading area. According to officials, one train hit the back of the other, forcing two cars off the track. 31 people were injured and 27 were taken to the hospital. Nobody was seriously injured, and there was minimal damage to the trains.
