= Downtown Aquarium (Denver) =

Downtown Aquarium, Denver

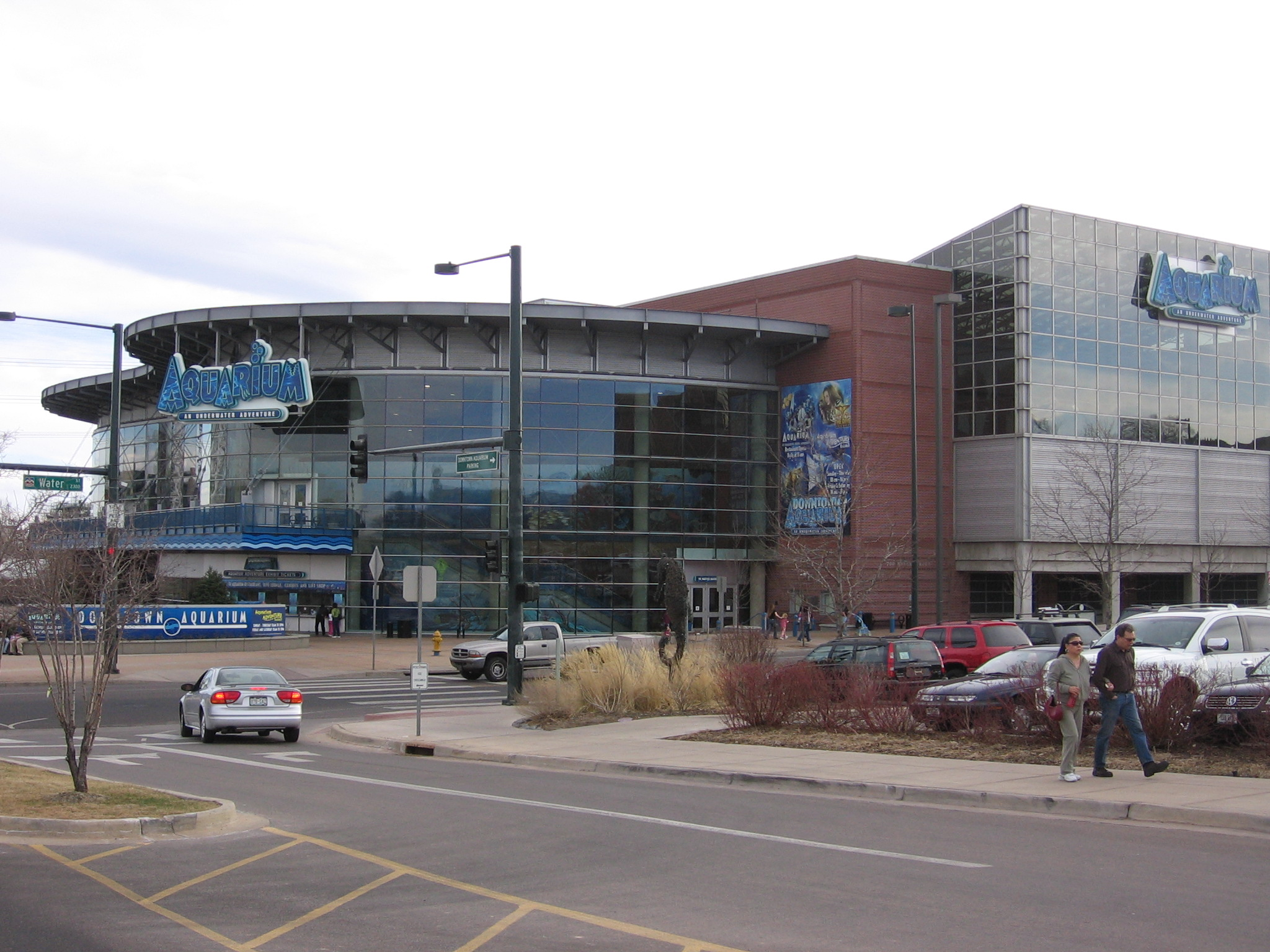
- Exterior view from the parking lot
- Interactive map of Downtown Aquarium, Denver
- 39°45′6″N 105°0′51″W
- Date opened: June 21, 1999
- Location: Denver, Colorado, United States
- Land area: 17-acre (6.9 ha)
- Floor space: 107,000 square feet (9,900 m^{2})
- No. of animals: 5,000
- No. of species: 500
- Total volume of tanks: 1,000,000 US gallons (3,785,000 L)
- Memberships: AZA
- Website: www.aquariumrestaurants.com/downtownaquariumdenver

Downtown Aquarium (formerly Colorado's Ocean Journey) is a for profit aquarium and restaurant located in Denver, Colorado, United States, at the intersection of I-25 and 23rd Ave. The 107,000 square feet (9,900 m^{2}) main building sits on a 17-acre (6.9 ha) site adjacent to the South Platte River. Its freshwater and marine aquaria total approximately 1,000,000 US gallons (3,785,000 L), and exhibit a variety of fish and other animals.

The Downtown Aquarium in Denver is owned and operated by Landry's Restaurants, Inc. It is accredited by the Association of Zoos and Aquariums (AZA).

== History ==
Colorado's Ocean Journey was founded by Bill Fleming and Judy Petersen Fleming as a nonprofit entity. It was partially funded by a $57 million bond loan as well as loans by the department of Housing and Urban Development, and its total cost was $93 million. The facility opened June 21, 1999 and soon earned accreditation by the Association of Zoos and Aquariums (AZA).

The Downtown Aquarium was originally called Ocean Journey. It had two guest experiences: one about the Colorado River and another about the Kampar River in Indonesia. The Ocean Journey aquarium was not able to make payments on its high construction debt, and filed for bankruptcy in April 2002 with a $62.5 million debt. Landry's Restaurants, Inc. purchased the facility in March 2003 for $13.6 million.

After the purchase, the facility remained open to the public until the summer of 2005, when it closed briefly for renovations. These included the addition of a full-service restaurant, bar, and ballroom. A 150,000-US-gallon (568,000 L) marine aquarium was added to the restaurant area. Upon its reopening July 14, 2005, the facility was renamed Downtown Aquarium.

== Exhibits ==
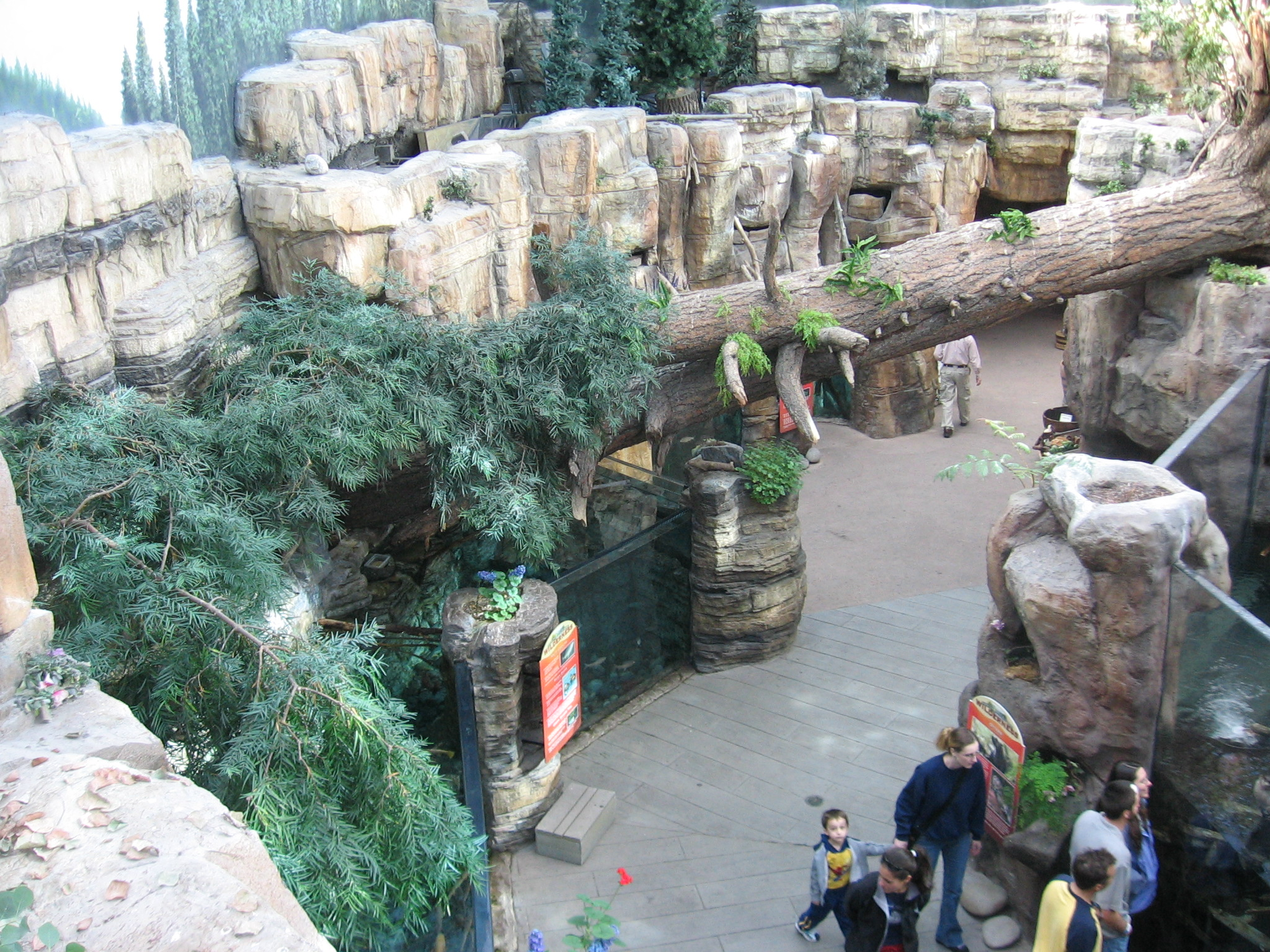
North America exhibit area

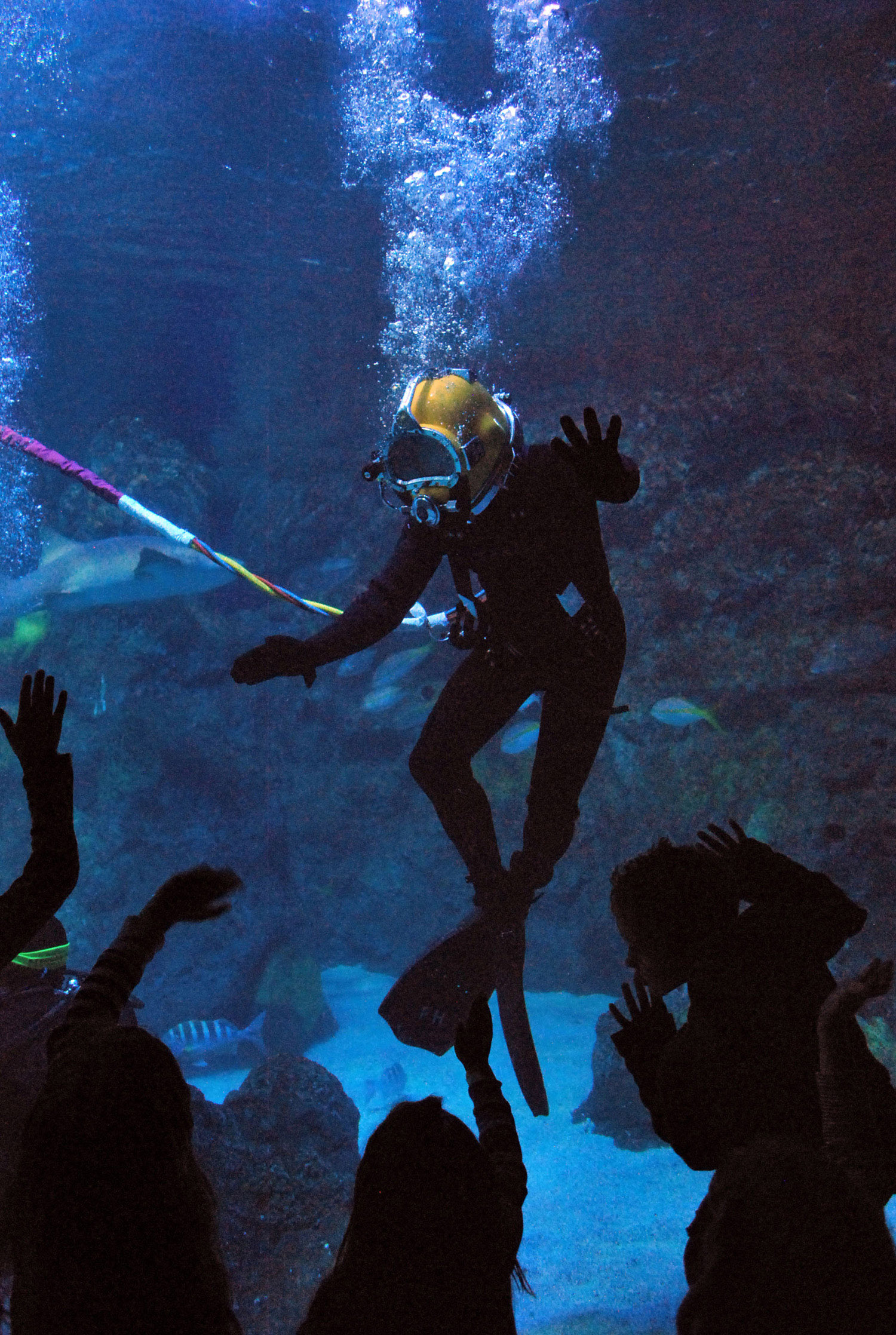
U.S. Navy Week DENVER (May 2, 2011) Navy Diver 1st Class Bryce Weber, assigned to San Diego–based Mobile Diving and Salvage Unit (MDSU) 1, greets visitors at the Downtown Aquarium (Denver).

A major theme for this landlocked aquarium is the relationship between inland freshwater ecosystems and the ocean. The original design of the aquarium was zoogeographic. It focused on the path to the ocean taken by two rivers, the Colorado River in North America and the Kampar River in Indonesia. The Colorado River Journey included exhibits of endangered fish, including desert pupfish; gamefish such as bass; and North American river otters, among other species. It ended with a large exhibit depicting the Sea of Cortez, into which the Colorado River empties. The Indonesia River Journey included exhibits of animals such as Asian arowanas, rainbowfish, and endangered Sumatran tigers. It ended with a large exhibit depicting the southern Pacific Ocean. In addition to these two journeys, the aquarium housed a large sea otter exhibit.

After the 2005 renovations, the two journey paths remain, but are no longer arranged in a strictly zoogeographic pattern. Tanks have been added that house species from African and South American freshwater ecosystems. Other tanks are mixed community aquariums.

The facility features several interactive exhibits, including a horseshoe crab touch tank and a stingray touch-and-feed tank.

The aquarium continues to focus on conservation. To that end, it houses numerous endangered or threatened species: twelve species of fish, six of reptiles, two of mammals, and two of birds. It participates in the AZA's Species Survival Plan for Sumatran tigers.

== Education ==
A volunteer program administered by the Deep Blue Sea Foundation, a nonprofit group, is in place. The Deep Blue Sea Foundation was formed after Landry's purchased the aquarium to ensure the educational goals of the original founders would continue to be met. The aquarium also periodically hosts for-cost educational seminars.
