= Saltgrass Steak House =

American restaurant chain

- Founded: 1991; 35 years ago
- Headquarters: Houston, Texas, United States
- Number of locations: 96
- Key people: Tilman J. Fertitta (President, CEO & Sole Owner); Terry Turney (COO)
- Owner: Landry's Restaurants
- Website: saltgrass.com

Saltgrass Steak House is an American restaurant concept with more than 96 locations across the country. The company is based in Houston, Texas, and is wholly owned by Landry's, Inc.

== History ==
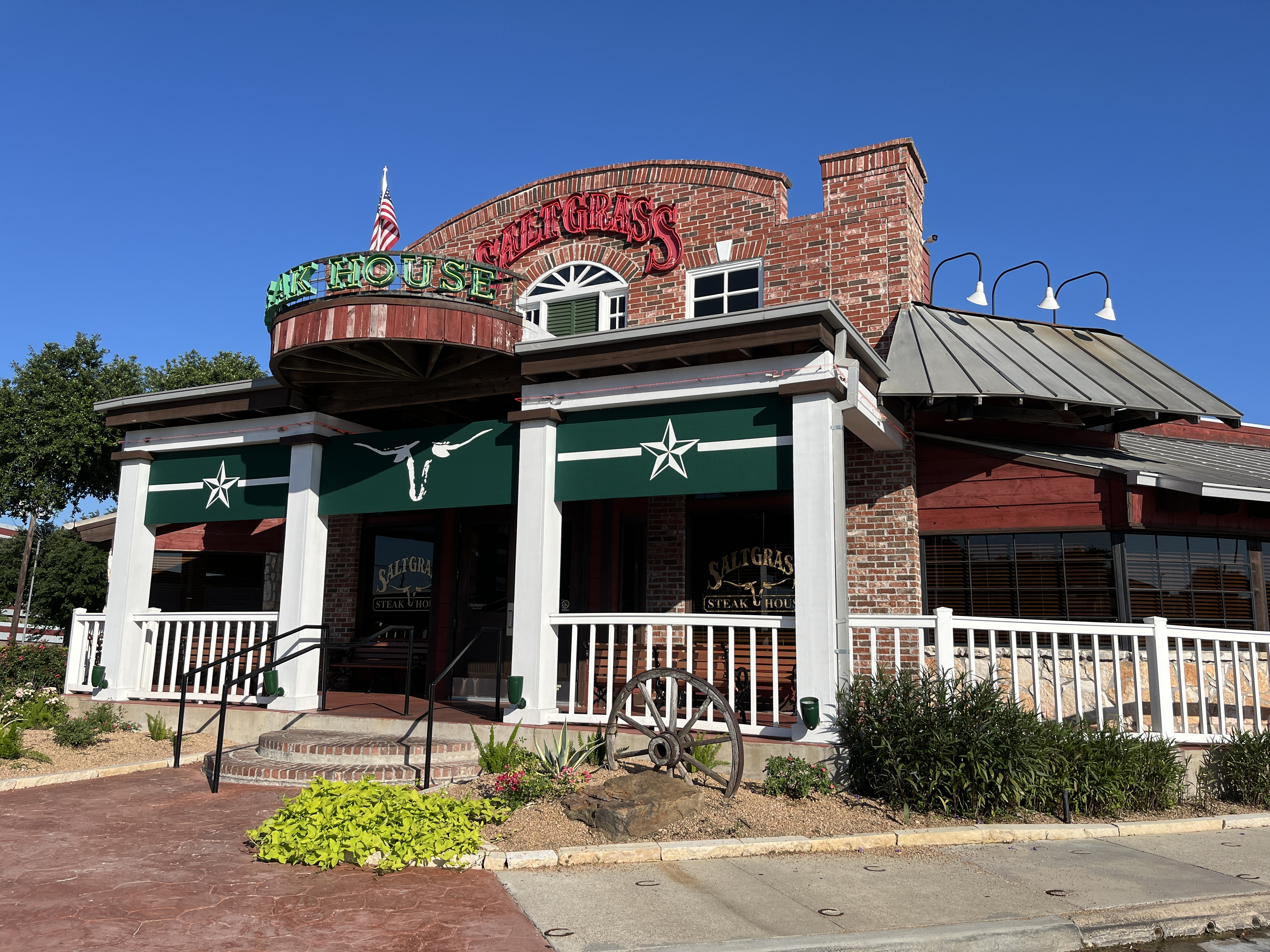
Exterior of a restaurant in Houston, 2024

The first Saltgrass Steak House opened in March 1991 along the Katy Freeway (I-10) in Houston. It sits along the historic trail where cattle herders would drive their livestock south to graze on the salt grasses of the Texas Gulf Coast. Every year, as teams of riders travel the trail before the opening of the Houston Livestock Show and Rodeo, they pass by the original restaurant.

=== Acquisition by Landry’s, Inc. ===
In September 2002, Tilman Fertitta, president, CEO and sole owner of Landry's, Inc., announced his company had acquired Saltgrass Steak House, then a 24-unit chain, for $75 million. Fertitta moved the restaurant's operations to Landry's headquarters in the Uptown area of Houston.
