= Bubba Gump Shrimp Company =

American seafood restaurant chain

- Type: Subsidiary
- Industry: Seafood restaurant Franchising
- Founded: 1996; 30 years ago, in Monterey, California
- Headquarters: Houston, Texas
- Number of locations: 33 restaurants
- Area served: United States; Canada; Mexico; Mainland China; Hong Kong; Indonesia; Japan; Australia
- Parent: Landry's, Inc. (2010-present)
- Website: www.bubbagump.com

The Bubba Gump Shrimp Company is an American seafood restaurant chain inspired by the 1994 film Forrest Gump, based in Houston, Texas, and a division of Landry's Restaurants since 2010. As of 2026, 33 restaurants operate worldwide: twenty-one in the U.S., four in Mexico, three in Japan, and one each in Mainland China, Hong Kong, Indonesia, Canada and Australia.

The first Bubba Gump restaurant opened in 1996 in Monterey, California, by Rusty Pelican Restaurants in partnership with Paramount, the distributor of Forrest Gump. It was named from the film's characters Benjamin Buford "Bubba" Blue and Forrest Gump. Before his death in the Vietnam War, Bubba convinces Gump to go into the shrimping business.

== History ==
In 1995, entrepreneur Anthony Zolezzi bought the rights to the name "Bubba Gump Shrimp Co." from Paramount Pictures in an attempt to turn around a financially troubled seafood company, Meridian Products.

The Bubba Gump Shrimp Co. line of packaged imported shrimp products were sold in supermarkets across the US and in international markets. Zolezzi was approached by a friend in the seafood restaurant business about licensing the name. Zolezzi consulted with Paramount and the Rusty Pelican restaurant chain was to launch the first Bubba Gump Shrimp Co. restaurant in Monterey, California in 1996. Its success led to its franchising on an international scale.

In November 2010, Landry's, Inc. acquired Bubba Gump Shrimp Co. for an undisclosed amount. The Bubba Gump Shrimp Co. purchase also included a lone Rusty Pelican in Newport Beach, California. As a result, the restaurant's headquarters moved from Hollywood, California to Houston, Texas.

As the name implies, Bubba Gump Shrimp Co.'s menu consists mostly of imported shrimp dishes. It serves other seafood, as well as Southern and Cajun cuisine, as the characters of Forrest and Bubba were from Alabama. The restaurant offers dishes named after characters in the movie, like Jenny's Catch and the restaurant's bestseller Forrest's Seafood Feast. Restaurants display movie memorabilia throughout the building. Guests can play Forrest Gump movie trivia and can signal their waiter with a "Stop, Forrest, Stop" sign. The mascot of the chain is a shrimp named Shrimp Louie.

=== Employee social media policy ===
In 2013, a former Bubba Gump employee claimed that the social media policy in the company's employee handbook had a restrictive effect on employees' rights by prohibiting them from discussing their jobs online. In 2015, a National Labor Relations Board administrative law judge ruled that Bubba Gump did not violate employees' rights as they did not explicitly prohibit employees from discussing job-related subjects, but only expected them to do so in a civil manner. There had been cases previously in which the National Labor Relations Board found companies social media policies to be excessively broad, and ruled in favor of the employee(s).

== Gallery ==
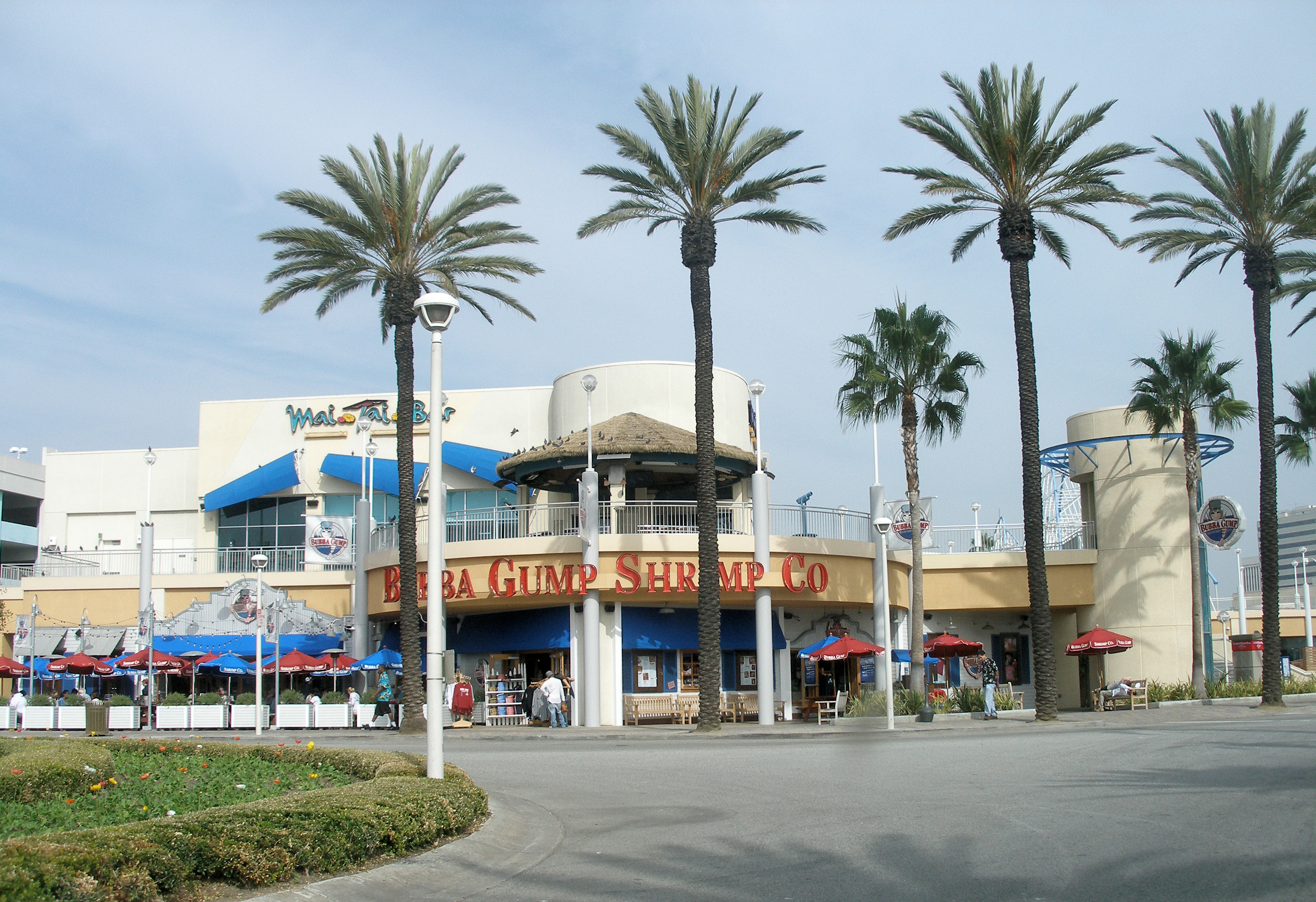
The Bubba Gump Shrimp Co. restaurant in Long Beach, California

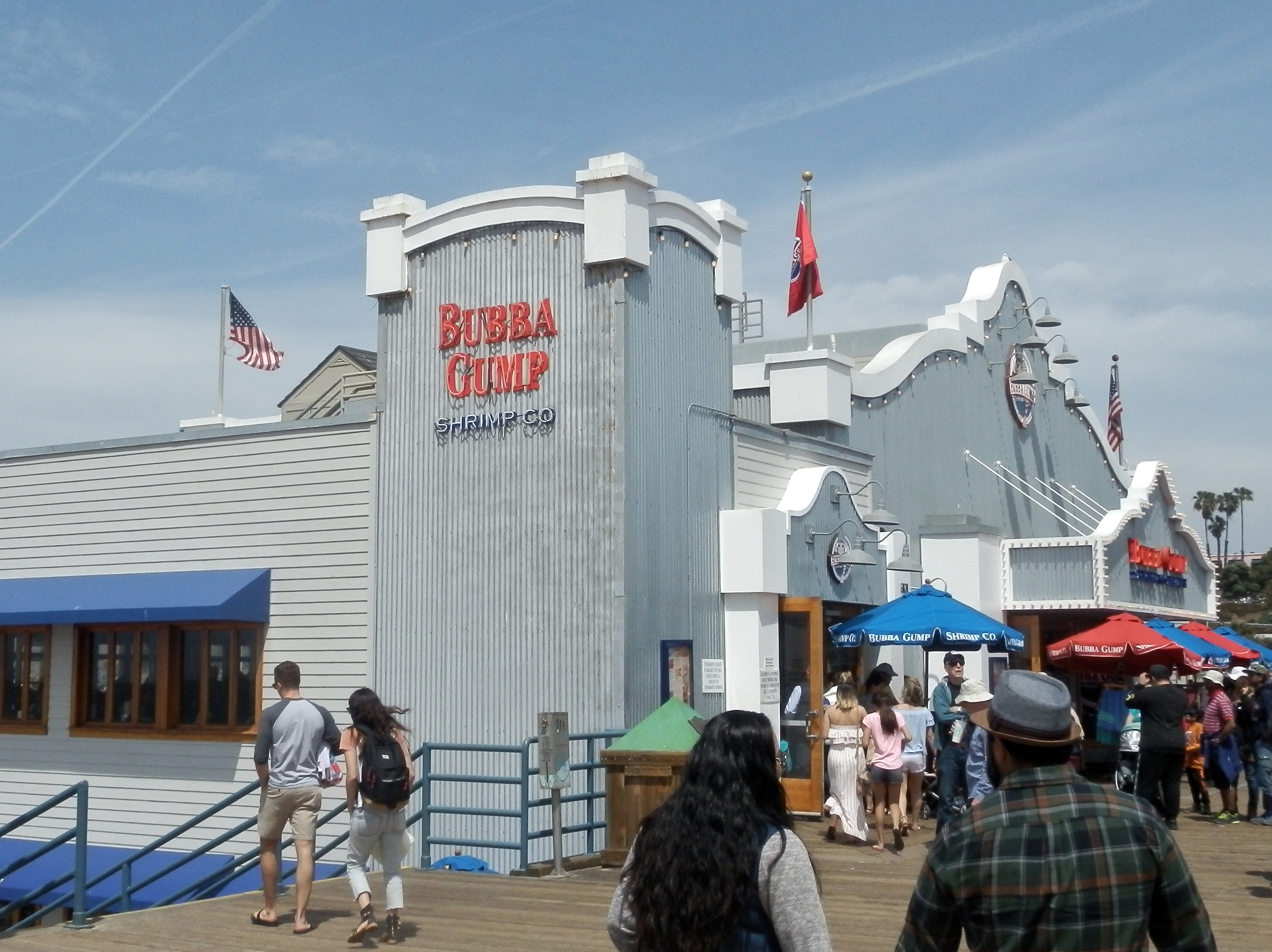
The Bubba Gump Shrimp Co. restaurant on the Santa Monica Pier

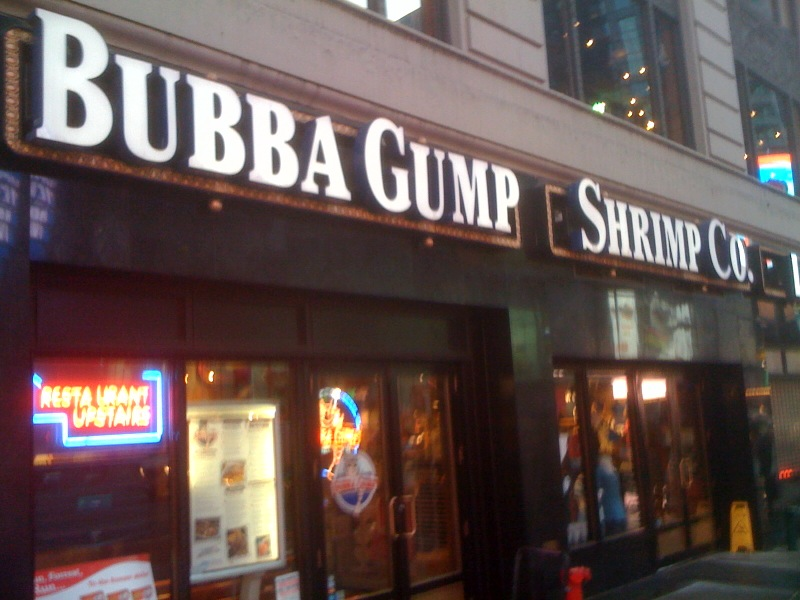
The Bubba Gump Shrimp Co. restaurant in Times Square, New York City

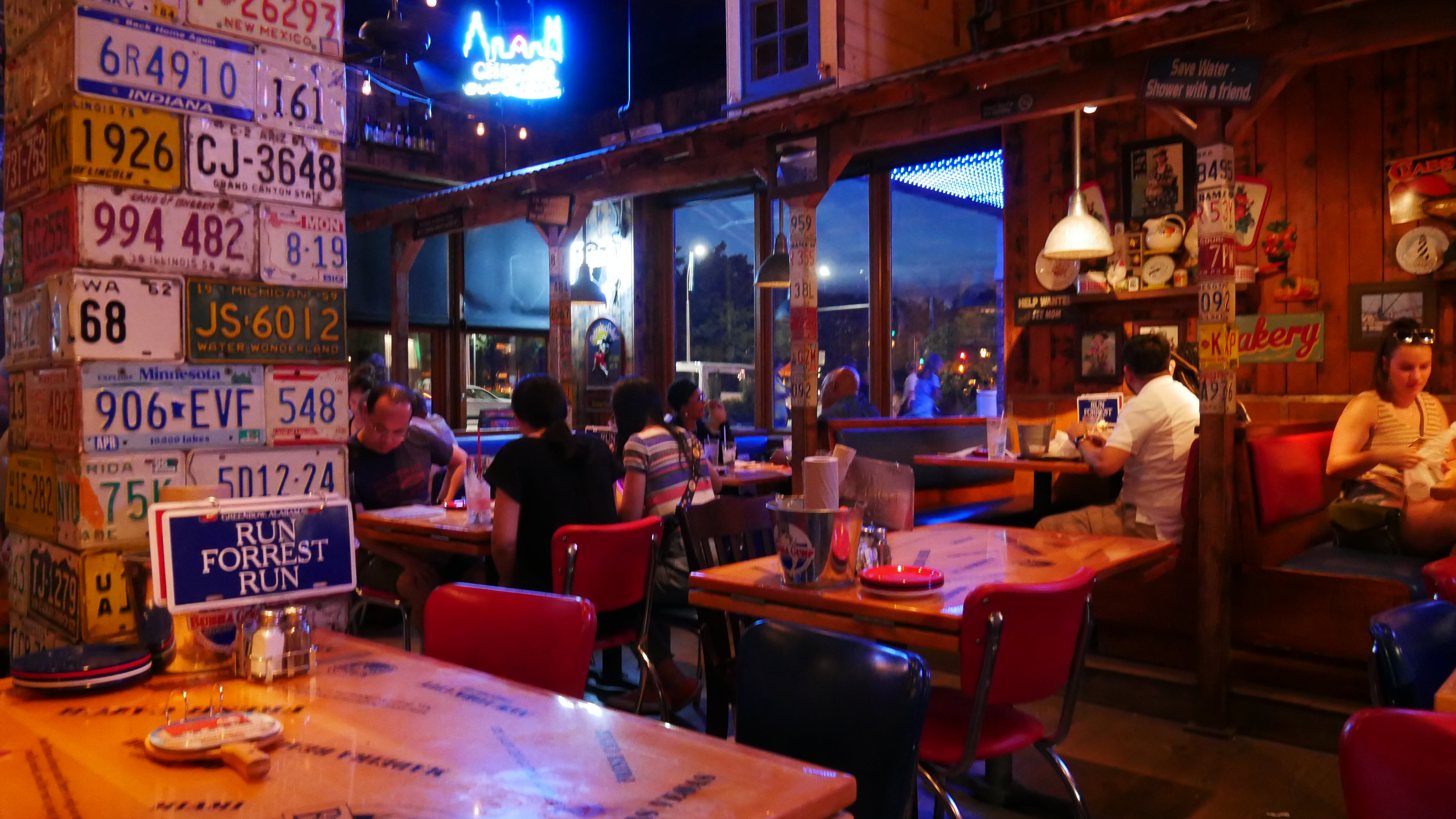
The Bubba Gump Shrimp Co. at Navy Pier Chicago, Illinois (closed in 2020)

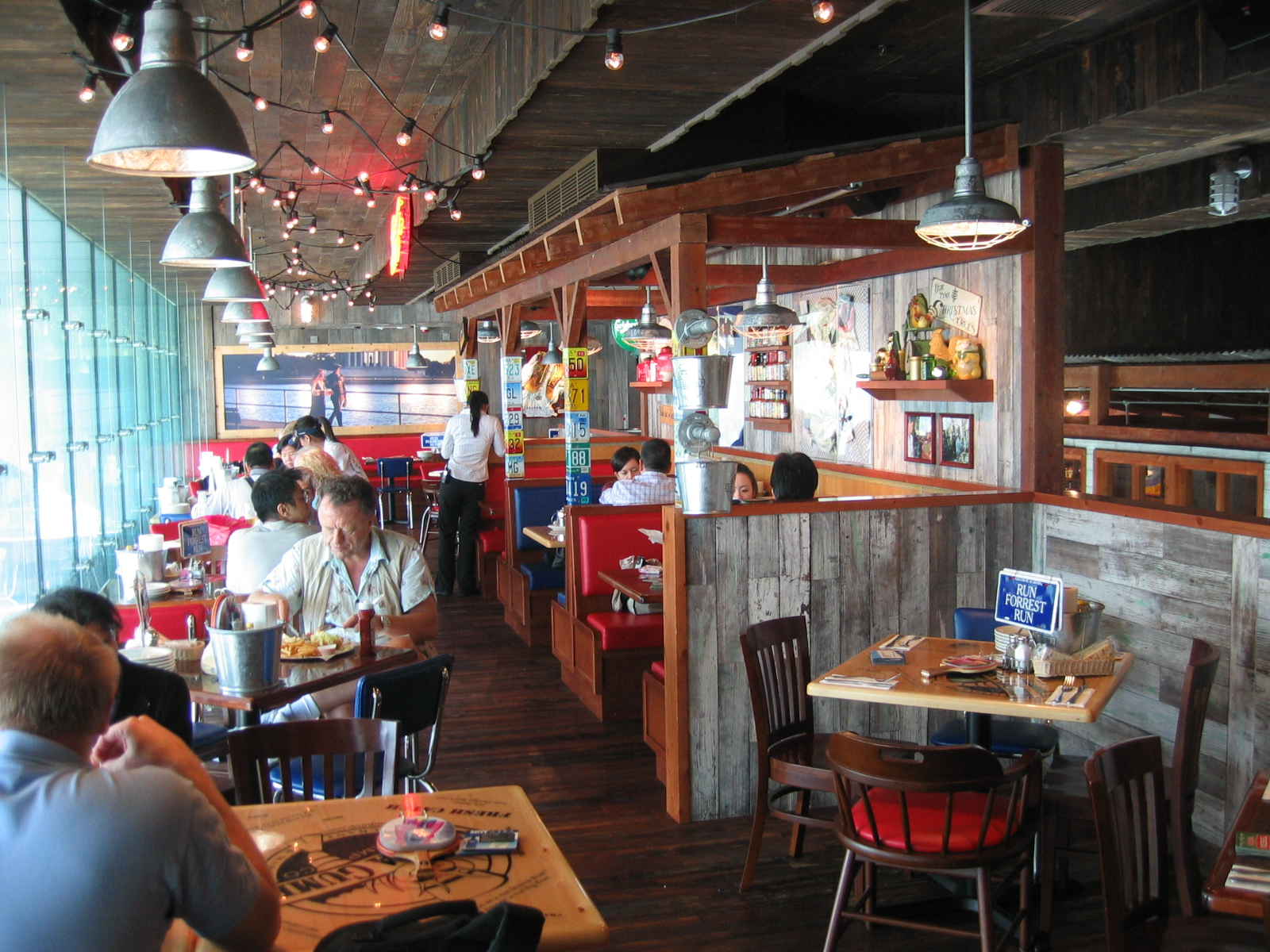
Bubba Gump Restaurant in Hong Kong

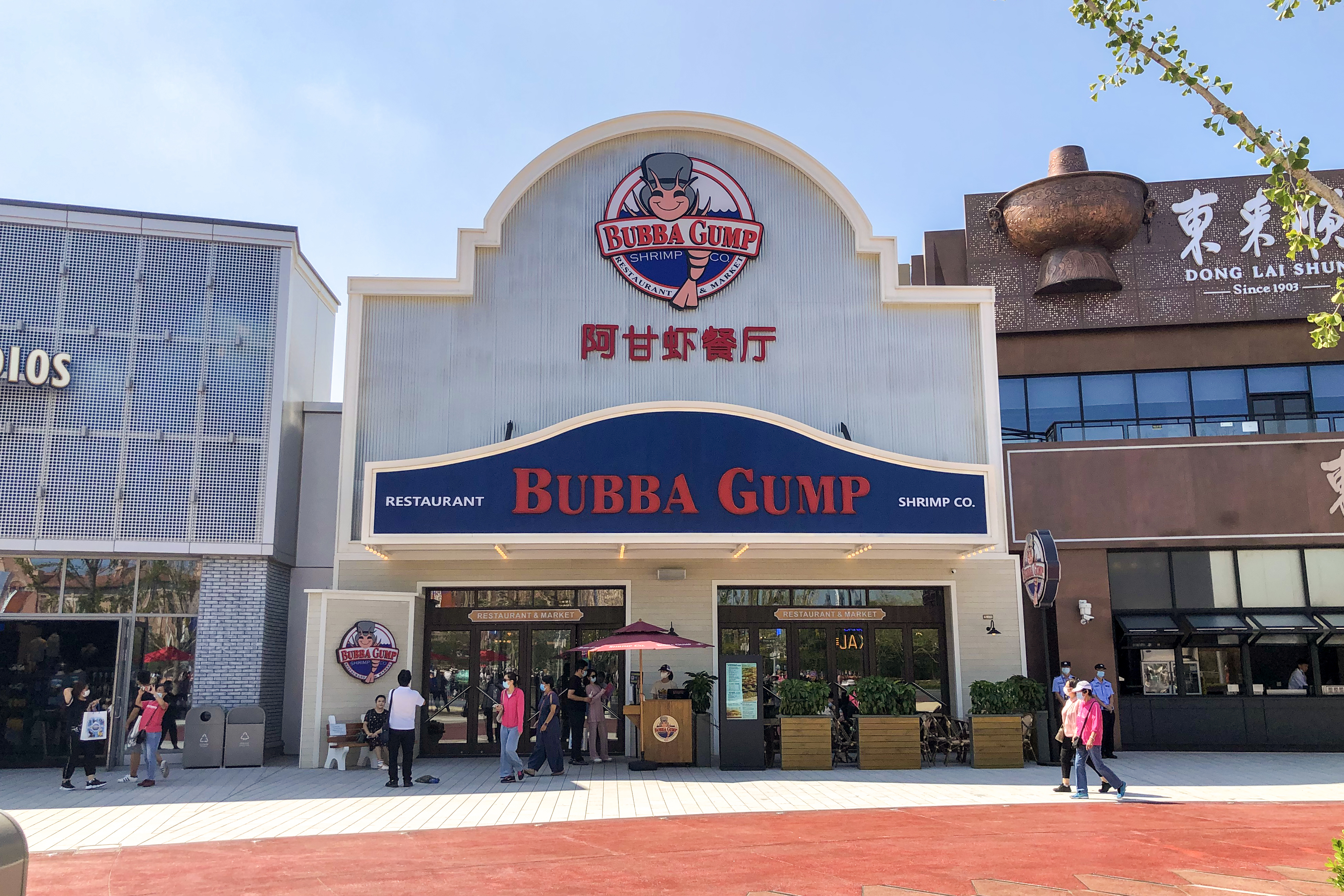
The Bubba Gump Shrimp Co. restaurant in Universal CityWalk Beijing, Universal Beijing Resort, Tongzhou, Beijing

== See also ==
- List of seafood restaurants
