= Claim Jumper =

American restaurant chain

- Industry: Restaurant
- Founded: September 27, 1977; 49 years ago in Los Alamitos, California
- Headquarters: Houston, Texas, U.S.
- Number of locations: 7 (July 2026)
- Key people: Tilman J. Fertitta (President, CEO, and owner); Michael Kelly (franchise partner)
- Parent: Kelly Restaurant Group Landry's, Inc.
- Website: www.claimjumper.com

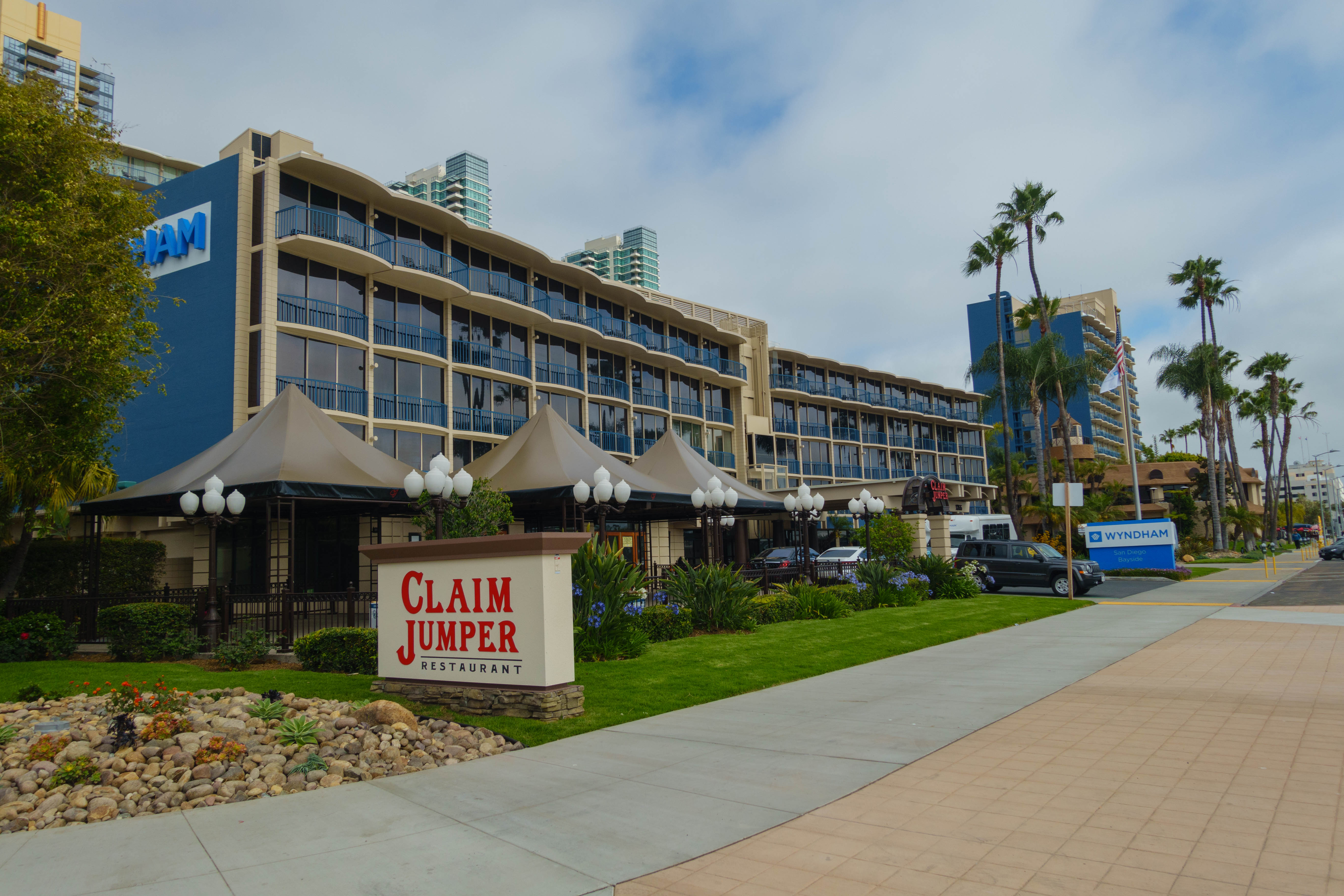
A Claim Jumper restaurant in San Diego

Claim Jumper Restaurant and Saloon is an American restaurant chain with 7 locations as of July 2026. The company is based in Houston, Texas.

== History ==
Restaurateur Craig Nickoloff opened the first Claim Jumper in Los Alamitos, California, on September 27, 1977. The original restaurant had a large menu and an atmosphere inspired by California's Gold Rush of 1849.

=== Acquisition by Landry’s, Inc. ===
In September 2010, the chain filed for bankruptcy and was slated to be auctioned off. In October 2010, Landry's, Inc. acquired Claim Jumper, with a bid of $76.6 million. Landry's President/CEO Tilman J. Fertitta relocated the company's headquarters from Irvine, California, to Landry's corporate headquarters in the Uptown area of Houston.

In October 2022, Claim Jumper quietly filed for Chapter 11 bankruptcy for the second time in twelve years.

== Franchised locations ==
All locations on the Claim Jumper website are franchised to Kelly Restaurant Group (KRG). As of July 2026, KRG has 4 locations in California and Oregon.

Due to the onset of the COVID-19 pandemic and the fact that part of the business was a buffet, KRG closed some of its locations, including the ones in Long Beach, California, Valencia, California, Nashville, Tennessee, and Lynnwood, Washington.

== Non-franchised locations ==
There are three locations that are still owned and operated by Landry's. They are located inside the Golden Nuggets of Laughlin, Nevada, Las Vegas, Nevada, and Lake Charles, Louisiana. These are also the only Claim Jumpers to be under the Landry's Select Club rewards program.
