= Golden nugget (disambiguation) =

Golden nugget may refer to:

== Brands and enterprises ==
- Golden Nugget, Inc., a Houston-based casino resort chain
  - Golden Nugget Atlantic City, a hotel, casino, and marina in Atlantic City, New Jersey
  - Golden Nugget Las Vegas, a luxury hotel and casino in Las Vegas, Nevada
  - Golden Nugget Lake Charles
  - Golden Nugget Laughlin, a hotel and casino in Laughlin, Nevada
- Golden Nugget Companies (1973–1989), became Mirage Resorts
- Golden Nugget Pancake House, a chain of family restaurants
- Golden Nuggets, a breakfast cereal

== Games ==
- Golden Nugget (video game) for Microsoft Windows and PlayStation
- Golden Nugget 64 for Nintendo 64
- Golden Nugget Casino DS for the Nintendo DS

== See also ==
- Australian Gold Nugget
- Gold nugget
- List of gold nuggets by size
- Nugget (disambiguation)
