= Nuggets =

Nuggets may refer to:

== Music ==
- Nuggets (series), a series of compilation albums by Elektra Records, continued by Rhino
  - Nuggets: Original Artyfacts from the First Psychedelic Era, 1965–1968
  - Nuggets II: Original Artyfacts from the British Empire and Beyond, 1964–1969, a Rhino Records box set
  - Children of Nuggets: Original Artyfacts from the Second Psychedelic Era, 1976–1995, the third box set
  - Love Is the Song We Sing: San Francisco Nuggets 1965–1970, the fourth box
  - Where the Action Is! Los Angeles Nuggets: 1965–1968, the fifth box set
  - Nuggets, Volume 7: Early San Francisco, a compilation album of American psychedelic rock and folk rock
  - Nuggets, Vol. 9: Acid Rock, a compilation album

== Sports ==
- Denver Nuggets, basketball team
- Montana Golden Nuggets, a former Continental Basketball Association team
- Otago Nuggets, a New Zealand basketball team

== Other ==
- Nuggets (film), a 2014 animated short film
- The Nuggets, Tasmanian island
- The Nuggets (New Zealand), a group of islets in New Zealand
- Golden Nuggets, a breakfast cereal
- Chicken nuggets
  - McNuggets

== See also ==
- Nugget (disambiguation)
