= The Post Oak =

- Interactive map of the The Post Oak area

General information
- Status: Completed
- Type: Hotel, Office, Residential, Retail
- Location: 1600 West Loop S Houston, Texas; United States
- Coordinates: 29.7521°N 95.4573°W
- Construction started: 2015
- Completed: 2018
- Opening: March 12, 2018; 8 years ago
- Owner: Tilman Fertitta, Fertitta Entertainment

Technical details
- Floor count: 36

Design and construction
- Developer: Tilman Fertitta

The Post Oak Hotel & Tower, also popularly nicknamed the Fertitta Tower is a 36-story, 499-foot-high (152 m) mixed-use skyscraper in Uptown Houston, Texas, United States. The building operates a hotel, office space, residencies, and retail. The Post Oak serves as the headquarters for Fertitta Entertainment and its subsidiaries including Landry's, Inc., the Houston Rockets, and the Golden Nugget casinos. A penthouse room which houses Fertitta, the developer, is located in the building.

== Features ==
=== Spa ===
The Spa at the Post Oak is a 20,000-square-foot (1,900 m^{2}) spa. It is the only Forbes designated five-star spa in Texas. Its signature treatment, "Ritual of the Five Worlds" is only available in the spa. The owner, Tilman Fertitta, stated that he visited many of the best spas in the world in order to get inspired to deliver the best spa to the building. Other amenities in the spa include indoor pools and therapeutic tubs, treatment rooms equipped with showers, steam rooms and saunas, zero-gravity massage chairs, and a luxury fitness center.

=== Restaurants ===
Prior to the hotel's opening, the Landry's-owned restaurant chain Mastro's Steakhouse opened as the brand's flagship location. Other notable restaurants include Willie G's and Bloom and Bee.

An upscale cocktail bar named H Bar is located in the hotel's lobby and is notable for its $1,600 hamburger known as the "Black Gold" burger. A 30,000 wine cellar known as The Cellar is available for rent and features authentic tuscan-style decor. The wine selection is also available to be ordered at the property restaurants.

== Media ==
The Fertitta Entertainment headquarters inside the Post Oak is the site for negotiating deals in TV-series Billion Dollar Buyer on CNBC. The series' second season featured episodes that showcased the development of the hotel tower.
