= Tilman Fertitta =

American businessman, diplomat and television personality (born 1957)

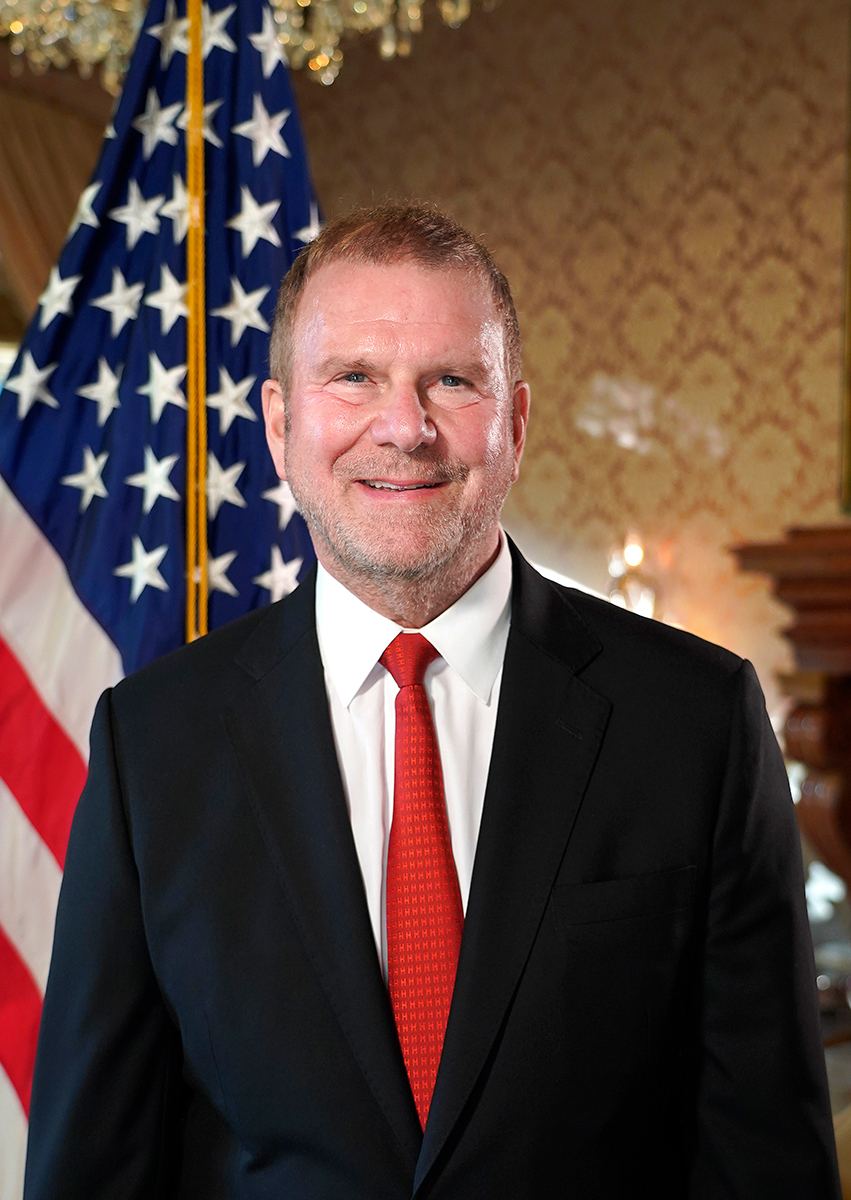
- Official portrait, 2025

21st United States Ambassador to Italy 6th United States Ambassador to San Marino
- Incumbent
- Assumed office May 6, 2025
- President: Donald Trump
- Preceded by: Jack Markell

Personal details
- Born: Tilman Joseph Fertitta; June 25, 1957 (age 69) Galveston, Texas, U.S.
- Spouses: Paige Farwell (m. 1991, divorced): Lauren Ware
- Children: 5
- Relatives: Lorenzo Fertitta (cousin); Frank Fertitta III (cousin); Frank Fertitta Jr. (cousin)
- Education: Texas Tech University (no degree); University of Houston (no degree)
- Occupation: Businessman
- Known for: Owner of Landry's, Inc. and the Houston Rockets; Star of Billion Dollar Buyer

Tilman Joseph Fertitta (born June 25, 1957) is an American diplomat, businessman and television personality. He serves as the United States ambassador to Italy and San Marino since May 2025. He is the owner of the entertainment company Landry's, as well as the National Basketball Association (NBA)'s Houston Rockets. Fertitta was the chairman of the board of regents of the University of Houston System from 2014 to 2025.

As of May 2025, his net worth was estimated at $10.7 billion. He is placed at No. 248 on the Forbes 400 list. Forbes calls him the "World's Richest Restaurateur." Fertitta became the star of Billion Dollar Buyer on CNBC. On September 5, 2017, Fertitta reached an agreement to buy the Houston Rockets for $2.2 billion. As of April 2025, Fertitta is the lead shareholder in Wynn Resorts.

== Early life and education ==
Tilman Joseph Fertitta was born in Galveston, Texas, on June 25, 1957. He is of Sicilian descent. His father, Vic, owned a seafood restaurant on Galveston Island, and after school, Tilman worked peeling shrimp in his father's restaurant. Fertitta attended Texas Tech University and the University of Houston, studying business administration and hospitality management but never graduated. His first entrepreneurial experience involved selling and promoting Shaklee vitamins. In the 1980s, Fertitta bought Landry's in Katy, Texas, from brothers Bill and Floyd Landry after being introduced by his cousin. The Landry brothers were from Lafayette and started the restaurant in the 1970s.

== Career ==
In the 1980s, Fertitta founded and ran a construction and development business, and developed his first major project, the Key Largo Hotel in Galveston.

=== Landry's restaurants ===
Fertitta was a partner in the first Landry's Restaurant, Landry's Seafood, which opened its doors in the Houston suburb of Katy, Texas, in 1980. A year later, he helped open Willie G's Seafood & Steaks, a more upscale restaurant in Uptown Houston. In 1986, Fertitta gained controlling interests of both locations, and in 1988, became sole owner of Landry's Restaurants. In 1993, he took Landry's, Inc. public and the company grew quickly. In 1993, Landry's was valued at approximately $30 million.

In 2004, Fertitta was elected to the Texas Business Hall of Fame, becoming the second-youngest Texan to ever earn that distinction, behind only Michael Dell. In 2010, Fertitta, who already owned the majority of Landry's, Inc. stock, purchased all outstanding shares, becoming sole owner again. By 2011, the company's value had skyrocketed to a value of more than $1.7 billion.

The Landry's portfolio includes: The Golden Nugget Hotel and Casinos; Morton's The Steakhouse; Rainforest Cafe; Bubba Gump Shrimp Co.; McCormick & Schmick's Seafood & Steaks; Saltgrass Steak House; Claim Jumper; Chart House; The Oceanaire; Mastro's Restaurants; Grotto Restaurants, The Boathouse Restaurants, and Vic & Anthony's Steakhouse. In 2017, Fertitta acquired half of EMM group, owner of the Catch Restaurants. He is also the owner of the holding company Fertitta Entertainment.

=== Hotels ===
Fertitta first built the Key Largo Hotel in Galveston, Texas and then sold it in order to buy the rights to Landry's. After acquiring restaurants under the company, Fertitta started focusing more on the hospitality division of Landry's and acquired the San Luis Resort, Spa, & Conference Center in Galveston, Texas. He also partnered with the City of Galveston to build the conference center in 2004 inside the resort. Fertitta since acquired two additional hotels on the island, including the Holiday Inn On the Beach in 2003, and the Hilton Galveston Island Resort in 2004, which stands adjacent to his San Luis Resort. In 2015, Fertitta added the Villas at San Luis section of the hotel, which consists of ultra-luxury villas with direct access to both the beach and the hotel's pool.

In June 2022, Fertitta was recognized by the International Hospitality Institute on the Global 100 in Hospitality, on a list featuring the 100 Most Powerful People in Global Hospitality. In 2018, he opened The Post Oak Hotel at Uptown Houston, introducing a new level of luxury to Houston. The Post Oak Hotel quickly became the city's only Forbes Five-Star Hotel and Spa. In 2022 Fertitta acquired The Montage Laguna Beach for approximately $650 million.

=== Casinos ===
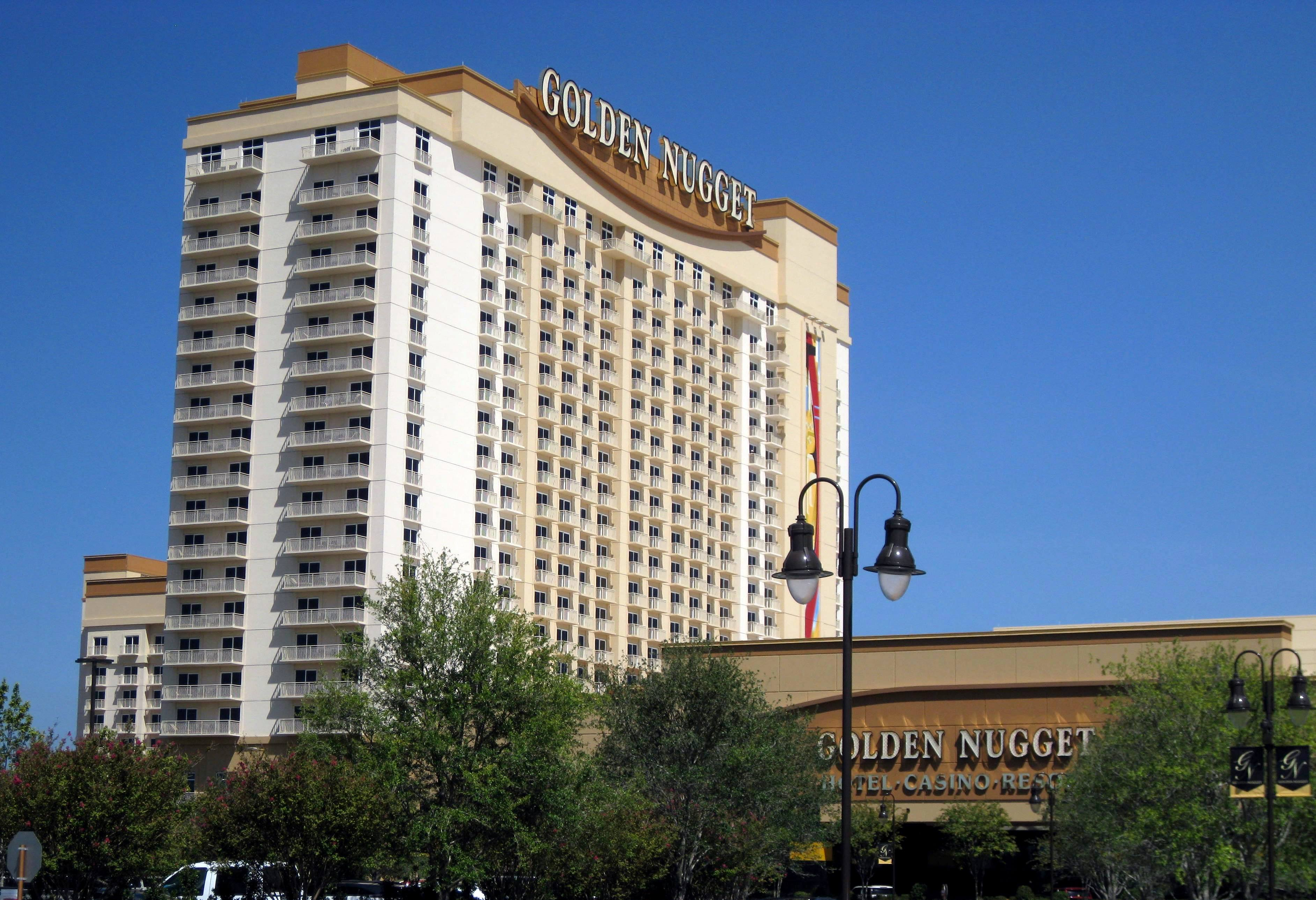
Golden Nugget Lake Charles in Lake Charles, Louisiana

Landry's first expanded to casinos in 2005 when it bought Golden Nugget Casinos, including locations in Las Vegas and Laughlin, Nevada. Since then, Landry's has opened casinos in Atlantic City, New Jersey; Biloxi, Mississippi; and Lake Charles, Louisiana. The Golden Nugget Atlantic City was previously called the Trump Marina. Fertitta purchased this casino from Trump Entertainment Resorts in 2011.

The Golden Nugget Lake Charles was bought after Fertitta found a license and resort land for sale from Pinnacle Entertainment, which owns the adjacent L'Auberge du Lac Resort. Fertitta stated he built the casino with the idea of having a casino in close proximity to his Houston hometown. After the first year proved the casino was successful, a new 300 room tower began construction on the property. In November 2024, Fertitta became the largest stockholder at the prominent Las Vegas Wynn Resorts after acquiring 9.9% of the company. In April 2025, Fertitta managed to increase his stake at Wynn Resorts after acquiring 12.3% of the company.

=== Entertainment ===
In addition to restaurants, hotels, and casinos, Landry's also owns amusement parks, aquariums, and the Kemah Boardwalk. Landry's, Inc. first acquired the Kemah Boardwalk in 1999. After acquiring the boardwalk, Fertitta added a few Landry's restaurants, and a few rides. In 2007, he added the Boardwalk Bullet which is a high speed wooden roller coaster. He also added the Boardwalk FantaSea, which is a luxury yacht cruise service where guests ride along the Galveston Bay. The marina on the boardwalk has a large concentration of boats and yachts in the Greater Houston area. The boardwalk also includes an aquarium, which is under the same Landry's line of aquarium restaurants with locations in Houston, Denver, and Nashville. Travel + Leisure magazine named the Kemah boardwalk a top 10 American boardwalk. Fertitta redeveloped the pleasure pier in Galveston, Texas, after the pier had closed after damages by Hurricane Ike. The pier reopened in 2012 as the Galveston Island Historic Pleasure Pier. The redeveloped pier includes an amusement park, Bubba Gump Shrimp Company restaurant, as well as shops.

== Sports ==
=== Rockets ===
On September 4, 2017, he agreed to purchase the Rockets from Leslie Alexander, pending league approval, for an NBA record $2.2 billion. On October 6, 2017, Fertitta was approved by the NBA to own the Houston Rockets. Fertitta paid for the Rockets by selling $1.415 billion worth of bonds and was competing with Houston-native singer Beyonce Knowles to purchase the team. By buying the Houston Rockets he also became the owner of Clutch Gaming, a professional eSports organization focused on League of Legends.

==== Texans ====
During the process of building the Houston Texans as an NFL team, Fertitta was one of the original investors in creating the franchise. He was a partner of Texans owner Bob McNair until 2008 when he had to sell his interest in the franchise because he owns the Golden Nugget casino chain (a Landry's subsidiary) and NFL rules state no staff member of a team can be associated with gambling. Both Fertitta and McNair were disappointed, as Fertitta was part of the franchise since its establishment.

==== Astros ====
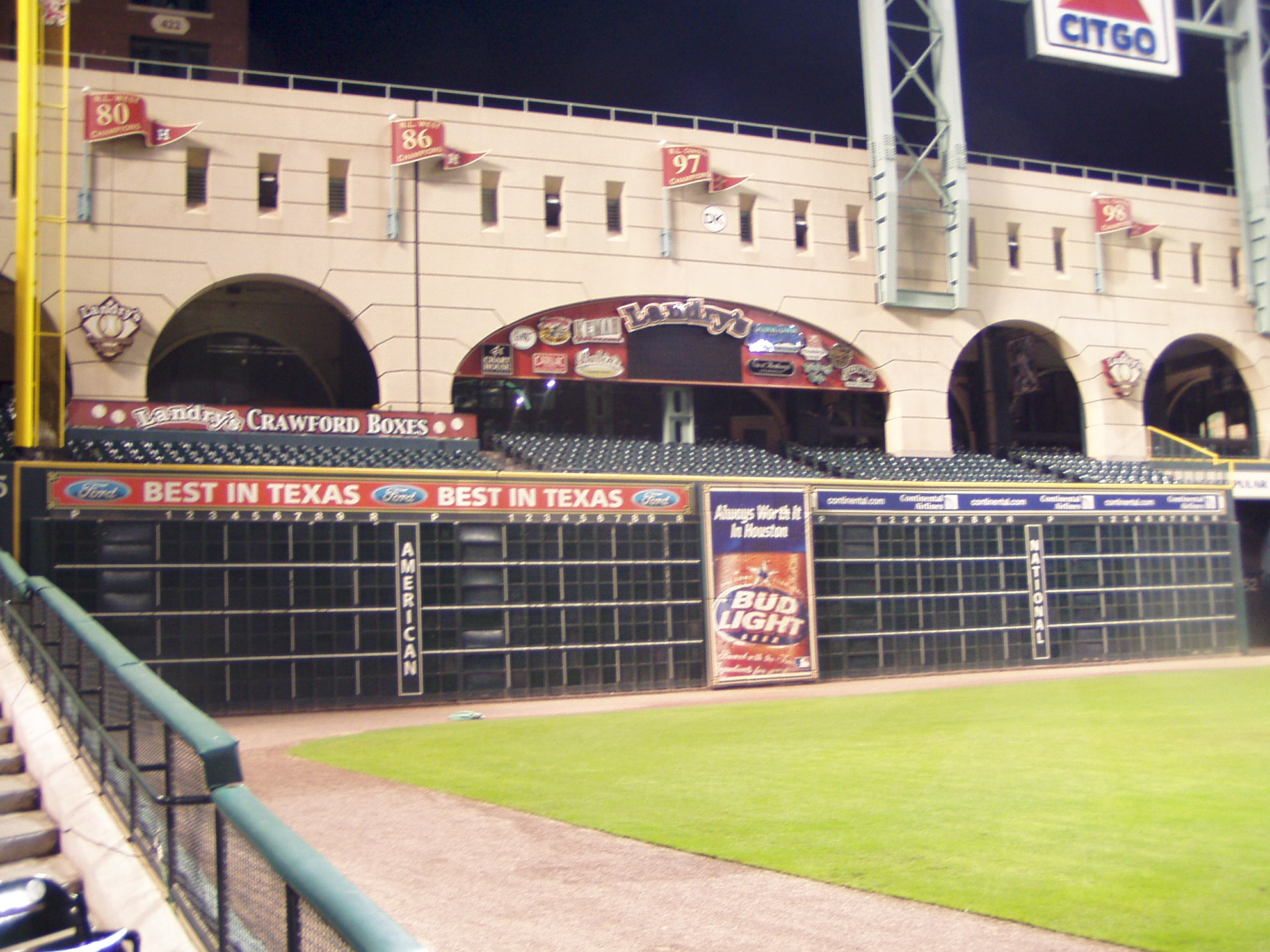
In 2003, Fertitta bought the naming rights to the Crawford Boxes at Daikin Park.

In 2003, Fertitta bought the naming rights to the Crawford Boxes seating section of Daikin Park, calling it "Landry's Crawford Boxes". The term has become a commercial moniker during radio and television broadcasts. A Landry's sign is placed above the section, along with many of the company's subsidiaries. Traditionally, when a fan catches a home run, they are awarded a gift certificate to one of Landry's restaurants. Landry's promoters often visit the section and give away items such as T-shirts.

==== NHL ====
After Fertitta bought the Rockets and Toyota Center in 2017, he expressed interest in an expansion team or relocating an NHL team to Houston, with both options most likely playing at Toyota Center. In 2018, he held preliminary talks with commissioner Gary Bettman to discuss ownership of a team. It was speculated he was working on a deal to purchase the Arizona Coyotes prior to their deactivation in 2024. Fertitta has continually stated his interest in owning a hockey team and believes that one would boost the economy of downtown Houston. In September 2024, it was reported by Andy Strickland that for the upcoming board of governors meeting regarding expansion, Houston was one of the leading candidates for expansion, with Fertitta's bid being the frontrunner for the city. In June 2026, the NHL Board of Governors announced during its meeting that it planned to see if it would award a team to Houston, however they met with Dan Friedkin who lead with a rival bid that proposed a new arena. Despite this, Fertitta has said he has no problem with the team being a tenant at Toyota Center.

==== Comets ====
In 2024, Fertitta expressed interest in bringing back a WNBA franchise to Houston, which would be their second team since the Houston Comets folded in 2008. This was later achieved on March 27, 2026, when Fertitta bought the Connecticut Sun and relocated them to Houston, reviving the Houston Comets for the 2027 season.

==== Sheffield Wednesday ====
As of 11 July 2025, Fertitta was reported to be seeking to acquire English EFL Championship club Sheffield Wednesday from owner Dejphon Chansiri, who has faced sustained criticism from supporters. The club, which competes in the second tier of English football, has experienced significant financial distress in 2025, including repeated failures to pay players and staff. These issues have resulted in sanctions from football authorities, including a transfer embargo extending to at least 2027 and restrictions on player wages, measures expected to remain in place regardless of any ownership change. Several potential buyers have been linked to the club in media reports, and negotiations have been marked by public disputes over valuation and process. According to multiple English sports journalists, Fertitta is believed to be the only bidder to have had an offer accepted and to have entered advanced negotiations, though the outcome remains uncertain.

=== Investments ===
Fertitta partnered with Richard Handler and announced a special-purpose acquisition company called Landcadia, a portmanteau of Fertitta's Landry's and Handler's Leucadia. The company plans to raise as much as $300 million in initial public offering. On May 16, 2018, Fertitta announced that Landcadia would acquire Waitr. On March 1, 2024, it was reported that Fertitta had purchased the River Oaks District, one of Houston's most prominent mixed-use developments, for $450 million.

== Politics and government service ==
On October 4, 2019, the Houston Rockets general manager Daryl Morey issued a tweet that supported the 2019–20 Hong Kong protests which drew criticism from Fertitta who said that while Morey was the best general manager in the NBA, the Rockets were not a political organization. Morey later deleted the tweet. In April 2020, Governor Greg Abbott named Fertitta to the Strike Force to Open Texas – a group "tasked with finding safe and effective ways to slowly reopen the state" during the COVID-19 pandemic.

Fertitta is known to support political leaders in both the Republican and Democratic parties. In particular, Fertitta has been a supporter of both Bill Clinton and the Bush family. Together with his spouse, Fertitta contributed $140,000 to Donald Trump's 2020 presidential campaign and $5,600 to Joe Biden's 2020 presidential campaign. In the 2024 presidential election season, he gave $13,200 to the Kamala Harris campaign, and around $500,000 to a political action committee for Donald Trump, and at least $1 million to the 2025 presidential inauguration committee. He also funded the reelection campaign for many state Republicans in 2022, notably donating over $1.1 million to Greg Abbott. Mark Kelly, a Democrat and United States Senator from Arizona, was considered to be a friend of Fertitta per a 2011 article according to the Houston Chronicle.

=== U.S. ambassador to Italy and San Marino ===
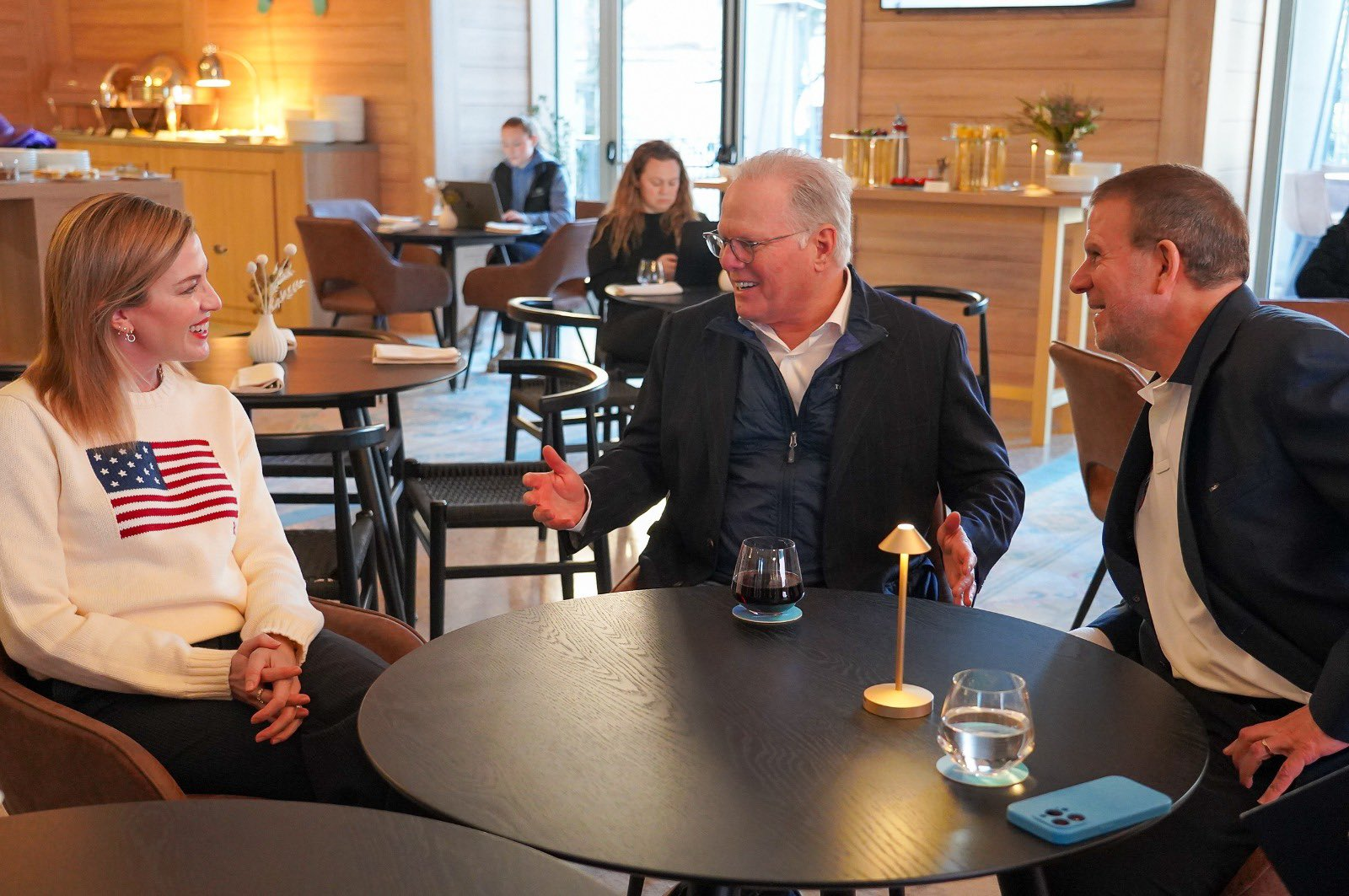
Fertitta (right) during a meeting with Warner Bros. Discovery CEO and president David Zaslav (center) in February 2026

On December 21, 2024, President-elect Donald Trump announced the nomination of Fertitta, whom he has referred to as his "twin", to serve as the United States ambassador to Italy and San Marino.

The United States Senate confirmed Fertitta's nomination on April 29, 2025, in an 83–14 vote. He presented his credentials to Italian President Sergio Mattarella on May 6, 2025.

In July 2026, on a diplomatic coastal tour of Italy, Fertitta brought his superyacht Boardwalk to Venice and incited local protests against "arrogance" and American international politics.

== Media ==
=== Television ===
On January 12, 2016, it was announced that Fertitta would star in his own reality TV show titled Billion Dollar Buyer on CNBC. Billion Dollar Buyer premiered on March 22, 2016, at 10 P.M. Eastern Time. After the first season was successful, a second season was announced, featuring more episodes.

=== Books ===
On September 17, 2019, Fertitta released a book, Shut Up and Listen! Hard Business Truths That Will Help You Succeed, in which he details his journey to success and offers advice to other entrepreneurs on their business ventures.

== Personal life ==
In 1991 Fertitta married Paige Farwell with whom he has four children, a daughter and three sons. Fertitta is now married to Houston attorney Lauren Ware. He is second-cousin to former UFC owners Lorenzo and Frank Fertitta. An avid sports fan, Fertitta is a vocal supporter of the University of Houston Cougars and can be seen at most Cougar football and men's basketball games as well as court side for Houston Rockets basketball games. In 2016, Fertitta donated $20 million to rebuild the University of Houston's basketball home of Hofheinz Pavilion, since renamed Fertitta Center, along with donations for the construction of TDECU Stadium. Fertitta is a close friend of retired NASA astronaut and Arizona senator Mark Kelly, and his wife, former Arizona congresswoman Gabby Giffords. He owns the 384-foot superyacht Boardwalk—the sixth vessel christened with that name.

== Philanthropy ==
Fertitta is chairman of the board of the Houston Children's Charity. In 2009, Texas Governor Rick Perry appointed Fertitta to the board of regents of the University of Houston System. In 2008, Fertitta was named chairperson of the Houston Police Department's Police Foundation, supplying gear and equipment for Houston Police Officers. He is on the executive committee for the Houston Livestock Show and Rodeo. He is a board member of the Texas Heart Institute, the Museum of Fine Arts, Houston, and the Greater Houston Partnership. In June 2022, The University of Houston College of Medicine received a $49.9 million pledge from Fertitta and the school was renamed the Tilman J. Fertitta Family College of Medicine.

Sporting positions
Preceded by Leslie Alexander	Houston Rockets owner 2017–present	Incumbent
Diplomatic posts
Preceded by Jack Markell	United States Ambassador to Italy; 2025–present	Incumbent
Preceded by Jack Markell	United States Ambassador to San Marino; 2025–present	Incumbent
