= Golden Nugget Biloxi =

Waterfront casino resort in Mississippi

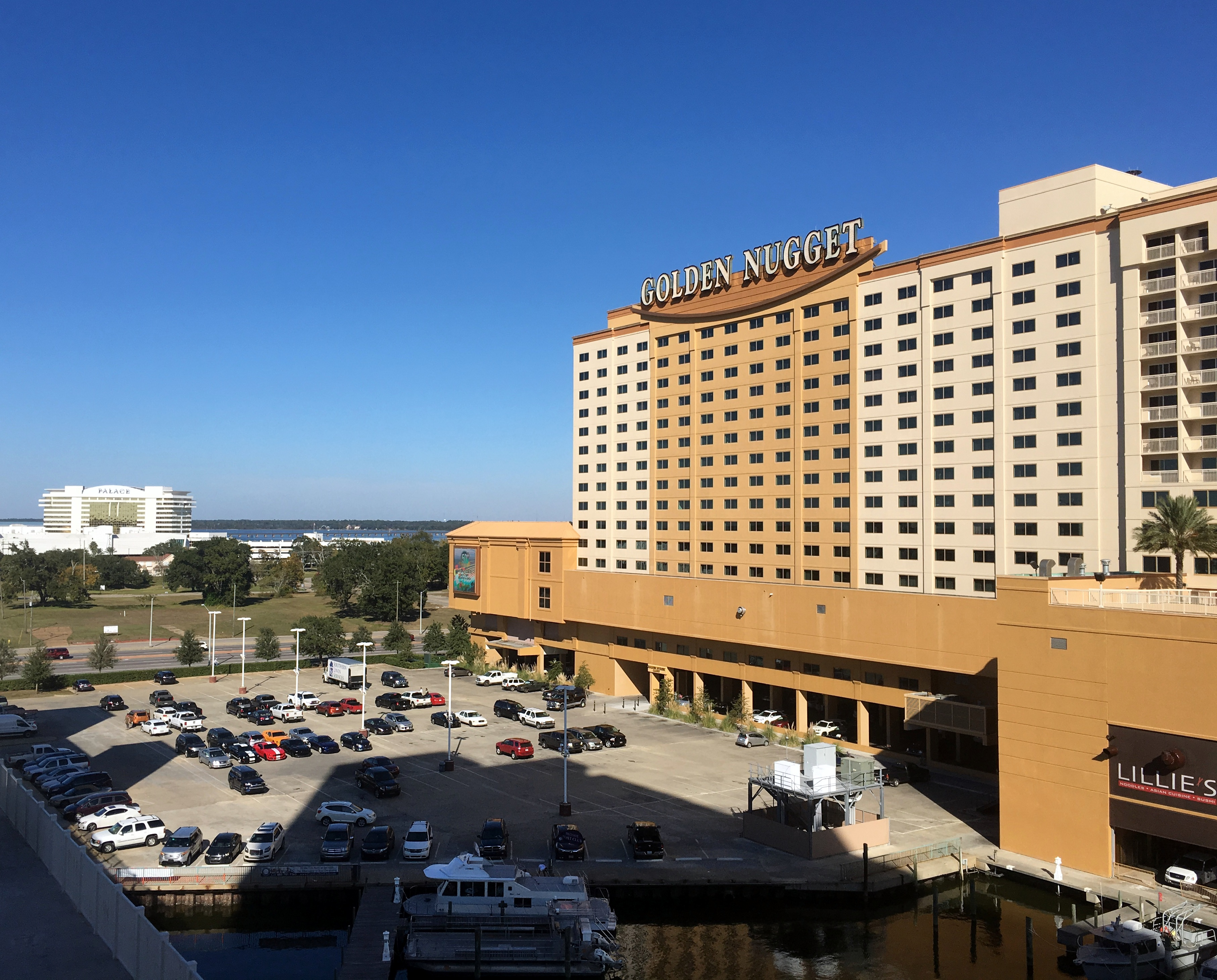
- Interactive map of Golden Nugget Biloxi
- Location: Biloxi, Mississippi; United States
- No. of rooms: 700
- Notable restaurants: Bubba Gump Shrimp Company; Saltgrass Steak House; Morton's The Steakhouse; Lillie's Asian Cuisine
- Owner: Fertitta Entertainment
- Coordinates: 30.3914°N 88.8608°W
- Website: goldennugget.com/biloxi

Golden Nugget Biloxi (formerly the Isle of Capri) is a casino resort in Biloxi, Mississippi. It is the oldest casino built in Biloxi. Along with the Margaritaville Resort Biloxi and the Harrah's Gulf Coast, the trio of casinos make up a district known as "Casino Row".

== History ==
The casino was originally built as the Isle of Capri. Following the introduction to legal gaming in Mississippi, it was the first casino in Biloxi as well as the original Isle of Capri branded casino. Bernard Goldstein originally established the company that would eventually become the Isle of Capri Casinos to build the casino. The company would later expand into other markets.

In 2005, the casino, but not the hotel, was destroyed by Hurricane Katrina.Its Biloxi casino (but not its hotel) was destroyed and its Lake Charles facilities damaged by Hurricane Katrina.

In 2012, the casino was sold to Fertitta Entertainment to be converted to a Golden Nugget.
