= Golden Nugget Hotel & Casinos =

American hotel and casino chain

Golden Nugget Hotels & Casinos
- Type: Subsidiary
- Industry: Hospitality; Gaming
- Founded: 1946; 80 years ago
- Founder: Steve Wynn
- Headquarters: The Post Oak, Houston, Texas, United States
- Number of locations: 6 (+1 Under Construction)
- Area served: United States
- Parent: Landry's
- Website: www.goldennugget.com

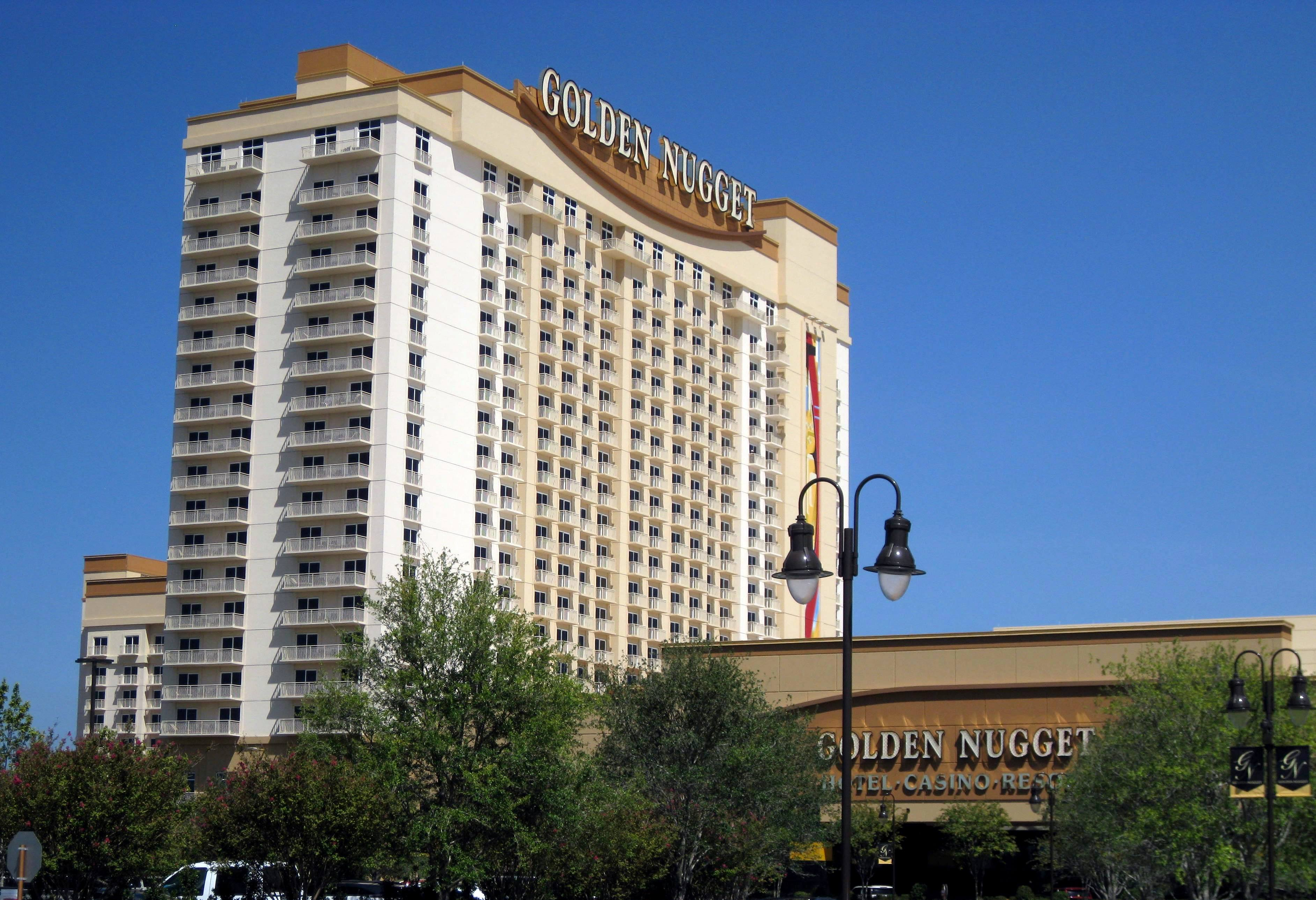
Golden Nugget Lake Charles in Lake Charles, Louisiana

Golden Nugget Hotels & Casinos is an American chain of luxury hotels and casinos. It currently operates eight casino resorts in Colorado, Nevada, Louisiana, New Jersey, Illinois, and Mississippi.

The original location was the Golden Nugget Las Vegas which opened in 1946. The company runs as a division of Landry's Hospitality within the Fertitta Entertainment portfolio.

== History ==
=== Original Golden Nugget ===
The Golden Nugget Las Vegas opened in 1946 in Downtown Las Vegas. Over time, notable members of the ownership group included Jackie Gaughan and Steve Wynn. Wynn later became the majority stakeholder in 1973, making him the youngest casino owner in Las Vegas. Under Wynn, the casino brand expanded significantly. After gaining the controlling share, Wynn created Golden Nugget Companies Inc. The first hotel tower opened in 1977, which led to the property receiving a four-diamond rating from Mobil Travel Guide.

In 1980, the company opened the Golden Nugget Atlantic City (not to be confused with the current Golden Nugget Atlantic City) in New Jersey. The Las Vegas casino also expanded, with a second and third tower opening in 1984 and 1989, respectively, which included a showroom. The company's interest in Atlantic City did not last long because of frustration with state gaming regulators, and in 1987, the property was sold to Bally's Entertainment, eventually becoming Bally's Grand Hotel and Casino. In 1989, the company acquired the Nevada Club casino in Laughlin, Nevada, and rebranded it as the Golden Nugget Laughlin.

=== Mirage Resorts (1989-1999) ===
The company expanded into the Las Vegas Strip in 1989, with the opening of The Mirage. Following the completion, the company changed its name to Mirage Resorts. Financing the $630 million project largely with high-yield bonds issued by Michael Milken. The resort's high cost and emphasis on luxury meant that it was considered high risk at the time, though the project ended up being enormously lucrative. The hotel, with its erupting volcano and South Seas theme, ignited a $12 billion building boom on the Strip. Its construction is also considered noteworthy in that Wynn had set a new standard for Vegas resorts, and when it opened The Mirage was the first casino to use security cameras full-time on all table games. Known for its entertainment, the hotel became the exclusive venue for the Siegfried & Roy show in 1990, and in 1993 the hotel hosted the Cirque du Soleil show Nouvelle Expérience. Afterwards Wynn decided to invite Cirque to create Mystère for the soon-to-be-built Treasure Island resort next door. The company would later open other notable projects such as the Treasure Island Hotel and Casino and the Bellagio.

=== Acquisition by MGM Resorts ===
The company was acquired in 2000 by MGM Grand Inc., which then changed its name to MGM Mirage, for $6.4 billion, including $2 billion in assumed debt, after an initial all-cash offer of $17 per share and a final offer of $21 per share. The company was majority owned by Wynn. Although the Golden Nugget was profitable, it was not part of the master expansion plan of the corporation which was focused on consolidating a long stretch of the Strip, so MGM looked to sell the Golden Nugget.

=== Poster Financial Group ===
Timothy Poster and Thomas Breitling, two young (mid-30s) entrepreneurs, formed Poster Financial Group as a private investment firm. When the company was founded, its initial investors included travelscape.com, an internet travel site. Tennis star Andre Agassi, a Las Vegas native, was also an investor.

Poster and Breitling had no casino ownership experience before acquiring the Golden Nugget. They faced some difficulty in obtaining the necessary casino licenses because of their friendship with Rick Rizzolo, a strip club owner being investigated by the FBI and because of Poster's uncle who was denied a gaming license because of his alleged association with known illegal bookmakers. The Nevada Gaming Control Board recommended that they be licensed for only one year. The board however, issued them four-year licenses, with an option to apply for permanent licenses in January 2005.

==== Acquisition of the Golden Nugget casinos ====
In January 2004 the company acquired the Golden Nugget Las Vegas and the Golden Nugget Laughlin for approximately $215 million. When Poster and Breitling assumed control of the Golden Nugget, they began to upgrade the gambling operation, by installing new "cashless" slot machines and increasing the maximum bet at table games to $15,000. Their story became the basis for The Casino, a television series on Fox, which premiered on June 14, 2004.

The Poster Financial Group's ownership encountered some difficulties. The television series received ratings below expectations and was canceled after one season. In addition, the strategy of attracting higher level casino players created significant volatility in the first year of operations.

On November 10, 2004 Barrick Gaming Corporation, which owns casino/hotels in downtown Las Vegas including The Plaza, The Vegas Club, The Western, and The Gold Spike, announced that it would acquire the Golden Nugget Laughlin for $31 million plus working capital. As part of the purchase agreement, Poster Financial granted Barrick a two-year limited use of the Golden Nugget brand name, after which Barrick will be required to change the name of the property.

=== Acquisition by Fertitta Entertainment ===
On February 4, 2005, Houston based Landry's Restaurants, Inc., now a subsidiary of Fertitta Entertainment, agreed to purchase the Golden Nugget Las Vegas for $140 million in cash plus the assumption of $155 million of debt.

On May 31, 2005 the agreement for Barrick Gaming to acquire the Golden Nugget Laughlin expired without a final deal being reached. As a result, Landry's acquired the property as part of its agreement to purchase the Golden Nugget Las Vegas. There was no increase in the purchase price as a result of this change since the money from the sale would have been used to reduce the debt on the Las Vegas property; instead, Landry's assumed that debt as well. On September 27, 2005 Landry's completed the acquisition of Poster Financial for approximately $318 million.

In 2022, Golden Nugget announced the acquisition of the Wildwood Casino and Hotel in Cripple Creek, Colorado, with plans to rebrand it under the Golden Nugget brand. The same year, the company broke ground on a casino in Danville, Illinois in a partnership deal with Wilmot Gaming. The following year, Fertitta Entertainment agreed to buy the Hard Rock Hotel & Casino Lake Tahoe, with plans to convert it to a Golden Nugget.

== Properties ==
- Golden Nugget Atlantic City
- Golden Nugget Biloxi
- Golden Nugget Danville, IL
- Golden Nugget Lake Charles
- Golden Nugget Lake Tahoe
- Golden Nugget Las Vegas
- Golden Nugget Laughlin
- Golden Nugget Cripple Creek, CO

== Other ventures ==
=== Golden Nugget Online ===
The Golden Nugget first launched its online casino in New Jersey. It has since spun-off into its own publicly traded company with plans to expand. Golden Nugget's parent, Landry's, Inc., remains the largest stockholder of Golden Nugget Online.

=== Golden Nugget Club ===
The Toyota Center contains a Golden Nugget Club, a lounge and bar that bring the Golden Nugget theme to the arena.
