= ASAP (food delivery) =

On-demand restaurant food delivery service

ASAP Inc.
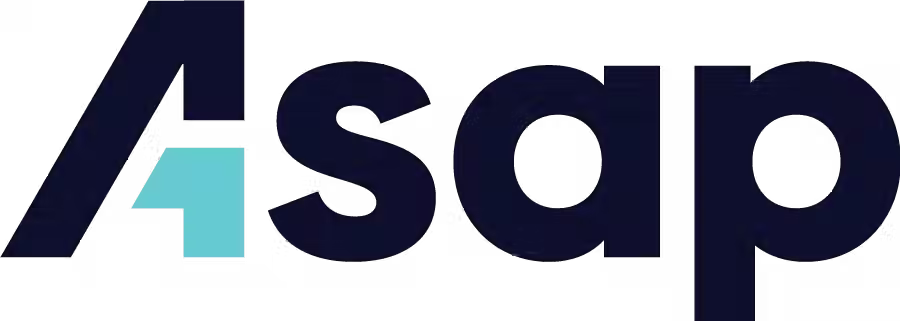
- Type: Public
- Traded as: Nasdaq: ASAP
- Industry: Online food ordering; Online grocery delivery
- Founded: 2013; 13 years ago
- Founders: Christopher Meaux (Chairman); Addison Killebrew (Chief Innovation Officer); Evan Diaz De Arce; Manuel Rivero (Chief Architect); Adam Murnane
- Defunct: April 7, 2024; 2 years ago
- Fate: Chapter 7 bankruptcy liquidation
- Headquarters: Lafayette, Louisiana
- Area served: United States
- Key people: Carl Grimstad (CEO)
- Owner: Fertitta Entertainment (majority)
- Subsidiaries: Requested; Delivery Dudes; Bite Squad; Homer Logistics
- Website: asap.com

ASAP Inc., stylized Asap, was an American online and mobile prepared food ordering and delivery and grocery delivery company. It originated in Lake Charles, Louisiana, where it was founded in 2013 as Waitr, Inc. by Chris Meaux with support from McNeese State University. The company was headquartered in Lafayette, Louisiana.

== History ==
Waitr traces its roots to Startup Weekend Gainesville in October 2013 at the University of Florida. Chris Meaux, who had traveled to the event with a goal of bringing Startup Weekend to Lake Charles, Louisiana, met students Addison Killebrew and Evan Díaz de Arce there. Together, using the Lean Business Model Canvas, their team built a mobile ordering concept allowing users to place orders via an app which sent them directly into the kitchen. They won the competition by conducting hundreds of student surveys during the 48-hour sprint and securing a pending contract with Big Lou's NY Style Pizzeria in Gainesville, Florida, a validation of their idea.

Following the event, Meaux returned to Lake Charles and, with support from McNeese State University faculty, recruited two technical students—Manuel Rivero and Adam Murnane—to complete the five-person founding team:

- Adam Murnane – iOS Mobile
- Addison Killebrew – Growth / Product
- Chris Meaux – Fundraising / Leadership
- Evan Díaz de Arce – Finance / Operations
- Manuel Rivero – Architecture, Web & Infrastructure

The team's first hire was Garrett Zinke, brought in from Carnegie Mellon to lead early Android development. They also made an early, now standard industry decision to hire a professional food photographer Daniel Edwards to photograph all menu items and feature them in the app.

In 2014 the founders experimented with table-side ordering but found customer behavior was not yet ready. They pivoted to carry-out ordering, and secured their first order from a stranger, a critical “first sale” moment. When delivery was tested next, demand surged. The founders themselves often made deliveries during peak hours until operations could scale.

This marked the beginning of rapid expansion: Waitr adopted a Blue Ocean Strategy, launching city-by-city across the South.

In 2018, the company was acquired through a $308 million reverse takeover by Tilman Fertitta's Lancadia holdings, which is part of the Fertitta Entertainment portfolio. In January 2019, Waitr acquired Minneapolis-based Bite Squad for $321 million, which effectively doubled Waitr's size. Bite Squad founder Kian Salehi stayed on for several months post-acquisition before leaving the company.

In 2019, the company announced it would lay off all of its employed drivers, and move to a contract-only model, similar to Grubhub and DoorDash. The move resulted in 2,300 drivers being laid off.

Carl Grimstad was appointed Waitr's CEO in 2020 and tasked with recovering the company after a US$291 million net loss in 2019. Despite the significant increase in footprint it gained from the Bite Squad acquisition, Waitr still only had a 3% share of the US food delivery market. Grimstad focused on differentiating the company from its competitors, especially DoorDash, Uber Eats, and Grubhub.

In 2021, Waitr made several major acquisitions. It bought Florida-based food delivery service Delivery Dudes in March for about US$23 million. It acquired three payment processing companies all focused on cannabis dispensaries: ProMerchant, Flow Payments in March, and Cape Cod Merchant Services. Waitr also attempted to purchase Retail Innovation Labs Inc, makers of the Cova POS and inventory platforms, for US$90 million in December, however, the acquisition was not completed.

== Rebranding ==
The company announced in January 2022 that later in the year it would be rebranding itself ASAP and shift focus to non-restaurant deliveries, particularly cannabis. The company expected to begin cannabis deliveries in Canada by the end of the year. The renaming and a payment of US$4.7 million were part of a settlement with Waiter.com who had sued Waitr over trademark infringement. Waiter.com had been founded in 1995 and trademarked its name in 2000, 8 years before Waitr's founding.

On March 30, 2024, ASAP announced it would cease operations. On April 2, 2024, Waitr Holdings declared Chapter 7 bankruptcy liquidation.
