= Mastro's Restaurants =

American fine dining steakhouse

- Company type: Subsidiary
- Industry: fine dining
- Founded: 1999; 27 years ago in Scottsdale, Arizona, U.S.
- Headquarters: Houston, Texas, United States
- Number of locations: 19
- Area served: Arizona, California, Illinois, Florida, Massachusetts, Nevada, Texas
- Parent: Landry's, Inc. (2013–present)
- Website: www.mastrosrestaurants.com

Mastro's Restaurants is an American fine dining steakhouse chain known for its ultra-high prices, selective locations, and celebrity clientele. Since 2013, the restaurant is part of the Landry's, Inc. portfolio.

== History ==
Mastro's first opened in 1999 in Scottsdale, Arizona. In 2007, the restaurant group was acquired by private equity firms Kinderhook Industries LLC and Soros Strategic Partners LP with plans to expand. In 2013, Mastro's Restaurants was acquired by Landry's, Inc. Then mostly a Western US chain, the company expanded east to New York City, Boston, and Ft. Lauderdale, Florida.

The first New York City location opened in 2014 on Sixth Avenue. In 2017, Mastro's opened their first locations in Houston and Boston. The Houston location opened at the Post Oak Hotel and Tower which is also owned by Landry's, Inc. The next year, a location opened in Fort Lauderdale, Florida.

The Post Oak Hotel location was the recipient of Wine Spectator’s highest restaurant award.
