= River Oaks District =

Coordinates: 29.7427°N 95.4535°W

- Location: Houston, Texas, United States
- Address: 4444 Westheimer Road
- Opened: October 1, 2015 (11 years ago)
- Developer: OliverMcMillan
- Owner: Fertitta Entertainment
- Num. of stores: 60+
- Floor area: 252,000 sq ft (23,400 m^{2})
- Floors: 1
- Website: https://www.riveroaksdistrict.com/

River Oaks District is an open-air luxury shopping complex in Houston, Texas, which opened October 1, 2015. It consists of 252,000 square feet of retail space with an iPic movie theater. Stores include Brioni, Hermès, Cartier, Dior, Harry Winston, Loro Piana, Patek Philippe, Dolce & Gabbana, Van Cleef & Arpels, Brunello Cucinelli, Carolina Herrera, Rolex, Stefano Ricci, Adam Lippes, Pucci, Saint Bernard and Zimmermann.

The layout is designed for strolling with heavily landscaped walkways, tree-lined streets, and curbside and garage parking. Restaurants and cafes are distributed throughout.

March 1, 2024, River Oaks District was purchased by Houston Hospitality Business mogul and NBA Houston Rockets owner, Tilman Fertitta.
