= Golden Nugget Casino DS =

2005 video game

- Developer: Skyworks Interactive
- Publisher: Majesco
- Platform: Nintendo DS
- Release: 2005
- Genre: Video game compilation
- Mode: Single-player

Golden Nugget Casino DS is a 2005 video game developed by American studio Skyworks Interactive and released by Majesco for the Nintendo DS. The game, named for the Las Vegas casino of the same name, is the first Golden Nugget themed game released for the DS. A prior game was released for the Game Boy Advance in 2004 (this Game Boy Advance game was later released again in 2005 as a 2 Games in 1 pack along with Texas Hold Em Poker), and another prior game was released for the Nintendo 64 (called Golden Nugget 64) back in 1998, preceded by a prior game for the PlayStation back in 1997 and the PC back in 1996.

The player begins with $2,000.00. Although the cartridge saves a player's winnings, a player can reset the amount to $2,000.00 at any point.

== Games ==
The following games are included:

- Blackjack
- Craps
- North Slots
- South Slots
- Money Wheel
- Video poker
- Roulette

When a game is selected, the game offers several betting limits to choose from, as well as three of each version of slots and video poker.

== Reception ==
Craig Harris of IGN gave the game a 5.0 out of 10, writing "(T)here's really nothing 'broken' about Golden Nugget Casino. It's just that the developer didn't exactly go above and beyond the call. All you're getting is the ability to play these casino games in a single player fashion".
