= Tim Poster =

- Born: c. 1968

Tim Poster (born c. 1968) is an American entrepreneur best known for the travel and leisure startup called Travelscape which was sold for over $89,000,000 in 2000, and at one time owning the Golden Nugget Las Vegas before selling to Landry's Inc. for $140,000,000.

== Biography ==
Tim Poster has a history in the casino gaming industry dating back to Poster attended Bishop Gorman High School in Las Vegas in the early 1980's, along with other notable figures such as Lorenzo Fertitta. Poster became close friends with Tom Breitling as part of their venture together to buy and run the iconic Las Vegas casino, the Golden Nugget, another venture that returned a profit for both Breitling and Poster after selling for $140 million to Tilman Fertitta after only 18 months of ownership (2004–2005). The timing was particularly fortunate for Poster since only a short couple years after that sale the economy in the United States (and disposable income typically spent in casino resorts) would then dry up beginning around 2007 as part of the Great Recession. Poster was hired by Wynn Resorts c. 2008 along with Breitling, as a "Senior Vice Presidents of Strategy and Development" for Wynn Las Vegas, was then promoted for one month to Chief Operating Officer to replace Maurice Wooden in 2013, but the resigned without providing public comment.

Poster, along with the Fertitta family and Tom Breitling went into business together in 2010 to form Fertitta Interactive LLC which in turn created Ultimate Gaming, a firm focused on "...real money online games, social gaming and digital entertainment."

Poster (and Breitling) starred in a reality TV series about their running the Golden Nugget while they owned the property. Due to low ratings, the show was cancelled after about only around six episodes aired. Poster was entertained by high profile guests such as Steve Wynn, Jack Binion, Marc Schorr, David Chesnoff, and many others for his 50th birthday celebration in 2018.

== See also ==
- Golden Nugget Las Vegas
- Lorenzo Fertitta
- Sig Rogich
- Steve Wynn
- Tom Breitling
