= Nugget =

Nugget may refer to:

== Aircraft ==
- Bede BD-17 Nugget, a single-seat homebuilt monoplane
- Laister LP-15 Nugget, a single-seat glider aircraft

== Arts and entertainment ==
- Nugget, a character from Super Meat Boy Forever
- "Nugget", a song by Cake from the 1996 the album Fashion Nugget
- The Nugget, a 2002 comedy film

== Businesses ==
- Carson Nugget, a hotel and casino in Carson City, Nevada
- Nugget Casino Resort, a hotel and casino in Sparks, Nevada
- Nugget Markets, a California supermarket chain
- Wendover Nugget, a hotel and casino in West Wendover, Nevada

== Foods and beverages ==
- Nugget, a variety of hops
- Chicken nugget, a lump of breaded or battered chicken

== Newspapers ==
- North Bay Nugget, a daily newspaper in North Bay, Ontario, Canada
- Nugget Newspaper, a weekly newspaper in Sisters, Oregon
- The Nome Nugget, a weekly newspaper in Nome, Alaska
- Weekly Nugget (Tombstone), newspaper in Tombstone, Arizona (1879 to 1882)
- Weekly Nugget (Placerville), newspaper in Placerville, California

== People nicknamed Nugget ==
- H. C. Coombs (1906–1997), Australian economist and public servant
- Steve Davis (born 1957), snooker player
- Owen Hart (1965–1999), Canadian professional wrestler

== Places ==
- Nugget Creek
- Nugget Falls (Oregon), an alternate name for Dillon Falls in Southern Oregon
- Nugget Falls, a waterfall in Alaska
- Nugget Point, New Zealand

== Other uses ==
- Nugget (coin)
- Gold nugget, a naturally occurring piece of gold
- Nugget, a property of the variogram in statistics

== See also ==
- Golden nugget (disambiguation)
- Nuggets (disambiguation)
- Nougat, a variety of confectionery sometimes pronounced as "nugget"
- NuGet (software)
- Nuggett
