= Delivery Dudes =

American delivery service

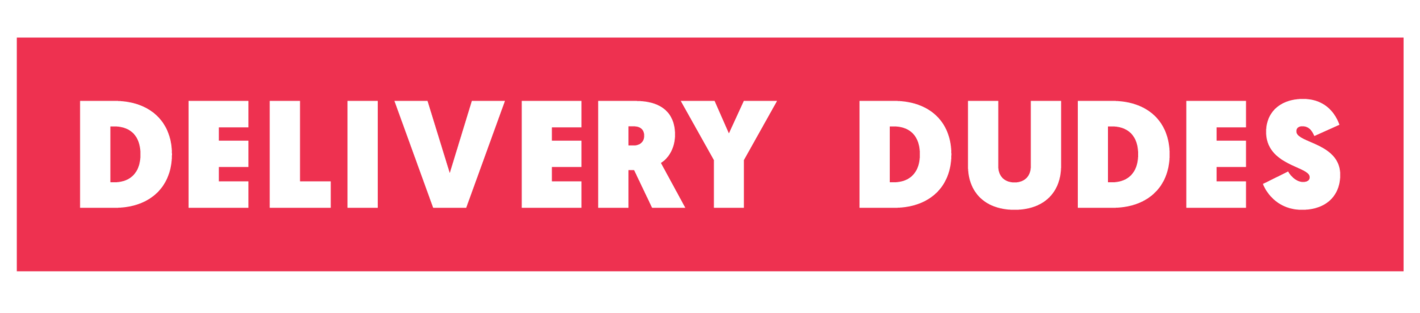
- Type: Private
- Industry: Online food ordering
- Founded: 2009; 17 years ago
- Founder: Jayson Koss
- Defunct: 2021; 5 years ago
- Fate: acquired by ASAP
- Headquarters: Delray Beach, Florida, United States
- Area served: South and southeast Florida
- Website: deliverydudes.com

Delivery Dudes was a Florida-based on-demand delivery service founded in 2009. The company delivered restaurant food, groceries, and prescriptions. It was acquired by Louisiana food delivery company Waitr in 2021. In its consolidation, the company changed its name to ASAP.

== History ==
Delivery Dudes was founded by Jayson Koss as Delray Delivery Dudes in Delray Beach, Florida in 2009. According to Koss, his "delivery service" was initially just himself on a moped delivering food and marijuana. After a slow start, the company gained pace in 2012.

In October 2015, the company introduced the "Dudes Liquor" service in Delray Beach to deliver alcoholic beverages and related supplies. At the time, Delivery Dudes had operations in 29 cities in Tennessee, Colorado, Oregon, Pennsylvania, and southern Florida. By mid-2016, it had approximately 2,000 drivers nationwide. At the time, the company had grown using a franchising model with about half of its locations being franchises and served 50 cities by late 2019.

"Dudes Bodega", a no-contact home delivery service for groceries, prescriptions, and other household goods, was introduced in May 2020 in East Delray Beach. The company eventually expanded the service across its markets in South Florida.

== Acquisition ==
In March 2021, Delivery Dudes agreed to sell its assets to Louisiana-based online restaurant pickup and delivery platform Waitr Holdings (Nasdaq: WTRH) for about US$23 million. The move was intended to accelerate Waitr's growth in Florida. Two months later, Delivery Dudes announced it was hiring 200 additional contract drivers in South Florida to handle growing demand. In 2022, Waitr changed its name to ASAP in light of recent consolidations and legal issues with Waiter.com.

== Corporate citizenship ==
As part of an effort to reduce its environmental impact, Delivery Dudes worked with 4ocean, an ocean cleanup group based in Boca Raton. Delivery Dudes offered its customers the option to forego single-use cutlery normally included with restaurant deliveries. The company raised more than $14,000 for the nonprofit organization Hospitality Helping Hands (H3) by donating the delivery fees it collected over two days in April 2020.

== Controversies ==
Delivery Dudes was the subject of a lawsuit filed by Delivery Dudes driver Justin Attai and others claiming they should be classified as employees instead of independent contractors. The suit alleged that the company violated the Fair Labor Standards Act by paying some drivers less than minimum wage and not paying required overtime. According to Delivery Dudes CEO Koss, these drivers were part of a franchise. The company settled the lawsuit in May 2016. The suit occurred at a time when a number of other delivery companies including Uber, GrubHub, Caviar, and DoorDash had been sued by drivers with similar complaints.
