= Golden Nugget Lake Tahoe =

Hotel and casino in Stateline, Nevada, US

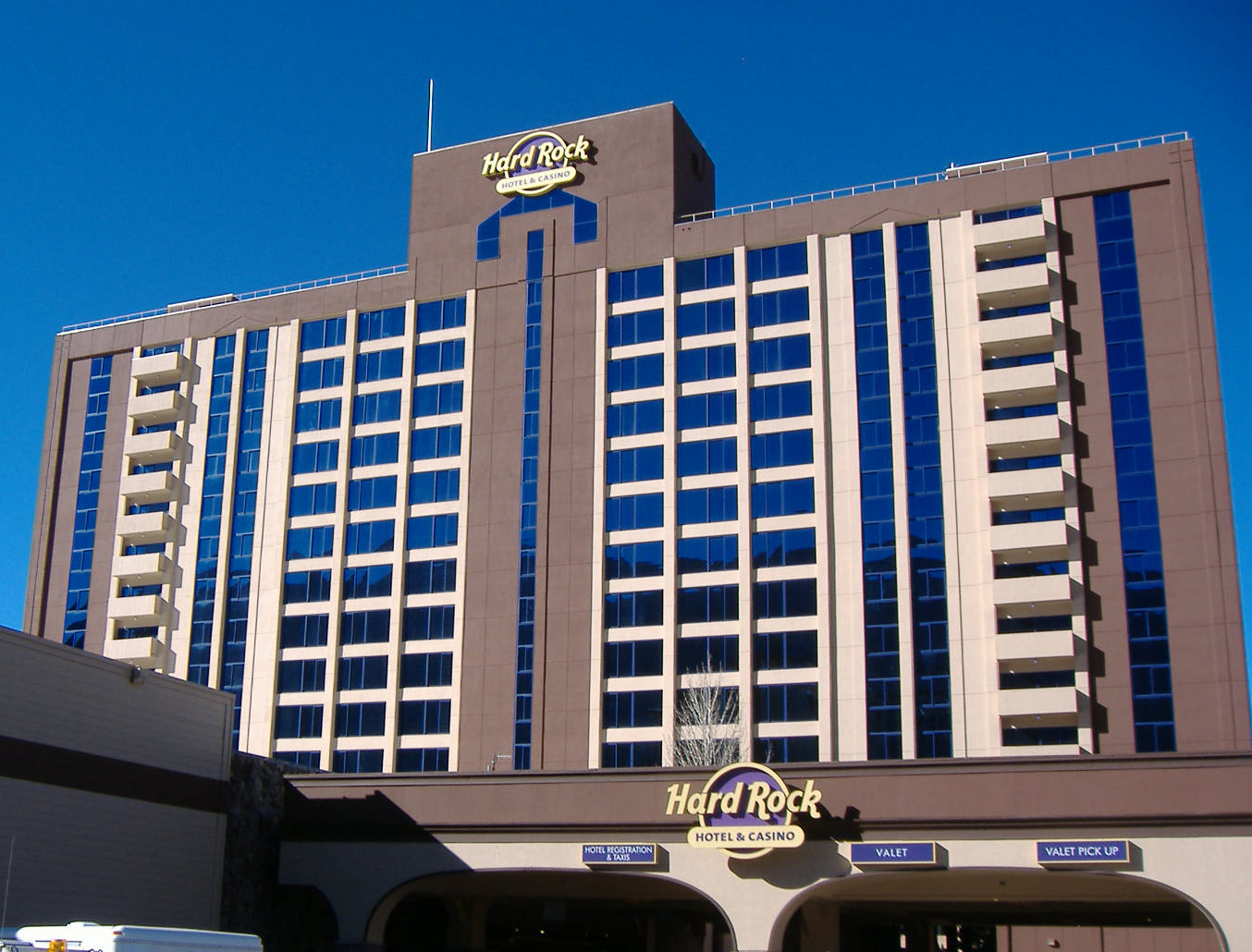
- The resort, then Hard Rock, in January 2015
- Interactive map of Golden Nugget Lake Tahoe
- Location: Stateline, Nevada, U.S.; 50 U.S. Route 50; 38.962362°N 119.940748°W
- Opened: June 30, 1965; 61 years ago
- Theme: Gold Rush
- No. of rooms: 539
- Gaming space: 22,750 sq ft (2,114 m^{2})
- Notable restaurants: Alpine Union; Fuel; Park Prime; The Oyster Bar
- Casino type: Land-based
- Owner: NevaOne, LLC / Park Companies
- Operating license holder: Fertitta Entertainment / Landry's
- Previous names: Sahara Tahoe (1965–1983); High Sierra (1983–1990); Horizon Lake Tahoe (1990–2014); Hard Rock Hotel & Casino Lake Tahoe (2014–2023)
- Renovated in: 1978, 1983, 1990, 2013–2014, 2023–2025
- Website: www.goldennugget.com/lake-tahoe

Golden Nugget Lake Tahoe Hotel & Casino (formerly Sahara Tahoe, High Sierra, Horizon Lake Tahoe, and Hard Rock Lake Tahoe) is a casino hotel in Stateline, Nevada. Horizon Lake Tahoe closed on April 1, 2014, to begin a $60 million renovation and rebranding as Hard Rock Lake Tahoe, which held its grand opening on January 28, 2015. It has 539 hotel rooms and 22,750 square feet (2,114 m^{2}) of gaming space, with 431 slot machines, 33 table games, and a new Golden Nugget Sportsbook.

== History ==
=== Sahara Tahoe (1965–1983) ===
Plans for the casino hotel were announced in January 1963 by the Del E. Webb Corporation, a real estate development firm that also owned casinos in Las Vegas, including the Sahara. Webb leased 20 acres (8.1 ha) of land for the development from the Park Cattle Co., a ranching company with large land holdings in the area. Construction began in April 1964. The property opened as the Sahara–Tahoe on June 30, 1965. Developed at a cost of $25 million, the Sahara had a 14-story hotel with 350 rooms and a 1,000-seat theater restaurant.

The Sahara expanded with a second hotel tower completed in late 1968, with 224 rooms on 8 floors.

Elvis Presley performed at the Sahara Tahoe from 1971 to 1976, and his suite is still available for guests to book.

=== High Sierra (1983–1990) ===
In 1983, the Sahara was given a Western theme and rebranded as the High Sierra Hotel/Casino.

In 1985, it hosted the companies who defined the High Sierra Format, the basis for how computers access CD-ROMs today.

=== Horizon Lake Tahoe (1990–2014) ===
In 1990, the High Sierra was sold to Columbia Sussex, which rebranded it again as Horizon.

In 2005, Park Cattle Co. moved to evict Columbia Sussex from the premises, alleging that they had allowed the Horizon to fall into disrepair. The ensuing lawsuit lasted until 2008, when Tropicana Entertainment (successor of Columbia Sussex's casino business) agreed to pay $165 million to Park Cattle and end the lease for the Horizon as early as 2011.

In 2009, Tropicana Entertainment transferred the lease and the operating business of the Horizon back to an affiliate of Columbia Sussex. Tropicana was undergoing a bankruptcy reorganization and hoped to focus its efforts on its neighboring MontBleu Casino.

In 2014, NevaOne LLC, a Park Cattle affiliate, acquired the Horizon's operations. NevaOne closed the Horizon for renovations on April 1, 2014, with plans to rebrand it as the Park Tahoe Casino Resort. Warner Gaming, which operated several casinos, including the Hard Rock Las Vegas, was retained to manage the property.

=== Hard Rock Hotel and Casino (2014–2023) ===
In July 2014, the Park family announced that the Horizon would be rebranded as the Hard Rock Hotel & Casino Lake Tahoe, instead of the Park Tahoe. The name was used under license from Brookfield Asset Management, which owned the original Las Vegas property and the rights to the Hard Rock brand in the Western United States. The property reopened as the Hard Rock on January 28, 2015, after $60 million of renovations.

Paragon Gaming acquired a majority stake in the property in 2016.

=== Golden Nugget Lake Tahoe (2023–present) ===
In 2023, Fertitta Entertainment bought the property from Paragon and announced that it would be rebranded as a Golden Nugget casino.

== Gallery ==
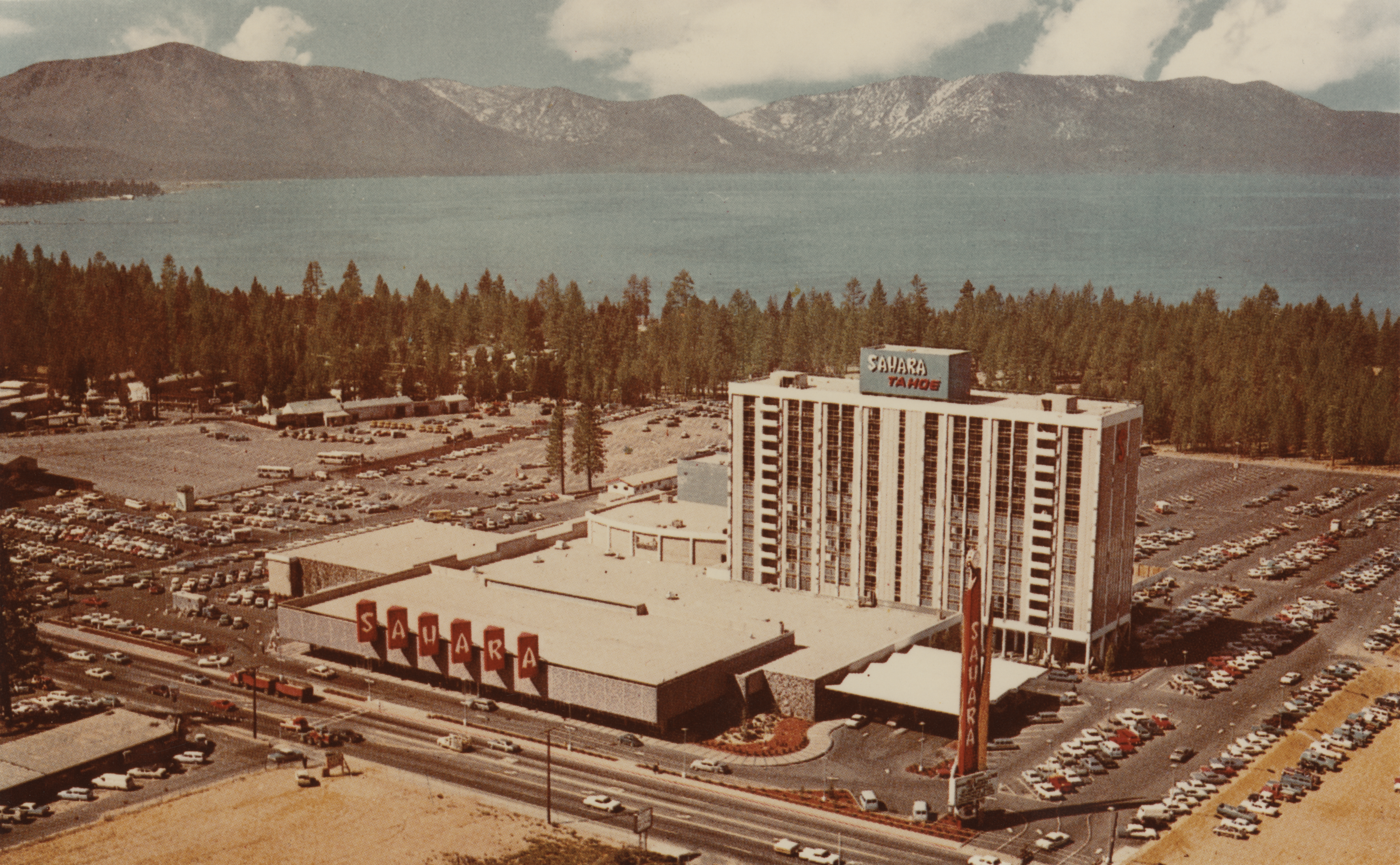
The Sahara–Tahoe, shortly after opening (circa 1965)

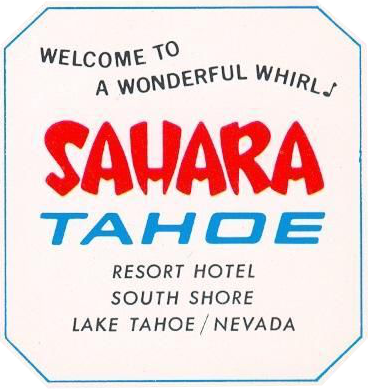
Sahara Tahoe logo (1965–1983)

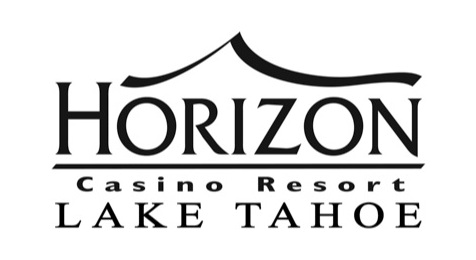
Horizon Lake Tahoe logo (1990–2014)

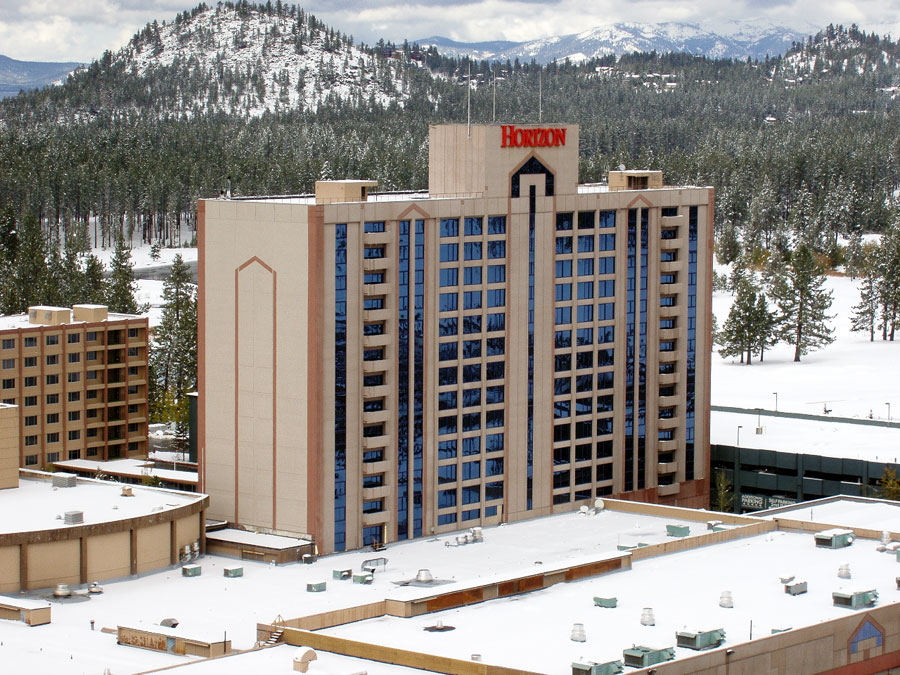
The hotel towers, as the Horizon (2006)

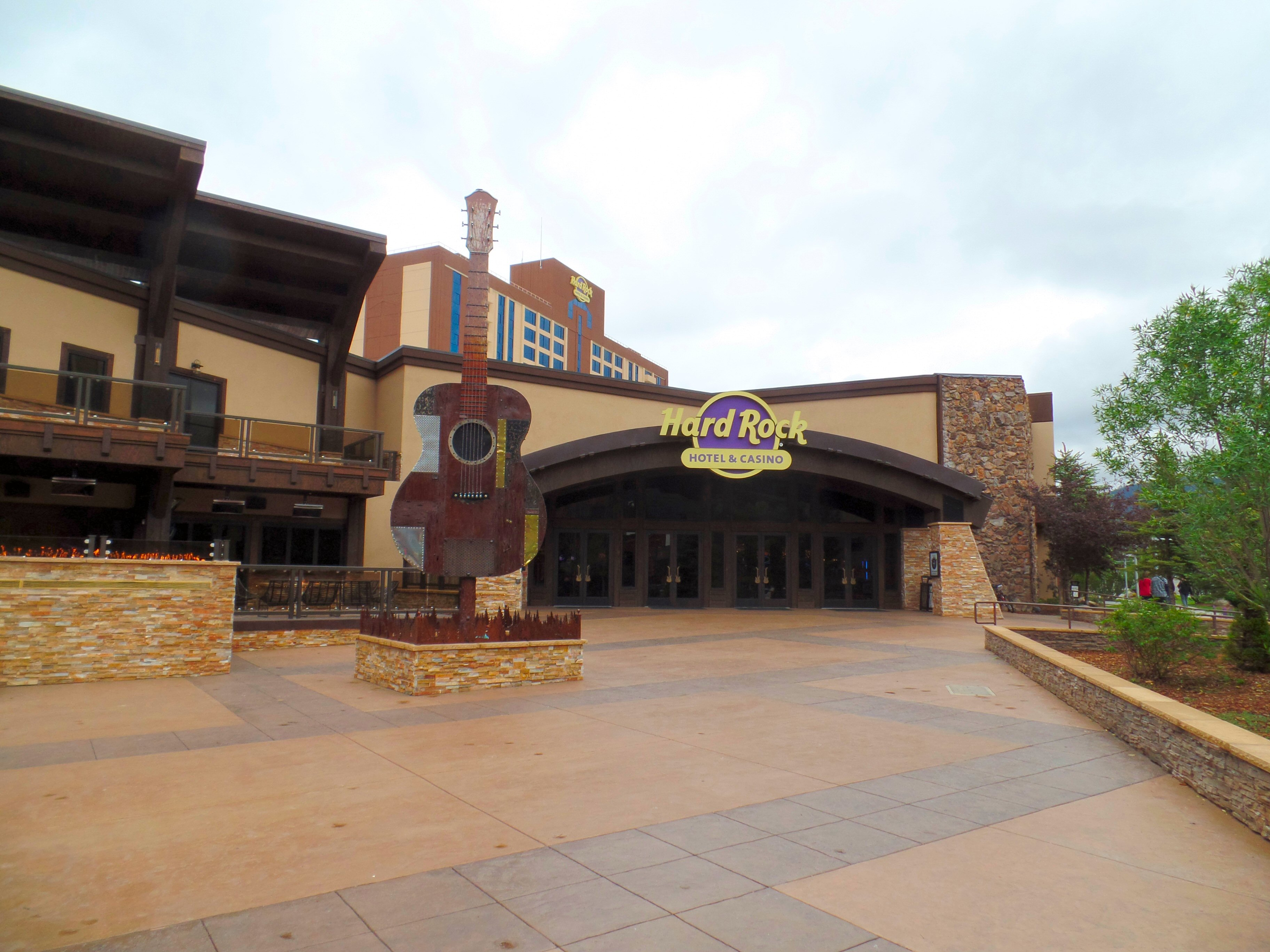
Entrance to the casino, as the Hard Rock (2015)

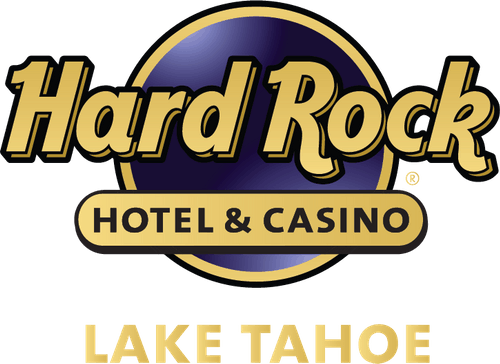
Hard Rock Hotel and Casino Lake Tahoe logo (2014–2023)

Golden Nugget Lake Tahoe logo (2023–present)

== See also ==
- Great Canadian Casino Vancouver, also former Hard Rock location
