= Golden Nugget 64 =

1998 video game

- Developer: Westwood Pacific
- Publisher: Electronic Arts
- Platform: Nintendo 64
- Release: NA: December 10, 1998
- Genre: Casino
- Modes: Single-player, multiplayer

Golden Nugget 64 is a 1998 virtual casino game developed by Westwood Pacific and published by Electronic Arts for the Nintendo 64. It is the only gambling/casino related game released in North America for the Nintendo 64. The game starts off by having the player create an account with $1000 which is saved on the controller pack. Players have the choice from one of ten different popular casino games. Each game has its own set of rules and a guide to learn how to play.

== Gameplay ==
The Golden Nugget Las Vegas hotel and casino is the setting for the following games:

- Blackjack: Achieve a total card value of 21 without exceeding it.
- Craps: Bet on the outcome of dice rolls.
- Five-card draw: Have the best hand after the final betting round.
- Roulette: Correctly predict the slot where the ball will land when the wheel stops spinning.
- Seven-card stud: Have the best hand compared to other opponents.
- Video poker: Create the best possible hand. Unlike other poker games, there are no opponents. The player wins a certain multiplier of the bet based on their hand. Only "Jacks or Better" video poker is included.
- Texas hold 'em: Have a better hand than the opponents.
- Big Six wheel: Similar to roulette, players predict the symbol on which the wheel will stop.
- Mini-Baccarat: Guess which hand is closer to a total of 9 without exceeding it.
- Slot machines: Match a winning combination of symbols, which vary from machine to machine. There are six different slot machines in the game: Card Bonanza, Catch of the Day!, Motherlode, Sports Fanatic!, Wheels of Fire!, and Miner 49er.

Other options include a "Big Winners" list and a slideshow of the actual Golden Nugget Las Vegas hotel and casino.

== Reception ==
Reception

Review scores
Publication	Score
Electronic Gaming Monthly	8.5/10, 6/10, 8/10, 6/10
GamePro	10.5/20
IGN	7.8/10
The Cincinnati Enquirer	2.5/4

IGN gave Golden Nugget 64 a score of 7.8 out of 10. Reviewer Peer Schneider noted that the game's graphics are appealing, the menu systems are well-designed, and the gameplay is enjoyable. However, the theme music was described as "nasty." The review emphasized that Golden Nugget 64 succeeds in providing a straightforward and fun gambling experience, with well-executed AI and good use of the N64's analog stick for controls. Despite not offering much in terms of atmosphere or immersive casino environments, the game was commended for its selection of gambling games and multiplayer mode, making it a notable title for those seeking a different gaming experience on the Nintendo 64.

GamePro's review of Golden Nugget 64 was critical, giving it scores of 3.0 out of 5 for graphics, 2.5 for sound, 3.0 for control, and 2.0 for fun factor. The review described the game as uninspired and poorly presented, with simplistic 3D graphics, dull sound, and disappointing controls. It was noted that while the game offered a wide variety of casino games, it lacked innovation and detailed organization, resulting in a monotonous experience.

== Other games ==
A previous game, Golden Nugget, was released for Microsoft Windows in 1996 and PlayStation in 1997. In 2004, a sequel, Golden Nugget Casino, was released for the Game Boy Advance. Golden Nugget Casino DS was released in 2006 for the Nintendo DS.
