= The Casino (American TV series) =

American reality television series

- Genre: Reality television
- Created by: Mark Burnett; James Bruce; Conrad Riggs
- Written by: James Bruce; Mark Burnett; Robert Lieberman
- Presented by: Richard Wilk; John Sunstrum
- Theme music composer: Bono and The Edge
- Opening theme: "Two Shots of Happy, One Shot of Sad"
- Country of origin: United States
- Original language: English
- No. of seasons: 1
- No. of episodes: 13

Production
- Production locations: Golden Nugget Hotel & Casino Las Vegas, Nevada, United States
- Running time: 44 mins.
- Production company: Mark Burnett Productions

Original release
- Network: Fox
- Release: June 14 – August 29, 2004

The Casino is an American reality television series broadcast on the Fox network in 2004 which followed two dot-com millionaires, Thomas Breitling and Tim Poster, as they manage the Golden Nugget Hotel & Casino, located in downtown Las Vegas instead of the more popular Las Vegas Strip.

The show was created by Mark Burnett, the creator of Survivor. It was canceled shortly before the last three episodes of the series could be broadcast due to dismal ratings. However, sister station Fox Reality Channel picked up The Casino and broadcast the unaired episodes and then ran the series in re-runs until its cancellation from that network.

== Production ==
Scenes of Tim Poster and Thomas Breitling were filmed around Las Vegas in January 2004. Filming at the Golden Nugget was initially scheduled to begin that same month. It was delayed and began instead on February 2, 2004.

Casinos such as the Aladdin Resort & Casino and Caesars Palace were initially considered rather than the Golden Nugget. An area of the Golden Nugget's casino was closed off to allow for filming of high-stakes gambling at a roulette wheel, a dice table, and four blackjack tables. The Casino was the first reality series to be shot with high-definition video cameras. Eighteen camera crews shot approximately 270 hours of footage for each hour-long episode. Executive producer James Bruce speculated that the show "could go on forever" because of its variety.

Other filming locations included the Las Vegas Strip and downtown Las Vegas. Filming at the Golden Nugget concluded on March 17, 2004, with additional background footage to be shot at a later time. The theme song, "Two Shots of Happy, One Shot of Sad", was written by Bono and The Edge, and performed by Matt Dusk.

== Broadcast ==
The Casino began airing on June 14, 2004. In July 2004, it was reported that The Casino was a ratings disappointment, and that Poster, Breitling, and employees did not like the show's portrayal of the Golden Nugget, including its "staged feel".

== See also ==
- List of television shows set in Las Vegas
