= Nuggets, Volume 9: Acid Rock =

Nuggets, Vol. 9: Acid Rock

Compilation album by various artists
- Released: 1985
- Genre: Acid rock
- Length: 44:04
- Label: Rhino

Professional ratings
Review scores
| Source | Rating |
|---|---|
| Allmusic | link |

Nuggets, Vol. 9: Acid Rock is a compilation album released by Rhino Records. It is the ninth in its series of twelve albums highlighting various music genres.

== Track listing ==
1. "7 and 7 Is" - Love – 2:15
2. "Eight Miles High" - The Byrds – 3:34
3. "Feelings" - The Grass Roots – 2:57
4. "Just Dropped In (To See What Condition My Condition Was In)" - The First Edition – 3:20
5. "Magic Carpet Ride" - Steppenwolf – 4:27
6. "It's Wonderful" - The Young Rascals – 3:21
7. "Porpoise Song" - The Monkees – 4:10
8. "She's My Girl" - The Turtles – 2:35
9. "Incense and Peppermints" - The Strawberry Alarm Clock – 2:47
10. "The Wind Blows Her Hair" - The Seeds – 2:30
11. "You Keep Me Hangin' On" - Vanilla Fudge – 2:59
12. "In-A-Gadda-Da-Vida" - Iron Butterfly – 2:53
13. "Time Has Come Today" - The Chambers Brothers – 3:52
14. "I Won't Hurt You" - The West Coast Pop Art Experimental Band – 2:24
