= Fertitta Entertainment =

American multinational hospitality company

Fertitta Entertainment Inc.
- Fertitta Entertainment headquarters in Houston
- Type: Conglomerate
- Industry: Entertainment
- Founded: 1986; 40 years ago
- Founder: Tilman Fertitta
- Headquarters: Post Oak Tower & Hotel, Houston, Texas, United States
- Area served: Worldwide
- Key people: Tilman Fertitta (CEO); Nikki Keenan (COO)
- Services: Hotels restaurants professional sports casinos food delivery Real estate amusement parks luxury cars
- Revenue: ▲US$4.7 billion (2018)
- Owner: Tilman Fertitta
- Subsidiaries: Landry's, Inc.; Houston Rockets; Golden Nugget Casinos; Waitr
- Website: fertittaentertainmentinc.com

Fertitta Entertainment is an American conglomerate and holding company that holds companies and investments owned by Tilman Fertitta. These include Landry's, Inc., the Houston Rockets, and the Golden Nugget casinos. Within the portfolio are many luxury hotels and well known restaurant brands such as Rainforest Café, Del Frisco's, Bubba Gump Shrimp Company, Morton's The Steakhouse, among others. Additionally, the company is the largest shareholder of food delivery app ASAP.

It is headquartered at The Post Oak tower in Uptown Houston. The company has achieved sponsorships and has been granted the naming rights to the Fertitta Center at the University of Houston. It purchased the Hard Rock Hotel & Casino Lake Tahoe in 2023, with plans to rebrand it as a Golden Nugget hotel.

Announced in March 2026, the company agreed to acquire Caesars Entertainment for $17.6 billion, including the assumption of $11.9 billion in debt.

== Portfolio and subsidiaries ==
- Landry's, Inc. (60%)
- Houston Rockets (100%)
- Golden Nugget Online (60%)
- Waitr

=== Hotels and Casinos ===
==== Golden Nugget ====
- Golden Nugget Atlantic City
- Golden Nugget Biloxi
- Golden Nugget Danville, IL
- Golden Nugget Lake Charles
- Golden Nugget Las Vegas
- Golden Nugget Laughlin
- Golden Nugget Cripple Creek, CO
- Golden Nugget Lake Tahoe, NV

==== Post Oak Hotels ====
- Post Oak Hotel and Tower - Houston
- Post Oak Las Vegas (Future)

==== Other ====
- Blue Water Inn - St. Clair, Michigan
- Harbor House Hotel, Galveston, Texas
- Huntting Inn - East Hampton, New York
- Boardwalk Inn - Kemah, Texas
- San Luis Resort - Galveston, Texas
  - The Villas at San Luis Resort

=== Post Oak Motor Cars ===
Fertitta Entertainment owns the luxury car dealership, Post Oak Motor Cars, which is located at the company's headquarters building at The Post Oak Hotel & Tower. It includes a Bentley, Rolls-Royce, Karma, and Bugatti dealership. Upon opening the Bugatti dealership in 2017, it became the first Bugatti dealership in Houston. Post Oak Motor Cars plans a second dealership location in The Woodlands, Texas. The dealership also provides used cars of brands besides the brands it's licensed to sell. For select guests, the Post Oak Motor Cars provides services to Fertitta's hotels in the Houston area and other businesses its partnered with. The company is home to Post Oak Power, an exclusive luxury car club that united owners in the Houston area.

=== Houston Rockets ===
On September 4, 2017, Tilman Fertitta agreed to purchase the Rockets from Leslie Alexander, pending league approval, for an NBA record $2.2 billion. On October 6, 2017, Fertitta was approved by the NBA to own the Houston Rockets.
