= Thomas Breitling =

American entrepreneur

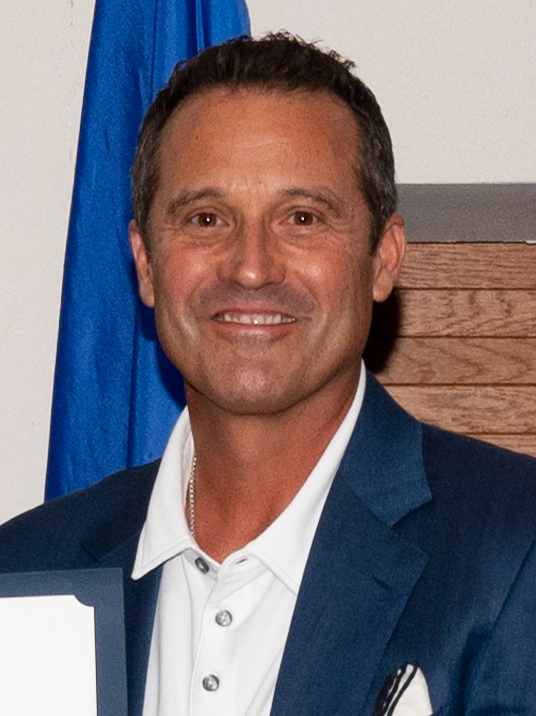
- Breitling in 2024
- Born: June 19, 1969 (age 57); St. Paul, Minnesota, U.S.
- Occupation: President of Breitling Ventures
- Website: www.tombreitling.com

Thomas Breitling (born June 19, 1969) is an American entrepreneur.

== Early life ==
Breitling was born in St. Paul, Minnesota. His father became a pilot for Northwest Airlines after serving in the United States Air Force. His mother was a nurse. Breitling was educated at St. John the Baptist in Savage, Minnesota through the eighth grade. He then went on to the Academy of Holy Angels in Richfield, Minnesota, where he attended high school and played basketball. He then went on to study at the University of San Diego, California. He was a member of the Sigma Pi fraternity and graduated with a degree in Communications, with a minor in Business Administration, in 1991.

== Career ==
Breitling began as a weatherman for KHIZ, then was promoted to sports anchor. In 1993 Tim Poster asked him to help him run his startup company, Las Vegas Reservation Systems. Breitling served as its vice president until he co-founded Travelscape.com in March 1998. Travelscape.com grossed $104 million in sales in 1999, from just $800,000 in sales in 1990. Breitling and Poster sold Travelscape to Expedia for over $89,750,000.

From June 2003 to September 2005, Breitling served as vice-chairman of the Golden Nugget Las Vegas properties in Las Vegas and Laughlin, Nevada. Breitling and Poster acquired the Golden Nugget properties in June 2003 for $215 million; their running of the casino was the subject of the reality television show The Casino. In September 2005, they sold the Golden Nugget for approximately $340 million.

Breitling has published his autobiography, Double or Nothing in 2008.

Tom Breitling and Tim Poster joined Wynn Resorts subsidiary Wynn Las Vegas as Senior Vice Presidents of Strategy and Development in July 2008.

In 2010, Tom Breitling co-founded Ultimate Gaming with Lorenzo and Frank Fertitta. The goal of Ultimate Gaming was to bridge the gap between land based casinos and online gaming to bring our players the Ultimate Gaming Experience. In April 2013, Breitling's company launched the first ever, legal and regulated online poker site in the United States- Ultimate Poker. On April 30, 2013, Ultimate Poker dealt the first ever legal hand of online poker in the state of Nevada. Breitling then, successfully launched Ultimate Casino inside the State of New Jersey in November 2013.

== Personal life ==
Breitling married model/actress Vanessa Tarazona in a lavish ceremony on September 12, 2007, in Lake Como, Italy.

== See also ==
- Steve Wynn
- Tim Poster
