= The Nuggets =

Island group in Tasmania, Australia

Coordinates: 42°07′S 148°20′E

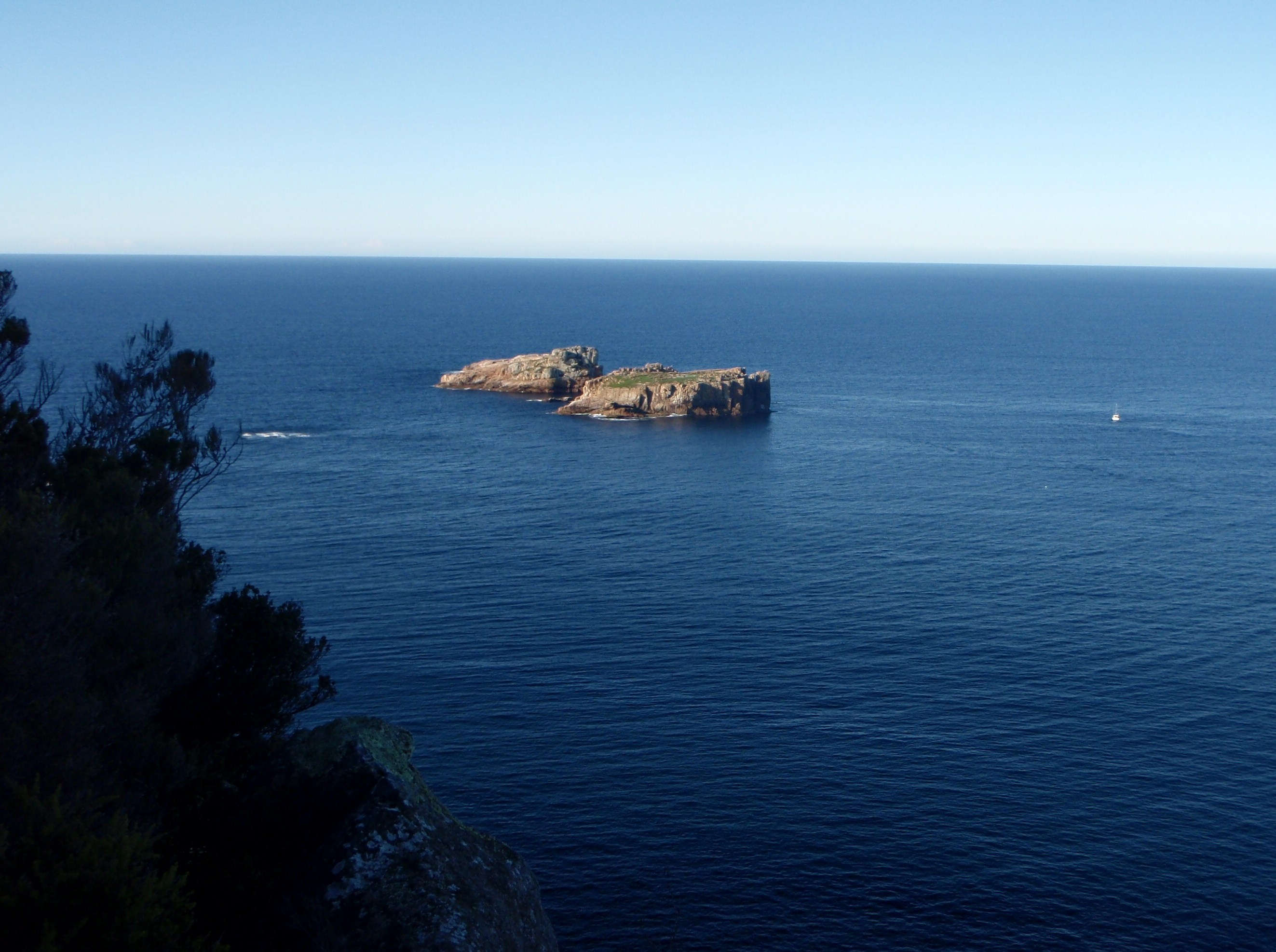
The Nuggets - four separate islands off Cape Tourville, Tasmania

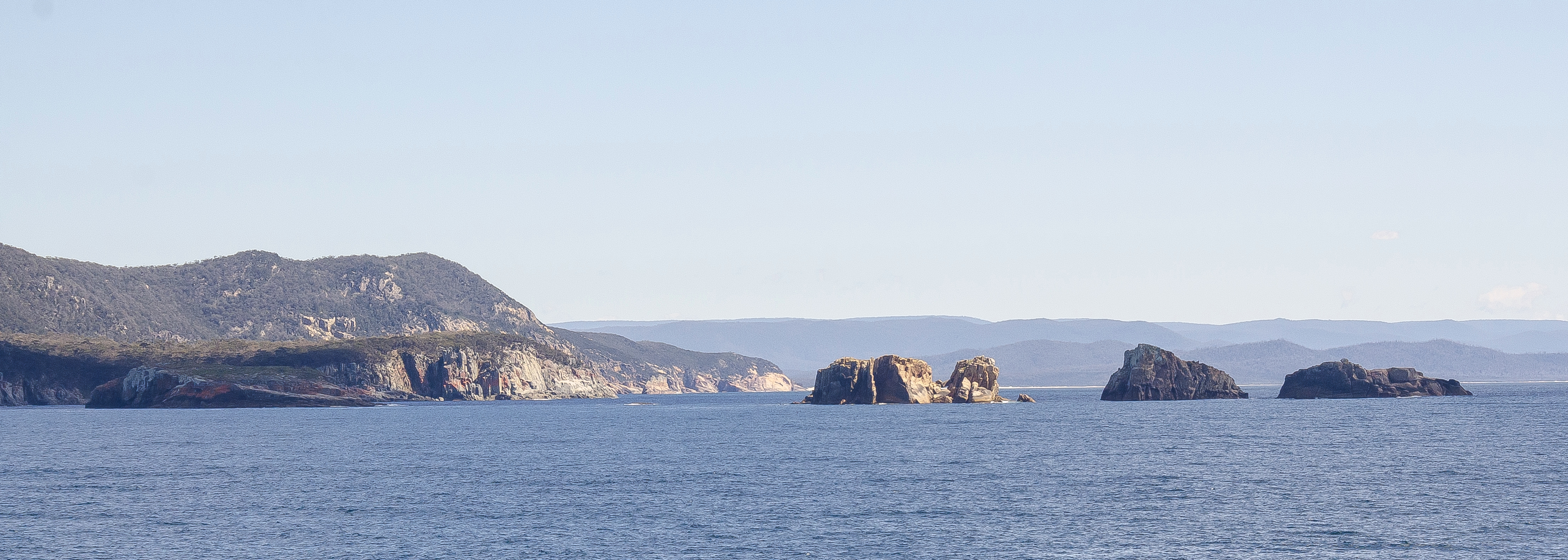
The four Nuggets, Tasmania

The Nuggets is a close group of four granite islets, with a combined area of 6.76 hectares (16.7 acres), in south-eastern Australia. They lie close to the eastern coast of Tasmania near the Freycinet Peninsula., and are near Cape Tourville, about 7 km north of Wineglass Bay and about 22 km north of Schouten Island.

The upper photograph, taken from Cape Tourville Lookout, appears to show two islets, but the left mass is actually two islets, making three in all. The lower photograph, taken from a ship about level with Cape Tourville Lighthouse, shows all four islets, with the largest of the group viewed against the mainland and therefore difficult to make out. Its closest edge looks something like a whale with seaweed draped on its head. The main plateau of the islet behind it is greenish in colour.

== Fauna ==
Recorded breeding seabird species are little penguin, short-tailed shearwater, fairy prion, common diving-petrel, white-faced storm-petrel, Pacific gull, silver gull, black-faced cormorant and Caspian tern.

Australian fur seals bask in the sun on convenient ledges.
