= Billion Dollar Buyer =

- Genre: Reality game show
- Created by: David Tibballs
- Starring: Tilman Fertitta
- Country of origin: United States
- Original language: English
- No. of seasons: 3
- No. of episodes: 24

Production
- Producers: David Tibballs; Robin Feinberg; Sarah Happel
- Production locations: Houston, Texas, United States
- Running time: 60 minutes
- Production company: Endemol Shine North America

Original release
- Network: CNBC
- Release: March 22, 2016 – February 28, 2018

Billion Dollar Buyer is an American reality TV show starring American business owner, Tilman Fertitta, CEO and owner of Landry's, Inc. Each hour-long episode features Fertitta traveling the nation to sample new and innovative hospitality products. Small business owners compete to impress the business mogul and land the "deal of a lifetime" - the opportunity to partner with Landry's, Inc., as a supplier to Fertitta's over 60 leading Landry's restaurants, hotels, and entertainment brands. The program premiered on March 22, 2016, and is broadcast on CNBC.

== Premise ==
The show follows Tilman Fertitta as he visits cities across the United States to assess potential products for his restaurants and casinos (anything from food and drink, to linens and spa goods) that are produced by small businesses. During each episode, Fertitta meets with two businesses to sample their wares and determine their compatibility with Landry's, Inc. Fertitta shares his assessment of the products and operations with the owners and recommends improvements to help the businesses meet Landry's standards of quality and finance. Contestants are then given time to implement Fertitta's advice. At the conclusion of the episode, Fertitta has the contestants join him at the Landry's, Inc., headquarters. There, Fertitta reveals his decision whether he will offer a contestant the "deal of a lifetime" by placing a substantial purchase order from their business.

A deal may be offered to one, both, or neither company.

== History and production ==
Billion Dollar Buyer was first advertised in January 2016 and the series premiered on March 22, 2016. The first season contains six episodes and while the series is filmed in cities across the United States, the episode always ends at Landry's, Inc. headquarters in Houston, TX.

CNBC has called the first episode its "most watched premiere hour ever." With the first season showing such success, Fertitta announced that filming for the second season is planned to begin in summer 2016 and feature almost twice as many episodes. The third installment of the series premiered on January 3, 2018 with new businesses making the pitch.
