= Golden Nuggets =

Breakfast cereal made by Cereal Partners

- Product type: Breakfast cereal
- Current owner: Nestlé
- Produced by: Nestlé
- Country: U.K. and Ireland
- Introduced: 1970s
- Website: nestle.com/golden-nuggets

Golden Nuggets are a breakfast cereal sold in the UK and Ireland by Nestlé. It is made mainly from cereal grains, sugar and honey, formed into large yellow crunchy balls. It has a sweet, slightly honey-like flavour. The taste has been described as similar to the American cereal Cap'n Crunch.

== History ==
Golden Nuggets were introduced in the 1970s in the United Kingdom and the United States, manufactured by Nabisco. They were then withdrawn from the UK market in the late 1970s.

However, they were brought back to the UK in 1999 with a £1 million advertising campaign, perhaps in response to demand from people who had enjoyed them in the 1970s and now had their own children.

== Marketing ==
The packaging features various cartoon characters (drawn by Gary Dunn): Klondike Pete (a gold prospector who mines Golden Nuggets), his mule Pardner, his enemies - two claim-jumpers named Plum Loco Louie and Boot Hill Bob (jointly "The Breakfast Bandits") - and a Golden Nuggets Bee. The Klondike Pete character was also used in the 1970s to market the US version of the cereal, Klondike Pete's Crunchy Nuggets. The box also sometimes features puzzles suited to the 7–12-year-old range. The cereal is marketed with the slogan "They taste Yeee-Haa!" (Previously "They're honey-crunchin' good!").

In 2019, the Labour Party listed the cereal among its targets as deputy leader Tom Watson decried the use of cartoon characters to entice children to highly sugared foods.

== Imitations ==
Similar cereals have been manufactured as home brands for supermarkets in Britain. Asda had 'Golden Balls'. Tesco had 'Multigrain Boulders'.
