= Golden Nugget (video game) =

1997 video game

- Cover art (Windows version)
- Developers: Abalone Entertainment and Software Development (Windows); Point of View, Inc. (PlayStation)
- Publisher: Virgin Interactive Entertainment
- Producers: Kevin Potter; Rob Pardo
- Designers: Kevin Potter; Erik Harshman
- Programmers: Christopher Warner; Mike Bowman
- Writer: Kelly Wand
- Composers: Keith Arem; Tommy Tallarico
- Platforms: Microsoft Windows; PlayStation
- Release: NA: 1996 (Win); NA: 1997 (PS1)
- Genre: Gambling simulation
- Mode: Single-player

Golden Nugget is a 1996 gambling simulation video game developed by Abalone Entertainment and Software Development, and published by Virgin Interactive Entertainment for Microsoft Windows. A PlayStation version, developed by Point of View, Inc., was also published by Virgin Interactive in 1997. Golden Nugget is set at the Golden Nugget hotel-casino in Las Vegas. It features 16 gambling games, and a story mode that includes a character portrayed by actor Adam West.

== Gameplay ==
Golden Nugget is set at the Golden Nugget hotel-casino in Las Vegas. It features 16 gambling games, including baccarat, blackjack, craps, poker, pai gow poker, roulette, and video poker. Poker games include seven-card stud and Texas hold 'em, and the game features six different types of slot machines (What Luck, Eureka, Royal Flush, Treasures of the Sea, Sweet Treats, and Double Diamond). The player begins with $10,000 to spend on the various gambling games, found throughout the Golden Nugget. For table games, the dealers and players are represented as arms through the use of full motion video (FMV). Sound effects include slot machines, people murmuring, and bets being called out by dealers. The player also has 9 markers with which they can cash in for another $1,000 should they run out of money; however, if the player runs out of money and also runs out of markers, the game is over. The casino also has high limit game and slot rooms; however, a player must have won at least $50,000 to access these, at which point a player gets a VIP Club card.

Golden Nugget features a mystery-themed story mode in which the player takes the role of poker player Steven Killsbourg, whose ex-girlfriend, scientist Dr. Shelly Harkness, has used chaos theory to create the Chaos Chip, a microchip capable of advanced problem-solving. When the chip is stolen, Killsbourg must play through three poker tournaments to find the culprit, with help from Hugh Swain (portrayed by Adam West). The story line gradually plays out through FMV clips that are shown as the game progresses. Each subsequent tournament has a higher entry fee than the previous. After completing a tournament, the player must play other gambling games to raise money for the next tournament. As the player progresses through the tournaments, FMV clips of Swain and other characters are shown to help the player eventually identify the culprit at the end of the story.

== Development and release ==
West filmed more than 45 minutes of footage at the real Golden Nugget hotel-casino for the game. The Microsoft Windows version was developed by Abalone Entertainment and Software Development, and was published by Virgin Interactive in 1996. The PlayStation version, developed by Point of View, Inc., was published by Virgin Interactive in late 1997. The PlayStation version was released on two separate discs, with one containing the game's story mode. The game included a discount certificate for buyers to spend a night at the Golden Nugget hotel.

== Reception ==
Reception

Review scores
| Publication | Score | |
| Publication | PC | PS |
|---|---|---|
| Computer Games Strategy Plus | 3/5 | |
| Computer Gaming World | 2/5 | |
| Electronic Gaming Monthly | | 5.625/10 |
| GameRevolution | | C |
| GameSpot | 7/10 | |
| IGN | | 6/10 |
| Knight Ridder Newspapers | | C+ |
| Syracuse Herald American | | 4/5 |

Golden Nugget was praised for its variety of games, as well as its realism. Staten Island Advance considered the game an improvement from other gambling simulations, praising its variety and its replication of the "sights and sounds" of a real casino, while the Sun-Sentinel stated that the game had the "looks and sounds" of the real Golden Nugget. Tim Soete of GameSpot called the game a "notable accomplishment because of the hyper-realistic atmosphere it creates," but stated that the game's realism detracted from "the simplicity of the individual games". Some reviewers also praised the graphics. Some criticized the sluggish pace of the card games, and the lack of in-game instructions. West's phrases in the game were also criticized by some.

IGN stated that despite the "semi-bland graphics," Golden Nugget "actually makes you feel like you're in a real casino". IGN considered the storyline slightly generic, but stated that it added "a little spice" to the bland gambling. Charles Ardai of Computer Gaming World considered the gambling games average, and stated that placing a bet was both "graphically rich" and "needlessly complicated". Ardai also criticized the game's "dopey" plot and the "paralyzingly awful" FMV story clips. Sushi-X of Electronic Gaming Monthly found that the elaborate animations make the games frustratingly slow and therefore less fun. Fort Worth Star-Telegram stated that Golden Nugget would appeal more to veteran gamblers, calling the individual gambling games "complicated and confusing as well as challenging."

Aaron Curtiss of the Los Angeles Times also considered the game complicated, and called its mystery aspect "goofy". GamePro called the gambling "authentic but inherently boring", and concluded "the mystery mode is a good idea, and West's cheesy performance alone makes the game worth renting." Cindy Yates of Computer Games Strategy Plus praised the sounds and stated that gamblers would enjoy the game. She criticized the story mode, but stated that West "gives a reasonable performance as Swain – even with the worst script imaginable." Brett Atwood of Billboard called West a "playful, perfect guide." Electronic Gaming Monthly's reviewers were divided about the story mode. Shawn Smith said it was interesting and that Adam West was the best aspect of the game, but Crispin Boyer and Dan Hsu called it silly and dull, while Sushi-X felt it detracted from the experience because the plot essentially has nothing to do with gambling, and derided West's performance as "incessant whining". Boyer and Hsu also complained that the game does not identify the winners of poker hands, though in a later issue EGM printed a retraction which acknowledged that pushing select displays the winner. Jason Zimring of Game Revolution praised the inclusion of West, but criticized the lack of multiplayer and poor control, and stated that the various games quickly become boring.

== See also ==
- Caesars Palace 2000
- Hard Rock Casino (video game)
