= Golden Nugget Las Vegas =

Hotel casino in Las Vegas, United States

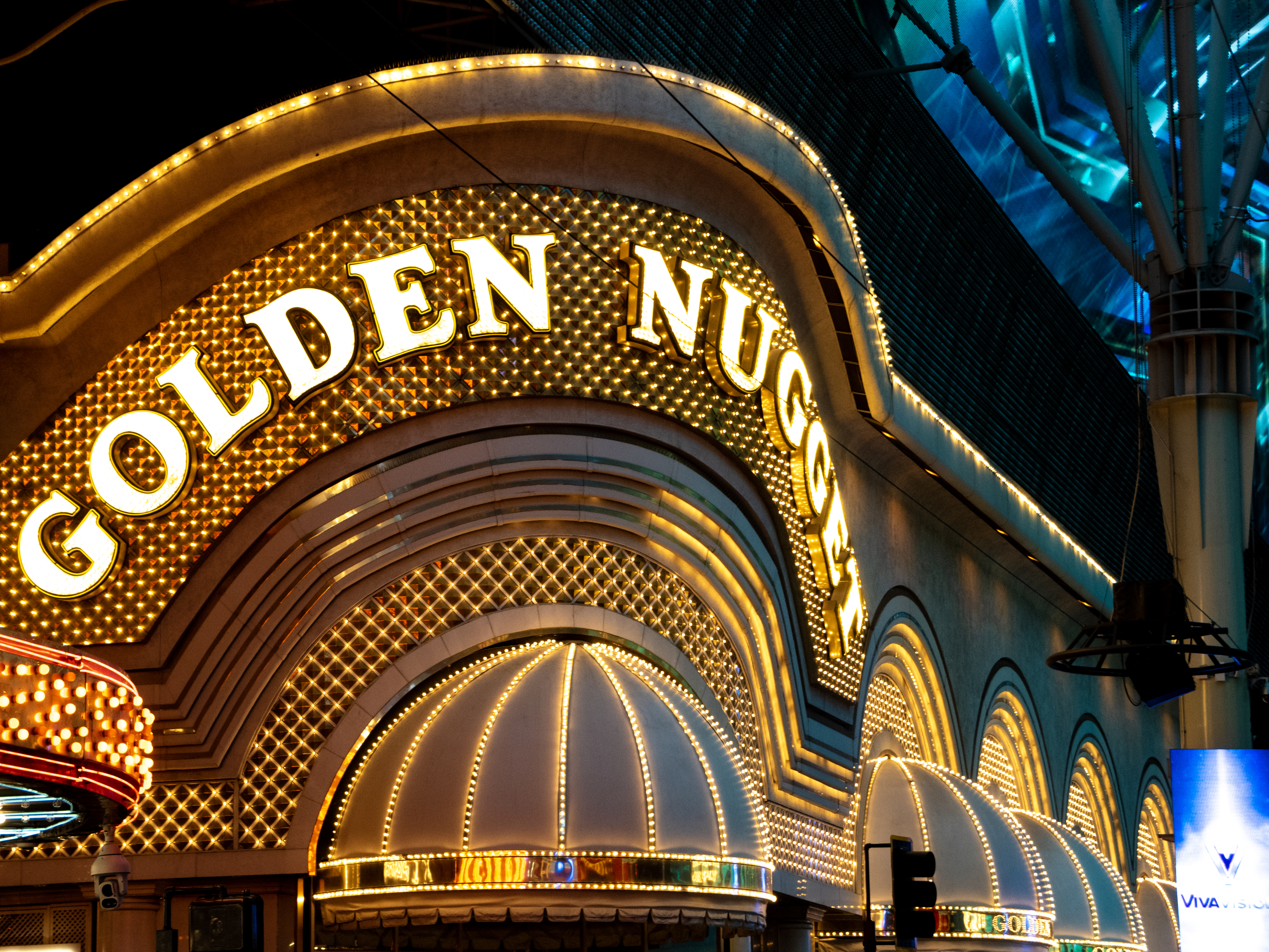

- Location within Downtown Las Vegas Location within Nevada
- Interactive map of Golden Nugget Las Vegas
- Location: Las Vegas, Nevada 89101, United States; 129 Fremont Street; 36°10′15″N 115°08′41″W
- Opened: August 30, 1946; 80 years ago
- Theme: Gold rush
- No. of rooms: 2,419
- Gaming space: 38,000 sq ft (3,500 m^{2})
- Permanent shows: Clint Holmes & Frankie Moreno (through August, 2017)
- Signature attractions: Gold Nuggets; Shark Tank
- Notable restaurants: Vic & Anthony's; Red Sushi; Chart House
- Casino type: Land
- Owner: Landry's
- Renovated in: 1977, 1984, 1986, 2006–2007, 2009, 2014, 2018, 2021
- Website: www.goldennugget.com

The Golden Nugget Las Vegas is a luxury hotel and casino located in downtown Las Vegas, Nevada, United States, on the Fremont Street Experience. The property is owned and operated by Landry's, Inc. It has 2,419 hotel rooms.

== History ==
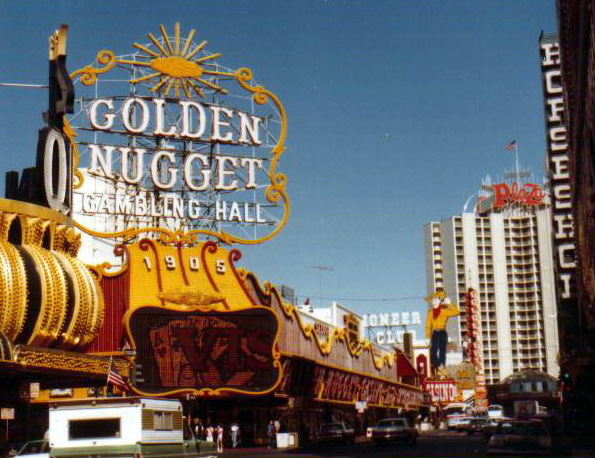
The Golden Nugget in 1983

The Golden Nugget was originally built in 1946, making it one of the oldest casinos in Las Vegas. Jackie Gaughan at one time owned a stake in the hotel as part of his many downtown properties. Steve Wynn bought a stake in the Nugget, which he increased so that, in 1973, he became the majority shareholder, and the youngest casino owner in Las Vegas and purchased the neighboring California Club in 1973 and combined the two properties under the former’s banner. In 1977, he opened the first hotel tower and the resort earned its first four-diamond rating from Mobil Travel Guide. It was the foundation for Wynn's rise to prominence in the casino industry. Frank Sinatra periodically headlined at the Golden Nugget.

The second hotel tower opened in 1984 along with the showroom, and the third tower was opened in 1986. In 1987, the hotel was host to Bruce Willis and Demi Moore's wedding.

In 2000, the Golden Nugget (and all of Mirage Resorts' other properties) was sold to MGM Grand, Inc. (later named MGM Mirage).

Although the Golden Nugget was profitable, it was not part of the master expansion plan of the corporation which was focused on consolidating a long stretch of the Strip by acquiring Mandalay Resort Group, building City Center, and beginning construction in Macau. Gaming revenue on Fremont Street had peaked in fiscal year 1993. The Golden Nugget was sold in 2003, for $215 million to Poster Financial Group, owned by Timothy Poster and Thomas Breitling. When Poster Financial assumed control of the Golden Nugget, they began to upgrade the gambling operation by installing new cashless slot machines and by increasing the maximum bet available at table games to $15,000. Their story became the basis for The Casino, a television series on Fox that premiered on June 14, 2004.

On February 4, 2005, Houston, Texas–based Landry's, Inc announced its intent to purchase the property and the Golden Nugget Laughlin. The sale closed on September 27, 2005. After the purchase, the Golden Nugget embarked on a 14-month, $100 million renovation project, which was completed in November 2006. In December 2007, the Golden Nugget completed its $70 million Phase II project, which expanded the resort west onto First Street and introduced additional entertainment, event and dining venues. Phase III was the opening of the 500-room, $150 million Rush hotel Tower on November 20, 2009, along with the Chart House restaurant.

=== Media history ===
==== Onscreen ====
Films

- In the opening credits of the Elvis Presley film, Viva Las Vegas
- In the James Bond film Diamonds Are Forever (1971), the casino can be continually seen in the police chase scene.
- Briefly in the Chevy Chase comedy film, Vegas Vacation
- The casino can be seen in the beginning of the film Smokin' Aces (2006), in which the antagonist cuts the ribbons for the casino's grand opening.
- In the film Next (2007), Nicolas Cage is briefly seen entering the Golden Nugget through the Fremont Street entrance.
- The Golden Nugget features prominently in the poker mockumentary The Grand (2008).
- In the music video for "Night Fever" by the Bee Gees

Television

- The 1959 Alfred Hitchcock Presents episode "Man from the South", the opening shot shows the Casino and Fremont St.
- The Golden Nugget and Fremont Street are in the opening scene of "The Night Stalker" (1972) with reporter Carl Kolchak investigating a series of vampire murders in Las Vegas.
- Vega$ (1978-1981) showed exterior shots of the Golden Nugget in the opening and closing slots and in the pilot episode
- In the episode Honky Tonk Woman of the anime series Cowboy Bebop, the logo of the Golden Nugget can be briefly seen as they escape from the casino, insinuating it will still exist in the distant future.
- The casino appears in the background of many scenes in the 1994 ABC Miniseries The Stand.
- The Golden Nugget appears in the background of a 1998 King of the Hill episode Next of Shin as Hank, Dale, and Bill search for Hank's father Cotton in Las Vegas.
- The Casino (2004), a Fox reality television series, is based on the story of the Golden Nugget's acquisition by Poster Financial Group.
- In 2010, the casino's pool and shark aquarium were featured throughout an episode of CSI: Crime Scene Investigation.
- The casino was a recurring property in Billion Dollar Buyer on CNBC.
- In one of the most memorable scenes of Vanderpump Rules, Tom Sandoval admits to Stassi Schroeder that "yes, [he] and Ariana made out in a swimming pool at The Golden Nugget." Schroeder comments that the infidelity occurring that the Golden Nugget in particular is an "all-time low," to which Sandoval replies that he "frickin' loves that place."

==== In games ====
- In all Street Fighter II games (except HD Remix), Balrog's (M. Bison in Japanese) stage is set in front of the Golden Nugget, with the sign clearly seen in the back. In HD Remix, it has been changed to the "Crazy Buffalo", presumably in reference to the name of Balrog's original Super Combo. The updated version of the scenario that appears in Street Fighter V changes the name of the casino to the "Golden Bullion", most likely to avoid legal issues.
- The name Golden Nugget also designates several casino games: Golden Nugget (1997), Golden Nugget 64 (1998), Golden Nugget Casino (2004; Game Boy Advance), and Golden Nugget Casino DS (2006).
- In Fallout: New Vegas, the logo of the "Silver Rush", formerly a gambling hall, shows a similarity to the logo of the Golden Nugget.
- The Golden Nugget appears as a Safehouse for players in Grand Theft Auto: San Andreas. The safehouse appears as a hotel room.

== Attractions ==
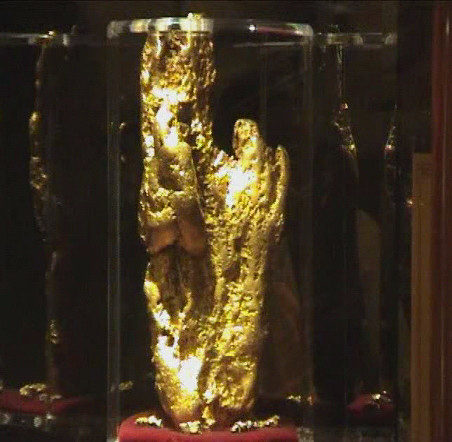
The Hand of Faith

The world's largest gold nugget on display, the Hand of Faith, is still shown today in the Golden Nugget lobby. Weighing 875 troy ounces (960 oz; 60.0 lb; 27,200 g) and 18 inches (46 cm) in length, the Hand of Faith was found near Kingower, Victoria, Australia, and put on display at the casino in 1981 amid a number of other gold nuggets.

The casino's large hotel sign at its entrance off Fremont and Casino Center was removed in 1984 when the casino underwent renovations. The old sign presently sits at the YESCO signage yard.

The expanded resort is built around two aquariums. The larger faces the swimming pool and incorporates a slide through the tank containing full-grown sharks. The smaller aquarium is in the lobby of the Rush Tower.

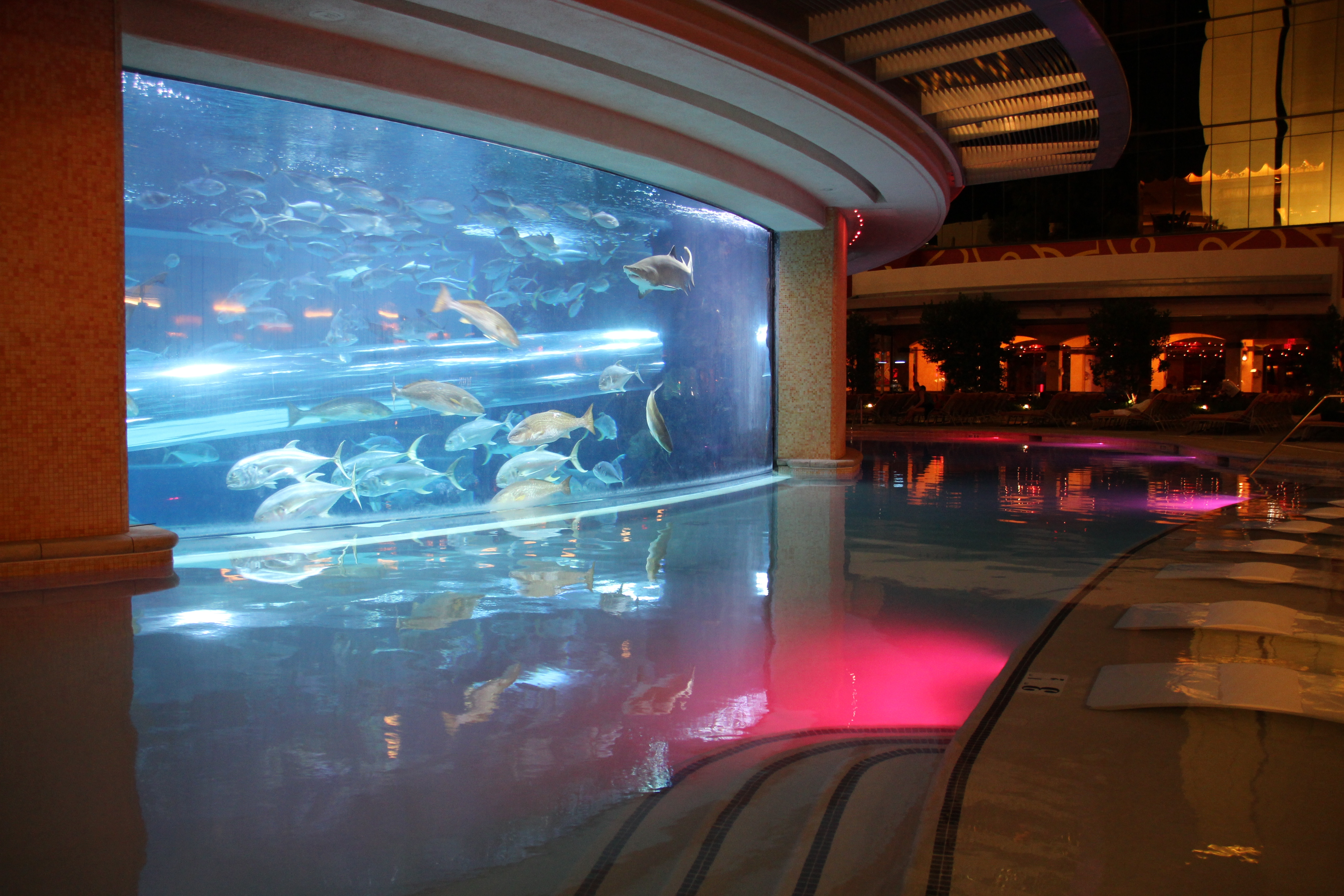
Golden Nugget Casino—Slide through the shark tank

A total of five specialty restaurants were added: Vic & Anthony's Steakhouse, Grotto Ristorante, Lillie's Asian Cuisine, Red Sushi and Chart House. The Chart House has a view of one of the aquariums. The pool is a $30 million unique three-level adventure with an enclosed slide through a shark tank, hidden grottos, swim-up bars, jacuzzis and multi-depth areas.

== Golden Nugget and Poster Financial group ==
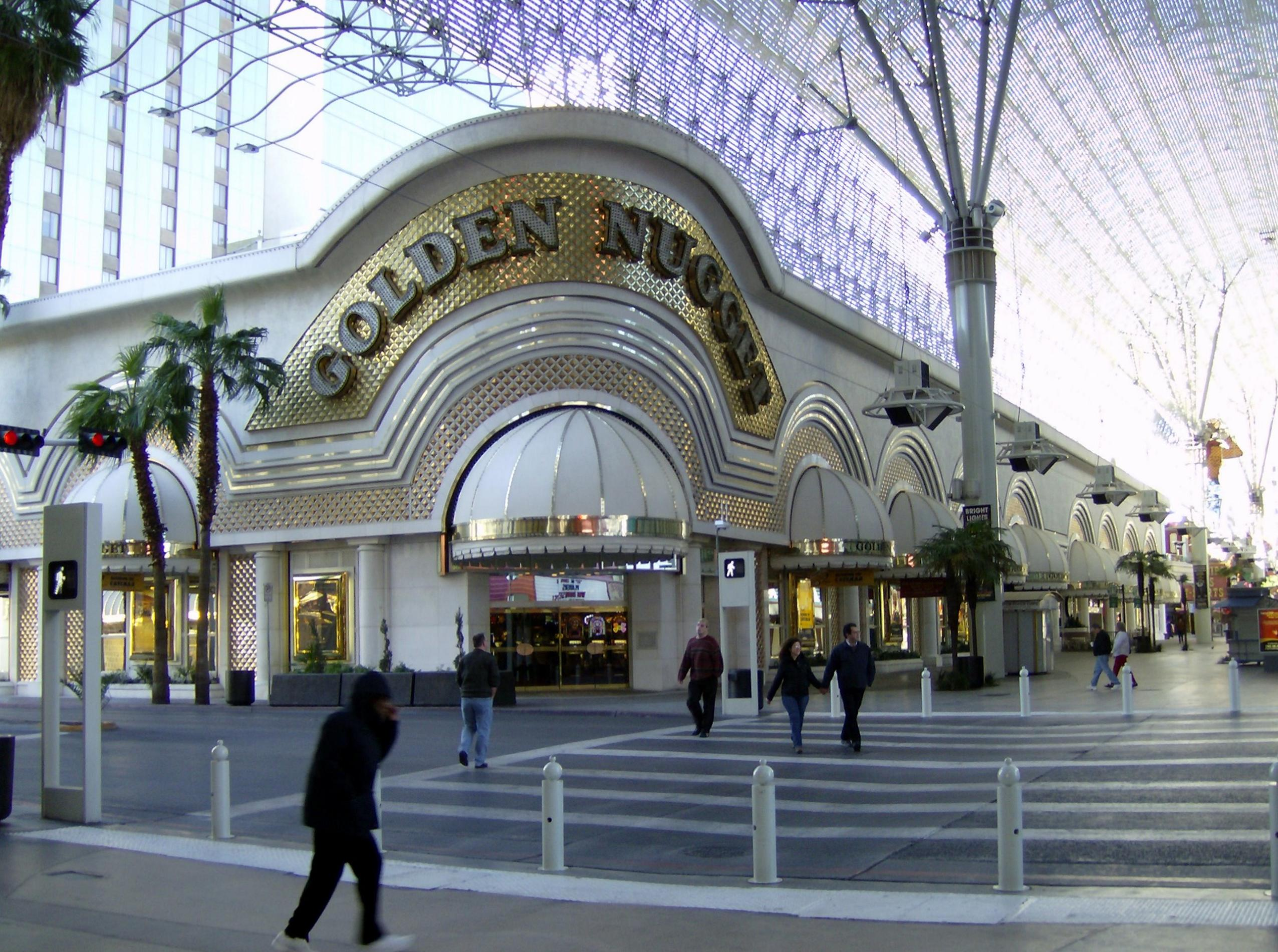
Golden Nugget during the day in 2007

Tom Breitling and Tim Poster were the highest profile successful entrepreneurs who profited in the downtown market during the last crisis. As recounted in Tom Breitling's book, Double or Nothing, the partners agreed to buy the Golden Nugget and had an agreement to sell the property after operating it for only one year. The partners made $113 million in profit, called the highest rate of return in such a short time in the gaming industry. However, the partners had a negative income for the year and the fortune was made while total revenue for downtown was still basically flat.

Timeline of Poster & Breitling (Poster Financial Group) ownership of Golden Nugget
Date	Description
Year 2000	Tom Breitling and Tim Poster sell their web-based business for over $100 million
Early 2003	Tom Breitling and Tim Poster begin shopping for a quality affordable casino for their vision of Vintage Vegas
Jun 2003	MGM-Mirage announced an agreement to sell the Golden Nugget (Las Vegas & Laughlin) to Poster Financial Group for $215 million
Jan 2004	Binion's Horseshoe across the street from Golden Nugget closed because of IRS liens
Jan 2004	Poster & Breitling take possession of the Golden Nugget. Introduce policy high-limit policy on table games
Jun 2004	Fox reality show The Casino, which focuses on Tim and Tom, is broadcast from June 2004 to August 2004. The show was canceled after its first season due to low ratings.
Jun 2004	Tim and Tom are two of the 50 Hottest Bachelors in People Magazine
Sep 2004	High-limit policy backfires, as a lucky gambler known as Mr. Royalty wins $8.5 million on a 2-week hot streak
Dec 2004	Annual report filed with SEC shows net loss of $9.196m for Poster Financial Group for the year 2004
Dec 2004	Landry's, Inc. successfully executed a refinancing of $850 million
Feb 2005	Agreement of sale entered with Landry's, Inc. for Golden Nugget
Sep 2005	Landry's, Inc. takes possession of the Golden Nugget.

== See also ==
- Golden Nugget Atlantic City
- Golden Nugget Lake Charles
- Golden Nugget Laughlin
