= List of companies in Houston =

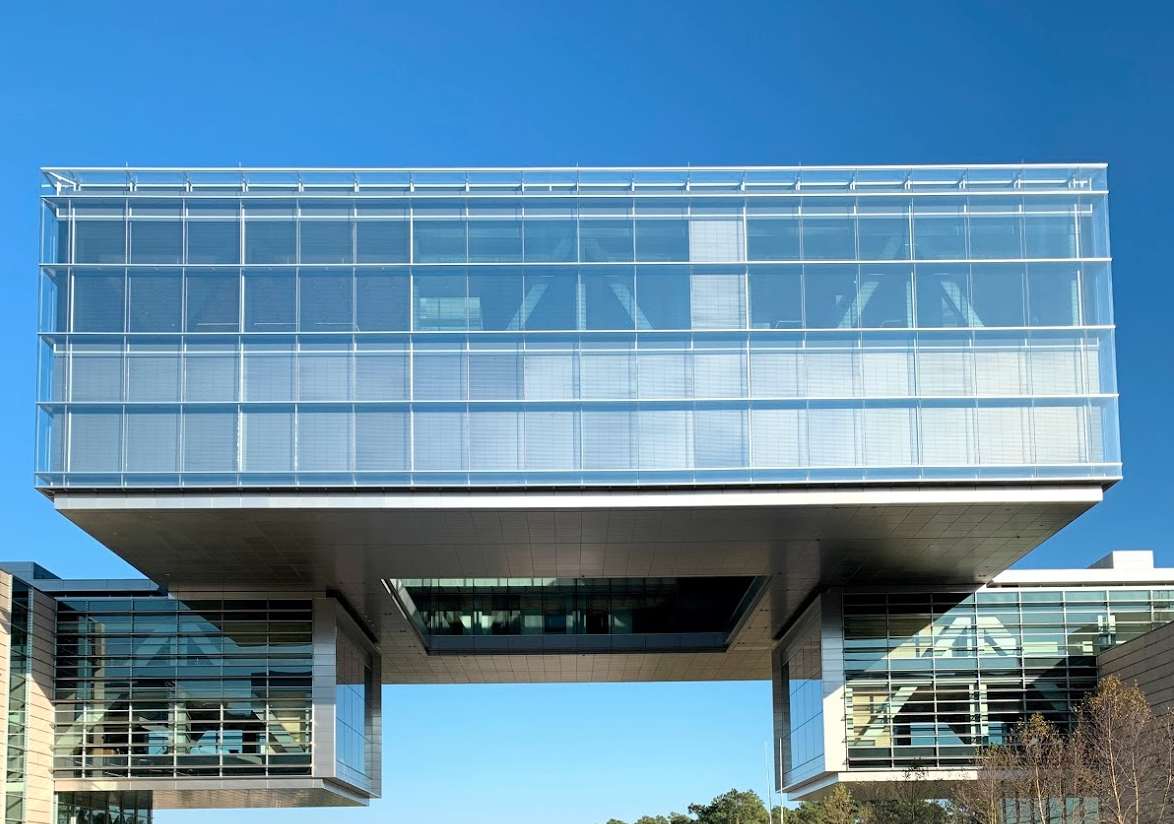
Floating cube at ExxonMobil headquarters

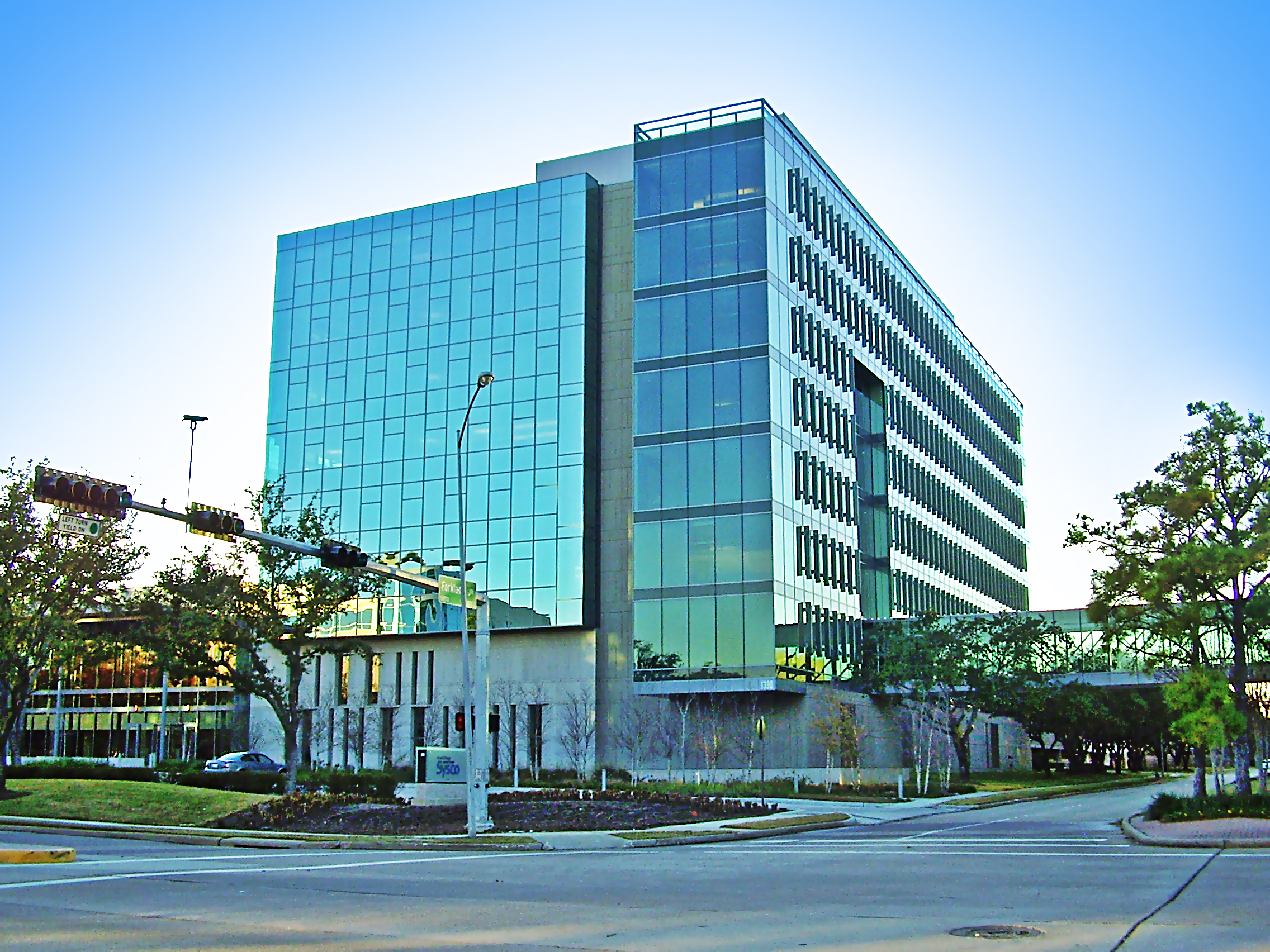
Sysco headquarters

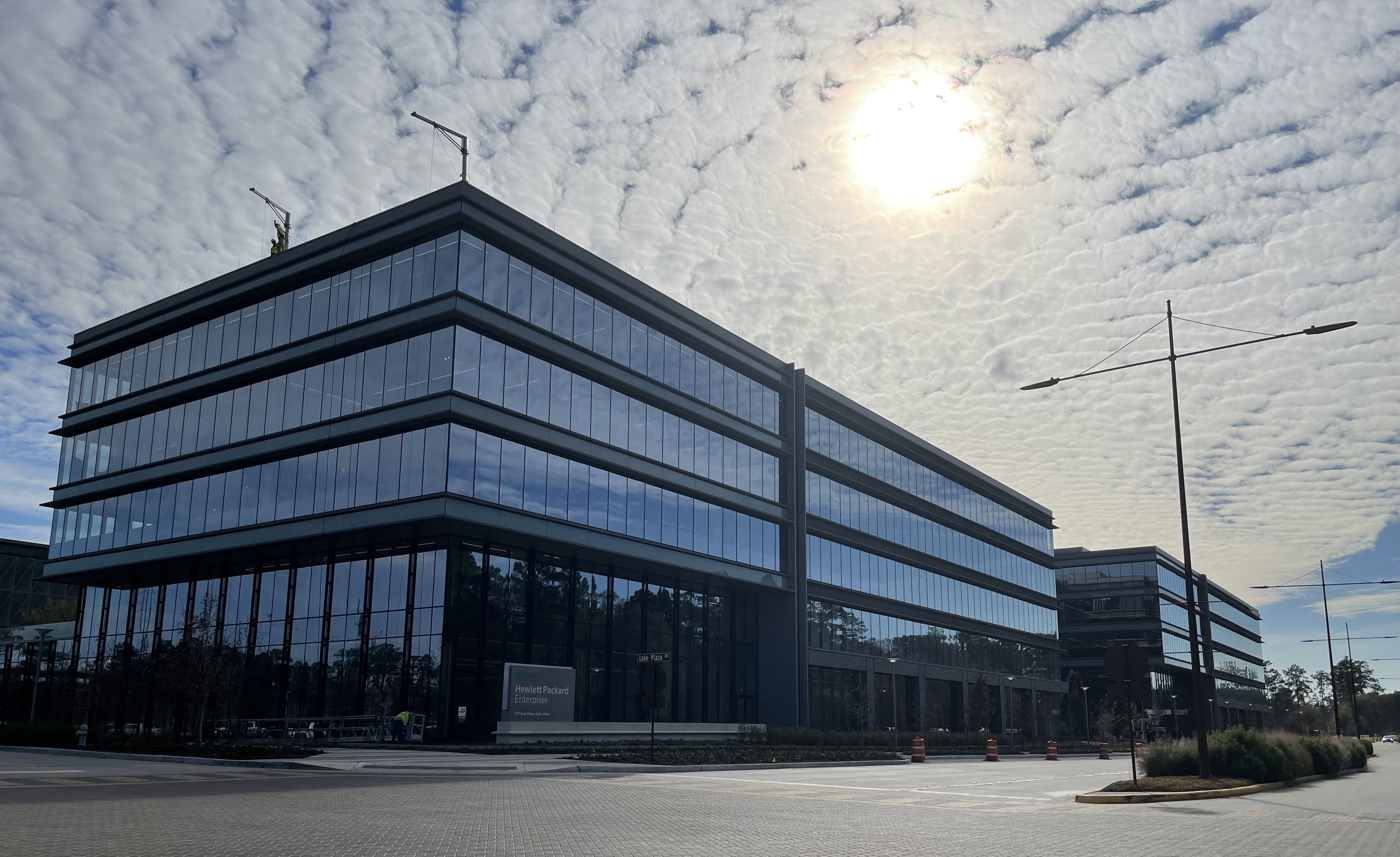
Hewlett Packard Enterprise headquarters

Post Oak Tower in Uptown Houston, the headquarters for Landry's and Fertitta Entertainment

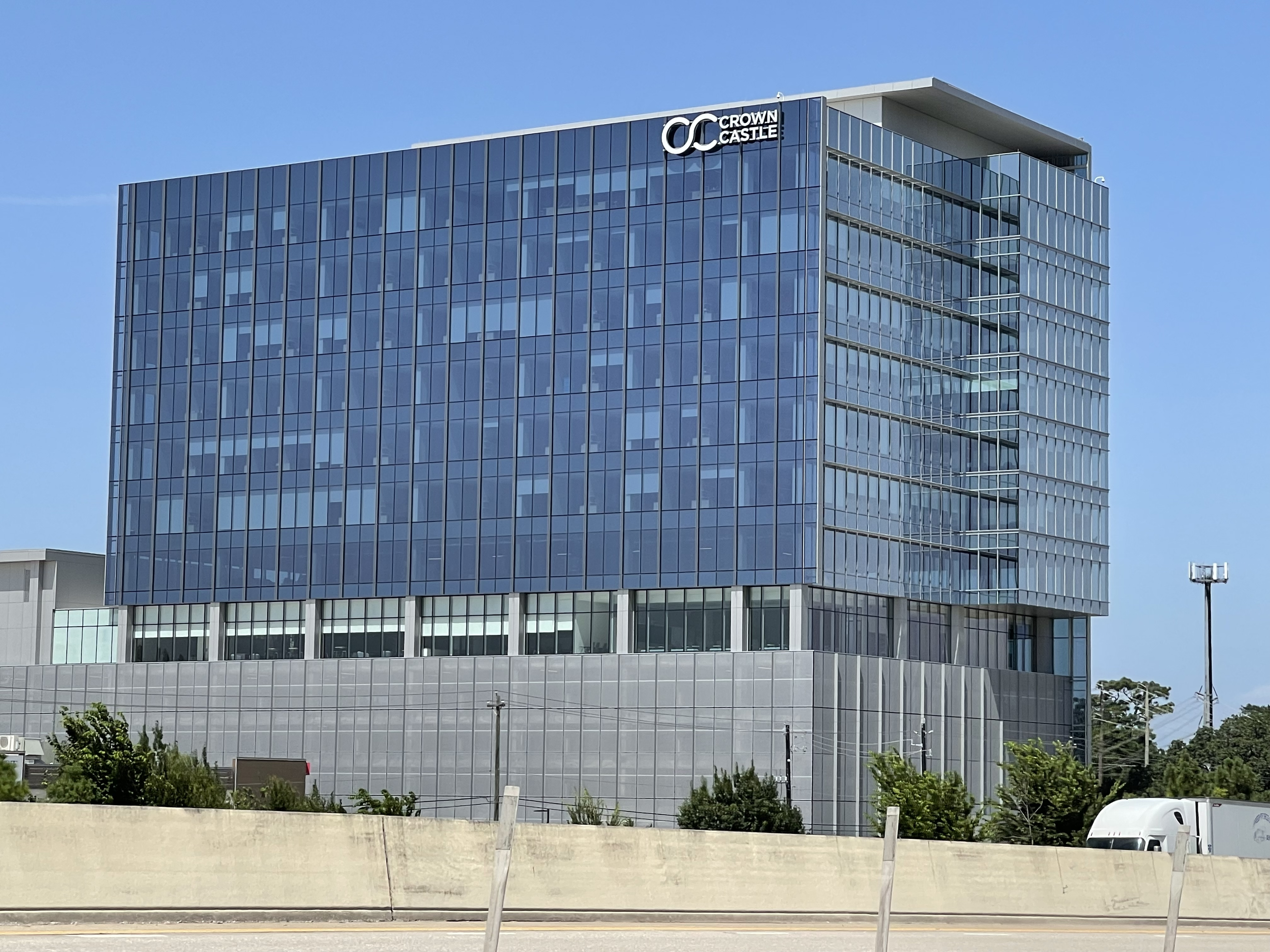
Crown Castle headquarters

KBR Tower, KBR's headquarters

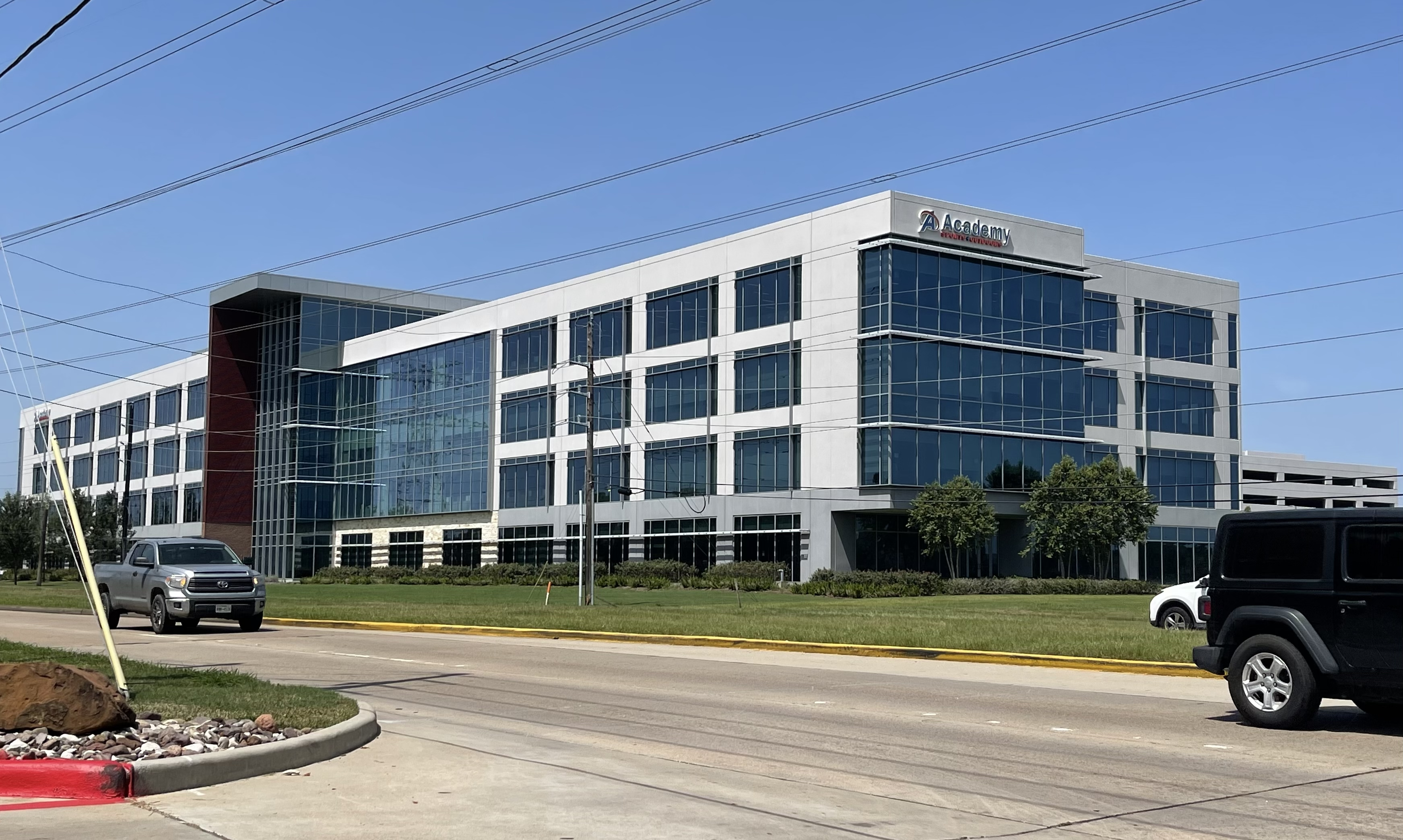
Academy Sports + Outdoors headquarters in Katy, Texas

This is a list of major companies or subsidiaries headquartered in Houston, Texas and Greater Houston.

== Fortune 500 companies based in Greater Houston ==
Fortune 500 companies based in Houston
| Rank | Company name |
| 7 | ExxonMobil |
| 15 | Chevron |
| 26 | Phillips 66 |
| 54 | Sysco |
| 90 | Enterprise Products Partners |
| 92 | Plains GP Holdings |
| 106 | Hewlett Packard Enterprise |
| 149 | Occidental Petroleum |
| 156 | ConocoPhillips |
| 161 | Baker Hughes |
| 177 | Halliburton |
| 199 | Waste Management |
| 200 | Cheniere Energy |
| 268 | Kinder Morgan |
| 278 | Quanta Services |
| 285 | EOG Resources |
| 286 | Group 1 Automotive |
| 333 | NRG Energy |
| 342 | CenterPoint Energy |
| 364 | Targa Resources |
| 388 | Westlake Chemical |
| 457 | NOV Inc. |
| 460 | Huntsman Corporation |
| 467 | Crown Castle |
| 470 | KBR |
| 475 | Academy Sports + Outdoors |
Companies in the petroleum industry

== Other notable companies based in Houston ==
In addition to the Fortune 500 companies above, many other companies in multiple fields are headquartered or have based their US headquarters in Houston.

- Al's Formal Wear
- Allis-Chalmers Energy
- Allpoint
- American Bureau of Shipping
- American National Insurance Company (Galveston)
- Aon Hewitt
- Archimage
- Avelo Airlines
- Axiom Space
- Baker Botts
- Bill.com
- BMC Software
- Boardwalk Pipeline Partners
- Bracewell LLP
- Bristow Group
- Buc-Ee's (Pearland, Texas)
- Cadence Bank
- Cal Dive International
- CAMAC Energy
- Camden Property Trust
- Cardtronics
- Charming Charlie
- Chord Energy
- Citgo
- Civeo Corporation
- Comfort Systems USA
- Cooper Industries
- cPanel
- Cybersoft
- Diamond Offshore Drilling
- Direct Energy
- DHI Telecom Group
- Dynegy
- EagleRock Land
- Enbridge
- EnergyFunders
- Family Tree DNA
- Fertitta Entertainment
- Fiesta Mart
- FlightAware
- Forum Energy Technologies
- Freeport-McMoRan Oil & Gas
- Fuddruckers
- Fulbright & Jaworski (now Norton Rose Fulbright US LLP)
- Geokinetics
- Gexa Energy
- Great Lakes Dredge & Dock Co
- Gulf South Pipeline
- Gulf States Toyota Distributors
- HCC Insurance Holdings
- Helix Energy Solutions Group
- Hines Interests Limited Partnership
- Honeywell
- HostGator
- Howard Hughes Corporation
- Insperity
- Integrated Electrical Services
- ION Geophysical
- James Coney Island
- Jiffy Lube
- Jim Adler
- Joe's Crab Shack
- KBR, Inc.
- Kelsey-Seybold Clinic
- Key Energy Services
- Kinder Morgan Energy Partners
- Kirby Corporation
- Landry's Restaurants
- LivaNova
- Luby's
- Lukoil U.S.
- LyondellBasell US headquarters
- Mac Haik#Mac Haik Enterprises Mac Haik Enterprises
- Marathon Oil
- Marble Slab Creamery
- Mattress Firm
- McDermott International
- Memorial Hermann Healthcare System
- The Methodist Hospital
- MetroCorp Bancshares
- Mexican Restaurants, Inc.
- Microvast
- Motiva Enterprises
- Murphy Oil
- Nabors Industries
- Nalco Champion
- National Tire and Battery
- Nutex Health
- Oceaneering International
- Omega Protein
- OpenStax
- Pappas Restaurants
- Par Pacific Holdings
- Patterson-UTI
- Piping Technology and Products
- Powell Industries
- PROS
- Randall's Food Markets
- Rainforest Cafe
- RedTube
- Rice Epicurean Markets
- St. Luke's Episcopal Hospital
- Saltgrass Steakhouse
- Salata Salad Kitchen
- Seaboard International
- Service Corporation International
- Shipley Do-Nuts
- SnapStream
- Southwestern National Bank
- Spec's Wine, Spirits & Finer Foods
- Stage Stores Inc.
- Stewart & Stevenson
- Stewart Information Services Corporation
- Tailored Brands
- Talos Energy
- Tellurian
- Texas Children's Hospital
- Transwestern
- Travel Wifi
- Two Pesos
- Valaris Limited
- Valencia Group
- Vinson & Elkins
- Weatherford International
- Weed Eater
- WidgetCo, Inc.
- Willbros Group
- Woodforest National Bank
- 3DI - Data Driven Development Initiative

== Foreign companies with American headquarters in Houston ==
- Air Liquide
- Banorte
- BHP
- BP
- CEMEX
- Daikin
- EDP Renewables
- Engie
- Equinor
- Fugro
- JX Nippon Oil & Energy
- Mahindra Group
- Mitsubishi Heavy Industries
- PDVSA
- Petrobras
- Rigaku
- Sabic
- Sasol
- Schlumberger
- Shell plc
- SK Innovation
- TC Energy
- TechnipFMC
- Tokio Marine
- TotalEnergies
- Transocean
- Wood Group
- Worley
- Yokogawa Electric

== Companies with a large presence in Houston ==
- AIG
- Amazon
- Aon
- Collins Aerospace
- Deloitte
- ExxonMobil
- Honeywell
- HP Inc.
- Jacobs Engineering Group
- JPMorgan Chase
- Minute Maid
- Stellantis
- United Airlines Holdings
- Wells Fargo
