= Gaylor =

Gaylor may refer to:

== People ==
=== Surname ===
- Alan B. Gaylor, American businessman
- Amber Gaylor, English footballer
- Anne Nicol Gaylor, American atheist feminist and founder of the Freedom From Religion Foundation
- Annie Laurie Gaylor, American editor, author, and co-president of the Freedom From Religion Foundation
- Brett Gaylor, Canadian filmmaker
- Chris Gaylor, drummer for The All-American Rejects
- Robert Gaylor, United States Air Force Chief Master Sergeant
- Ruth Gaylor (1918–1972), American big band vocalist
- Trevor Gaylor, American football player
- Wood Gaylor, American artist

=== Given name ===
- Gaylor Curier, French basketball player
- Gaylor Kasle, American bridge player
- Leirion Gaylor Baird, American politician

== Places ==
- Gaylor, Missouri
- Gaylor Peak, a summit in Yosemite National Park

== Other ==
- Gaylor conspiracy theory, a fringe theory that asserts that Taylor Swift is secretly gay

== See also ==
- Gayler
- Gaylord
