= Tep =

Tep may refer to:

== Languages ==
- Tep language, spoken in Nigeria
- Tepecano language, once spoken in Mexico (ISO 639: tep)

== People from Cambodia with the surname ==
- Tep Rindaro (born 1963), actor and karaoke singer
- Tep Vanny (born 1980), land activist
- Tep Vong (born 1932), Buddhist monk
- Tep Boprek (born 1993), pop singer
- Tep Sothy (born 1973), politician in Takéo
- Tep Ngorn (fl. 2003), politician in Kandal

== Other uses ==
- Tep Pranam, a Hindu temple in Angkor Thom, Cambodia
- Tep Sodachan, a 1968 Khmer-language film
- Tep Wireless, British telecommunications multinational
- Tep Songva, another Khmer film

== See also ==
- TEP (disambiguation)
