= GreenStreet =

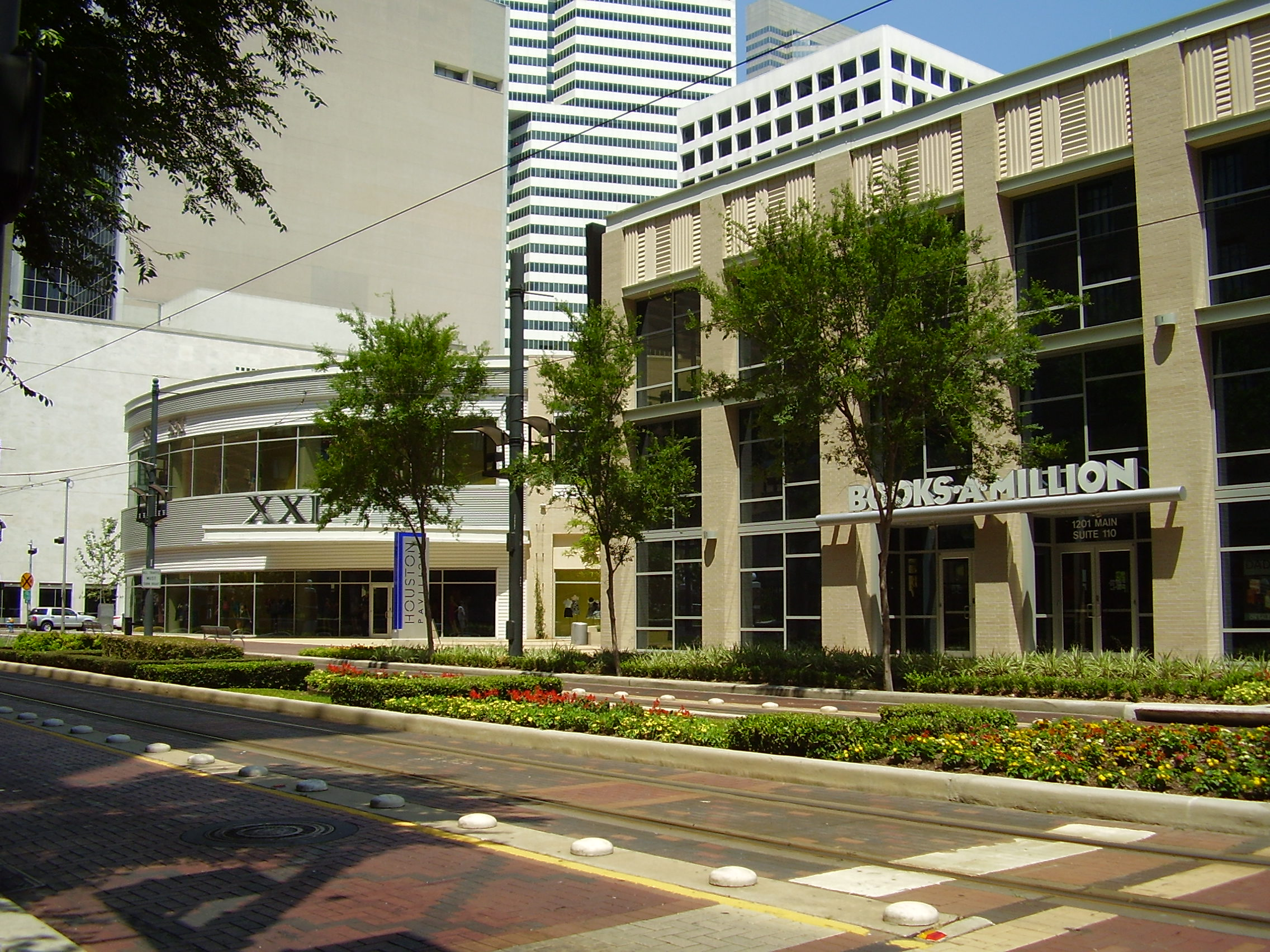
- GreenStreet in 2005
- Location: Downtown, Houston, Texas, U.S.
- Coordinates: 29.7543°N 95.3652°W
- Address: 1201 Fannin Street
- Opened: 2008; 18 years ago
- Developer: Texas Real Estate Trust, Inc. & Entertainment Development Group
- Manager: Unknown
- Owner: Unknown, North Houston Bank
- Architect: Laguarda.Low Architects
- Num. of stores: Unknown
- Num. of anchor tenants: 3
- Floor area: 350,000 sq ft (33,000 m^{2})
- Floors: 12
- Public transit: METRO Routes 6, 11, 51, 52, 137, METRORail Red Line
- Website: www.greenstreetdowntown.com

GreenStreet, formerly known as Houston Pavilions, is a commercial development in Downtown Houston, Texas, United States.

The Houston Chronicle reported that the Pavilions will provide around 1,800 to 2,000 full- and part-time jobs.

The Houston Pavilions office tower, which is 11 stories tall, is named the NRG Tower, after its main tenant.

== History ==
=== Planning ===
Construction was scheduled to begin in Spring 2006, with the first developments opening in the fourth quarter of 2007. The project possesses an estimated cost of $200 million and is expected to contain almost 560,000 square feet (50,000 m^{2}) of space, including 360,000 square feet (33,000 m^{2}) of retail space in the first two levels of the development. The project covers three 1.4-acre (5,700 m^{2}) city blocks. As of November 16, 2006, 50% of the retail space had been leased. 200,000 square feet (19,000 m^{2}) of loft office space will be available on the mid-block between Fannin and San Jacinto Streets. Office parking will be provided in the Houston Pavilions' 1,675 garage located on the corner of Main and Polk.

The project was developed by Texas Real Estate Trust, Inc. and Entertainment Development Group, who also developed the Denver Pavilions in Denver, Colorado. Geoffrey Jones and William Denton served as the co-developers of the project. The designers were Laguarda.Low Architects from Dallas.

To finance the development, developers obtained a construction loan from North Houston Bank, an $8.8 million development grant for infrastructure improvements from the city of Houston, and $5.5 million from Harris County.

=== Opening Houston Pavilions ===
The construction of Houston Pavilions ended in October 2008. The office building originally had no tenants. On June 30, 2009, Reliant Energy announced that it will take 10 floors in the Houston Pavilions tower. NRG Energy, which had acquired the retail operations of Reliant Energy, announced that it would take 234,000 square feet (21,700 m^{2}) of space in a 10-year lease. Houston Pavilions redesigned its space to make room for NRG. Geoffrey Jones, the co-developer of Houston Pavilions, stated that the complex administration planned to convert about 62,000 square feet (5,800 m^{2}) of retail and swing space into office space for NRG, and the Houston Pavilions management office decreased the amount of occupied space to make room for NRG.

=== New leases and development ===
Prior to January 2011, rumors stated that the 23,000-square-foot (2,100 m^{2}) Books-A-Million location was closing. In January 2011, the management of Houston Pavilions finalized an extension of the lease with Books-A-Million.

David Knox, an NRG spokesperson, said NRG employees and contractors had been moving into the 1201 Fannin St. from other locations since January 2011. Two weeks before March 17, 2011, the employees of NRG finished moved into 1201 Fannin St. Around March 17 the office building was renamed the NRG Tower.

In May 2011, the Downtown Redevelopment Authority of the City of Houston decided to release $3.3 million as loans, instead of cash, earlier on schedule to the developers after the developers asked for the funds as soon as possible. In December 2011 Mark Fowler, a receiver for Transwestern, took control of the development.

In 2012, NBC Sports and Comcast Sports created a studio in the center. Later that year, Canyon-Johnson Urban Funds and Houston-based Midway Cos. acquired the Houston Pavilions. In December 2012 the Books-a-Million closed.

=== GreenStreet ===
In 2013, the new developers, Midway and Canyon-Johnson, announced plans to add outdoor landscaping and outdoor patios for dining. The developers planned to add other amenities and to schedule events. Additionally, the complex was renamed to GreenStreet. Changes to the 568,294-square-foot (52,796.2 m^{2}) complex include removing the existing implements in the interior corridor and creating a new linear urban park, including the installation of unique water features at Caroline and Main. The linear urban park will span all three blocks and include mid-block crossings on Fannin and San Jacinto between Dallas and Polk. A central courtyard in the project block between Fannin and San Jacinto; outdoor patios.

On November 1, 2022, rapper Takeoff of the hip-hop group Migos was killed outside of 810 Billiards & Bowling on the second floor of the center.

== Signed tenants ==
In the office space, as of 2011 1,300 NRG Energy employees work in 263,000 square feet (24,400 m^{2}) of office space. To accommodate additional workers, Houston Pavilions converted some of its empty retail space into office space.

Kevin Howell, the president of NRG's Texas operations, said that certain characteristics of the Houston Pavilions office space; the high ceilings and the bright, open spaces; reflect the environment of the NRG corporate headquarters facility near Princeton, New Jersey.

Signed retail tenants of the development include:

- Clique Salon
- House of Blues
- Lucky Strike Lanes
- III Forks Steakhouse
- Andalucia Tapas Restaurant & Bar
- Forever 21
- Salata Salad Kitchen
- Pete's Dueling Piano Bar
- Guadalajara del Centro
- McCormick & Schmick's
- Yao's Restaurant and Bar
- Mia Bella
- Lucho Boutique
- Unity National Bank
- BCBG Max Azria
- Marble Slab Creamery
- Qatar Airways (ticket office)
- 810 Billiards & Bowling

The management office is on the third floor, in Suite 325. Suite 325 is above the center court.

== Gallery ==
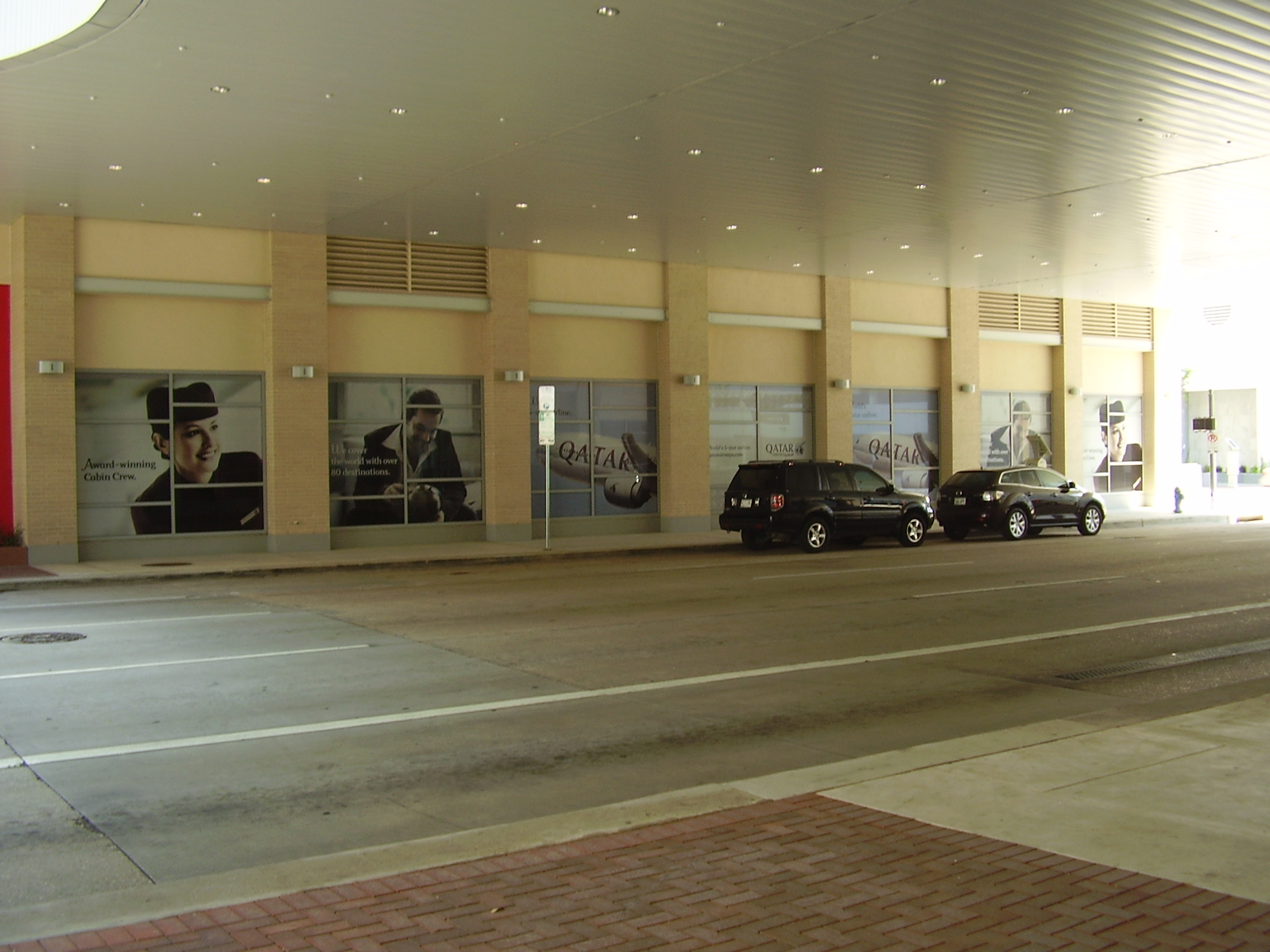
Qatar Airways office in the Houston Pavilions

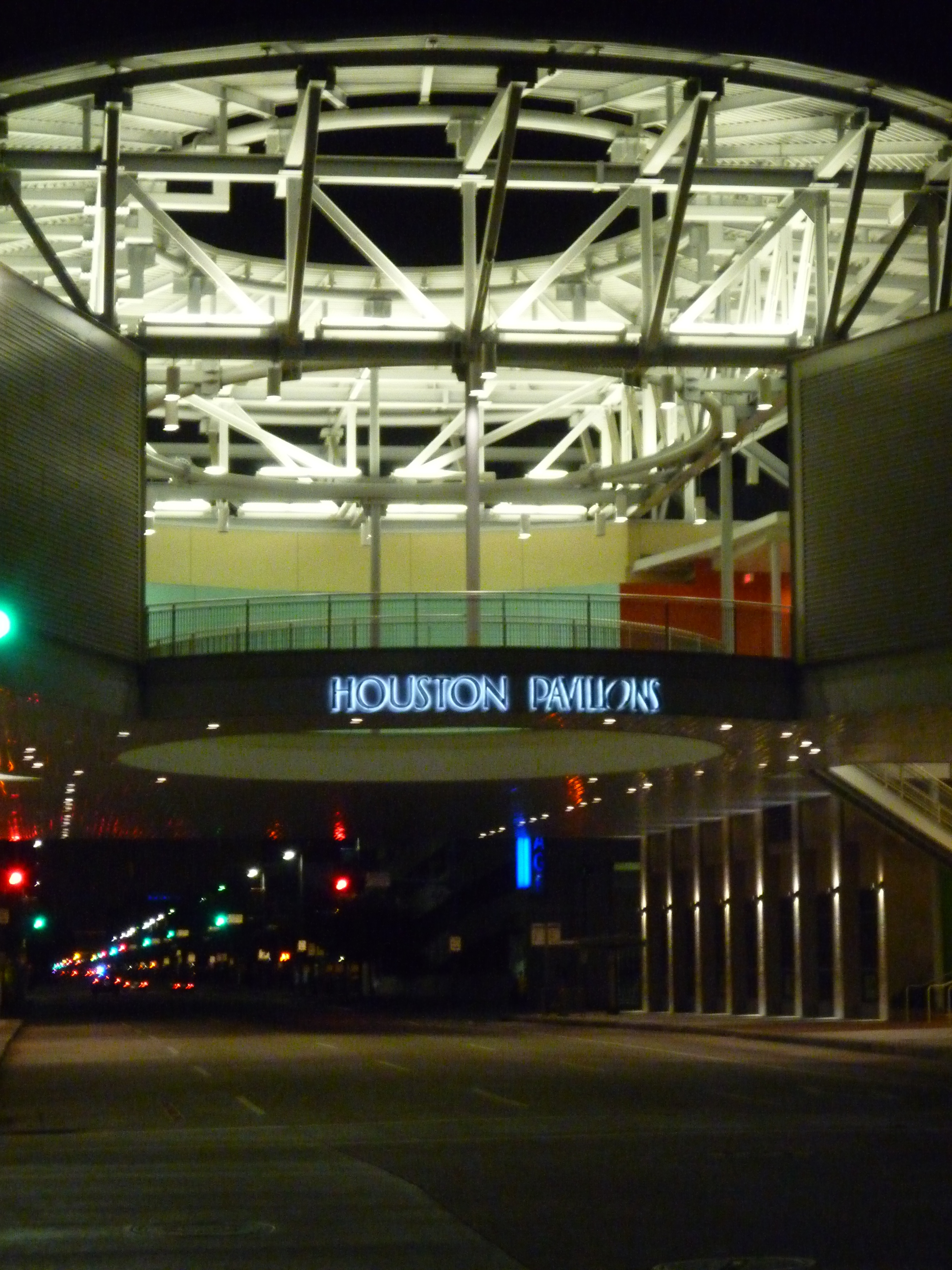
Houston Pavilions Logo as seen from corner of Fannin and Dallas

House of Blues under construction

== See also ==
- Denver Pavilions
- Houston Center
