= Valencia Hotel Group =

US privately held company

- Company type: Privately held company
- Industry: Hospitality
- Founded: Mid-1990s
- Headquarters: Houston, Texas, United States
- Key people: Doyle A. Graham, Jr., CEO & president Jeff Rawson, Managing Director; John Keeling, Executive Vice President; David Miller, CFO
- Website: www.valenciahotelgroup.com

Valencia Hotel Group is a privately held corporation based in Houston that has 8 hotel properties in the United States and several projects under development.

== History ==
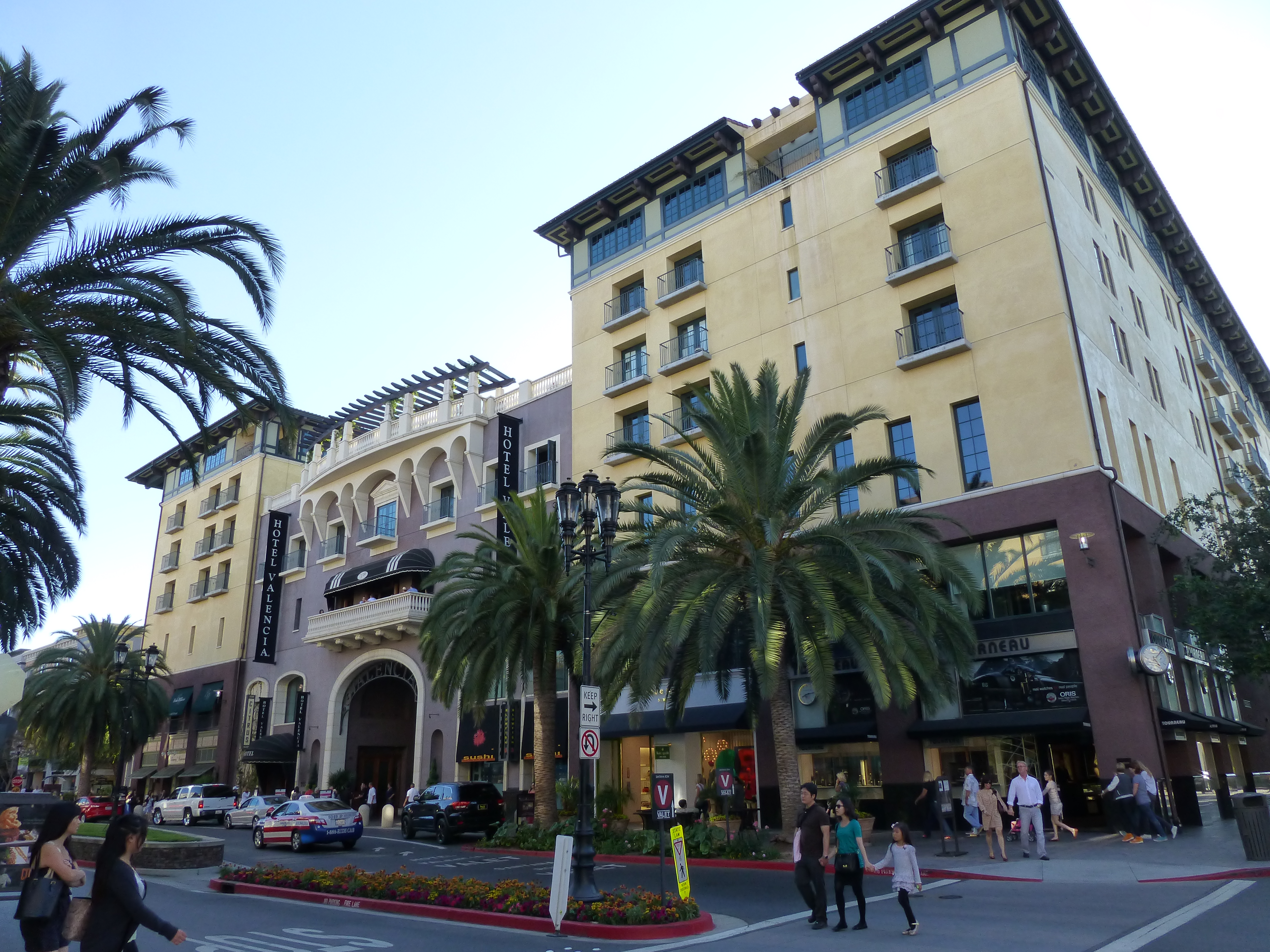
Hotel Valencia Santana Row, in San Jose, California

Valencia Hotel Group was founded in the mid-1990s by Doyle A. Graham, Sr., who was the managing director of the Hotel Galvez in Galveston in the late 1950s and early 1960s. His son, Doyle A. Graham Jr., serves as President and CEO.

In 2001, Federal Realty Investment Trust leased a site to the firm to develop an independent hotel on the San Antonio River Walk. It received a 99-year lease on the space, and opened Hotel Valencia Riverwalk in 2003. The hotel was included in Condé Nast Traveler magazine's list of the world's Top 100 new hotels in May 2004. Its success led the group to open Hotel Valencia Santana Row in San Jose, California.

In 2009, Hotel Sorella CityCentre opened in Houston in the mixed-use urban CityCentre development.

In 2013, Hotel Sorella Country Club Plaza was opened in Kansas City, MO and the Lone Star Court opened in the Domain mixed-use project in Austin, TX.

The group took over management of the Lancaster Hotel in downtown Houston in 2005 but declined to renew the management commitment after their three-year management agreement expired.

In 2017, the firm opened three hotels with Midway Development in downtown Houston and College Station, Texas: the 222-room Hotel Alessandra at the intersection of Dallas and Fannin streets in the GreenStreet mixed-use development downtown Houston.

In College Station, home of Texas A&M University, Valencia developed the 141-room Cavalry Court and Midway developed the 162-room The George, both in the Century Square mixed-use project in College Station. That same year the Hotel Sorella Country Club Plaza was sold by the owner Van Trust and the name was changed to La Fontaine.

In 2018, Valencia opened the 152-room Texican Court in the Las Colinas neighborhood of Irving, Texas.

In 2020, Valencia has plans to open the 169-room Cotton Court in downtown Lubbock, TX.

In 2014, both Valencia's and Hotel Sorella CITYCENTRE were rated by Condé Nast Traveler magazine's Readers' Choice Awards. Hotel Valencia Riverwalk and Hotel Sorella CITYCENTRE were ranked in the top 15 in Texas.

== Properties and brands ==
The hotels are set up in two brands, Valencia Hotels and Court Hotels. Valencia Hotels are larger and feature an old world European style. They are also located in exclusive locations.

The Court Hotels are smaller boutique hotels that aim at implementing local style. The Texican Court, for example, uses old west themes to bring out the Texan feel.

=== Valencia Hotels ===
- The George, a Valencia Hotel (College Station, Texas)
- Hotel Alessandra, by Valencia Hotel Group (Houston, Texas)
- Hotel Valencia Riverwalk (San Antonio, Texas)
- Hotel Valencia Santana Row (San Jose, California)

=== Court Hotels ===
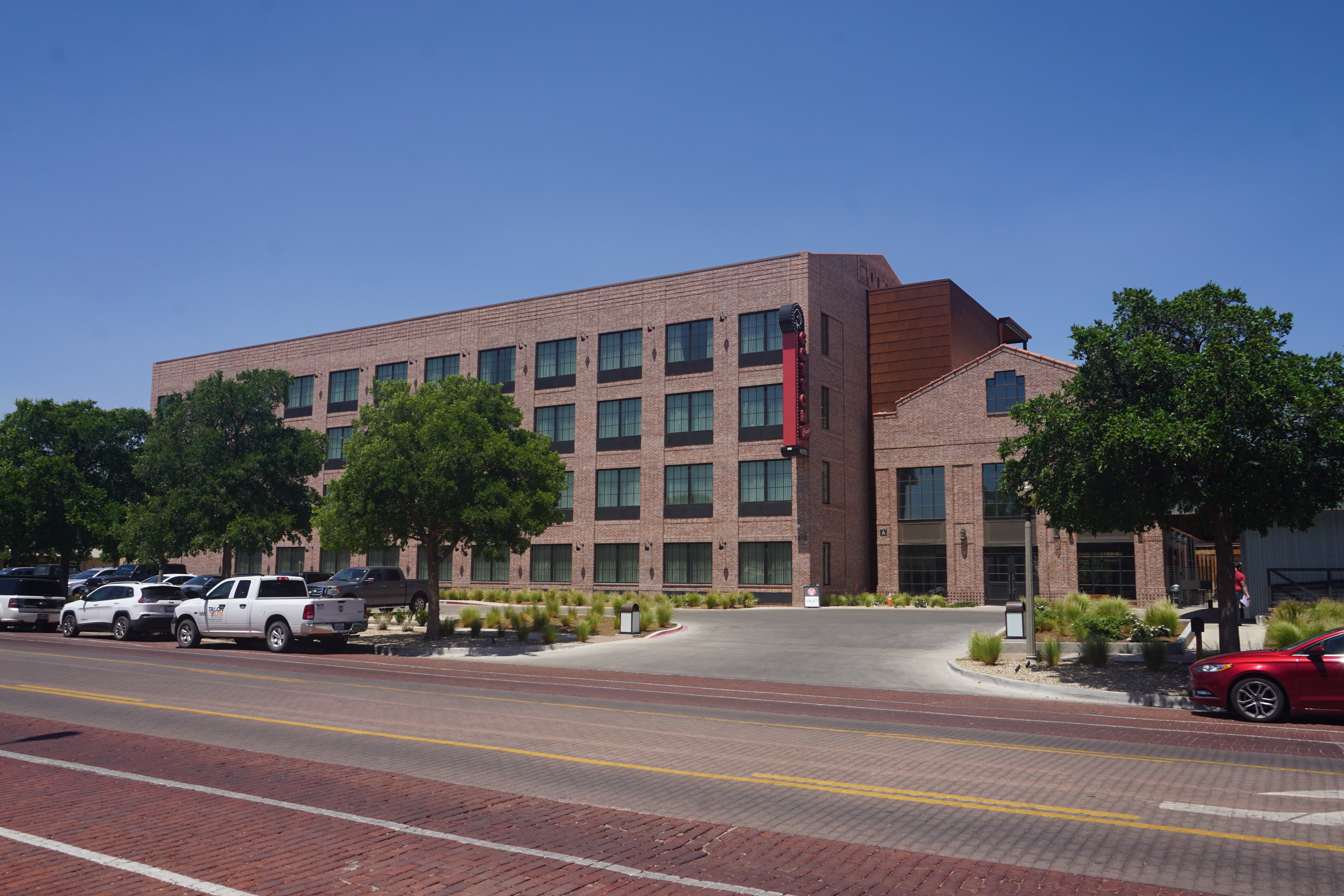
Cotton Court Hotel in Lubbock

- Cavalry Court (College Station, Texas)
- Cotton Court (Lubbock, Texas)
- Lone Star Court (Austin, Texas)
- Texican Court (Irving, Texas)
