= TEP =

TEP may refer to:

== Businesses and organizations ==
- TEP, the Society of Trust and Estate Practitioners members' post-nominal
- Tallgrass Energy Partners, an American oil and gas pipeline company
- Tau Epsilon Phi, a fraternity
- Transatlantic Economic Partnership
- Tucson Electric Power, the main power company in Tucson, Arizona

== Places in the United States ==
- The Equity Project, a charter school in New York
- Tucson Electric Park, Arizona

== Science and technology ==
=== Biology and medicine ===
- Tracheo-oesophageal puncture
- Transparent exopolymer particles, a type of polysaccharide
- Totally extraperitoneal herniorrhaphy

=== Chemistry ===
- Tolman electronic parameter, a measure of a characteristic of ligands
- Triethyl phosphate

=== Telecommunications ===
- Transequatorial propagation, a phenomenon associated with TV and FM DX (signal distance searching)
- Tunnel endpoint, for an IP tunnel in networking

== Other uses ==
- Thomas Edward Perez (born 1961), American politician and lawyer
- Test of English Proficiency (South Korea)
- Labour Party of Turkey, using the abbreviation 'TEP'

== See also ==
- Tep (disambiguation)
