= Gayler =

Gayler is a surname. Notable people with the surname include:

- Di Gayler (born 1948), Australian politician
- Herbert Gayler (1881–1917), British cyclist
- John Gayler (1943–2022), Australian politician
- Marie Laura Violet Gayler, English metallurgist
- Noel Gayler (1914–2011), American admiral
- William Gayler, United States Army major general
- Wolfgang Gayler (1934–2011), German conductor and pianist

== See also ==
- Mount Gayler, Arkansas
