= Playnormous =

Online community with public health goals

Playnormous was an online community of monster-themed games designed to change health behaviors in children and their parents. The games were developed in consultation with health researchers as a way to deliver game-based health interventions to the public at large. The games have been closed since 2016.

== Overview ==
Playnormous was a website that focused on teaching kids, ages 6 to 15, and their parents about health by playing casual games, watching animations, and creating a personal monster world. The creators of Playnormous aimed to use fun as a modality to educate and inspire families to make healthier lifestyle choices regarding nutrition and physical activity.

The basis for Playnormous was its health game catalog. Playnormous games fall under the category of games for health, a genera of serious games. The games and animations were conceptualized, designed, and field-tested with the help of medical researchers at the University of Texas Health Science Center at Houston and Baylor College of Medicine.

== History ==
The Playnormous site was created as a way to deliver successful health intervention programs to the public. The site was created by Playnormous, LLC, an online game developer based in Houston, Texas. Playnormous, LLC is a subsidiary of Archimage, an award-winning visual design studio and serious game developer. The Playnormous team was led by Playnormous President Jerald Reichstein, AIA. The subsidiary was founded on April 18, 2007, but the site did not go live until May 2008. Because the Playnormous website was designed using Adobe Flash, with the advent of mobile computing platforms and new browser technology that no longer supported Flash, Archimage retired Playnormous.com in August 2015.

== Playnormous Health Games ==
Food Fury was the first health game to be launched on the Playnormous site. Food Fury was originally funded by the Aetna Foundation as part of the Games for Wellness project conducted by Dr. Cynthia Phelps, assistant professor at the University of Texas Health Science Center. This online game targets 3rd–5th graders to teach and change behavior around food choice and portion control. Food Fury allows children to practice the CATCH method of food selection, known as "Go, Slow, Whoa". The game has been used in multiple settings including the YMCA's after school program to change nutrition behaviors in children.

== Research-based game development ==
Playnormous games were created using behavior-change theory as their foundation. Games were designed to change health behaviors by affecting mediators such as skills, confidence, and self-efficacy. This includes:

- Social cognitive theory: modeling healthy behaviors, enhancing skills, increasing confidence.
- Self-determination theory and theory of flow: fun experience, immediate feedback in games, and personal expression through monster world and avatar.
- Elaboration likelihood model: gain and maintain person's attention, immerse player in a fanciful monster world and story-based animations.
- Theory of planned behavior: increase player's belief that they have the power to change their diet or exercise habits.

Playnormous also used the research community to field test its games from conception to final product. Kids recruited by the Children's Nutrition Research Center played game prototypes. Dr. Cynthia Phelps of the University of Texas Health Science Center School of Health Information Sciences lead the beta testing team. The goal of testing the games was to ensure that they were not only educational and understandable, but also appealing and fun.
