= Tep Wireless =

Telecommunications company

- Company type: Private
- Industry: Telecommunications, Wi-Fi
- Headquarters: London, United Kingdom Houston, United States
- Website: tepwireless.com

Tep Wireless, branded as Tep, is a telecommunications company which provides mobile broadband for international travelers. The aim of the service is to prevent roaming fees for individuals going abroad, while keeping them connected to the Internet anywhere they go. The service is rendered via pre-paid MiFi devices (referred to as pocket WiFi devices), which are delivered to users before their trip or picked up at various airports. At the end of the user's trip, the MiFi (or WiFi) device is returned by post or dropped off at airports. Tep delivers its mobile broadband service through partnerships with global network operators, including Vodafone. The WiFi device can be ordered on the company's website, or those of Expedia or VisitBritain.DHI Telecom acquired Tep Wireless in October 2018 and continues to operate as a subsidiary.

== History ==
Tep Wireless was formerly known as Fonmigo, and in the past also offered smartphones with local numbers to international travelers. At the end of 2015, Tep expanded its service to allow travelers the choice of either renting or buying Tep's MiFi devices.

In October 2018, DHI Telecom acquired UK-based TEP Wireless to immediately expand the DHI market to include international travelers. TEP Wireless keeps its brand as a subsidiary of DHI Telecom. Global Travel While Staying Connected; BusinessWire (Press release).

In June 2019, DHI acquired French-based Travel WiFi to increase its presence in France and to provide customers with easy wi-fi hotspot pickup at airports in Paris. Travel WiFi will integrate its operations with Tep Wireless, subsidiary of DHI Telecom. DHI Telecom Acquires French-Based Travel WiFi; YahooFinance. In June 2019, DHI acquired Trinus, a mobile Wi-Fi provider based in Chile and Peru (Contxto).

== See also ==
- Boingo Wireless
- MiFi
- Roaming
