= Nutex Health =

American healthcare company

Nutex Health, Inc.
- Company type: Public company
- Traded as: Nasdaq: NUTX
- Industry: Health care
- Founders: Thomas Vo
- Headquarters: Houston, Texas, U.S.
- Area served: United States
- Key people: Thomas Vo (CEO)
- Website: nutexhealth.com

Nutex Health Inc. is an American for-profit health care company and operator of healthcare facilities headquartered in Houston, Texas.

== History ==
Nutex Health Inc. is a healthcare management and operations company with two divisions: a Hospital Division and a Population Health Management Division. The Hospital division currently owns and operates 21 facilities in eight different states. The Population Health Management division owns and operates provider networks such as Independent Physician Associations (IPAs). In February 2022, the company announced it was launching a reverse merger with health care technology company, Clinigence Holdings. It debuted at Nasdaq under ticker symbol NUTX. After the merger, plans were announced to open 20 more hospitals by 2024.
