= Mount Gayler, Arkansas =

- Unincorporated community
- Location within Arkansas Location within the United States
- Coordinates: 35°45′11″N 94°06′55″W
- Country: United States
- State: Arkansas
- County: Crawford
- Elevation: 2,083 ft (635 m)
- Time zone: UTC-6 (Central (CST))
  - Summer (DST): UTC-5 (CDT)
- Area code: 479
- GNIS feature ID: 72749

Mount Gayler (also spelled Gaylor) is an unincorporated community located at the peak of Gaylor Mountain in Crawford County, Arkansas. Mount Gayler is located within the Boston Mountain ecoregion of the Ozark Mountains. Gaylor Mountain is the highest point on the entire length of U.S. Route 71.

The area was once a popular tourist destination. Edward Bellis, Sr. came to the area with his family after the stock market crash of 1929. He purchased land from the original settlers of the area and proceeded to name his business after them. He built a gift shop and gas station to serve the needs of travelers. A steel observation tower was added in 1939. In 1937 a restaurant called Burns Gables opened across Highway 71, and a number of motel cabins and bungalows soon followed.

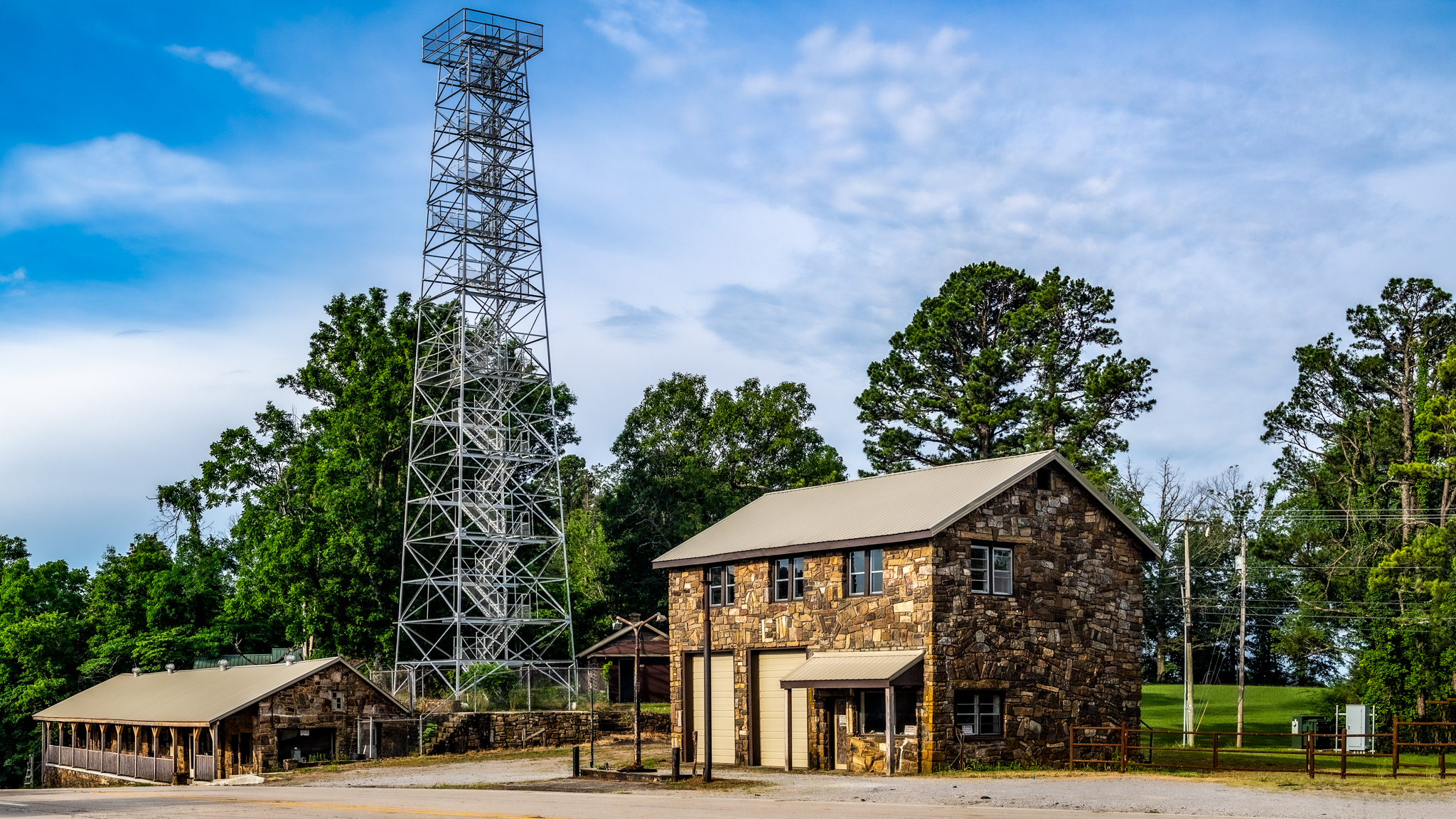
Mount Gayler Gift Shop and Observation Tower in 2020

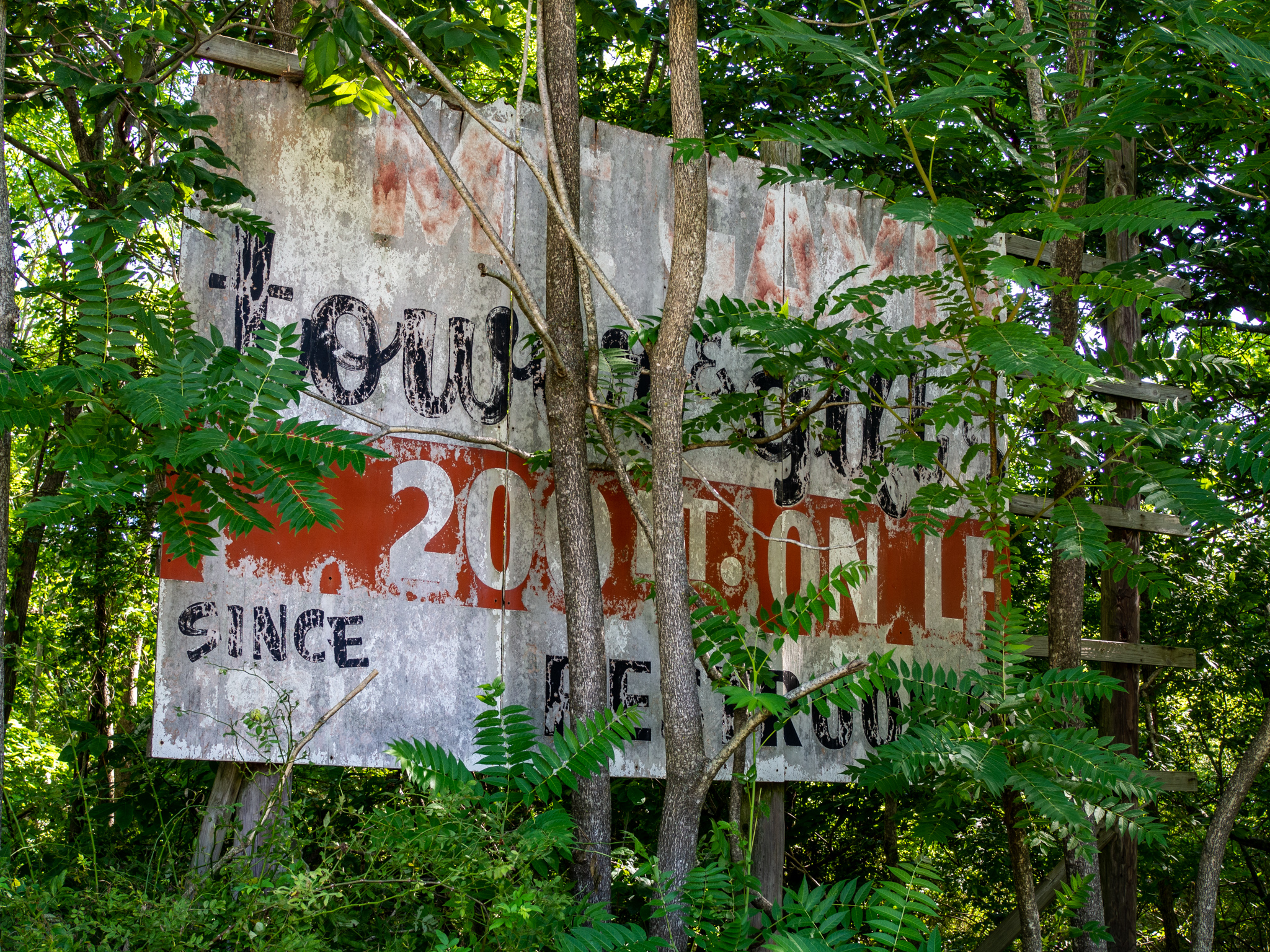
Original Sign Advertising Mount Gayler

In 1999 Interstate 49 opened between Mountainburg and Fayetteville and the majority of the personal and business traffic shifted to the new highway. The Mount Gayler gift shop and tower, as well as the Burns Gables restaurant are now closed, though other lodging and dining businesses in the area remain open.
