= Allis-Chalmers Energy =

American oil services and equipment company

Allis-Chalmers Energy Inc. is an American, Houston-based, oil company which provides both services and equipment to oil and natural gas companies throughout the Gulf of Mexico and in surrounding states and countries.

== History ==
The name "Allis-Chalmers" is most well known as the name of the former company, Allis-Chalmers Manufacturing Company. In February 2011, Allis-Chalmers Energy merged with Seawell to form specialist drilling and well service company Archer.
