= Al's Formal Wear =

- Industry: Clothing
- Founder: A. Haller
- Headquarters: Fort Worth, Texas
- Key people: Yetta Haller
- Products: Tuxedos

Al's Formal Wear was a chain of tuxedo rental stores that was founded by A. Haller, The business known as A. Haller Taylor shop on 311 Main street in Fort Worth, Texas in 1950. It has since expanded across many states, and was headquartered in Houston.

== History ==
After A. Haller died in 1950, there were disputes as to ownership and division of the entity, now known as Al's Formal Wear in Fort Worth. Due to the community law, the company passed to his spouse, Yetta Haller. A. Haller and Yetta Haller had three daughters, each of whom received one-third of the business. Al Sankary and Son Jerry H. Sankary flew to Los Angeles to enlist the firm of Sankary, Altshuler and Sachs. Joel Sachs was an attorney who specialized in Trust and Estates and was charged with the task of determining what family member owned what percentage of the business. Over the years, Sankary manipulated his way into purchasing portions of the company from Esther, Betty, and Lillian. Sankary continued to experiment with different concepts, including bridal stores, mall kiosks, manufacturing formal lines himself, uniform sourcing for the militarcleaning. He believed strongly in vertical integration; from manufacturing formal wear to retail renting to cleaning and then back on the rack.

In 1957, Sankary brought in his sister, Lillian and her husband, Alan Gaylor, into the business, which eventually grew to over 100 locations in Texas, Louisiana, Arkansas, Colorado, Mississippi and Oklahoma. Alan Gaylor and Al Sankary divided the business in 1978, with Gaylor maintaining ownership of the Al's Formal Wear operations based in Houston, while Sankary owned the operations based in the Dallas area. This division occasionally led to some customer confusion, but persisted until 1999, when Gaylor's Al's Formal Wear of Houston bought the Dallas operation from Sankary. At this point, the combined business included approximately 120 Al's Formal Wear, Ascot Tuxedos, and BridesMart locations in Texas, Louisiana, Oklahoma, and New Mexico. By 2006, some consolidation and the spin off of the bridal division reduced the number of tuxedo stores to between 90 and 100. After the purchase of Mr. Neat's Formalwear of Colorado, and an expansion into Arkansas and Mississippi, Al's Formal Wear encompassed six states with over 100 stores.

The company stocked over 50 brands and styles of tuxedos for rental. They also carried formal wear, accessories, and career apparel for retail purchase. Al's Formal Wear filled orders for weddings, high school proms, quinceaneras and other events from its distribution centers.

Al's Formal Wear was a family-owned business, with Alan Gaylor's son, Stuart Gaylor, as company president until 2017. In September 2017, Al's Formal Wear was sold to Tip Top Tux LLC who ran Al's Formal wear for the next 6 years.

Tip Top Tux LLC shut down the business in August 2023.
