= Powell Industries =

Manufacturing company

Powell Industries, Inc.
- Company type: Public
- Traded as: Nasdaq: POWL; S&P 600 Component
- Founded: 1947; 79 years ago
- Headquarters: Houston, Texas
- Key people: Brett Alan Cope (chairman, president, CEO)
- Products: Power Control Rooms, E-Houses, ANSI/IEC switchgear, MV and LV motor Control, LV switchgear, Bus Duct, Utility Transfer Switches, DC switchgear, bus duct, field services, and Power Management and Control Systems
- Website: powellind.com

Powell Industries, Inc. is a manufacturer of Integrated/Packaged Solutions and Electrical Equipment to monitor and control the distribution of electrical power in commercial and industrial markets founded in 1947. Its headquarters is in Houston, Texas.

The company is led by Brett Alan Cope, who is the Chairman, President and Chief Executive Officer.

Powell Industries Inc. reported annual revenue for 2022 of US$532,580,000, up from US$470,560,000 the year previous.

Products include Power Control Rooms, E-Houses, ANSI/IEC switchgear, MV and LV motor Control, LV switchgear, Bus Duct, Utility Transfer Switches, DC switchgear, bus duct, field services, and Power Management and Control Systems.

Markets served by Powell include Oil and Gas Refining, Offshore Oil and Gas Production, Petrochemical, Pipelines, Terminals, Pulp and Paper, Mining, Traction Power, Renewable Energy, and Utilities.
