= Denver Pavilions =

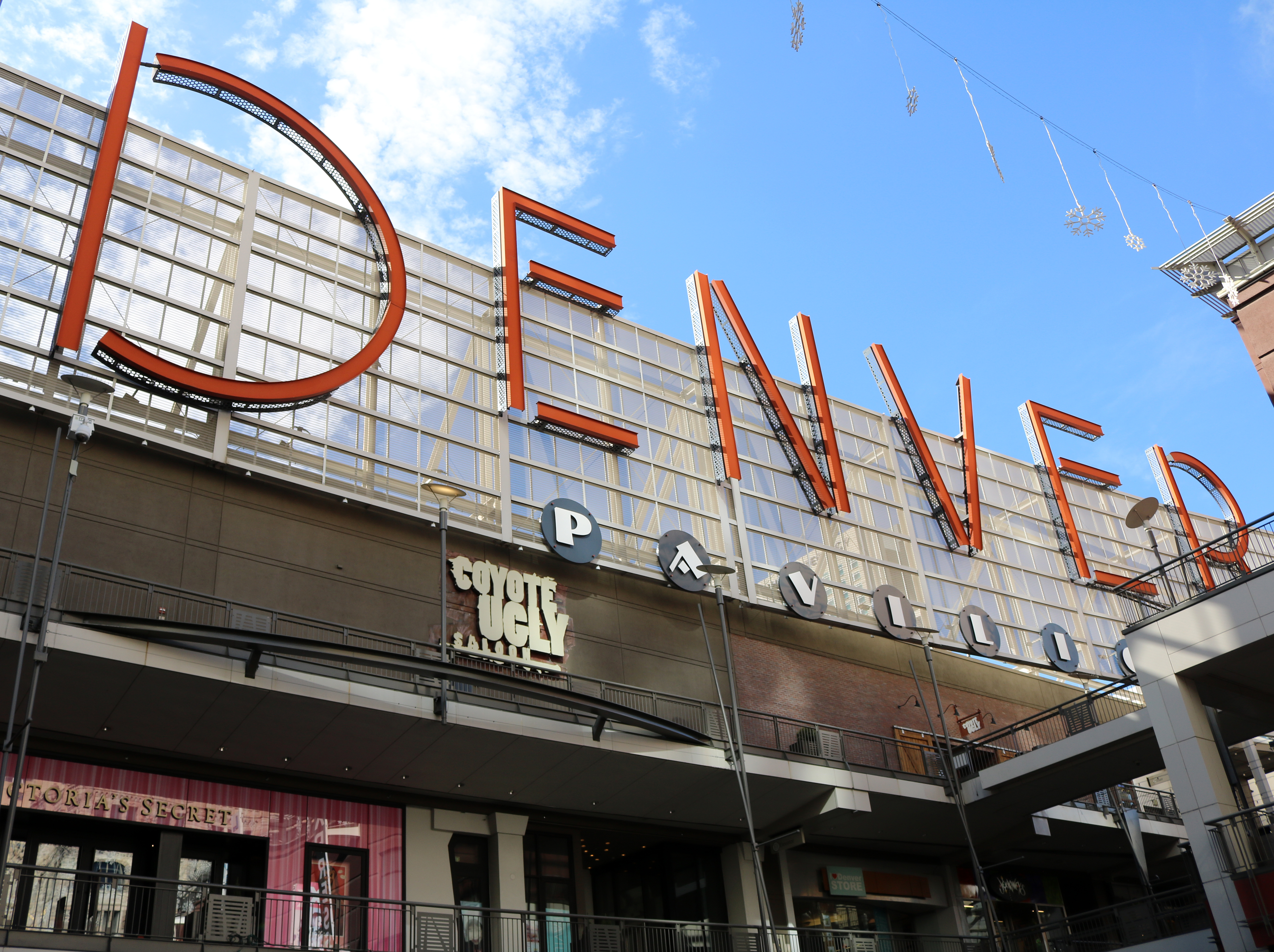
- The sign overlooking the mall.
- Location: Denver
- Coordinates: 39°44′36.33″N 104°59′27.55″W
- Address: 500 16th St., Denver, Colorado, 80202 USA
- Opened: 1998; 28 years ago
- Developer: Entertainment Development Group and Arthur Hill & Co.
- Manager: Gart Properties LLC
- Num. of stores: 40
- Floor area: 350,000 square feet (32,516.06 m^{2})
- Floors: 3
- Parking: 800
- Public transit: 16th & California Station, Free Mall Ride
- Website: www.denverpavilions.com

Denver Pavilions is a shopping mall located on the 16th Street Mall in Downtown Denver, Colorado. Originally opened in 1998, the mall has over 40 stores and restaurants.

An open-air mall, the Pavilions takes advantage of Denver's many sunny days. In addition to retail stores, the mall hosts several chain restaurants, including Maggianos, Corner Bakery, Coyote Ugly Saloon, Lucky Strike Lanes, Hard Rock Cafe, and others. The mall also houses a popular, 15-screen movie theater, and there is a large, underground parking garage.

The Denver Downtown Development Authority funded a study in 2026, which recommended significant renovations after demolishing most of the structure.
