= Travel Wifi =

DHI Telecom, LLC
- Type: Private
- Industry: Telecommunications
- Predecessor: SniperHill
- Founded: 2007
- Headquarters: Houston, Texas, U.S.
- Website: dhitelecom.com

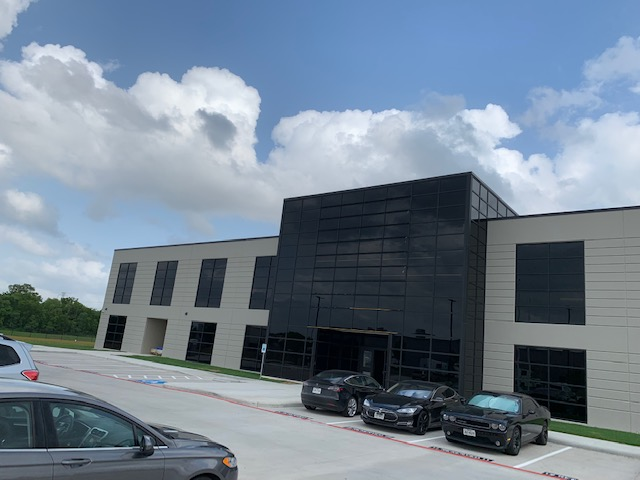

DHI Telecom, LLC is a US commercial Internet service provider (ISP) that operates on U.S. and NATO bases in the Middle East including Iraq, Kuwait, and Afghanistan. DHI provides wired, fiber-optic cable, mobile Wi-Fi, and wireless commercial Internet access to US, coalition armed forces, direct-hire DoD, Department of the Army and State Department civilians, authorized civilian contractors, and international businesses participating in Operation New Dawn and Operation Enduring Freedom. DHI has additional operations in the UAE, Jordan, The Congo, Poland and Romania.

== Summary ==
DHI Telecom competed against scores of companies for a contract with the DOD. On October 26, 2010 DHI was awarded a long-term DoD contract under the Army & Airforce Exchange Service, (The Exchange). As of September 2019, the company's operations on US and NATO bases throughout Afghanistan and Iraq are located in Baghdad, Kirkuk, and Um Qasr in Iraq and Bagram Airfield, Jalalabad, Kabul, Kandahar, Mazar e-Sharif, Camp Dwyer and Shindand Air Base in Afghanistan. DHI technology is also sold at The Exchange stores at major bases in Europe and the U.S.

=== Services ===
ISP services offer seven packages tiered by download speed and length of each plan. The different plans range from 24-hour service, up to 30 days of unlimited service. Businesses supporting US/NATO missions can opt for small business plans.

In 2017 DHI Telecom launched Sapphire International Mobile Wi-Fi Hotspots. The pocket-sized devices use CloudSIM technology to connect in 130+ countries without SIM cards and local carrier plans. The Sapphire device connects to the strongest cellular signal and provides a secure Wi-Fi hub with up to 4G LTE speeds and can connect up to five internet devices such as smartphones, laptops, and tablets to a private hub. https://www.sapphirego.com/

=== Access ===
Users can auto-obtain wireless connectivity using Dynamic Host Configuration Protocol (DHCP)-IP addressing. Upon launching their web browsers, subscribers are redirected to a captive portal homepage where they can either sign up for new accounts or logon to existing accounts. Android and iOS mobile apps for Sapphire data plans are also available.

=== Technology ===
In each area of operation, technicians position a satellite earth station and erect and operate a main communication tower. Sectoral flat panel antennas affixed to the main tower provide 360-degree coverage for up to three square kilometers. A point-to-multi-point or terrestrial fiber optic backbone distributes and allocates bandwidth throughout the combat living areas. Each communication tower transmits an encrypted “invisible” signal through the use of licensed frequencies to commercial-grade wireless router antennas and wireless access points located throughout each US base. Data is encrypted between the company's hosts using the Advanced Encryption Standard (AES)-256 encryption algorithm. Sapphire mobile Wi-Fi devices are designed for 4G LTE speeds.

== Criticisms ==
=== Costs ===
Operating an ISP inside war zones is costly due to the remote infrastructure, unconventional methodology, danger placed upon employees in harm's way and use of satellites that are required to get the bandwidth in and out of the OIF theatre. None of these constraints exist in the U.S. and other developed parts of the world. Also, bandwidth costs in the U.S. and elsewhere are nowhere near those found in Iraq because of America's Internet and Wi-Fi infrastructure, the surplus of fiber optic backbones and high speed cable lines to propagate bandwidth. With the infrastructure in place now within these camps, the Garrison Command ensures no soldier directly interferes, tampers, or destroys any of the wireless capabilities the Sniperhill contract has brought. The most common repair to such equipment is from normal wear and tear from the excessive heat and sand. Occasionally interference occurs from the hosting teleport.

Soldiers performing logistical operations within DHI's area of operation temporarily RON (rest overnight) at these camps. The "Target Practice" service is the most widely used option for the troops whose obligations involve convoy movement, as their stay is most likely to be less than 48 hours. This service costs $10 a day.

=== Latency ===
Network latency is the delay between requesting data and getting a response, or in the case of one-way communication, between the actual moment of broadcast and the time actually received at destination. Compared to ground-based communication such as fiber optics or cable lines, geostationary satellite communications experience higher latency than that of ground-based communications due to the signal having to travel 22,000 miles out into space to a satellite in geostationary orbit and back to Earth again.

=== Limitations ===
The signal delay can be as much as 900 milliseconds or more, which makes most satellite-based Internet service unusable and unstable for applications requiring real-time user input, such as online games or remote surgery. The functionality of live interactive access to a distant computer can also be subject to these problems caused by high latency. These problems are more than tolerable for just basic email access and web browsing and in most cases are barely noticeable but are problematic for real-time applications and those requiring large amounts of bandwidth such as 512 kbit/s or 1 Mbit/s.

== History ==
DHI Telecom began its first operations in Iraq in July 2007 as SniperHill Internet Services, LLC, by Wallace Davis and Jerry Hartless. SniperHill began providing internet services in Iraq in 2007. In March 2009, the company rebranded its webpage and slogan from "surf the net safely" to "Click | Move | Communicate," an adaption of U.S. Army jargon, "shoot, move, communicate." According to a report in 2010, SniperHill was the first American ISP to bring fiber-optic Internet services to U.S. forces in Iraq. On October 26, 2011, DHI Telecom was awarded a long-term contract by The Army & Air Force Exchange Service (AAFES), The Exchange, to provide in-room Internet services on U.S. and NATO bases throughout Afghanistan. In December 2011, SniperHill/Iraq was awarded a similar contract by The Exchange to provide the same services in Iraq. In early 2012, the Sniperhill company name was replaced with DHI Telecom Group in Afghanistan and IQSTC Communications in Iraq. In July 2017, DHI launched Sapphire, a wireless hotspot that provides wireless internet connectivity in over 100+ countries. In May 2018, Sapphire devices are sold through Army and Air Force Exchange Service stores overseas (Military.com).

Sapphire Wi-Fi devices have connectivity in 130+ countries. In October 2018, DHI acquired UK-based TEP Wireless to immediately expand the DHI market to include international travelers. Global Travel While Staying Connected; BusinessWire (Press release).
