= Alan B. Gaylor =

American businessman

Alan B. Gaylor (August 19, 1926 – April 15, 2008) was a Houston businessman best known as the founder of Al's Formal Wear. He attended the University of Tulsa on the G.I. Bill, graduating in 1950 with a bachelor's degree in marketing and accounting.

== Education ==
Gaylor was born in Tulsa, Oklahoma and attended the University of Tulsa on the G.I. Bill, graduating in 1950 with a bachelor's degree in marketing and accounting. After graduation, he took a job with Acme Brick, who relocated him to Topeka, Kansas. At that time, he and his brother-in-law Al Sankary began talking about going into business together.

== Business interests ==
In 1957, Gaylor and his wife Lillian opened their first Al's Formal Wear Al's Formal Wear tuxedo shop in downtown Houston, Texas. In 1966, after moving the tuxedo store to a larger location nearby, the Gaylors opened their first Bride 'n Formal store in the original Al's space. Bride 'n Formal offered moderately-priced bridal gowns, bridesmaids' dresses, and formal dresses, and the two businesses created a cross-referral synergy.

Gaylor and brother-in-law Al Sankary divided the business in 1978, with Gaylor maintaining ownership of the Al's Formal Wear operations based in Houston, while Sankary owned the operations based in the Dallas area. This division occasionally led to some customer confusion, but persisted until 1999 (see below).

In the late 1980s, Gaylor opened a new upscale bridal boutique, Louise Blum, named for his mother. He also began a new line of Ascot Tuxedos stores to expand into the area served by the Al's of Dallas operation. In the early 1990s, Gaylor opened an upscale men's formal wear shop, A.B. Graham, named for his first grandson. He also expanded his bridal business again with Bridal Warehouse, an off-the-rack bridal gown store designed to serve the price shopper. In 1995, Bridal Warehouse and Bride 'n Formal were merged into BridesMart, offering both special-order and off-the-rack bridal shopping in one location. The synergy between the bridal business and the tuxedo business continued, with BridesMart locations typically located near (or even next to) Al's Formal Wear and Ascot Tuxedos locations.

Al's Formal Wear had always been a family business, and 1999 saw the family come together again as his Al's Formal Wear of Houston bought the Dallas operation from Sankary. At this point, the combined business included approximately 120 Al's Formal Wear, Ascot Tuxedos, and BridesMart locations in Texas, Louisiana, Oklahoma, and New Mexico. By 2006, some consolidation and the spinoff of the bridal division has reduced the number of stores to between 90 and 100. After expanding into Arkansas and the purchase of Mr. Neat's Formalwear of Colorado, Al's Formal Wear now encompasses five states with over 100 stores.

After more than 50 years of building a tuxedo empire for his family, Gaylor turned over the presidency to his son Stuart in 2001.

== Death ==
Gaylor died on the morning of April 15, 2008. He was survived by four children and 12 grandchildren.

== Awards and recognition ==
- In 1992, Gaylor was a finalist for the Ernst & Young Entrepreneur of the Year award.
- In 1995, he was presented with the International Formalwear Association Black Tie Award in recognition of his lifetime contribution to the men's formal wear industry.
