= Archimage =

- Industry: Video games
- Headquarters: Houston, USA

Archimage is a Houston-based visual arts studio that has used its experience in computer-based architecture to specialize in serious video game development for the medical research community. Archimage created Escape From Diab and Nanoswarm: Invasion from Inner Space, two multimillion-dollar PC games funded by the National Institutes of Health to combat obesity and type 2 diabetes in children.

== Early history ==
Archimage, Inc was formed in Houston, Texas in 1990. The firm is the successor to Buday Wells, Architects, (Richard Buday, AIA and Dwayne Wells, AIA, RIBA partners) formed in 1983.

Throughout most of its history, Archimage has been the poster child for creative companies successfully adapting to rapidly changing market conditions. Buday Wells, Architects, which opened during a severe contraction in Houston's oil-based economy, was an early pioneer in the use of computers in architecture. When founding partner Dwayne Wells died in 1990, the company incorporated as Archimage to more fully reflect its hybrid design practice. A variety of non-traditional architecture commissions such as broadcast television commercials resulted in the company winning 14 Caddie awards for its innovative computer-based design work in the architecture world.

The visibility Archimage gained from its commissions and awards resulted in work expanding into mainstream animation. In 1992, Nintendo of America used the firm to create an animated trade show presentation, and business from the Walt Disney Company soon followed with the design of "Happy Castle." In 1994, Archimage was enlisted to create 3D games and environments for 3D Dinosaur Adventure.

== Serious Video Game Design and Production ==
Much of Archimage's recent work has been in a new area of interactive media called Games for Health, a genera of serious games. Their work in this field began by creating interactive tools for researchers at Baylor College of Medicine in the early '90s, which was later followed by the production and design of several multimedia behavioral interventions research projects created for kids. Archimage is one of the few design firms in this specialized area of game design.

In 2003, the firm was awarded a Small Business Innovative Research Grant from the National Institute of Diabetes and Digestive and Kidney Diseases, a division of the National Institutes of Health, to create two computer-based interventions for childhood obesity and Type 2 Diabetes. Archimage worked with behavior psychologists, nutritionists, and physical activity experts at the Children's Nutrition Research Center of Baylor College of Medicine to create two epic PC adventure video games about healthy eating and exercise entitled Escape from Diab and Nanoswarm: Invasion from Inner Space. Escape From Diab won several design awards including a Horizon Interactive Media Award, a Webby Award Nomination and an INDEX Award. Both games have gone under extensive clinical testing by BCM for efficacy in changing children's diet and exercise behaviors.

With the knowledge gained from these two large serious game projects, Archimage transformed its design practice again in 2007 with a new focus on Web-based health game development. Playnormous was created as a way to give the general public access to research-based health games. Playnormous games are also created with the guidance of the medical community from Baylor College of Medicine and The University of Texas Health Science Center and are designed to change nutrition and physical activity lifestyle behaviors in children and their parents.
