= Tep Sothy =

Tep Sothy ទេព សុទ្ធី
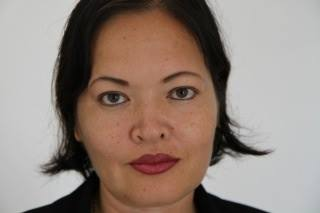
- Tep Sothy

Member of Parliament for Takeo
- In office 5 August 2014 – 16 November 2017

Personal details
- Born: 13 February 1973 (age 53) Kampong Cham province, Cambodia
- Party: Cambodia National Rescue Party
- Other political affiliations: Human Rights Party
- Spouse: John M. Ofstie (m. 2010)
- Education: Illinois State University (Ed.D.); Loyola of Chicago (M.Ed.)

Tep Sothy (Khmer: ទេព សុទ្ធី; born February 13, 1973) is a Cambodian politician and former Member of Parliament for Takeo province. She represented the Takeo province since the Cambodia National Rescue Party won 55 seats in 2013 Cambodian general election. Before coming to Cambodia, Sothy was a high school teacher in Chicago. In 2010, she decided to join Cambodia's Human Rights Party established and led by Kem Sokha who previously led the Cambodian Center for Human Rights in Phnom Penh for several years. Tep decided to move to Cambodia shortly before the 2013 National Elections. She told Voice of America Khmer Service in 2010 that she joined the political party because Kem Sokha was really "a great, moral, freedom-seeking leader." In 2012, the Sam Rainsy Party and the Human Rights Party, Cambodia's two major political parties merged to form the Cambodia National Rescue Party. Her work in Cambodia includes campaigns with women to improve gender awareness, introduction of gender sensitive laws, and policies to address issues on health, children's welfare, domestic violence, reproduction, and migrant workers rights.
