= WidgetCo, Inc. =

Retail and manufacturing company based in Houston, Texas, US

- Industry: Manufacturing, E-Commerce
- Headquarters: Houston, Texas, U.S.
- Area served: Worldwide
- Products: Household hardware, Cork, Builders hardware
- Website: widgetco.com

WidgetCo, Inc. is an e-commerce and manufacturing company headquartered in Houston, Texas, United States. WidgetCo products have been featured by Better Homes and Gardens and Gawker Media. WidgetCo manufactures and distributes metal, plastic, cork, rubber and wood products to businesses and individuals worldwide.

== Services ==
The company is involved in the upcycling of wine closures. WidgetCo offers bulk wine corks to consumers and crafters.
