= Gaylor Curier =

French basketball player

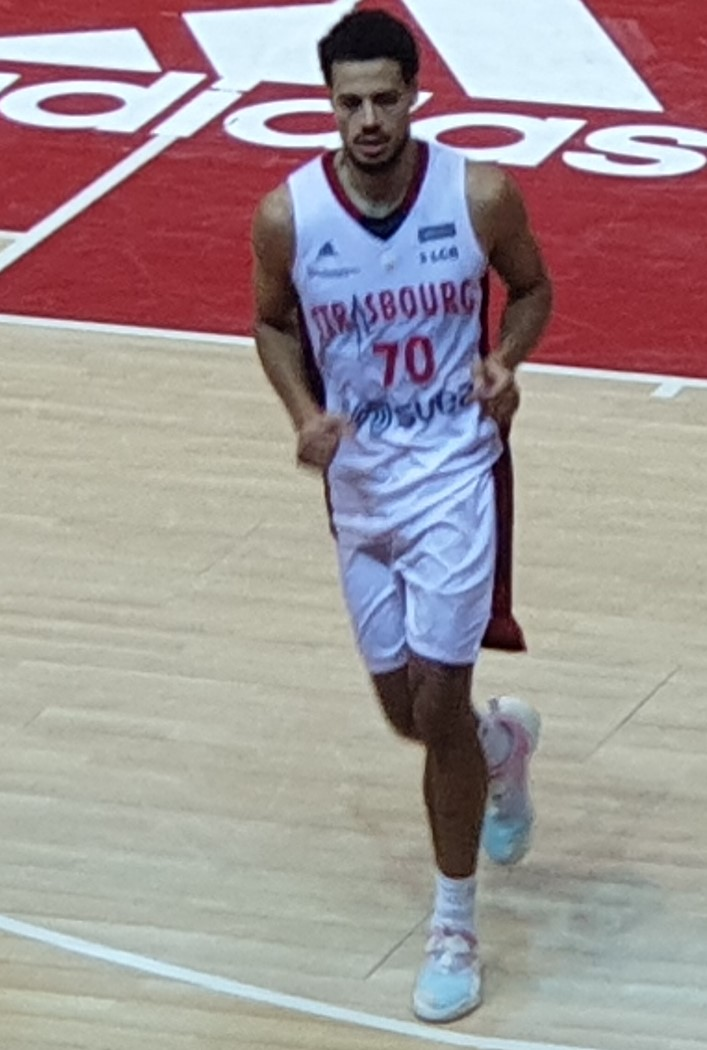
- Curier with Strasbourg in February 2022

Free Agent
- Position: Shooting guard / small forward

Personal information
- Born: 4 February 1992 (age 34) Massy, Essonne, France
- Listed height: 1.97 m (6 ft 6 in)

Career information
- Playing career: 2012–present

Career history
- 2012–2014: Limoges CSP
- 2014–2015: Angers BC 49
- 2015–2016: BC Souffelweyersheim
- 2016–2017: Rouen Métropole Basket
- 2017–2020: Orléans Loiret Basket
- 2021: BCM Gravelines-Dunkerque
- 2021: Lille Métropole BC
- 2021–2022: SIG Strasbourg
- 2022–2023: Cholet Basket

Career highlights
- LNB Pro A Champion (2014)

Gaylor Curier is a French basketball player who last played for Cholet Basket of the French LNB Pro A.

== Personal ==
Curier measures 1.96 m.

He is a native of Massy, Essonne.

== Professional career ==
Curier started his career playing for sub teams of Élan Béarnais. He later transferred to Limoges CSP where he won the French national championship in 2014.

After leaving Limoges, he went on to play for the LNB Pro B team Angers BC 49.

During the 2015/15 LNB Pro B season, he played for BC Souffelweyersheim. Later, he joined league competitor Rouen Métropole Basket. In the following years he played for Orléans Loiret Basket and BCM Gravelines-Dunkerque.

In February 2021, he joined Lille Métropole BC.

In July 2021, he joined SIG Strasbourg.

On August 9, 2022, he has signed with Cholet Basket of the French LNB Pro A.

== Player profile ==
In 2021, SIG Strasbourg's coach Lassi Tuovi stated that Strasbourg acquired Curier because of his shooting ability and his flexibility as Curier can play multiple positions.
