= Salata Salad Kitchen =

American fast casual restaurant chain

Salata
- Company type: private
- Industry: Fast casual
- Founded: 2005
- Founder: Berge Simonian
- Headquarters: Houston, Texas, U.S.
- Number of locations: 101
- Area served: Texas, California, Louisiana, Georgia, North Carolina
- Website: www.salata.com

Salata is an American fast casual chain of restaurants that specializes in salad and wraps. They were founded in 2005 and have since experienced rapid growth. The average dinner check is $14, which includes a protein, and a beverage such as lemonade or organic tea. But a basic salad costs $8 and wraps start at $7.

== History ==
Berge Simonian opened the original Salata in the underground tunnel system in Downtown Houston after a previous restaurant concept had an increasingly growing salad bar. Since the salad bar was becoming more and more popular, he decided to focus on it and perfect it.
