= List of Michelin-starred restaurants in Chengdu =

The Michelin Guides have been published by the French tire company Michelin since 1900. They were designed as a guide to tell drivers about eateries they recommended to visit and to subtly sponsor their tires, by encouraging drivers to use their cars more and therefore need to replace the tires as they wore out. Over time, the stars that were given out started to become more valuable.

Multiple anonymous Michelin inspectors visit the restaurants several times. They rate the restaurants on five criteria: "quality of products", "mastery of flavor and cooking techniques", "the personality of the chef represented in the dining experience", "value for money", and "consistency between inspectors' visits". Inspectors have at least ten years of expertise and create a list of popular restaurants supported by media reports, reviews, and diner popularity. If they reach a consensus, Michelin awards restaurants from one to three stars based on its evaluation methodology: One star means "high-quality cooking, worth a stop", two stars signify "excellent cooking, worth a detour", and three stars denote "exceptional cuisine, worth a special journey". The stars are not permanent and restaurants are constantly being re-evaluated. If the criteria are not met, the restaurant will lose its stars.

2022 was the inaugural edition of the Michelin Guide for Chengdu. The 2025 edition awarded Mi Xun Teahouse a Green Star which is launched in 2020 worldwide to honor restaurants that are committed to more sustainable and eco-friendly gastronomy.

== 2022–2027 list ==
Key
1 Michelin star	One Michelin star
2 Michelin stars	Two Michelin stars
3 Michelin stars	Three Michelin stars
—	The restaurant did not receive a star that year

Michelin-starred restaurants
Name	Cuisine	2022	2023	2024	2025	2026	2027
Chaimen Hui (柴门荟)	Sichuan	1 Michelin star	1 Michelin star	1 Michelin star	1 Michelin star	1 Michelin star	1 Michelin star
Chengdu Restaurant (成都宴)	Sichuan	1 Michelin star	1 Michelin star	—	—	—	—
Co-	Innovative	—	—	—	—	1 Michelin star	1 Michelin star
Fang Xiang Jing (芳香景)	Sichuan	1 Michelin star	1 Michelin star	1 Michelin star	1 Michelin star	1 Michelin star	1 Michelin star
Focus by Bill Yue	Innovative	—	—	—	—	—	1 Michelin star
Fu Rong Huang (芙蓉凰)	Sichuan	—	1 Michelin star	1 Michelin star	1 Michelin star	1 Michelin star	1 Michelin star
Hokkien Cuisine (福满楼)	Fujian	—	—	1 Michelin star	1 Michelin star	1 Michelin star	1 Michelin star
Ma's Kitchen (马旺子)	Sichuan	1 Michelin star	1 Michelin star	1 Michelin star	1 Michelin star	1 Michelin star	1 Michelin star
Mi Xun Teahouse (谧寻茶室)	Vegetarian	1 Michelin star	1 Michelin star	1 Michelin star	1 Michelin star	1 Michelin star	1 Michelin star
S Kitchen (偲厨)	French Contemporary	—	—	1 Michelin star	1 Michelin star	—	—
Silver Pot (银锅)	Sichuan	1 Michelin star	1 Michelin star	1 Michelin star	1 Michelin star	1 Michelin star	1 Michelin star
Song Yun Ze (松云泽)	Sichuan	1 Michelin star	1 Michelin star	1 Michelin star	—	—	—
The Hall (会館)	European Contemporary	—	—	—	1 Michelin star	1 Michelin star	1 Michelin star
Xin Rong Ji (新荣记)	Taizhou	—	—	2 Michelin stars	2 Michelin stars	2 Michelin stars	3 Michelin stars
Xu's Cuisine (许家菜)	Sichuan	1 Michelin star	1 Michelin star	1 Michelin star	1 Michelin star	1 Michelin star	1 Michelin star
Young Art · Yong Ya He Xian (漾亚·雍雅合鲜（桐梓林东路)	Sichuan	—	1 Michelin star	1 Michelin star	1 Michelin star	1 Michelin star	1 Michelin star
Yu Zhi Lan (玉芝兰)	Sichuan	2 Michelin stars	2 Michelin stars	2 Michelin stars	2 Michelin stars	2 Michelin stars	2 Michelin stars
Zinan	Sichuan	—	—	—	—	—	1 Michelin star
Reference							

== See also ==
- List of Michelin-starred restaurants in Beijing
- List of Michelin-starred restaurants in Guangzhou
- List of Michelin-starred restaurants in Hangzhou
- List of Michelin-starred restaurants in Hong Kong and Macau
- List of Michelin-starred restaurants in Shanghai
- List of Michelin-starred restaurants in Taiwan
- Lists of restaurants
