= List of Michelin-starred restaurants in Guangzhou and Shenzhen =

As of the 2024 Michelin Guide, there are 20 restaurants in Guangzhou with a Michelin star rating. The Michelin Guides have been published by the French tire company Michelin since 1900. They were designed as a guide to tell drivers about eateries they recommended to visit and to subtly sponsor their tires, by encouraging drivers to use their cars more and therefore need to replace the tires as they wore out. Over time, the stars that were given out became more valuable.

Multiple anonymous Michelin inspectors visit the restaurants several times. They rate the restaurants on five criteria: "quality of products", "mastery of flavor and cooking techniques", "the personality of the chef represented in the dining experience", "value for money", and "consistency between inspectors' visits". Inspectors have at least 10 years of expertise and create a list of popular restaurants supported by media reports, reviews, and diner popularity. If they reach a consensus, Michelin awards restaurants from one to three stars based on its evaluation methodology: one star means "high-quality cooking, worth a stop", two stars signify "excellent cooking, worth a detour", and three stars denote "exceptional cuisine, worth a special journey". The stars are not permanent and restaurants are constantly re-evaluated. If the criteria are not met, the restaurant will lose its stars.

The 2018 edition was the first edition of the Guangzhou Michelin Guide to be published. The 2024 edition awarded Yong a Green Star, an award launched in 2020 to honor restaurants that are committed to more sustainable and eco-friendly gastronomy. Beginning in 2026, Michelin has expanded coverage of the region to include Shenzhen.

== Lists ==
=== 2021–2026 list ===
Key
1 Michelin star	One Michelin star
2 Michelin stars	Two Michelin stars
—	The restaurant did not receive a star that year
Closed	The restaurant is no longer open

Michelin-starred restaurants
Name	Cuisine	Location	2021	2022	2023	2024	2025	2026
The Bay by Chef Fei	Cantonese	Shenzhen	—	—	—	—	—	2 Michelin stars
Bing Sheng Mansion 炳勝公館	Cantonese	Tianhe	1 Michelin star	1 Michelin star	1 Michelin star	1 Michelin star	1 Michelin star	1 Michelin star
Bing Sheng Private Kitchen 炳勝私廚	Cantonese	Tianhe	1 Michelin star	1 Michelin star	1 Michelin star	1 Michelin star	1 Michelin star	1 Michelin star
Chao Shang Chao	Chao Zhou	Shenzhen	—	—	—	—	—	1 Michelin star
Chōwa	Cantonese	The Canton Place in Tianhe	—	—	—	—	1 Michelin star	1 Michelin star
Ensue	Innovative	Shenzhen	—	—	—	—	—	1 Michelin star
Famous Cuisine 半島名軒	Cantonese	Tianhe	1 Michelin star	1 Michelin star	—	—	—	—
Fumée	Innovative	Shenzhen	—	—	—	—	—	1 Michelin star
Hongtu Hall 宏图府	Dim sum	White Swan Hotel in Liwan	1 Michelin star	1 Michelin star	1 Michelin star	1 Michelin star	1 Michelin star	1 Michelin star
Imperial Treasure Fine Chinese Cuisine 御寶軒	Cantonese	Tianhe	2 Michelin stars	2 Michelin stars	2 Michelin stars	2 Michelin stars	2 Michelin stars	2 Michelin stars
Imperial Treasure Fine Teochew Cuisine 御寶阁潮州酒家	Chaozhou	Taikoo Hui Guangzhou in Tianhe	1 Michelin star	1 Michelin star	1 Michelin star	1 Michelin star	1 Michelin star	1 Michelin star
Jade River 玉堂春暖	Cantonese	White Swan Hotel in Liwan	1 Michelin star	1 Michelin star	1 Michelin star	1 Michelin star	1 Michelin star	1 Michelin star
Jiang By Chef Fei 江	Cantonese	Tianhe	2 Michelin stars	2 Michelin stars	2 Michelin stars	2 Michelin stars	2 Michelin stars	2 Michelin stars
Lai Heen 麗軒	Cantonese	Ritz Carlton Guangzhou in Tianhe	1 Michelin star	1 Michelin star	1 Michelin star	1 Michelin star	1 Michelin star	1 Michelin star
Lei Garden (Yuexiu) 利苑(越秀店)	Cantonese	Yuexiu	1 Michelin star	1 Michelin star	1 Michelin star	1 Michelin star	1 Michelin star	1 Michelin star
Lingnan House 廣御軒	Cantonese	Rosewood Guangzhou in Tianhe	1 Michelin star	1 Michelin star	1 Michelin star	1 Michelin star	1 Michelin star	1 Michelin star
Opus 388	French	Shenzhen	—	—	—	—	—	1 Michelin star
Rêver 玥	French Contemporary	Haizhu	1 Michelin star	1 Michelin star	1 Michelin star	1 Michelin star	1 Michelin star	Closed
Song 宋	Sichuan	Tianhe	1 Michelin star	1 Michelin star	1 Michelin star	1 Michelin star	1 Michelin star	1 Michelin star
Stiller 斯蒂勒	European	Tianhe	—	1 Michelin star	1 Michelin star	1 Michelin star	1 Michelin star	1 Michelin star
Suyab Courtyard・Pickmoon Gourmet 岁集院子	Chaozhou	Panyu	1 Michelin star	1 Michelin star	1 Michelin star	1 Michelin star	1 Michelin star	1 Michelin star
Taian Table 泰安门	European	Garden Hotel, Guangzhou in Yuexiu	2 Michelin stars	2 Michelin stars	2 Michelin stars	2 Michelin stars	2 Michelin stars	2 Michelin stars
Wisca (Haizhu) 惠食佳(海珠店)	Cantonese	Haizhu	1 Michelin star	1 Michelin star	1 Michelin star	1 Michelin star	1 Michelin star	1 Michelin star
Xin Ji 信记海鲜饭店	Cantonese	Yuexiu	—	1 Michelin star	1 Michelin star	1 Michelin star	1 Michelin star	1 Michelin star
Xin Rong Ji	Taizhou	Shenzhen	—	—	—	—	—	1 Michelin star
Yong 兰亭永	Sichuan	Yuexiu	—	—	1 Michelin star	1 Michelin star	1 Michelin star	1 Michelin star
Yu Garden 屿	Min	Huangpu	—	—	—	1 Michelin star	1 Michelin star	1 Michelin star
Yu Yue Heen 愉粵軒	Cantonese	Four Seasons Guangzhou in Tianhe	1 Michelin star	1 Michelin star	1 Michelin star	1 Michelin star	1 Michelin star	1 Michelin star
Yun Jing	Cantonese	Shenzhen	—	—	—	—	—	2 Michelin stars
Reference								

=== 2018–2020 list ===
Key
1 Michelin star	One Michelin star
2 Michelin stars	Two Michelin stars
—	The restaurant did not receive a star that year

Michelin-starred restaurants
Name	Cuisine	Location	2018	2019	2020
Bing Sheng Mansion 炳勝公館	Cantonese	Tianhe	1 Michelin star	1 Michelin star	1 Michelin star
Bing Sheng Private Kitchen 炳勝私廚	Cantonese	Tianhe	1 Michelin star	1 Michelin star	1 Michelin star
Famous Cuisine 半島名軒	Cantonese	Tianhe	—	1 Michelin star	1 Michelin star
Imperial Treasure Fine Chinese Cuisine 御寶軒	Cantonese	Tianhe	—	1 Michelin star	2 Michelin stars
Jade River 玉堂春暖	Cantonese	White Swan Hotel in Liwan	1 Michelin star	1 Michelin star	1 Michelin star
Jiang By Chef Fei 江	Cantonese	Tianhe	1 Michelin star	2 Michelin stars	2 Michelin stars
Lai Heen 麗軒	Cantonese	Ritz Carlton Guangzhou in Tianhe	1 Michelin star	1 Michelin star	1 Michelin star
Lei Garden (Yuexiu) 利苑(越秀店)	Cantonese	Yuexiu	1 Michelin star	1 Michelin star	1 Michelin star
Lingnan House 廣御軒	Cantonese	Rosewood Guangzhou in Tianhe	—	—	1 Michelin star
Song 宋	Sichuan	Tianhe	—	1 Michelin star	1 Michelin star
Wisca (Haizhu) 惠食佳(海珠店)	Cantonese	Haizhu	1 Michelin star	1 Michelin star	1 Michelin star
Yu Yue Heen 愉粵軒	Cantonese	Four Seasons Guangzhou in Tianhe	1 Michelin star	1 Michelin star	1 Michelin star
Reference					

== See also ==
- List of Michelin-starred restaurants in Beijing
- List of Michelin-starred restaurants in Hong Kong and Macau
- List of Michelin-starred restaurants in Shanghai
- List of Michelin-starred restaurants in Taiwan
- Lists of Michelin-starred restaurants
