= Le Palais (restaurant) =

Cantonese restaurant in Taiwan

Le Palais is a fine-dining restaurant in Taipei, Taiwan, specializing in Cantonese cuisine. It is the first restaurant in Taiwan to have been awarded three Michelin stars.

== Location ==
Le Palais is located in the Palais de Chine Hotel, part of Taipei Main Station.

== History ==
Ken Chan became head chef of Le Palais in 2010.

In 2023 Le Palais collaborated with China Airlines on an in-flight catering menu.

== Awards and recognition ==
Le Palais was awarded three Michelin stars in 2018, the first year that Michelin awarded stars to restaurants in Taiwan, and has retained those stars as of 2025.

== See also ==
- Taïrroir
- List of Michelin-starred restaurants in Taiwan
- List of Michelin 3-star restaurants
