= RAW (restaurant) =

Restaurant in Taipei, Taiwan

RAW was a restaurant in Taipei, Taiwan owned by Chef André Chiang. It has two Michelin stars.

== History ==
In 2014, Chiang opened the restaurant RAW in Taipei, Taiwan.

In 2024 RAW did a two week pop-up restaurant in the Raffles Hotel, Singapore.

In 2024 Chiang announced that RAW would be closing and that he would be opening a cooking school in its place.

== Awards and recognition ==
From 2019 until 2024, RAW was awarded two Michelin stars.

== See also ==
- Restaurant André
- List of Michelin-starred restaurants in Taiwan
