= MINIMAL (restaurant) =

Ice cream parlor in Taichung, Taiwan

Minimal
- Interactive map of Minimal

Restaurant information
- Established: 2021
- Owner: Sur (restaurant)
- Head chef: Arvin Wan
- Food type: Ice cream and frozen desserts
- Rating: A Michelin star
- Location: No. 16, Lane 133, Section 1, Meicun Rd, West District, Taichung, Taiwan
- Coordinates: 24.151901692596883°N 120.66238281183809°E
- Seating capacity: Take out on first floor and 20 seats on second floor
- Website: surcuisine.com/minimal/

MINIMAL is a restaurant in Taichung, Taiwan, which focuses on ice cream and other frozen dishes; it is currently the only Michelin starred ice cream parlor in the world. The restaurant has an ice cream parlor to go on the first floor and a twenty-seat dining room on the second floor.

== History ==
MINIMAL was founded by Chef Arvin Wan. Wan is a native of Taichung who studied at the National Kaohsiung University of Hospitality and Tourism (NKUHT). Following time spent working at traditional restaurants and an ice cream parlor Wan opened a restaurant named Sur with his friend and fellow NKUHT graduate Lin Yi-hua where Wan managed the dessert side. In 2021, Wan opened MINIMAL although he continued to be active at Sur which was awarded a Michelin star in that year. According to CNN, "The name refers to the nominal number of elements in ice cream – from sugars to proteins – that create its smooth texture, as well as the aesthetic style."

== Menu ==
The typical tasting menu at MINIMAL is seven courses. The restaurant has struggled to make its tasting menu model profitable.

== Recognition ==
In 2023, MINIMAL received a Bib Gourmand recognition from Michelin.

In 2024, MINIMAL was awarded a Michelin star, making it the only ice cream parlor in the world to have one.

== See also ==
- List of Michelin-starred restaurants in Taiwan
