= Restaurant André =

Restaurant in Singapore

Coordinates: 1.2793979°N 103.8404849°E

- Interactive map of Restaurant André

Restaurant information
- Established: October 10, 2010; 15 years ago
- Closed: February 15, 2018; 8 years ago
- Owner: André Chiang
- Head chef: André Chiang
- Food type: French
- Rating: Michelin Guide 2016
- Location: 41 Bukit Pasoh Road, 089855, Singapore
- Seating capacity: 30
- Reservations: Yes
- Website: Restaurant André

Restaurant André was a fine-dining restaurant in Singapore that served French Nouvelle cuisine. The restaurant was opened on 10 October 2010 by André Chiang, who also served as the head chef. The restaurant had since closed on 15 February 2018.

== Accolades ==
Restaurant André has received numerous accolades in international publications. In 2011, the restaurant was featured in The New York Times’s list of Top 10 Restaurants in the World Worth a Plane Ride. In 2016, it was featured as one of the best restaurants in Singapore in The Daily Telegraph. In 2017, Chef Claude Bosi named the restaurant as one of the best fine dining restaurants in Singapore.

Restaurant magazine has named Restaurant André the best restaurant in Singapore and within the top ten in Asia in their annual list of the Top 50 Restaurants in Asia since the inaugural 2013 edition, until the restaurant's closure in 2018. The magazine named it the second-best restaurant in Asia in the 2017 rankings. The restaurant was also ranked at number 14 in the magazine's 2017 edition of The World's 50 Best Restaurants.

The restaurant received two stars in the Michelin Guide's inaugural 2016 Singapore edition.

== Closure ==
On 10 October 2017, Chiang announced that he will be closing Restaurant André with its last service on 14 February 2018. He will also be returning his Michelin stars and requested not to be included in the 2018 edition of the Michelin Guide Singapore. The restaurant closed on 15 February 2018.

In March 2018, Chef André Chiang announced he will be opening a new concept in place of Restaurant André, along with another restaurant in Taiwan.

== See also ==
- List of Michelin starred restaurants in Singapore
- List of restaurants in Singapore
