= List of Michelin-starred restaurants in Beijing =

As of the 2027 Michelin Guide, there are 34 restaurants in Beijing and Tianjin with a Michelin-star rating. The Michelin Guides have been published by the French tire company Michelin since 1900. They were designed as a guide to tell drivers about eateries they recommended to visit and to subtly sponsor their tires, by encouraging drivers to use their cars more and therefore need to replace the tires as they wore out. Over time, the stars that were given out became more valuable. While Michelin often partners with tourism boards or other financial partners for the creation of new guides, that was not the case with the Washington, D.C. guide; rather, it was an extension of existing US Michelin guides. Multiple anonymous Michelin inspectors visit the restaurants several times. They rate the restaurants on five criteria: "quality of products", "mastery of flavor and cooking techniques", "the personality of the chef represented in the dining experience", "value for money", and "consistency between inspectors' visits". Inspectors have at least ten years of expertise and create a list of popular restaurants supported by media reports, reviews, and diner popularity. If they reach a consensus, Michelin awards restaurants from one to three stars based on its evaluation methodology: one star means "high-quality cooking, worth a stop", two stars signify "excellent cooking, worth a detour", and three stars denote "exceptional cuisine, worth a special journey". The stars are not permanent and restaurants are constantly re-evaluated. If the criteria are not met, the restaurant will lose its stars. The 2020 edition was the first edition of the Michelin Guide for Beijing to be published. Beginning with the 2027 guide, the Tianjin region is now included as part of the Beijing ceremony.

== Lists ==
Key
1 Michelin star	One Michelin star
2 Michelin stars	Two Michelin stars
3 Michelin stars	Three Michelin stars
—	The restaurant did not receive a star that year
Closed	The restaurant is no longer open

Michelin-starred restaurants
Name	Cuisine	Location	2020	2021	2022	2023	2024	2025	2026	2027
Blackswan (黑天鹅法餐厅)	French Contemporary	Shunyi	—	—	—	—	—	1 Michelin star	2 Michelin stars	2 Michelin stars
Cai Yi Xuan (采逸軒)	Cantonese	Chaoyang	1 Michelin star	1 Michelin star	1 Michelin star	1 Michelin star	1 Michelin star	1 Michelin star	1 Michelin star	1 Michelin star
Chao Shang Chao (潮上潮)	Chaozhou	Chaoyang	—	—	2 Michelin stars	2 Michelin stars	3 Michelin stars	3 Michelin stars	3 Michelin stars	3 Michelin stars
Chao Shang Chao (Xicheng)	Chaozhou	Xicheng	—	—	—	—	—	—	1 Michelin star	1 Michelin star
Chef 1996 (1996川菜·主厨餐厅)	Sichuan	Chaoyang	—	—	—	—	—	—	—	1 Michelin star
China Banquet (Tingchao Huayan / 听潮华宴)	Huaiyang	Tianjin	—	—	—	—	—	—	—	1 Michelin star
Country Kitchen (乡味小厨) at Rosewood Beijing	Beijing cuisine	Dongcheng	—	1 Michelin star	1 Michelin star	1 Michelin star	—	—	—	—
Cui Hua Lou (萃華樓)	Shandong	Chaoyang	—	1 Michelin star	1 Michelin star	—	—	—	—	—
Da Dong (Gongti East Road) (大董（工體東路）)	Chinese Contemporary	Chaoyang	1 Michelin star	—	—	—	—	—	—	—
Da Dong (Dongsi 10th Alley) (大董（東四十條）)	Chinese Contemporary	Dongcheng	1 Michelin star	1 Michelin star	1 Michelin star	1 Michelin star	1 Michelin star	1 Michelin star	1 Michelin star	1 Michelin star
Family Li Imperial Cuisine (Xicheng) (厲家菜（西城）)		Xicheng	1 Michelin star	1 Michelin star	1 Michelin star	—	—	—	—	—
Forum	Cantonese	Dongcheng	—	—	—	1 Michelin star	1 Michelin star	1 Michelin star	—	—
Fu Chun Ju (富春居)	Cantonese	Dongcheng	1 Michelin star	1 Michelin star	1 Michelin star	1 Michelin star	1 Michelin star	1 Michelin star	1 Michelin star	1 Michelin star
Fu Rong (芙蓉无双)	Hunanese	Xicheng	—	—	1 Michelin star	1 Michelin star	1 Michelin star	1 Michelin star	1 Michelin star	1 Michelin star
GIADA Garden	Italian	Chaoyang	—	—	—	—	1 Michelin star	1 Michelin star	1 Michelin star	1 Michelin star
Huaiyang Fu (淮揚府)	Huaiyang	Dongcheng	1 Michelin star	1 Michelin star	1 Michelin star	1 Michelin star	1 Michelin star	1 Michelin star	—	—
Il Ristorante - Niko Romito	Italian	Chaoyang	1 Michelin star	1 Michelin star	1 Michelin star	1 Michelin star	1 Michelin star	1 Michelin star	1 Michelin star	1 Michelin star
In Love (Gongti East Road) (湘愛 (工體東路）)	Hunanese	Chaoyang	1 Michelin star	1 Michelin star	1 Michelin star	1 Michelin star	1 Michelin star	1 Michelin star	—	—
Jing Restaurant and Bar at Peninsula Beijing	French Contemporary	Dongcheng	—	1 Michelin star	1 Michelin star	1 Michelin star	1 Michelin star	1 Michelin star	1 Michelin star	—
Jing Yaa Tang (京雅堂)	French Contemporary	Chaoyang	1 Michelin star	1 Michelin star	1 Michelin star	1 Michelin star	1 Michelin star	Closed		
Jingji (京季)	Beijing cuisine	Chaoyang	—	2 Michelin stars	2 Michelin stars	2 Michelin stars	2 Michelin stars	2 Michelin stars	2 Michelin stars	2 Michelin stars
King's Joy (京兆尹)	Vegetarian	Dongcheng	2 Michelin stars	3 Michelin stars	3 Michelin stars	3 Michelin stars	3 Michelin stars	2 Michelin stars	2 Michelin stars	2 Michelin stars
Lamdre	Vegetarian	Chaoyang	—	—	—	—	1 Michelin star	1 Michelin star	2 Michelin stars	2 Michelin stars
Lao Ji Tang (老吉堂)	Shanghainese	Chaoyang	1 Michelin star	1 Michelin star	1 Michelin star	1 Michelin star	—	—	—	—
Lei Garden (Jinbao Tower) (利苑 （金寶大廈）)	Cantonese	Dongcheng	1 Michelin star	1 Michelin star	1 Michelin star	1 Michelin star	1 Michelin star	1 Michelin star	1 Michelin star	1 Michelin star
Ling Long (玲珑)	Innovative	Chaoyang	—	—	1 Michelin star	1 Michelin star	1 Michelin star	1 Michelin star	Closed	
Lu Shang Lu	Shandong	Chaoyang	—	—	—	1 Michelin star	1 Michelin star	2 Michelin stars	2 Michelin stars	2 Michelin stars
Lu Style (Anding Road) (鲁菜（安定路）)	Shandong	Chaoyang	—	—	1 Michelin star	1 Michelin star	1 Michelin star	1 Michelin star	1 Michelin star	1 Michelin star
Mansion Cuisine by Jingyan	Beijing cuisine	Dongcheng	—	—	—	1 Michelin star	1 Michelin star	1 Michelin star	1 Michelin star	1 Michelin star
Mio	Italian	Chaoyang	1 Michelin star	1 Michelin star	1 Michelin star	1 Michelin star	—	—	—	—
MO Jasmine	Beijing cuisine	Chaoyang	—	—	—	—	1 Michelin star	1 Michelin star	1 Michelin star	1 Michelin star
Old Tower (老塔)	Contemporary	Chaoyang	—	—	—	—	—	—	—	1 Michelin star
Opera BOMBANA	Italian	Chaoyang	—	—	1 Michelin star	1 Michelin star	1 Michelin star	—	—	—
Poetry. Wine (拾久(朝阳公园路))	Beijing cuisine	Chaoyang	—	1 Michelin star	—	—	—	—	—	—
Poetry. Wine (拾久(东三环中路)) (Dongsanhuan Middle Road)	Beijing cuisine	Chaoyang	1 Michelin star	1 Michelin star	1 Michelin star	1 Michelin star	1 Michelin star	1 Michelin star	1 Michelin star	1 Michelin star
Rong Pao	Yibin-style Sichuan	Chaoyang	—	—	—	—	—	—	1 Michelin star	1 Michelin star
Seventh Son (家全七福)	Cantonese	Chaoyang	1 Michelin star	1 Michelin star	1 Michelin star	1 Michelin star	—	—	1 Michelin star	1 Michelin star
Shanghai Cuisine (屋裡廂)	Shanghainese	Chaoyang	2 Michelin stars	—	2 Michelin stars	2 Michelin stars	2 Michelin stars	2 Michelin stars	2 Michelin stars	1 Michelin star
Sheng Yong Xing (Chaoyang) (晟久興 （朝陽）)	Beijing cuisine	Chaoyang	1 Michelin star	1 Michelin star	1 Michelin star	1 Michelin star	1 Michelin star	1 Michelin star	1 Michelin star	1 Michelin star
The Beijing Kitchen (北京廚房)	Cantonese	Chaoyang	1 Michelin star	1 Michelin star	1 Michelin star	1 Michelin star	1 Michelin star	1 Michelin star	1 Michelin star	1 Michelin star
The Georg	European Contemporary	Dongcheng	1 Michelin star	1 Michelin star	1 Michelin star	1 Michelin star	—	1 Michelin star	1 Michelin star	1 Michelin star
The House of Dynasties	Cantonese	Chaoyang	—	—	—	—	—	1 Michelin star	1 Michelin star	1 Michelin star
The Tasty House (承味堂)	Jiangzhe	Chaoyang	—	1 Michelin star	1 Michelin star	1 Michelin star	1 Michelin star	—	—	—
TRB Hutong	French Contemporary	Dongcheng	—	—	—	1 Michelin star	1 Michelin star	1 Michelin star	1 Michelin star	1 Michelin star
Vege Wonder (山河万朵)	Vegetarian	Dongcheng	—	1 Michelin star	1 Michelin star	1 Michelin star	—	—	—	—
Xin Rong Ji (Jiangguomenwai Street) (新榮記 （建國門外大街）)	Taizhou	Chaoyang	1 Michelin star	1 Michelin star	1 Michelin star	1 Michelin star	1 Michelin star	1 Michelin star	1 Michelin star	1 Michelin star
Xin Rong Ji (Jinrong Street) (新榮記 （金融大街）)	Taizhou	Xicheng	1 Michelin star	1 Michelin star	1 Michelin star	1 Michelin star	1 Michelin star	1 Michelin star	1 Michelin star	1 Michelin star
Xin Rong Ji (Xinyuan South Road) (新榮記 （新源南路）)	Taizhou	Chaoyang	3 Michelin stars	3 Michelin stars	3 Michelin stars	3 Michelin stars	3 Michelin stars	3 Michelin stars	3 Michelin stars	3 Michelin stars
Zhiguan Courtyard (止观小馆)	Dongbei	Dongcheng	—	1 Michelin star	1 Michelin star	1 Michelin star	1 Michelin star	1 Michelin star	1 Michelin star	1 Michelin star
Zijin Mansion (紫金阁)	Cantonese	Dongcheng	—	1 Michelin star	1 Michelin star	1 Michelin star	1 Michelin star	1 Michelin star	1 Michelin star	1 Michelin star
Reference										

== See also ==
- List of Michelin-starred restaurants in Chengdu
- List of Michelin-starred restaurants in Guangzhou
- List of Michelin-starred restaurants in Hangzhou
- List of Michelin-starred restaurants in Hong Kong and Macau
- List of Michelin-starred restaurants in Shanghai
- List of Michelin-starred restaurants in Taiwan
- Lists of Michelin-starred restaurants
