= Ice cream parlor =

Shop selling frozen desserts

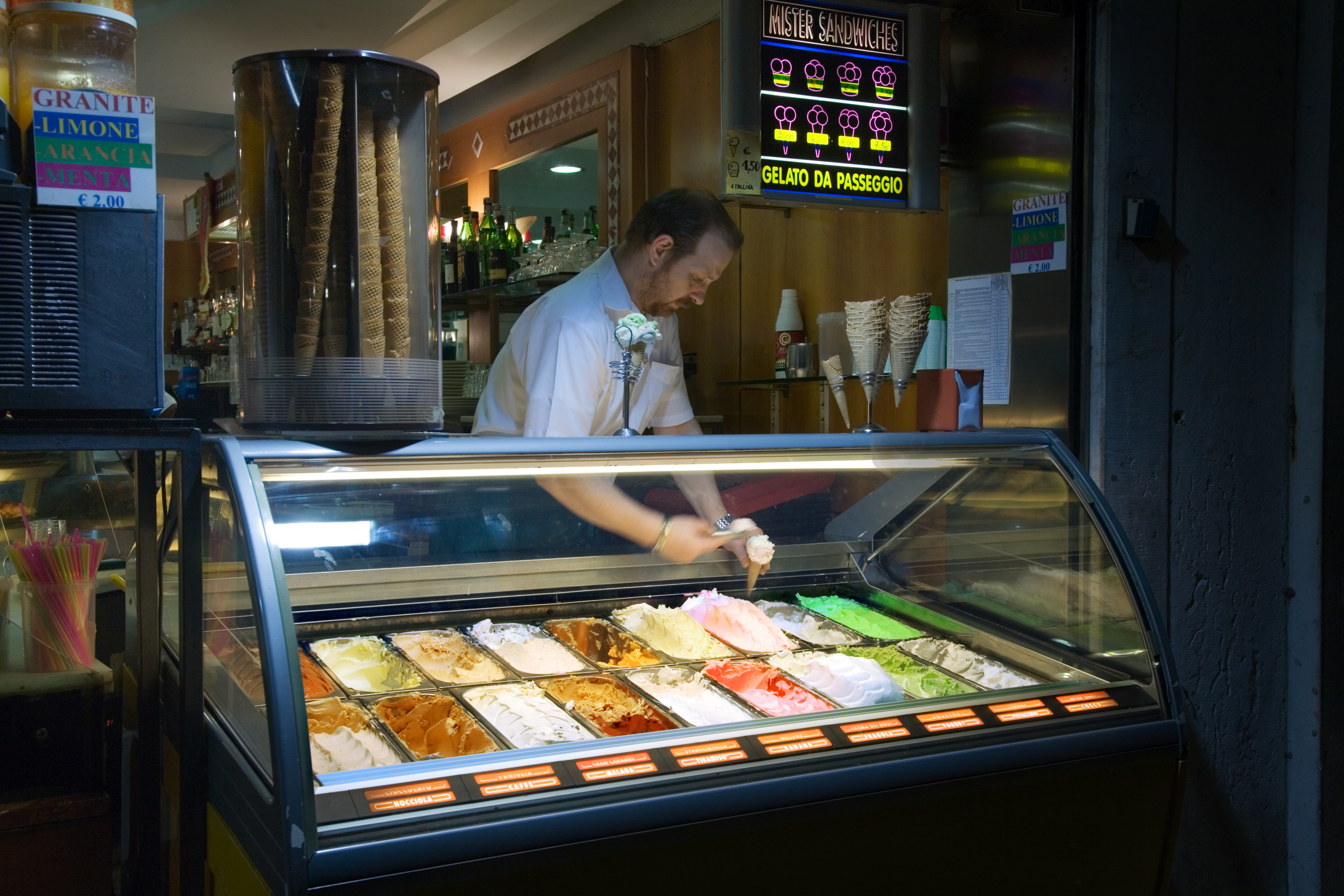
Gelato being served in a gelateria in Venice, Italy

Ice cream parlors (American English) or ice cream parlours (British English) are restaurants that sell ice cream, gelato, sorbet, and/or frozen yogurt to consumers. Ice cream is typically sold as regular ice cream (also called hard-packed or hard-serve ice cream), and/or soft serve, which is usually dispensed by a machine with a limited number of flavors (e.g., chocolate, vanilla, and "twist", or "zebra", a mix of the two). Ice cream parlors generally offer a number of flavors and items. Parlors often serve ice cream and other frozen desserts in cones, cups or dishes, the latter two to be eaten with a spoon. Some ice cream parlors prepare ice cream desserts such as sundaes (ice cream topped with syrup, whipped cream and other toppings) or milkshakes, or even a blend (known as a Boston shake).

== History ==
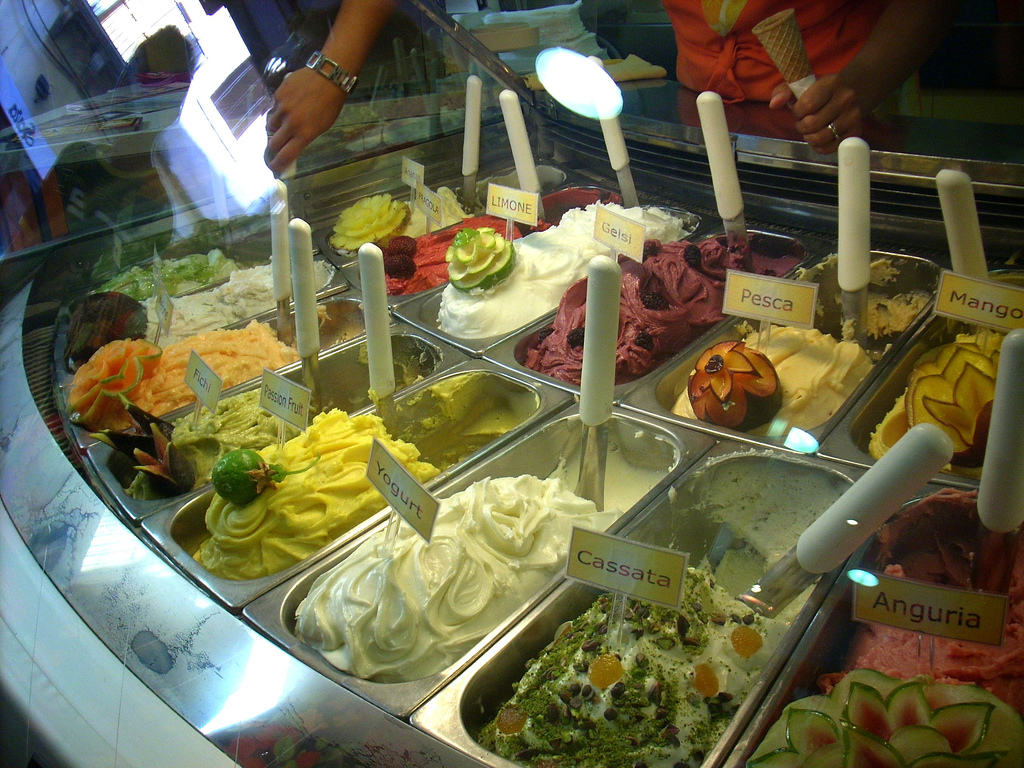
Gelato selections at a Sicilian gelateria

While the origins of ice cream are often debated, most scholars trace the first ice cream parlor back to France in the 17th century. In 1686, Francesco Procopio del Coltelli opened Paris' first café. The Café Procope, named by its Sicilian founder, introduced gelato to the French public. The dessert was served to its elite guests in small porcelain bowls.

According to one source, the first U.S. ice cream parlor opened in New York City in 1790. In the early 1800s, an early form of a U.S. ice cream parlor was existent in Philadelphia, Pennsylvania that sold "all kinds of refreshments, as Ice Cream, Syrups, French Cordials, Cakes, Clarets of the best kind, Jellies, etc."

The first ice cream factory in Pennsylvania in 1851, and industrial refrigeration in the 1870s made manufacturing and storing ice cream much simpler. The first ice cream factory was built by Jacob Fussell, a milk dealer who bought dairy products from Philadelphia farmers and sold them in Baltimore. The mass production of ice cream cut the product's cost significantly, making it more popular and more affordable for people of lower classes.

In the United States, ice cream trucks were used by ice cream parlors after World War II to reach customers after the development of urban sprawl.

In 2024 MINIMAL in Taiwan became the first ice cream parlor to win a Michelin star.

== Product overview ==
Gelato is a type of Italian ice cream with more milk and less cream than American ice cream. Sorbet is a frozen treat made from fruit, syrup and ice. No milk or cream is used. Frozen yogurt is a common low-fat ice cream alternative with a smooth texture that is similar to soft serve ice cream. All of these frozen products may be sold in ice cream cones, cups, sundaes, and milkshakes. Some parlors may also sell ice cream cakes, ice cream bars and other pre-packaged frozen sweets. In addition to frozen dessert products, some modern ice cream parlors also sell a variety of hot fast foods.

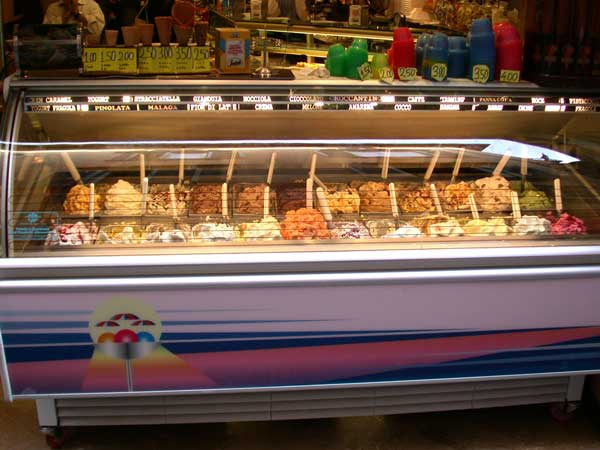
An Italian ice cream parlor with varieties of gelato (ice cream)

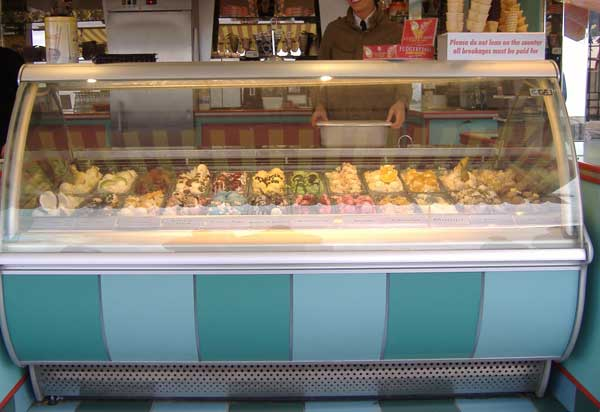
An English ice cream parlor with varieties of traditional ice cream

== Types ==
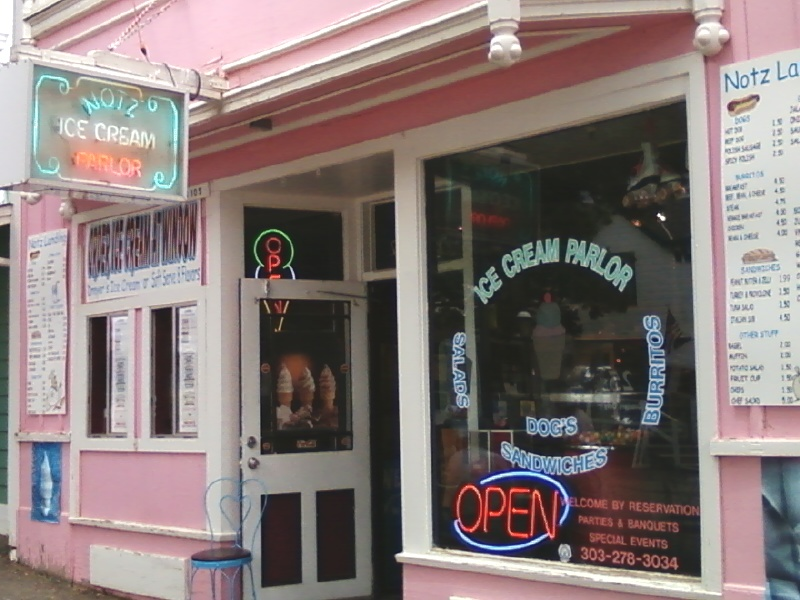
Entry to an ice cream parlor in the United States

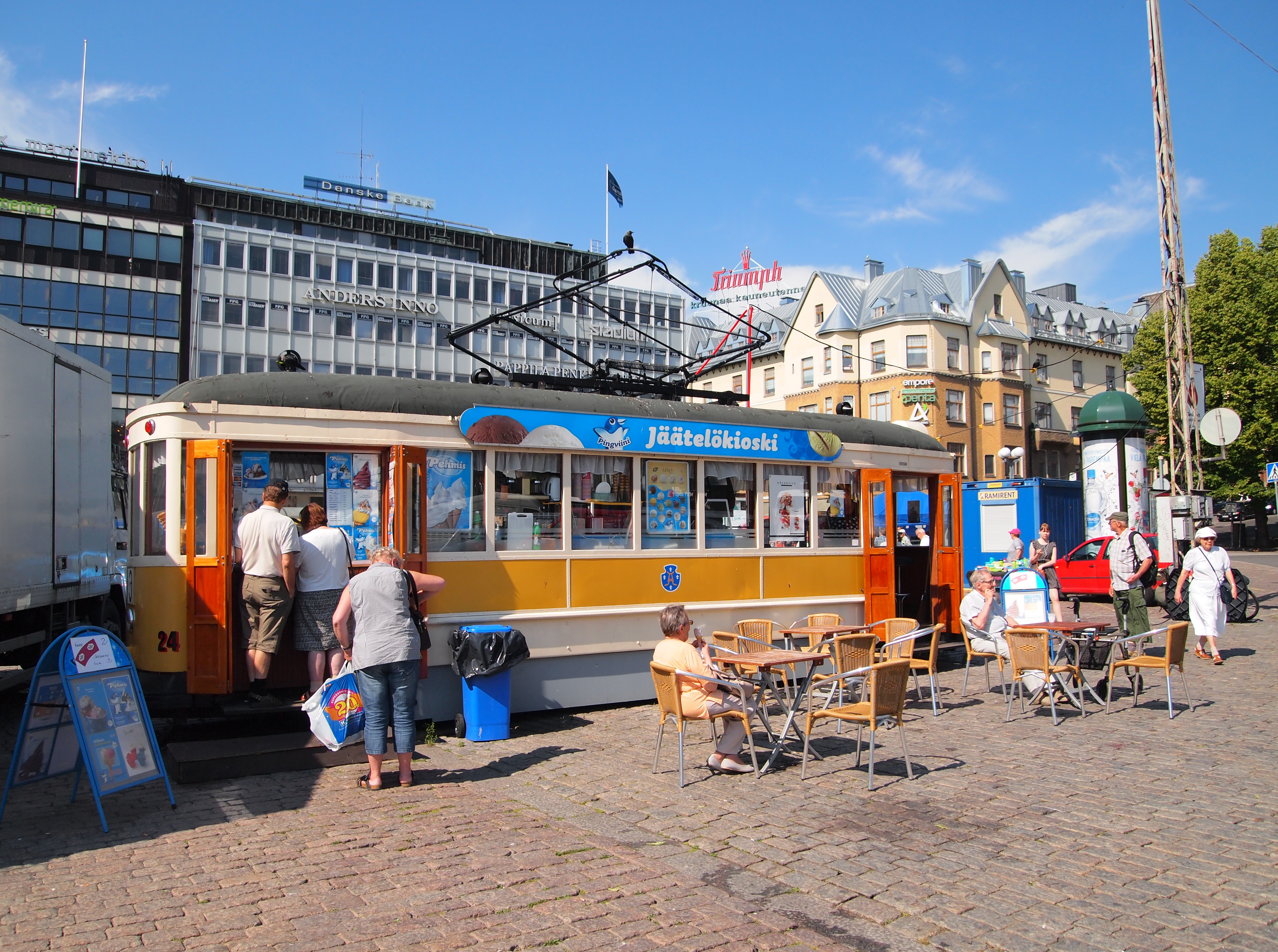
A tram-like ice cream kiosk at the Turku Market Square in Turku, Finland

Parlors vary in terms of size and environment. Some only have an order window and outside seating, while others have complete indoor facilities. Some parlors have drive-through windows. There are even parlors that combine several of these methods. Some parlors remain open all year round, typically in warmer weather locations and urban areas, and others in colder climates stay open only during warmer months, particularly from March to November. For example, some ice cream parlors in Vienna, Austria close in the winter months.

Some ice cream parlors in Moscow, Russia, offer alcoholic beverages along with ice cream.

== Ice cream parlor chains ==
Because ice cream parlors are located throughout the world, there are both small, local franchises as well as large, global enterprises. Some of the most notable large, global ice cream parlors include Baskin-Robbins, Ben & Jerry's, Bruster's Ice Cream, Carvel, Cold Stone Creamery, Dairy Queen, Dippin' Dots, Friendly's, and Häagen-Dazs. Yogurtland, Yogen Früz, and Sweet Frog are notable frozen yogurt parlors.

Just as the size, style, and selection within each ice cream parlor may differ, so may its popularity. Each July in the United States, in honor of National Ice Cream Month, several prominent publications rank the popularity of ice cream parlors throughout the United States. In 2014, Travel + Leisure, National Geographic, Business Insider, Food & Wine, and TripAdvisor published their top ranked ice cream parlors:

- Travel + Leisure: America's Best Ice Cream Shops
- National Geographic: Top 10 Places to Eat Ice Cream
- Business Insider: The 10 Best Ice Cream Shops In The US, According To Pinterest Users
- Food & Wine: Best Ice Cream Spots in the U.S.
- TripAdvisor: Best ice cream parlors in the US, ranked by TripAdvisor users

== See also ==
- Ice cream stand
- List of ice cream brands
- List of ice cream flavors
- List of frozen yogurt companies
- Milk bar
