= Taïrroir =

Taiwanese Michelin starred restaurant

- Interactive map of Taïrroir

Restaurant information
- Established: 2017; 9 years ago
- Head chef: Kai Ho
- Pastry chef: Angela Lai
- Food type: Taiwanese cuisine
- Dress code: Formal
- Rating: (Michelin Guide)
- Location: 6th Floor, No. 299 Lequn 3rd Road, Zhongshan District, Taipei City, 10462, Taiwan
- Coordinates: 25.0375°N 121.5272°E
- Reservations: Yes
- Website: tairroir.com

Taïrroir is a high-end restaurant in Taipei, Taiwan specializing in Taiwanese cuisine. In 2019 they became the first Taiwanese cuisine restaurant to receive three Michelin stars.

== History ==
As of 2021, Kai Ho was head chef and Angela Lai was the pastry chef. Ho trained in Singapore alongside Julien Royer in the Guy Savoy, this has been credited with giving Taïrroir's food a strong French influence.

In 2023 Taïrroir collaborated with Whey restaurant in Hong Kong.

== See also ==
- Le Palais (restaurant)
- List of Michelin-starred restaurants in Taiwan
- List of Michelin 3-star restaurants
