= André Chiang =

Taiwanese chef and restaurant owner

- Born: April 27, 1976 (age 50); Shilin District, Taipei, Taiwan
- Education: Tamsui Vocational High School
- Culinary career
- Cooking style: French, Sichuan (Chinese)
- Rating
- Michelin stars
- Current restaurants
- 1887 by André (Singapore); archi at The Archipelago (Toucheng, Taiwan); Burnt Ends (Singapore); The Bridge (Chengdu)
- Previous restaurants
- Bincho (Singapore); Jaan par André at Swissôtel The Stamford (Singapore); Porte 12 (Paris); RAW (Taipei); Restaurant André (Singapore); Sichuan Moon at Wynn Palace (Macau)

André Chiang (Chinese: 江振誠; pinyin: Jiāng Zhènchéng; born 27 April 1976) is a Taiwanese chef and owner of five restaurants. He is the former head chef of the three Michelin star restaurant Le Jardin des Sens in France. He is known for his "Octo-philosophy" of eight elements which make up his dishes. In 2017, his Michelin 2-star eponymous Restaurant André was named the Best Restaurant in Singapore, and the second-best in Asia by Restaurant magazine.

== Early life ==
André Chiang was born in Taiwan, but spent his early life in Japan where he learnt to cook from his mother. He initially expected to follow her into the family business and eventually take over but found that his imagination exceeded those bounds and wanted to learn the food of other cuisines. He specifically wanted to learn French cuisine because he felt that it was most unobtainable.

== Culinary career ==
Chiang moved to France, initially expecting to stay for a short period and return to Asia. Instead, he spent the next fifteen years living there having gained a position at the three Michelin star restaurant Le Jardin des Sens run by Jacques and Laurent Pourcel despite Chiang not speaking any French at the time. Over the course of the next nine years, Chiang worked his way up through the kitchen to the position of chef de cuisine. During his time in France, he also spent time in the kitchens of La Maison Troisgros, L'Atelier de Joël Robuchon and Restaurant Pierre Gagnaire.

After his time in France, Chiang took a position at the Maia Luxury Resort in the Seychelles, a move that he later credited with allowing him to discover his own style of cooking, a pursuit he felt had gotten lost during his work in French restaurants. It was during this time that he developed his "Octo-philosophy" of preparing dishes, which he describes as the eight elements of "pure, salt, artisan, south, texture, unique, memory and terroir". He described the meaning of pure as presenting the dish without seasoning, but allowing each item on the plate to naturally complement each other.

While the rest of his dishes have evolved over time, Chiang keeps one dish, entitled "Memory", the same as when he first created it in 1997. It is a warmed foie gras jelly served with a black truffle coulis. Chiang has called this a "pure André dish", having been the first dish he developed on his own. In 2008, he opened Jaan par André at the Swissôtel The Stamford in Singapore, and after 18 months at the restaurant it was placed at the 39th spot in the overall list of The World's 50 Best Restaurants. He closed the restaurant in 2010 to move out of the hotel and open Restaurant André in the Bukit Pasoh area of Singapore. At his self-titled restaurant, he and his team created a menu on a daily basis depending on the quality of produce available in the markets, crediting this for making both him and his team think about the courses and the techniques that they can use. Chiang announced the closure of Restaurant André in October 2017, and the restaurant ended service in February 2018.

In 2014, Chiang opened the restaurant RAW in Taipei, Taiwan.

== Awards ==
During his time at his restaurant Jaan par André, Chiang was named the Rising Chef of the Year for 2009 at the World Gourmet Summit Awards of Excellence. Restaurant André has placed in the top 10 in Restaurant magazine's list of the top 50 restaurants in Asia since 2013, and was named the best restaurant in Singapore and the second-best restaurant in Asia in 2017. His Taipei restaurant RAW was named the best restaurant in Taiwan and ranked number 24 in Asia in the same list.

== Popular culture ==
A documentary about Chiang, André & His Olive Tree by Singaporean filmmaker Josiah Ng, was released in August 2020.
