= White Swan Hotel =

Hotel in Guangzhou, Guangdong, China

- 白天鹅宾馆 or 白天鵝賓館
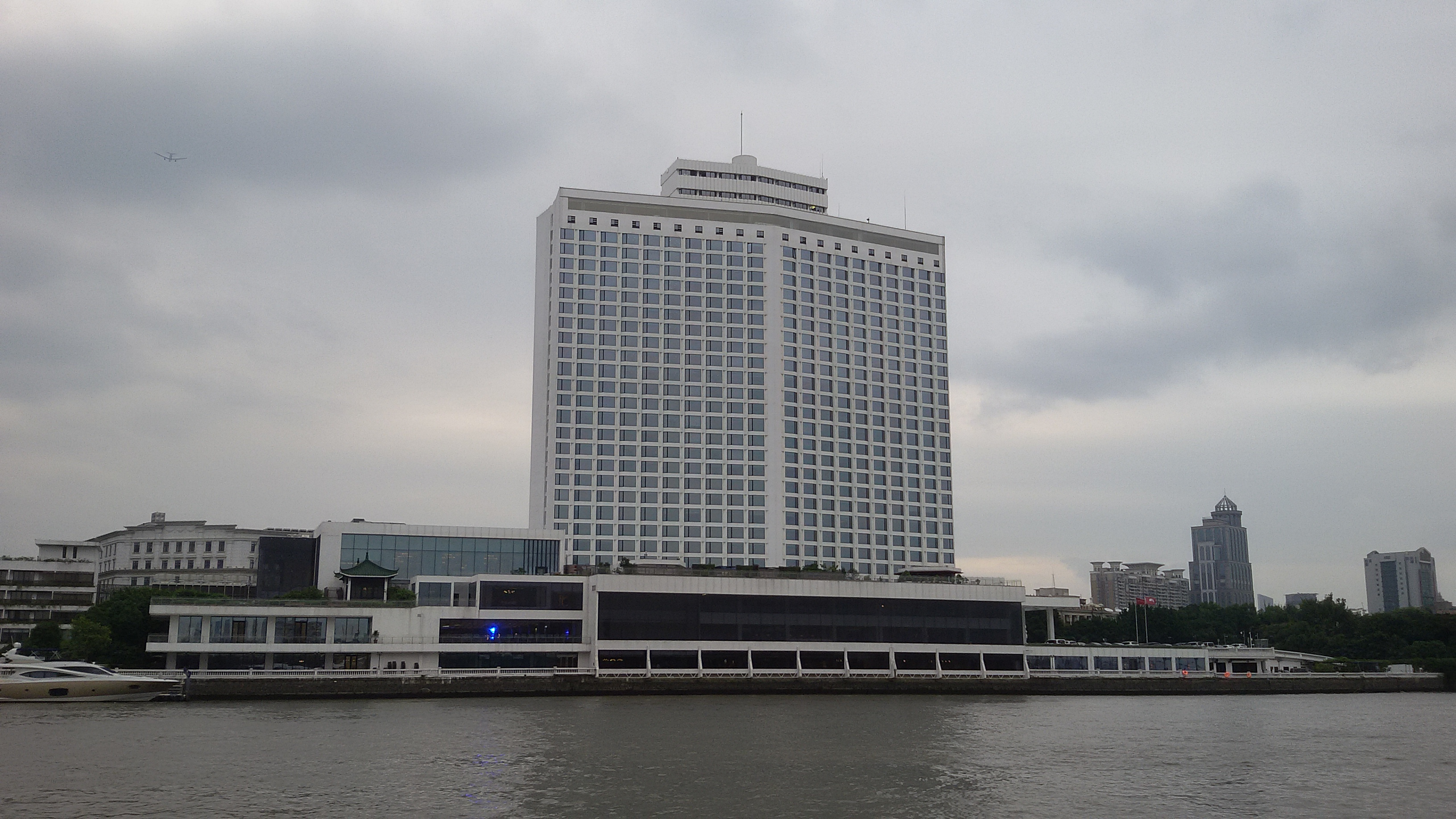
- Shamian Island, White Swan Hotel

- Location within Guangdong

General information
- Status: Completed
- Type: Skyscraper
- Classification: Hotel
- Location: Shamian Island, 1 Shamian South Street, Liwan District, Guangzhou, Guangdong, China
- Coordinates: 23°6′21.5″N 113°14′33.1″E
- Completed: 1983
- Opened: February 6, 1983
- Renovated: 2015

Height
- Architectural: 328.08 feet (100.00 m)
- Roof: 328.08 feet (100.00 m)

Technical details
- Floor count: 33

Other information
- Number of rooms: 520
- Number of restaurants: 5
- Number of bars: 2
- Facilities: Health club Outdoor pool Spa

Website
- www.whiteswanhotel.com/en

The White Swan Hotel (simplified Chinese: 白天鹅宾馆; traditional Chinese: 白天鵝賓館; pinyin: báitiān'é bīnguǎn; Jyutping: baak6 tin1 ngo4 ban1 gun2) is a 28-story luxury hotel in Guangzhou, Guangdong, China, located on Shamian Island, overlooking the Pearl River and facing the White Swan Pool. The hotel is reached by its own private 635 metres (2,083 ft) causeway.

== History ==
The hotel was built by Hong Kong businessman Fok Ying-tung and opened on February 6, 1983. Located near the old Thirteen Factories, the hotel is surrounded by Western-style buildings left behind from when Shamian Island hosted a British and French concession (1859-1946).

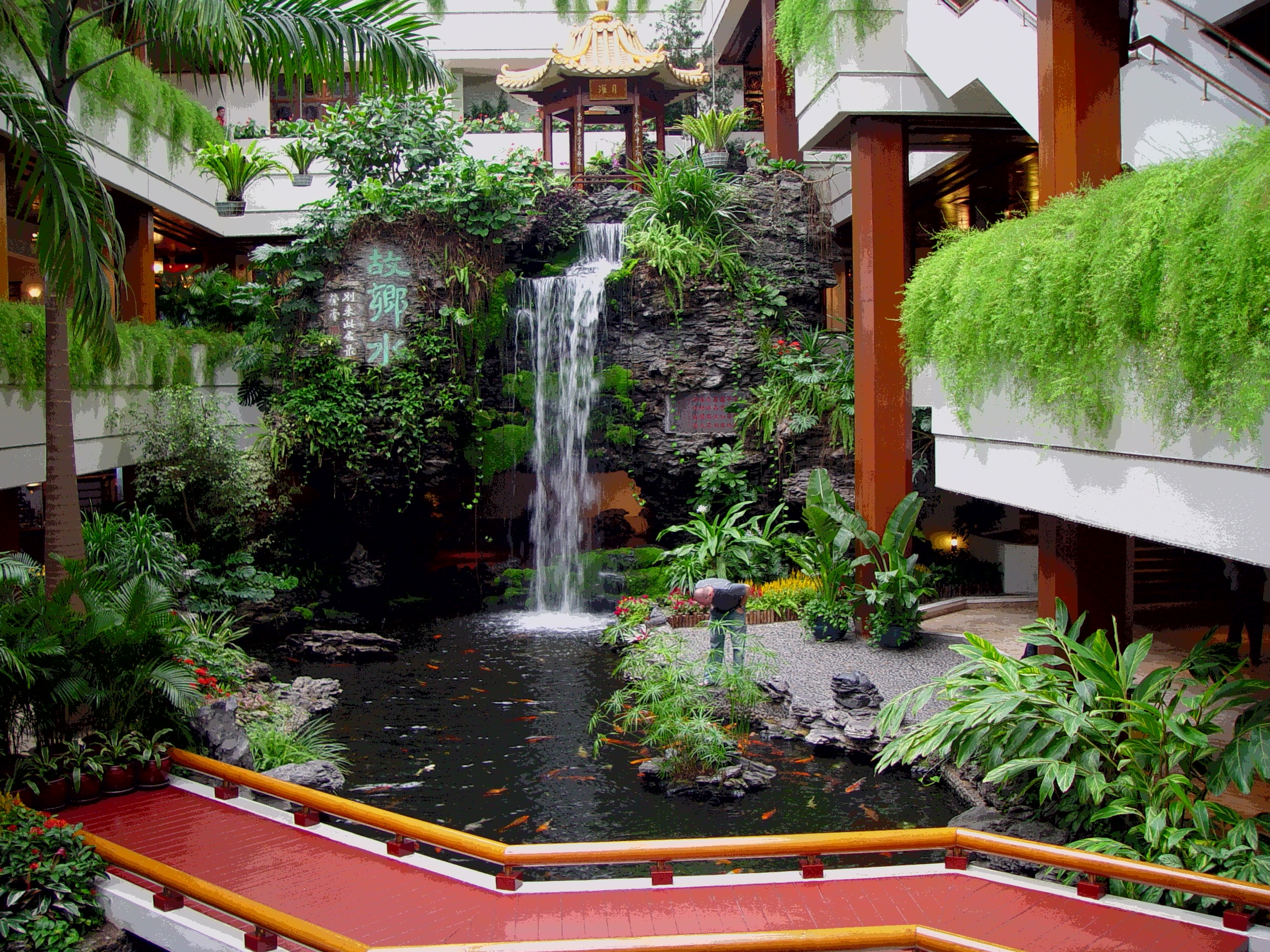
Inside the White Swan Hotel

In the early 2000s, after 20 years of private operations, the hotel was handed over to the Chinese government. The hotel now belongs to the Ministry of Land and Resources of the People's Republic of China.

The hotel closed down for renovations for three years and reopened on 15 July 2015.

== Description ==
The hotel has 520 rooms and suites. The White Swan's Jade River Restaurant, with its garden decor, is noted for its Cantonese cuisine, and has one Michelin star.

During the era of China's international adoption program (1992-2024), many American families seeking to adopt children from China would stay at the White Swan while in Guangzhou awaiting visa paperwork. The children's story book White Swan Express (2002) is based on this.

== Famous guests ==
Over the years, the White Swan Hotel has hosted numerous internationally renowned figures. Among its most notable guests are Queen Elizabeth II, Deng Xiaoping, Richard Nixon, Bill Gates, Fidel Castro, George H. W. Bush, Kim Jong-il, Margaret Thatcher, Lee Kuan Yew, Henry Kissinger, Zhao Ziyang, Hu Yaobang, Helmut Kohl, Norodom Sihanouk, King Carl XVI Gustaf, Yang Shangkun, Wang Zhen, and Ivan Arkhipov.

== Awards ==
- Member of "The Leading Hotels of the World" (1985)
- 5 stars by the Chinese Government in February 1990
- "China's 50 best hotels" in 1996
- "China's best well-known hotel" in 2008.
