= Bruster's Ice Cream =

American ice cream parlor chain

Bruster's Ice Cream, Inc.

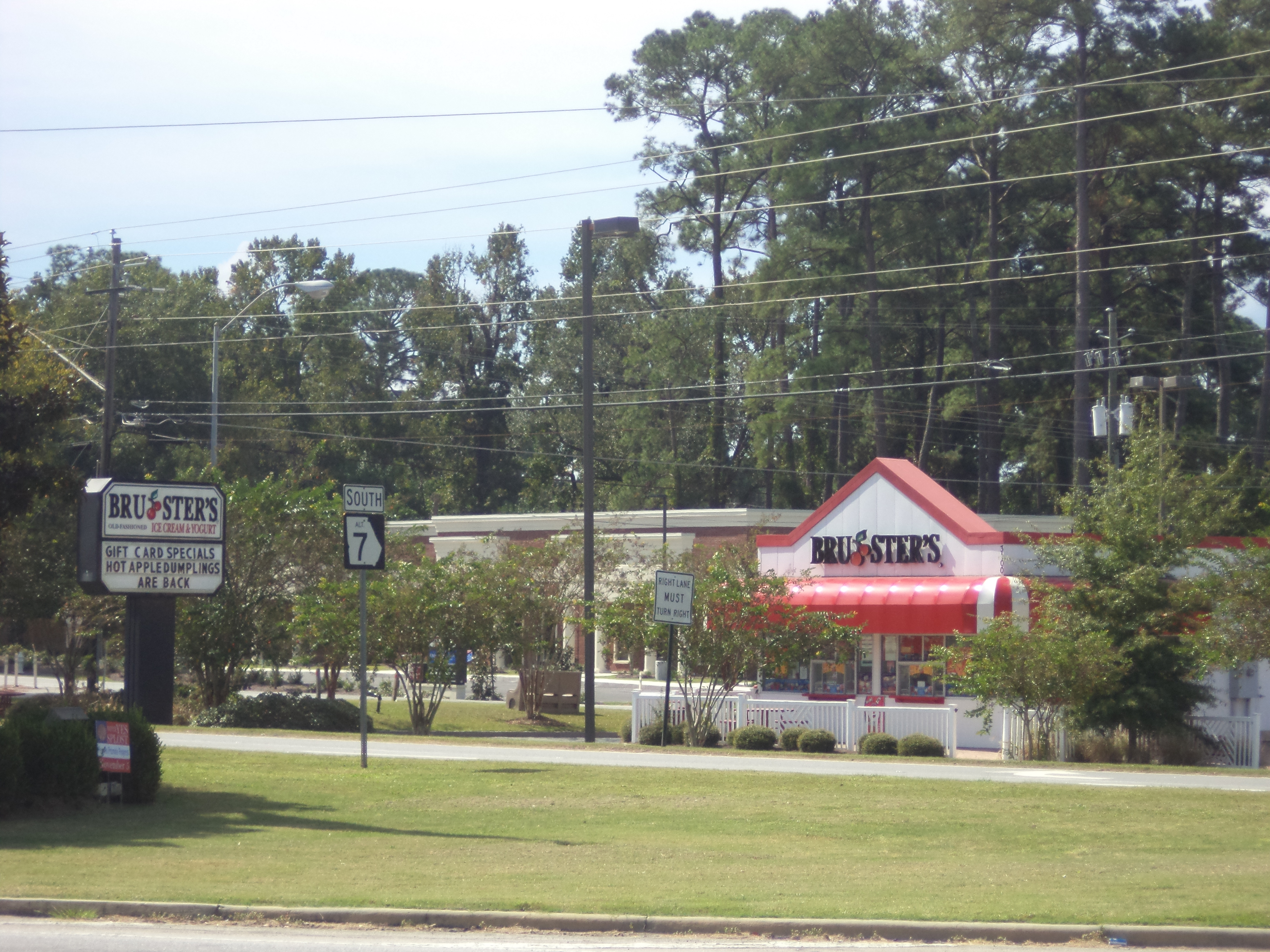
- Exterior of a Bruster's (now permanently closed) in Valdosta, Georgia, in 2015
- Trade name: Bruster's Real Ice Cream
- Company type: Private
- Industry: Restaurant Franchising
- Genre: Fast-food restaurant, ice cream parlor
- Founded: July 13, 1989; 36 years ago
- Founder: Bruce Reed
- Headquarters: Bridgewater, Pennsylvania, U.S.
- Number of locations: 214 (2024)
- Area served: United States (22 states); Guyana; South Korea
- Key people: Jim Sahene (CEO)
- Products: ice cream, milkshakes, sundaes, hot dogs, soft drinks, frozen custard, cakes, waffle cones
- Services: Catering; Franchising
- Revenue: ▲US$190.4 million (2024)
- Owner: Bruce Reed
- Number of employees: 2,300 (2024)
- Website: brusters.com

Bruster's Ice Cream, Inc., (Note: Pronounced /brustʌrs/ BREW-ster) also known as Bruster's Real Ice Cream or Bruster's, is an American chain of ice cream parlors based in Bridgewater, Pennsylvania. Their primary operating region is in most states east of the Mississippi River. The company's main products are ice cream and frozen yogurt. The ice cream is made on-site with a milk-based mix at each individual store in order to avoid ice crystal formation. There are 200 independently owned locations in 22 states, Guyana and South Korea.

== History ==
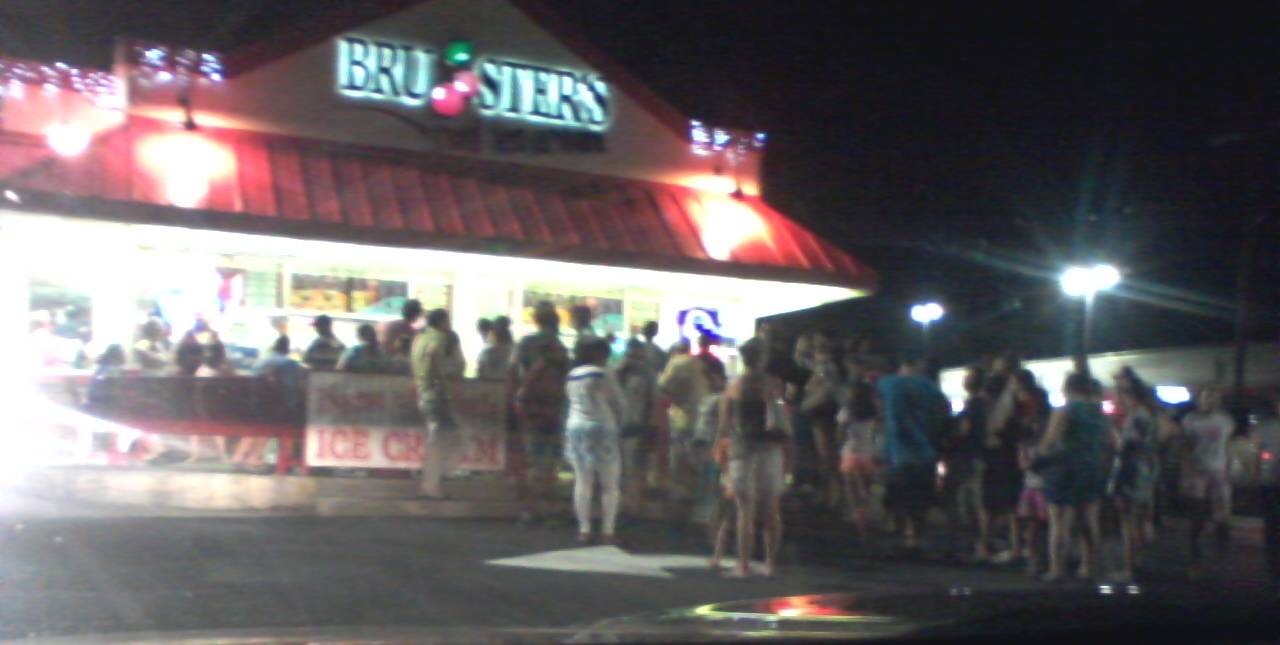
A Bruster's in Gaithersburg, Maryland

Founder Bruce Reed (born 1955) got his start with the ice cream business in the 1960s, when, as a child, he helped out his parents at their diner, Jerry's Curb Service, in Bridgewater, Pennsylvania, a small town located 27 miles northwest of Pittsburgh. It was through this experience that Reed would learn from his dad the secrets to the restaurant business.

In July 1989, Reed opened an ice-cream shop right next door to Jerry's, which was originally operated under a franchise from Handel's Homemade Ice Cream & Yogurt. In October 1990, Reed dropped the Handel's franchise and renamed the ice cream shop Bruster's.

Bruster's also began franchising and has outlets in Alabama, Arizona, California, Delaware, Florida, Georgia, Kentucky, Maryland, Massachusetts, Nevada, New Hampshire, New Jersey, New York, North Carolina, Ohio, Pennsylvania, South Carolina, Tennessee, Texas, Utah, Virginia, Guyana, and recently in South Korea as well. Bruster's remains headquartered in Bridgewater.

=== Co-branding ===
Some Bruster's locations also operate as franchisees of Nathan's Famous, with Nathan's hot dogs and other menu items sold in addition to ice cream.

== Products ==
Bruster's contains more than 150 ice cream flavors. They also make handmade ice cream cakes, homemade waffle cones, milkshakes, sundaes, and banana splits. Bruster's has recently introduced a limited range of non-dairy ice cream flavors made with oat milk for people with intolerance to lactose.
