= Justine Li =

Justine Li is a Taiwanese chef and restaurateur. In 2020 she was awarded a Michelin star for her restaurant Fleur De Sel, she was the first female chef in Taiwan to receive one.

== Early life and education ==
Li dropped out of school at 17 to work.

== Career ==
Li began working in a hotel at 17 and continued in the hospitality field from there. Li worked in Europe (United Kingdom, Italy, Spain, and France) for two decades before returning to Taiwan. Her impact on Taiwan's food scene has been significant, according to CommonWealth Magazine she is known as “Central Taiwan’s godmother of Western food.”

=== Fleur De Sel ===
Li founded Fleur De Sel in Taichung in 2004. The restaurant was impacted by the COVID-19 pandemic. However business improved due to Taiwan's better than average response to the virus with customers quickly returning to the restaurant. Following a renovation Fleur De Sel has a salt crystal inspired facade. The interior is luxurious and understated and the menu combines French technique and tradition with Taiwanese ingredients. In 2022 Fleur De Sel's Pauline Yu was awarded Michelin's Welcome and Service Award.
