= List of Michelin-starred restaurants in Hangzhou =

As of the 2026 Michelin Guide, there are 13 restaurants in Hangzhou with a Michelin-star rating. The Michelin Guides have been published by the French tire company Michelin since 1900. They were designed as a guide to tell drivers about eateries they recommended to visit and to subtly sponsor their tires, by encouraging drivers to use their cars more and therefore need to replace the tires as they wore out. Over time, the stars that were given out became more valuable.

Multiple anonymous Michelin inspectors visit the restaurants several times. They rate the restaurants on five criteria: "quality of products", "mastery of flavor and cooking techniques", "the personality of the chef represented in the dining experience", "value for money", and "consistency between inspectors' visits". Inspectors have at least ten years of expertise and create a list of popular restaurants supported by media reports, reviews, and diner popularity. If they reach a consensus, Michelin awards restaurants from one to three stars based on its evaluation methodology: one star means "high-quality cooking, worth a stop", two stars signify "excellent cooking, worth a detour", and three stars denote "exceptional cuisine, worth a special journey". The stars are not permanent and restaurants are constantly re-evaluated. If the criteria are not met, the restaurant will lose its stars. 2023 was the first year of the Michelin Guide for Hangzhou.

== Lists ==
Key
1 Michelin star	One Michelin star
2 Michelin stars	Two Michelin stars
—	The restaurant did not receive a star that year

Michelin-starred restaurants
Name	Cuisine	Location	2023	2024	2025	2026
Ambre Ciel (珀)	Innovative	Hangzhou	1 Michelin star	1 Michelin star	1 Michelin star	1 Michelin star
Guiyu (桂语山房)	Zhejiang	Hangzhou	1 Michelin star	1 Michelin star	1 Michelin star	1 Michelin star
Hangzhou House	Zhejiang	Hangzhou	—	—	1 Michelin star	1 Michelin star
Jie Xiang Lou (解香楼)	Zhejiang	Hangzhou	1 Michelin star	1 Michelin star	1 Michelin star	2 Michelin stars
Jin Sha (金沙厅)	Zhejiang	Hangzhou	1 Michelin star	1 Michelin star	1 Michelin star	1 Michelin star
L'éclat 19	French	Hangzhou	—	—	1 Michelin star	1 Michelin star
Longjing Manor (龙井草堂)	Zhejiang	Hangzhou	1 Michelin star	1 Michelin star	1 Michelin star	1 Michelin star
Ru Yuan (如院)	Zhejiang	Hangzhou	—	1 Michelin star	2 Michelin stars	2 Michelin stars
Sense	Innovative	Hangzhou	—	—	1 Michelin star	1 Michelin star
Song	Ningbo	Hangzhou	—	—	1 Michelin star	1 Michelin star
Wild Yeast (暗香)	Chinese	Hangzhou	—	1 Michelin star	1 Michelin star	1 Michelin star
Xin Rong Ji (新荣记)	Taizhou	Hangzhou	1 Michelin star	.	1 Michelin star	1 Michelin star
Yu Zhi Lan	Sichuan	Hangzhou	—	—	1 Michelin star	1 Michelin star
Reference						

== See also ==
- List of Michelin-starred restaurants in Beijing
- List of Michelin-starred restaurants in Hong Kong and Macau
- List of Michelin-starred restaurants in Shanghai
- List of Michelin-starred restaurants in Taiwan
- Lists of Michelin-starred restaurants
