= List of Michelin-starred restaurants in Taiwan =

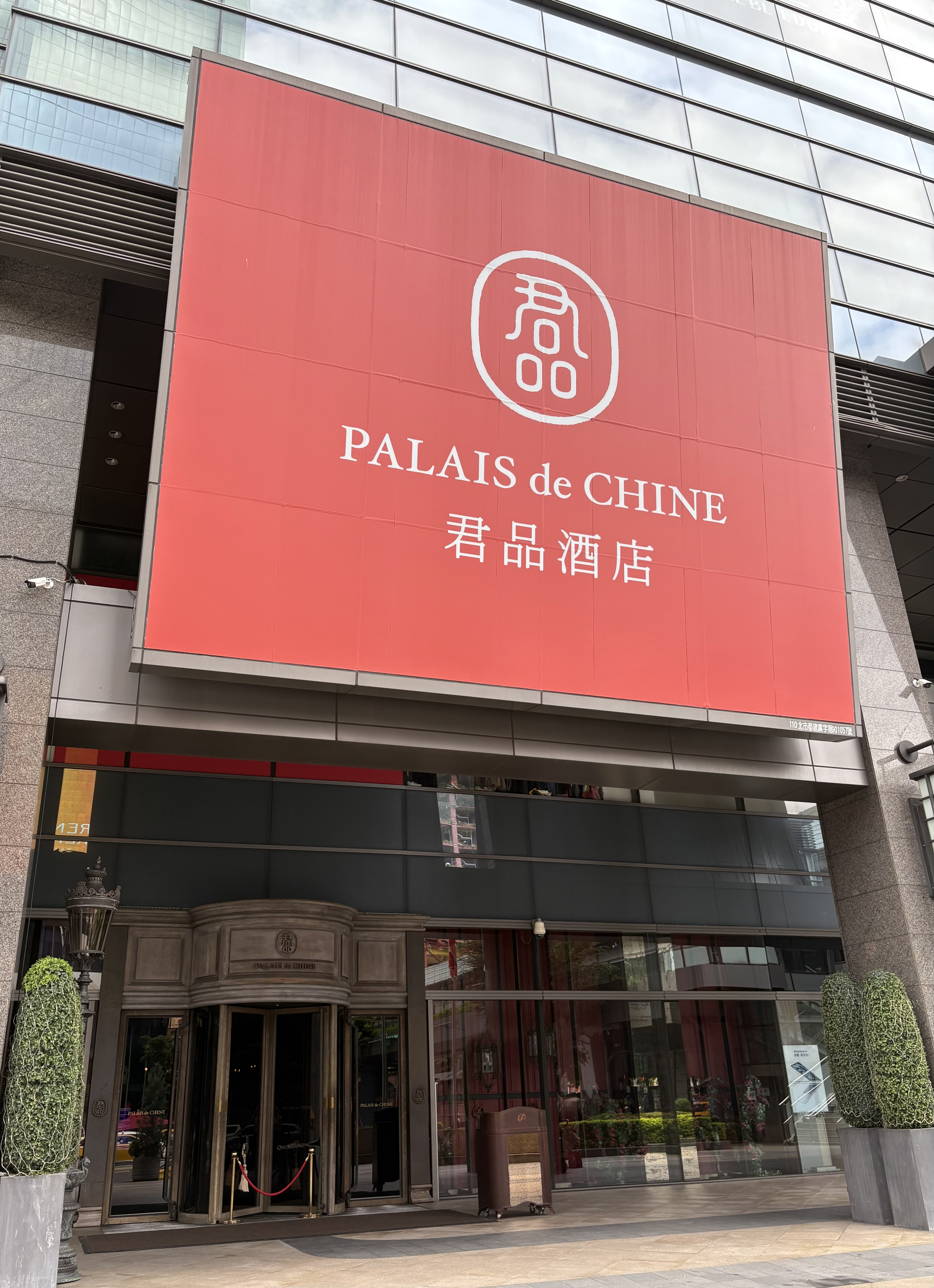
Le Palais, a 3 Michelin-starred restaurant in Taipei

In the 2026 Michelin Guide, there are 61 restaurants in Taiwan with a Michelin-star rating.

The Michelin Guides have been published by the French tire company Michelin since 1900. They were designed as a guide to tell drivers about which eateries they should to visit and to subtly sponsor their tires. This was done by encouraging drivers to use their cars more and therefore need to replace the tires as they wore out. Over time Michelin stars became more valuable.

Before a star is given, multiple anonymous Michelin inspectors visit the restaurants several times. They rate the restaurants on five criteria: "quality of products", "mastery of flavor and cooking techniques", "the personality of the chef represented in the dining experience", "harmony of flavor", and "consistency between inspectors' visits". Inspectors have at least ten years of expertise and create a list of popular restaurants supported by media reports, reviews, and diner popularity, for them to inspect. If the Michelin inspectors who have eaten at the restaurant reach a consensus, Michelin awards the restaurant from one to three stars. One star means "high-quality cooking, worth a stop", two stars signify "excellent cooking, worth a detour", and three stars denote "exceptional cuisine, worth a special journey". The stars are not permanent and restaurants are re-evaluated every year. If the criteria are not met, the restaurant will lose its stars.

The 2018 edition was the inaugural edition of the Michelin Guide for Taipei, Taiwan. Taipei was the eighth Asian city or region to have a dedicated Michelin Guide, after Tokyo, Hong Kong and Macau, Osaka and Kyoto, Singapore, Shanghai, Seoul, and Bangkok. Michelin began reviewing restaurants in Taichung in 2020, with Tainan and Kaohsiung being added in 2022. Michelin announced it would further expand its coverage area in Taiwan for the 2025 guide, to also rate restaurants in New Taipei City, Hsinchu County, and Hsinchu City.

== Lists ==
Key
1 Michelin star	One Michelin star
2 Michelin stars	Two Michelin stars
3 Michelin stars	Three Michelin stars
—	The restaurant did not receive a star that year
Closed	The restaurant is no longer open

Michelin-starred restaurants
Name	Cuisine	Location	2018	2019	2020	2021	2022	2023	2024	2025	2026
12	Modern	Taipei	—	—	—	—	—	—	—	—	1 Michelin star
A	French	Taipei – Da'an	—	—	—	—	—	—	1 Michelin star	2 Michelin stars	2 Michelin stars
A Cut	Steakhouse	Taipei – Zhongshan	—	—	1 Michelin star	1 Michelin star	—	1 Michelin star	1 Michelin star	1 Michelin star	1 Michelin star
Ad Astra	Contemporary	Taipei – Zhongshan	—	—	—	—	—	1 Michelin star	1 Michelin star	1 Michelin star	1 Michelin star
aMaze (心宴)	Creative	Taipei – Zhongshan	—	—	—	—	—	—	—	1 Michelin star	1 Michelin star
Ban Bo (斑泊)	Taiwanese	Taipei – Zhongshan	—	—	—	—	—	1 Michelin star	1 Michelin star	1 Michelin star	1 Michelin star
Chuan Ya (川雅)	Sichuan	Taipei – Xinyi	—	—	—	—	—	—	—	1 Michelin star	1 Michelin star
Circum-	Creative	Taipei – Zhongshan	—	—	—	—	—	—	1 Michelin star	1 Michelin star	1 Michelin star
Danny's Steakhouse (教父牛排)	Steakhouse	Taipei – Zhongshan	1 Michelin star	1 Michelin star	1 Michelin star	1 Michelin star	1 Michelin star	1 Michelin star	—	—	—
Da-Wan (大腕)	Barbecue	Taipei – Da'an	1 Michelin star	1 Michelin star	1 Michelin star	1 Michelin star	—	—	—	—	—
De Nuit	French	Taipei – Da'an	—	—	—	1 Michelin star	1 Michelin star	1 Michelin star	1 Michelin star	1 Michelin star	1 Michelin star
Eika (盈科)	Japanese	Taipei – Datong	—	—	—	—	—	—	1 Michelin star	2 Michelin stars	2 Michelin stars
Fleur de Sel	French	Taichung – Xitun	—	—	1 Michelin star	1 Michelin star	1 Michelin star	1 Michelin star	1 Michelin star	1 Michelin star	—
Forchetta	European	Taichung – Xitun	—	—	1 Michelin star	1 Michelin star	1 Michelin star	1 Michelin star	1 Michelin star	—	—
FRASSI	Italian	Taipei – Zhongshan	—	—	—	—	—	—	—	1 Michelin star	1 Michelin star
Fujin Tree (Songshan)	Taiwanese	Taipei – Songshan	—	—	—	1 Michelin star	1 Michelin star	1 Michelin star	1 Michelin star	1 Michelin star	1 Michelin star
Gen	Cantonese	Kaohsiung – Cianjhen	—	—	—	—	—	—	1 Michelin star	1 Michelin star	1 Michelin star
Golden Formosa (金蓬萊遵古台菜)	Taiwanese	Taipei – Shilin	1 Michelin star	1 Michelin star	1 Michelin star	1 Michelin star	1 Michelin star	1 Michelin star	1 Michelin star	1 Michelin star	1 Michelin star
Habu	Creative	Kaohsiung	—	—	—	—	—	—	—	—	1 Michelin star
HAILI	Modern	Kaohsiung – Cianjin	—	—	—	—	—	1 Michelin star	1 Michelin star	1 Michelin star	1 Michelin star
Holt	Contemporary	Taipei – Songshan	—	—	—	—	1 Michelin star	1 Michelin star	Closed		
Hosu (好嶼)	Taiwanese	Taipei – Da'an	—	—	—	—	—	—	—	1 Michelin star	1 Michelin star
Impromptu by Paul Lee	Innovative	Taipei – Zhongshan	—	1 Michelin star	1 Michelin star	1 Michelin star	1 Michelin star	1 Michelin star	1 Michelin star	1 Michelin star	1 Michelin star
INITA	Italian	Taipei – Songshan	—	—	—	—	—	1 Michelin star	1 Michelin star	1 Michelin star	1 Michelin star
JL Studio	Singaporean	Taichung – Nantun	—	—	2 Michelin stars	2 Michelin stars	2 Michelin stars	3 Michelin stars	3 Michelin stars	3 Michelin stars	3 Michelin stars
Ken Anhe (謙安和)	Japanese	Taipei – Da'an	1 Michelin star	1 Michelin star	1 Michelin star	1 Michelin star	1 Michelin star	1 Michelin star	1 Michelin star	1 Michelin star	1 Michelin star
Kiku	Japanese	Taipei	—	—	—	—	—	—	—	—	1 Michelin star
Kitcho (吉兆割烹壽司)	Japanese	Taipei – Da'an	1 Michelin star	1 Michelin star	1 Michelin star	1 Michelin star	1 Michelin star	1 Michelin star	1 Michelin star	1 Michelin star	1 Michelin star
L'Atelier de Joël Robuchon	French	Taipei – Xinyi	1 Michelin star	1 Michelin star	1 Michelin star	2 Michelin stars	2 Michelin stars	2 Michelin stars	2 Michelin stars	2 Michelin stars	2 Michelin stars
L'Atelier par Yao	French	Taichung – Taiping	—	—	—	—	—	—	1 Michelin star	1 Michelin star	1 Michelin star
La Cocotte by Fabien Vergé	French	Taipei – Da'an	1 Michelin star	Closed							
La Maison de Win (文公館)	Taiwanese	Taichung – Xitun	—	—	—	—	—	1 Michelin star	1 Michelin star	Closed	
La Vie by Thomas Bühner	European	Taipei – Zhongshan	—	—	—	—	—	—	—	1 Michelin star	1 Michelin star
Le Palais	Cantonese	Taipei – Datong	3 Michelin stars	3 Michelin stars	3 Michelin stars	3 Michelin stars	3 Michelin stars	3 Michelin stars	3 Michelin stars	3 Michelin stars	3 Michelin stars
Liberté	Modern	Kaohsiung – Cianjhen	—	—	—	—	1 Michelin star	2 Michelin stars	Closed		
logy	Japanese / Taiwanese	Taipei – Da'an	—	1 Michelin star	2 Michelin stars	2 Michelin stars	2 Michelin stars	2 Michelin stars	2 Michelin stars	2 Michelin stars	2 Michelin stars
Longtail	Innovative	Taipei – Da'an	1 Michelin star	1 Michelin star	1 Michelin star	1 Michelin star	1 Michelin star	1 Michelin star	—	—	Closed
Ming Fu (明福台菜海產)	Taiwanese	Taipei – Zhongshan	1 Michelin star	1 Michelin star	1 Michelin star	1 Michelin star	1 Michelin star	1 Michelin star	1 Michelin star	1 Michelin star	1 Michelin star
MINIMAL	Ice cream	Taichung – West	—	—	—	—	—	—	1 Michelin star	—	—
Mipon (米香)	Taiwanese	Taipei – Zhongshan	—	—	—	1 Michelin star	1 Michelin star	1 Michelin star	1 Michelin star	1 Michelin star	1 Michelin star
Mizue	Japanese	Taipei	—	—	—	—	—	—	—	—	2 Michelin stars
Molino de Urdániz (渥達尼斯磨坊)	Spanish	Taipei – Zhongshan	—	—	1 Michelin star	1 Michelin star	1 Michelin star	2 Michelin stars	2 Michelin stars	2 Michelin stars	2 Michelin stars
Motoichi (元一)	Japanese	Taipei – Da'an	—	—	—	—	—	—	—	1 Michelin star	1 Michelin star
Mountain and Sea House	Taiwanese	Taipei – Zhongzhen	—	1 Michelin star	1 Michelin star	1 Michelin star	1 Michelin star	1 Michelin star	1 Michelin star	1 Michelin star	1 Michelin star
Mudan	Tempura	Taipei – Da'an	—	—	—	1 Michelin star	1 Michelin star	2 Michelin stars	2 Michelin stars	2 Michelin stars	2 Michelin stars
MUME	Contemporary	Taipei – Da'an	1 Michelin star	1 Michelin star	1 Michelin star	—	—	—	—	—	1 Michelin star
Nibbon	French	Kaohsiung	—	—	—	—	—	—	—	—	1 Michelin star
NOBUO	Contemporary	Taipei – Zhongzhen	—	—	—	—	—	—	1 Michelin star	1 Michelin star	2 Michelin stars
Oretachi No Nikuya	Barbecue	Taichung – West	—	—	1 Michelin star	1 Michelin star	1 Michelin star	1 Michelin star	1 Michelin star	1 Michelin star	1 Michelin star
Paris 1930 de Hideki Takayama	French	Taipei – Zhongshan	—	—	—	—	1 Michelin star	1 Michelin star	1 Michelin star	1 Michelin star	—
RAW	Innovative	Taipei – Zhongshan	1 Michelin star	2 Michelin stars	2 Michelin stars	2 Michelin stars	2 Michelin stars	2 Michelin stars	2 Michelin stars	Closed	
Sens	French	Taipei – Songshan	—	—	—	—	—	—	1 Michelin star	1 Michelin star	1 Michelin star
Shin Yeh Taiwanese Signature	Taiwanese	Taipei – Zhongshan	—	—	—	—	1 Michelin star	1 Michelin star	1 Michelin star	1 Michelin star	1 Michelin star
Shineyu	Cantonese	Taichung	—	—	—	—	—	—	—	—	1 Michelin star
Shoun Ryugin (祥雲龍吟)	Japanese	Taipei – Zhongshan	2 Michelin stars	2 Michelin stars	2 Michelin stars	2 Michelin stars	2 Michelin stars	Closed			
Sho (承)	Japanese	Kaohsiung – Cianjhen	—	—	—	—	1 Michelin star	1 Michelin star	1 Michelin star	1 Michelin star	1 Michelin star
Silks House	Cantonese	Taipei	—	—	—	—	—	—	—	—	1 Michelin star
Sur- (澀)	Taiwanese	Taichung – Central	—	—	—	1 Michelin star	1 Michelin star	1 Michelin star	1 Michelin star	1 Michelin star	1 Michelin star
Sushi Akira (明壽司)	Japanese	Taipei – Zhongshan	—	—	1 Michelin star	1 Michelin star	1 Michelin star	1 Michelin star	1 Michelin star	1 Michelin star	1 Michelin star
Sushi Amamoto (鮨天本)	Japanese	Taipei – Da'an	—	2 Michelin stars	2 Michelin stars	2 Michelin stars	—	—	—	—	—
Sushi An	Japanese	Hsinchu County	—	—	—	—	—	—	—	—	1 Michelin star
Sushi Kajin (鮨 嘉仁)	Sushi	Taipei – Zhongshan	—	—	—	—	—	—	—	1 Michelin star	1 Michelin star
Sushi Nomura (鮨野村)	Japanese	Taipei – Da'an	1 Michelin star	1 Michelin star	1 Michelin star	1 Michelin star	1 Michelin star	1 Michelin star	—	—	—
Sushi Ryu (鮨隆)	Japanese	Taipei – Zhongshan	1 Michelin star	1 Michelin star	1 Michelin star	1 Michelin star	1 Michelin star	1 Michelin star	1 Michelin star	1 Michelin star	1 Michelin star
Sushiyoshi (壽司芳)	Japanese	Taipei – Da'an	—	—	—	—	1 Michelin star	1 Michelin star	1 Michelin star	1 Michelin star	1 Michelin star
Tainan Tan Tsu Mien Seafood	Seafood	Taipei – Wanhua	—	1 Michelin star	—	—	—	—	—	—	—
T+T	Asian	Taipei – Songshan	—	—	—	1 Michelin star	1 Michelin star	1 Michelin star	1 Michelin star	1 Michelin star	1 Michelin star
Taïrroir	Taiwanese	Taipei – Zhongshan	1 Michelin star	2 Michelin stars	2 Michelin stars	2 Michelin stars	2 Michelin stars	3 Michelin stars	3 Michelin stars	3 Michelin stars	3 Michelin stars
The Front House	Innovative	Kaohsiung – Lingya	—	—	—	—	—	—	—	1 Michelin star	1 Michelin star
The Guest House (請客樓)	Huaying	Taipei – Zhongshan	2 Michelin stars	2 Michelin stars	2 Michelin stars	2 Michelin stars	2 Michelin stars	1 Michelin star	1 Michelin star	1 Michelin star	1 Michelin star
Three Coins (大三元)	Cantonese	Taipei – Zhongshan	1 Michelin star	1 Michelin star	1 Michelin star	—	—	—	—	—	—
Tien Hsiang Lo	Hangzhou	Taipei – Zhongshan	1 Michelin star	1 Michelin star	1 Michelin star	1 Michelin star	1 Michelin star	1 Michelin star	1 Michelin star	1 Michelin star	1 Michelin star
Wok by O'BOND	Creative	Taipei – Zhongshan	—	—	—	—	—	—	1 Michelin star	1 Michelin star	1 Michelin star
Ya Ge (雅閣)	Cantonese	Taipei – Songshan	1 Michelin star	1 Michelin star	1 Michelin star	1 Michelin star	1 Michelin star	1 Michelin star	1 Michelin star	1 Michelin star	1 Michelin star
Yu Dao	Taiwanese	Tainan	—	—	—	—	—	—	—	—	1 Michelin star
Yu Kapo	Japanese	Taipei – Songshan	—	—	—	—	1 Michelin star	1 Michelin star	1 Michelin star	2 Michelin stars	2 Michelin stars
YUENJI (元紀)	Taiwanese	Taichung – Xitun	—	—	—	—	—	—	1 Michelin star	1 Michelin star	1 Michelin star
ZEA	Latin American	Taipei – Da'an	—	—	—	—	—	1 Michelin star	1 Michelin star	1 Michelin star	1 Michelin star
Reference											

== See also ==
- List of Michelin 3-star restaurants
- List of restaurants in Taiwan
- Taiwanese cuisine
