= List of Michelin-starred restaurants in Shanghai =

As of the 2026 Michelin Guide edition, there are 77 restaurants in Shanghai with a Michelin-star rating.

The Michelin Guides have been published by the French tire company Michelin since 1900. They were designed as a guide to tell drivers about eateries they recommended to visit and to subtly sponsor their tires, by encouraging drivers to use their cars more and therefore need to replace the tires as they wore out. Over time, the stars that were given out became more valuable.

Multiple anonymous Michelin inspectors visit the restaurants several times. They rate the restaurants on five criteria: "quality of products", "mastery of flavor and cooking techniques", "the personality of the chef represented in the dining experience", "value for money", and "consistency between inspectors' visits". Inspectors have at least ten years of expertise and create a list of popular restaurants supported by media reports, reviews, and diner popularity. If they reach a consensus, Michelin awards restaurants from one to three stars based on its evaluation methodology: One star means "high-quality cooking, worth a stop", two stars signify "excellent cooking, worth a detour", and three stars denote "exceptional cuisine, worth a special journey". The stars are not permanent and restaurants are constantly being reevaluated. If the criteria are not met, the restaurant will lose its stars.

The 2017 edition was the first edition of the Michelin Guide for Shanghai. The 2022 edition awarded Tai'an Table a Green Star which is launched in 2020 worldwide to honor restaurants that are committed to more sustainable and eco-friendly gastronomy. Beginning in 2026, the Michelin Guide combines restaurant selections from Shanghai, Jiangsu, and Zhejiang, adding 4 more cities in the region.

== Lists ==
=== 2021–2026 ===
Key
1 Michelin star	One Michelin star
2 Michelin stars	Two Michelin stars
3 Michelin stars	Three Michelin stars
—	The restaurant did not receive a star that year
Closed	The restaurant is no longer open

Michelin-starred restaurants
Name	Cuisine	Location	2021	2022	2023	2024	2025	2026
102 House (壹零贰小馆)	Cantonese	Huangpu	—	—	2 Michelin stars	2 Michelin stars	2 Michelin stars	2 Michelin stars
8½ Otto e Mezzo Bombana	Italian	Huangpu	2 Michelin stars	2 Michelin stars	2 Michelin stars	2 Michelin stars	2 Michelin stars	2 Michelin stars
Amazing Chinese Cuisine (菁禧薈（長寧）)	Teochew	Changning	1 Michelin star	1 Michelin star	1 Michelin star	1 Michelin star	1 Michelin star	2 Michelin stars
Bao Li Xuan (寶麗軒) at Bulgari Hotel Shanghai	Cantonese	Jing'an	2 Michelin stars	2 Michelin stars	2 Michelin stars	2 Michelin stars	2 Michelin stars	2 Michelin stars
Canton 8 (Runan Street) (喜粵8號（汝南街）)	Cantonese	Huangpu	2 Michelin stars	2 Michelin stars	2 Michelin stars	2 Michelin stars	2 Michelin stars	2 Michelin stars
Canton Table (三号黄埔会)	Cantonese	Huangpu	1 Michelin star	1 Michelin star	1 Michelin star	1 Michelin star	1 Michelin star	1 Michelin star
Cheng Long Hang (Huangpu) (成隆行蟹王府（黃浦)	Shanghainese	Huangpu	1 Michelin star	1 Michelin star	1 Michelin star	1 Michelin star	1 Michelin star	1 Michelin star
Da Dong (Xuhui) (大董（徐匯）)	Chinese Contemporary	Xuhui	1 Michelin star	1 Michelin star	1 Michelin star	1 Michelin star	1 Michelin star	1 Michelin star
Da Dong (Jing'an) (大董海參店（靜安）)	Chinese Contemporary	Jing'an	1 Michelin star	1 Michelin star	1 Michelin star	—	—	—
Da Vittorio	Italian	Huangpu	2 Michelin stars	2 Michelin stars	2 Michelin stars	2 Michelin stars	2 Michelin stars	2 Michelin stars
EHB	European Contemporary	Xuhui	—	—	—	1 Michelin star	1 Michelin star	—
Fabula	Innovative	Jing'an	—	—	—	—	—	1 Michelin star
Fu 1015 (福一零一五)	Shanghainese	Changning	—	1 Michelin star	1 Michelin star	1 Michelin star	1 Michelin star	1 Michelin star
Fu 1088 (福一零八八)	Shanghainese	Changning	—	1 Michelin star	1 Michelin star	1 Michelin star	1 Michelin star	1 Michelin star
Fu 1039 (福一零三九)	Shanghainese	Changning	—	—	1 Michelin star	1 Michelin star	1 Michelin star	1 Michelin star
Fu He Hui (福和慧)	Vegetarian	Changning	1 Michelin star	1 Michelin star	1 Michelin star	1 Michelin star	2 Michelin stars	2 Michelin stars
Gastro Esthetics by Da Dong (美 大董)	Chinese Contemporary	Jing'an	—	—	—	—	1 Michelin star	1 Michelin star
Huaiyang Delights (三月醉淮揚（靜安）)	Huaiyang	Jing'an	—	—	—	—	—	1 Michelin star
Il Ristorante - Niko Romito	Italian	Jing'an	1 Michelin star	1 Michelin star	1 Michelin star	1 Michelin star	1 Michelin star	1 Michelin star
Imperial Treasure (御寶軒（黃浦）)	Cantonese	Huangpu	2 Michelin stars	2 Michelin stars	2 Michelin stars	2 Michelin stars	2 Michelin stars	2 Michelin stars
Jade Mansion (蘇浙總會)	Huaiyang	Pudong	1 Michelin star	—	—	—	—	—
Jean Georges	French	Huangpu	1 Michelin star	1 Michelin star	1 Michelin star	1 Michelin star	—	—
Ji Pin Court (吉品軒)	Cantonese	Xuhui	2 Michelin stars	2 Michelin stars	2 Michelin stars	2 Michelin stars	2 Michelin stars	2 Michelin stars
Jin Xuan (金軒)	Cantonese	Pudong	1 Michelin star	1 Michelin star	1 Michelin star	1 Michelin star	1 Michelin star	1 Michelin star
L'Atelier de Joel Robuchon	French	Huangpu	2 Michelin stars	2 Michelin stars	2 Michelin stars	Closed		
Lao Zheng Xing (Huangpu) (老正興（黃浦）)	Shanghainese	Huangpu	1 Michelin star	1 Michelin star	1 Michelin star	1 Michelin star	1 Michelin star	1 Michelin star
Le Comptoir de Pierre Gagnaire	French	Xuhui	1 Michelin star	1 Michelin star	1 Michelin star	1 Michelin star	1 Michelin star	1 Michelin star
Le Patio & La Famille (Huangpu) (南麓．浙里（黃浦)）	Huangzhou	Huangpu	1 Michelin star	1 Michelin star	—	—	—	—
Lei Garden (Pudong) (利苑（浦東新區）)	Cantonese	Pudong	1 Michelin star	1 Michelin star	1 Michelin star	1 Michelin star	1 Michelin star	1 Michelin star
Lei Garden (Xuhui) (利苑（徐匯）)	Cantonese	Xuhui	1 Michelin star	1 Michelin star	1 Michelin star	1 Michelin star	1 Michelin star	1 Michelin star
Ling Long (凌珑)	Innovative	Huangpu	—	—	—	1 Michelin star	1 Michelin star	1 Michelin star
Lu Style (鲁采)	Shandong	Huangpu	—	—	1 Michelin star	1 Michelin star	1 Michelin star	1 Michelin star
Maison Lamelosie (萊美露滋)	French Contemporary	Pudong	1 Michelin star	1 Michelin star	1 Michelin star	1 Michelin star	1 Michelin star	1 Michelin star
Meet the Bund (遇外滩)	Fujian	Huangpu	1 Michelin star	1 Michelin star	1 Michelin star	1 Michelin star	1 Michelin star	1 Michelin star
Ming Court (明閣)	Cantonese	Minhang	1 Michelin star	1 Michelin star	1 Michelin star	1 Michelin star	1 Michelin star	1 Michelin star
Moose (鹿園（長寧）)	Jiangzhe	Changning	1 Michelin star	1 Michelin star	1 Michelin star	1 Michelin star	1 Michelin star	1 Michelin star
Moose (Pudong) (鹿園（浦東新區）)	Jiangzhe	Pudong	1 Michelin star	1 Michelin star	1 Michelin star	1 Michelin star	1 Michelin star	1 Michelin star
Narisawa	Innovative	Putuo	—	—	—	—	1 Michelin star	1 Michelin star
New Wave by Da Vittorio	Italian	Jing'an	—	—	—	1 Michelin star	Closed	
Obscura	Innovative	Jing'an	—	1 Michelin star	1 Michelin star	1 Michelin star	1 Michelin star	1 Michelin star
Oriental Sense & Palate (东方景宴)	Teochew	Huangpu	—	1 Michelin star	1 Michelin star	1 Michelin star	1 Michelin star	1 Michelin star
Phenix (斐霓絲)	French	Jing'an	1 Michelin star	1 Michelin star	1 Michelin star	1 Michelin star	1 Michelin star	—
Ren He Guan (Zhaojiabang Road) (人和馆 （肇家浜路））	Shanghainese	Xuhui	1 Michelin star	1 Michelin star	1 Michelin star	1 Michelin star	1 Michelin star	1 Michelin star
Seventh Son (Jingan) (家全七福（靜安）)	Cantonese	Jing'an	1 Michelin star	1 Michelin star	1 Michelin star	1 Michelin star	1 Michelin star	1 Michelin star
Shanghai High Cuisine (迷上海)	Shanghainese	Pudong	1 Michelin star	1 Michelin star	1 Michelin star	—	—	—
Sheng Yong Xing (晟永兴)	Beijing cuisine	Huangpu	—	1 Michelin star	1 Michelin star	1 Michelin star	1 Michelin star	1 Michelin star
Sir Elly's (艾利爵士)	European Contemporary	Huangpu	1 Michelin star	1 Michelin star	1 Michelin star	—	—	—
Sole (景煊)	Cantonese	Jing'an	—	—	—	—	1 Michelin star	1 Michelin star
T'ang Court (唐閣)	Cantonese	Huangpu	1 Michelin star	1 Michelin star	1 Michelin star	1 Michelin star	1 Michelin star	2 Michelin stars
Tai'an Table (泰安門)	Innovative	Changning	2 Michelin stars	3 Michelin stars	3 Michelin stars	3 Michelin stars	3 Michelin stars	3 Michelin stars
Tea Culture (逸道) (Huangpu Dong Road)	Huaiyang	Huangpu	1 Michelin star	1 Michelin star	1 Michelin star	1 Michelin star	—	—
The House of Rong ( 荣府宴) (Note: Formerly Xin Ron Ji (Nanyang Road) (新榮記（南陽路. Name change in 2024.)	Taizhou	Jing'an	2 Michelin stars	2 Michelin stars	2 Michelin stars	2 Michelin stars	2 Michelin stars	2 Michelin stars
Tou Zao (头灶)	Cantonese	Jing'an	—	—	—	1 Michelin star	1 Michelin star	2 Michelin stars
Wu You Xian (屋有鲜)	Dim Sum	Huangpu	—	—	—	—	1 Michelin star	1 Michelin star
Ultraviolet by Paul Pairet	Innovative	Huangpu	3 Michelin stars	3 Michelin stars	3 Michelin stars	3 Michelin stars	3 Michelin stars	Closed
Vivant by Johnny Pham	French	Huangpu	—	—	—	—	—	1 Michelin star
Xin Rong Ji (West Nanjing Road) (新榮記（南京西路）)	Taizhou	Jing'an	1 Michelin star	1 Michelin star	1 Michelin star	1 Michelin star	1 Michelin star	1 Michelin star
Yi Long Court (逸龍閣)	Cantonese	Huangpu	1 Michelin star	1 Michelin star	1 Michelin star	1 Michelin star	1 Michelin star	1 Michelin star
Yong Fu (Maoming Road) (甬府)	Ningbo	Huangpu	1 Michelin star	1 Michelin star	1 Michelin star	1 Michelin star	1 Michelin star	1 Michelin star
Yong Fu ( 甬府) (Hongkou)	Ningbo	Huangpu	—	—	1 Michelin star	1 Michelin star	1 Michelin star	1 Michelin star
Yong Foo Elite (雍福會)	Shanghainese	Xuhui	2 Michelin stars	1 Michelin star	1 Michelin star	1 Michelin star	1 Michelin star	—
Yong Yi Ting (雍頤庭)	Jiangzhe	Pudong	1 Michelin star	1 Michelin star	1 Michelin star	1 Michelin star	1 Michelin star	1 Michelin star
Yue Hai Tang	Cantonese	Minhang	—	—	—	1 Michelin star	1 Michelin star	1 Michelin star
Yu Zhi Lan (玉芝蘭)	Sichuan	Jing'an	1 Michelin star	1 Michelin star	1 Michelin star	1 Michelin star	Closed	
Zhou She (周舍) (Minhang)	Shanghainese	Minhang	—	—	—	—	1 Michelin star	1 Michelin star
Reference								

=== 2017–2020 ===
Key
1 Michelin star	One Michelin star
2 Michelin stars	Two Michelin stars
3 Michelin stars	Three Michelin stars
—	The restaurant did not receive a star that year

Michelin-starred restaurants
Name	Cuisine	Location	2017	2018	2019	2020
8½ Otto e Mezzo Bombana	Italian	Huangpu	2 Michelin stars	2 Michelin stars	2 Michelin stars	2 Michelin stars
Amazing Chinese Cuisine (菁禧薈（長寧）)	Teochew	Changning	—	—	1 Michelin star	1 Michelin star
Bo Shanghai	Chinese fusion	Huangpu	—	1 Michelin star	1 Michelin star	—
Bao Li Xuan (寶麗軒) at Bulgari Hotel Shanghai	Cantonese	Jing'an	—	—	—	1 Michelin star
Canton 8 (Runan Street) (喜粵8號（汝南街）)	Cantonese	Huangpu	2 Michelin stars	2 Michelin stars	2 Michelin stars	2 Michelin stars
Cheng Long Hang (Huangpu) (成隆行蟹王府（黃浦）)	Shanghainese	Huangpu	—	—	—	1 Michelin star
Da Dong (Xuhui) (大董（徐匯）)	Chinese Contemporary	Xuhui	1 Michelin star	1 Michelin star	1 Michelin star	1 Michelin star
Da Dong (Jing'an) (大董海參店（靜安）)	Chinese Contemporary	Jing'an	1 Michelin star	1 Michelin star	1 Michelin star	1 Michelin star
Da Vittorio	Italian	Huangpu	—	—	—	1 Michelin star
Fu He Hui (福和慧)	Vegetarian	Changning	1 Michelin star	1 Michelin star	1 Michelin star	1 Michelin star
Il Ristorante - Niko Romito	Italian	Jing'an	—	—	1 Michelin star	1 Michelin star
Imperial Treasure (御寶軒（黃浦）)	Cantonese	Huangpu	2 Michelin stars	2 Michelin stars	2 Michelin stars	2 Michelin stars
Jade Mansion (蘇浙總會)	Huaiyang	Pudong	1 Michelin star	1 Michelin star	1 Michelin star	1 Michelin star
Jean Georges	French	Huangpu	—	1 Michelin star	1 Michelin star	1 Michelin star
Ji Pin Court (吉品軒)	Cantonese	Xuhui	—	—	1 Michelin star	2 Michelin stars
Jin Xuan (金軒)	Cantonese	Pudong	1 Michelin star	1 Michelin star	—	1 Michelin star
L'Atelier de Joel Robuchon	French	Huangpu	2 Michelin stars	2 Michelin stars	2 Michelin stars	2 Michelin stars
Kanpai Classic (老乾杯)	Barbecue	Huangpu	1 Michelin star	1 Michelin star	—	—
Lao Zheng Xing (Huangpu) (老正興（黃浦）)	Shanghainese	Huangpu	1 Michelin star	1 Michelin star	1 Michelin star	1 Michelin star
Le Comptoir de Pierre Gagnaire	French	Xuhui	—	—	1 Michelin star	1 Michelin star
Le Patio & La Famille (Huangpu) (南麓．浙里（黃浦)）	Hangzhou	Huangpu	1 Michelin star	1 Michelin star	1 Michelin star	1 Michelin star
Lei Garden (Pudong) (利苑（浦東新區）)	Cantonese	Pudong	1 Michelin star	1 Michelin star	1 Michelin star	1 Michelin star
Lei Garden (Xuhui) (利苑（徐匯）)	Cantonese	Xuhui	1 Michelin star	1 Michelin star	1 Michelin star	1 Michelin star
Madam Goose (Minhang) (鵝夫人)	Cantonese	Minhang	1 Michelin star	1 Michelin star	1 Michelin star	—
Maison Lamelosie (萊美露滋)	French contemporary	Pudong	—	—	—	1 Michelin star
Ming Court (明閣)	Cantonese	Minhang|	—	—	—	1 Michelin star
Moose (鹿園（長寧）)	Jiangzhe	Changning	—	—	1 Michelin star	1 Michelin star
Moose (Pudong) (鹿園（浦東新區）)	Jiangzhe	Pudong	—	—	—	1 Michelin star
Phenix (斐霓絲)	French	Jing'an	1 Michelin star	1 Michelin star	1 Michelin star	1 Michelin star
Seventh Son (Jingan) (家全七福（靜安）)	Cantonese	Jing'an	1 Michelin star	1 Michelin star	1 Michelin star	1 Michelin star
Shanghai High Cuisine (迷上海)	Shanghainese	Pudong	1 Michelin star	1 Michelin star	1 Michelin star	1 Michelin star
Sir Elly's (艾利爵士)	European contemporary	Huangpu	1 Michelin star	1 Michelin star	1 Michelin star	1 Michelin star
T'ang Court (唐閣)	Cantonese	Huangpu	3 Michelin stars	3 Michelin stars	2 Michelin stars	1 Michelin star
Tai'an Table (泰安門)	Innovative	Changning	1 Michelin star	1 Michelin star	1 Michelin star	2 Michelin stars
Ultraviolet by Paul Pairet	Innovative	Huangpu	2 Michelin stars	3 Michelin stars	3 Michelin stars	3 Michelin stars
Wujie (Huangpu) (大蔬無界（黃浦）)	Vegetarian	Huangpu	—	1 Michelin star	1 Michelin star	1 Michelin star
Xin Rong Ji (Nanyang Road) (新榮記（南陽路）)	Taizhou	Jing'an	—	—	2 Michelin stars	2 Michelin stars
Xin Rong Ji (Shanghai Plaza) (新榮記（上海廣場）)	Taizhou	Huangpu	1 Michelin star	1 Michelin star	1 Michelin star	—
Xin Rong Ji (West Nanjing Road) (新榮記（南京西路）)	Taizhou	Jing'an	—	—	—	1 Michelin star
Yi Long Court (逸龍閣)	Cantonese	Huangpu	2 Michelin stars	2 Michelin stars	2 Michelin stars	1 Michelin star
Yong Fu (甬府)	Ningbo	Huangpu	—	1 Michelin star	1 Michelin star	1 Michelin star
Yong Foo Elite (雍福會)	Shanghainese	Xuhui	2 Michelin stars	2 Michelin stars	2 Michelin stars	2 Michelin stars
Yong Yi Ting (雍頤庭)	Jiangzhe	Pudong	1 Michelin star	1 Michelin star	1 Michelin star	1 Michelin star
Yu Zhi Lan (玉芝蘭)	Sichuan	Jing'an	—	—	—	1 Michelin star
Reference						

== See also ==
- List of Michelin-starred restaurants in Beijing
- List of Michelin-starred restaurants in Hangzhou
- List of Michelin-starred restaurants in Hong Kong & Macau
