= Michelin Guide =

Hotel and restaurant guide

- Categories: Gastronomy, tourism
- Frequency: Yearly
- Founder: Édouard Michelin; André Michelin
- First issue: 1900; 126 years ago
- Company: Michelin
- Country: France
- Website: guide.michelin.com

The Michelin Guide (/ˈmɪʃəlɪn, ˈmɪtʃəlɪn/ MISH-əl-in, MITCH-əl-in; French: Guide Michelin [ɡid miʃlɛ̃]) is a restaurant and hotel guide that has been published by the French tyre company Michelin since 1900. Originally created as a guide for French motorists, it later developed into an international reference for dining and travel. It awards up to three Michelin stars for excellence to a select few restaurants in certain geographic areas based on evaluations by anonymous inspectors. Michelin also publishes the Green Guides, a series of general guides to cities, regions, and countries.

== History ==
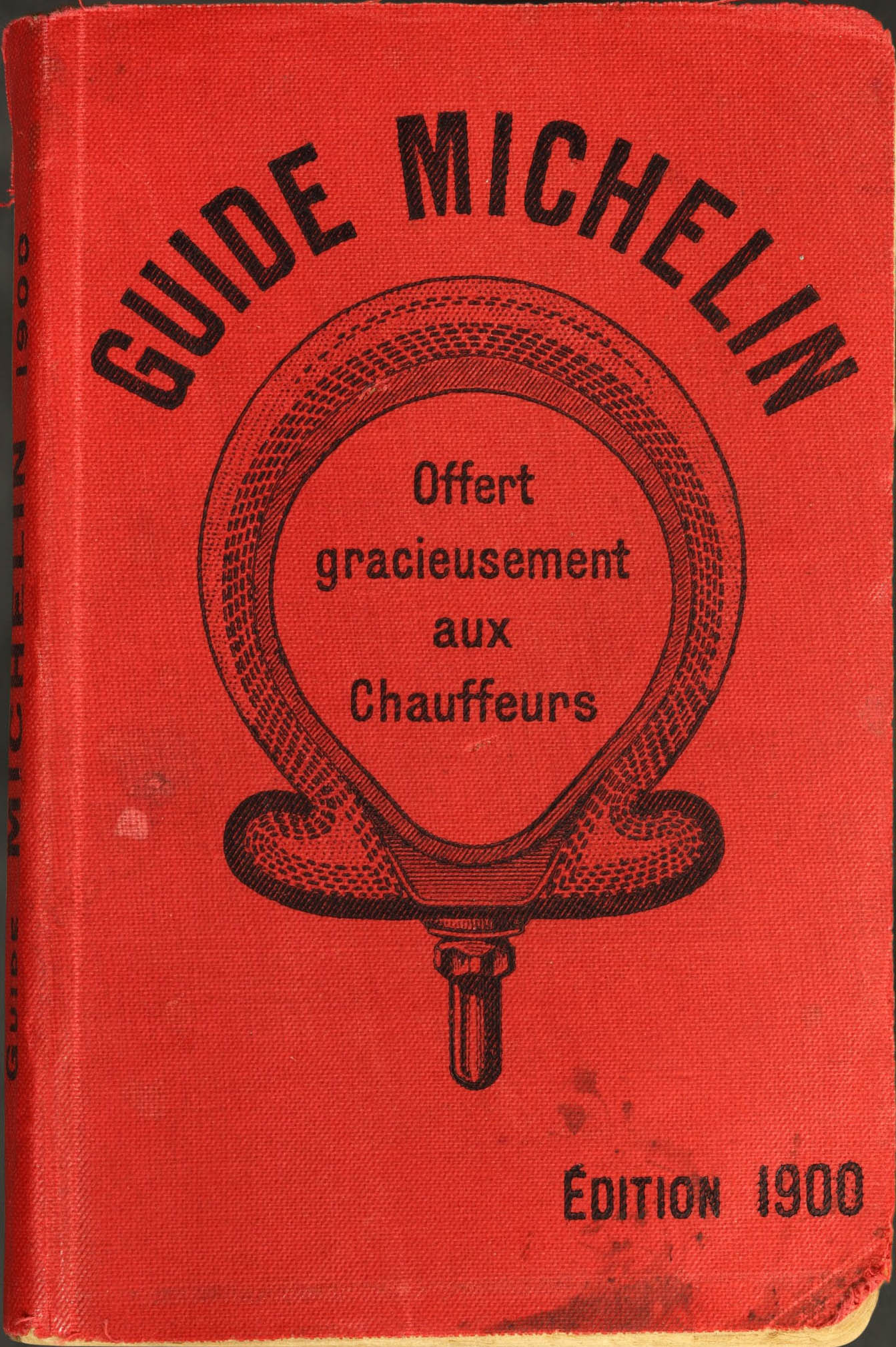
The first Michelin Guide, published in 1900

In 1900, there were fewer than 3,000 cars on the roads of France. To increase the demand for cars, and accordingly car tyres, car tyre manufacturers and brothers Édouard and André Michelin published a guide for French motorists, the Guide Michelin (Michelin Guide). Michelin distributed nearly 35,000 copies of this first, free edition. It provided information to motorists such as maps, tyre repair and replacement instructions, and listings of auto mechanics, hotels, and petrol stations throughout France.

The founders thought the Guide might encourage car owners to drive more, which would increase tyre wear and in turn boost replacement sales. In 1904, the brothers published a guide for Belgium; and then for Algeria and Tunisia (1907); the Alps and the Rhine (northern Italy, Switzerland, Bavaria, and the Netherlands) (1908); Germany, Spain, and Portugal (1910); the British Isles (1911); and "The Countries of the Sun" (Les Pays du Soleil) covering northern Africa, southern Italy, and Corsica (1911). In 1909, Michelin published an English-language translation of the guide to France.

During World War I, Michelin suspended publication of the Guide. After the war, revised editions of the guide continued to be given away until 1920. Then, when André Michelin visited a tyre merchant and noticed copies of the guide being used to prop up a workbench, he recalled the principle that "man only truly respects what he pays for". Michelin began to charge for the guide, 7 francs in 1922 (equivalent to €9 in 2025). Michelin also made several changes, such as listing restaurants by specific categories, adding hotel listings (initially only for Paris), and removing advertisements. Recognizing the growing popularity of the restaurant section, the brothers recruited a team of anonymous inspectors to visit and review restaurants. Following the usage in Murray's Handbooks for Travellers and the Baedeker Guides, Michelin's guide began to award stars for superior restaurants in 1926. Initially, Michelin awarded only one star to the best restaurants. In 1931, Michelin introduced a hierarchy of zero, one, two, and three stars for restaurants. In 1936, Michelin published the criteria for its restaurant rankings:

- : "A very good restaurant in its category" (Une très bonne table dans sa catégorie)
- : "Excellent cooking, worth a detour" (Table excellente, mérite un détour)
- : "Exceptional cuisine, worth a special journey" (Une des meilleures tables, vaut le voyage).

The 1911 Michelin Guide for the British Isles

In 1931, Michelin changed the color of the cover from blue to red, which has continued in all later editions. During World War II, Michelin again suspended publication. In 1944, at the Allied Forces' request, the 1939 guide to France was specially reprinted for military use; its maps were judged the best and most up-to-date available. Publication of the annual guide resumed on 16 May 1945, a week after Victory in Europe Day. In the early post-war years, the lingering effects of wartime shortages led Michelin to impose an upper limit of two stars in restaurant ratings; by 1950, the French edition listed 38 establishments judged to meet this standard. In 1954, the guide cost 750 francs (equivalent to €20 in 2025). The first Michelin Guide for Italy was published in 1956. It awarded no stars in the first edition. In 1974, the first guide to Britain since 1931 was published. Twenty-five stars were awarded.

In 2005, Michelin published its first American guide, covering 500 restaurants in the five boroughs of New York City and 50 hotels in Manhattan. In 2007, a Tokyo guide was launched. In the same year, the guide introduced a magazine, Étoile. In 2008, a Hong Kong and Macau volume was added. As of 2013, the guide was published in 14 editions covering 23 countries. In 2008, the German restaurateur Juliane Caspar was appointed the first woman and first non-French national editor-in-chief of the French edition of the guide. She had previously been responsible for the Michelin guides to Germany, Switzerland and Austria. The German newspaper Die Welt commented on the appointment, "In view of the fact German cuisine is regarded as a lethal weapon in most parts of France, this decision is like Mercedes announcing that its new director of product development is a Martian."

The Korea Tourism Organization commissioned Michelin to include South Korea in its 2016 edition at a cost of 3.2 billion won (over US$1 million); government officials were unhappy with the resulting inaccuracies, which included typographic errors, translation errors, and description errors regarding seating options. In 2017, the Tourism Authority of Thailand agreed to pay 144 million Thai baht (US$4.4 million) over five years for the inclusion of their country. In 2022, the guide expanded to Canada, with guides covering Toronto and Vancouver, in return for undisclosed payments from each city's local chapter of Destination Canada. The guide announced its first list of restaurants in the US state of Florida on 9 June 2022, after the state and city tourism boards in Miami, Orlando, and Tampa, agreed to collectively pay the company up to US$1.5 million. The guide awarded a single two-star ranking and fourteen one-star rankings, and 29 Bib Gourmands.

In late 2022, the guide expanded to Vietnam, Malaysia, Estonia, and the United Arab Emirates in return for undisclosed payments. In February 2023, Israel's Ministry of Tourism announced a bid to bring the Michelin Guide to their country for a payment of €1.5 million. Also in 2023, the guide expanded to several cities in Colorado (Aspen, Beaver Creek Resort, Boulder, Denver, Snowmass Village, and Vail) that paid between US$70,000 and US$100,000 on top of a state contribution; other cities (Aurora, Colorado Springs, Fort Collins, and Grand Junction) declined to participate. In September 2023 the Michelin Guide also expanded to Atlanta, in return for a payment of US$1 million over three years. In October 2023, the guide announced that it would start awarding stars to hotels (following the restaurant model).

In the early 2020s, Michelin began requiring certain countries which had previously received reviews to pay for continued coverage. Hungary, Slovenia, and the Czech Republic agreed to do so. In 2025, the guide planned to expand to the southeastern United States, called the American South edition, which includes Alabama, Louisiana, Mississippi, North Carolina, South Carolina, and Tennessee. The edition will include the Atlanta guide. A few months later, on 12 May 2025, Michelin announced plans to expand the guide to Boston and Philadelphia, with the restaurant selections to be revealed later in the year. The press release stated that these would be included in the "newly minted MICHELIN Guide Northeast Cities edition", which would also include the already-rated cities of Chicago, New York City, and Washington, D.C. Tourism board Meet Boston reportedly paid over $1 million for three years of coverage, sourced from hotel surcharges in Boston and neighbouring Cambridge, Massachusetts. Michelin planned expansion to the Philippines in 2026, covering the Greater Manila Area and Cebu.

== Transition to digital publication ==
The Michelin Guide ended printed copies in 2021 in most markets. After 121 years, Michelin transitioned to digital publication and released a proprietary app. This allowed Michelin to distribute the guide to a larger audience at no charge. As of 2024, a handful of popular regions, France, Italy, Japan and Spain, remain in printed publication.

== Methods and layout ==
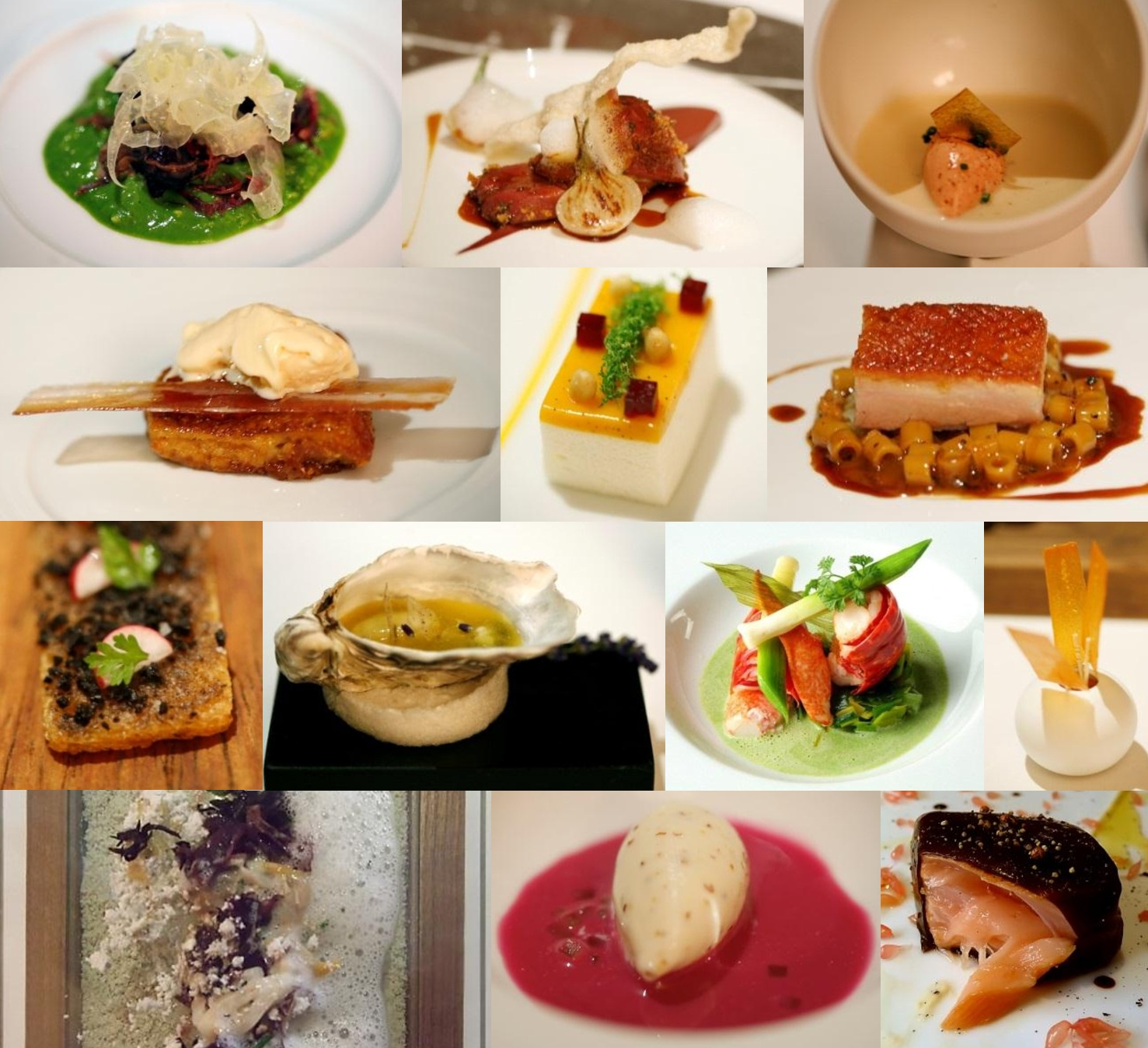
Dishes made by Michelin-starred restaurants

Red Guides have historically listed many more restaurants than rival guides, relying on an extensive system of symbols to describe each one in as little as two lines. Reviews of starred restaurants also include two to three culinary specialties. Short summaries (2–3 lines) were added in 2002/2003 to enhance descriptions of many establishments. These summaries are written in the language of the country for which the guide is published (though the Spain and Portugal volume is in Spanish only) but the symbols are the same throughout all editions.

=== Stars ===
Michelin inspectors (reviewers) visit restaurants anonymously, and they award one, two, or three stars for those considered at least very good:

- : "High-quality cooking, worth a stop" (Cuisine de qualité, mérite une halte)
- : "Excellent cooking, worth a detour" (Cuisine excellente, mérite un détour)
- : "Exceptional cuisine, worth a special journey" (Une des meilleures cuisines, vaut le voyage).

The Michelin Guide website gives a comprehensive explanation of the stars and criteria for awarding them:

One MICHELIN Star is awarded to restaurants using top quality ingredients, where dishes with distinct flavours are prepared to a consistently high standard.

Two MICHELIN Stars are awarded when the personality and talent of the chef are evident in their expertly crafted dishes; their food is refined and inspired.

Three MICHELIN Stars is our highest award, given for the superlative cooking of chefs at the peak of their profession; their cooking is elevated to an art form and some of their dishes are destined to become classics.

Inspectors' meals and expenses are paid for by Michelin, never by a restaurant being reviewed.

Michelin has gone to extraordinary lengths to maintain the anonymity of its inspectors. Many of the company's top executives have never met an inspector; inspectors themselves are advised not to disclose their line of work, even to their parents (who might be tempted to boast about it); and, in all the years that it has been putting out the guide, Michelin has refused to allow its inspectors to speak to journalists. The inspectors write reports that are distilled, in annual "stars meetings" at the guide's various national offices, into the ranking of three stars, two stars, or one star—or no stars (establishments that Michelin deems unworthy of a visit are not included in the guide).

The French chef Paul Bocuse, one of the pioneers of nouvelle cuisine in the 1960s, said, "Michelin is the only guide that counts." In France, when the guide is published each year, it sparks a media frenzy which has been compared to that for annual Academy Awards for films. Media and others debate likely winners, speculation is rife, and TV and newspapers discuss which restaurant might lose, retain, or gain a Michelin star. The Michelin Guide also awards "Rising Stars", an indication that a restaurant has the potential to qualify for a star, or an additional star.

=== Green stars ===
Michelin green star

In 2020, the Michelin Guide launched a sustainability emblem to symbolise excellence in sustainable gastronomy. An establishment awarded this green star is given space on the Guide's website for the chef to describe the restaurant's vision. A green star can be held concurrently with other designations awarded by Michelin – including standard Michelin stars, a Bib Gourmand, or being on the recommended list. In May 2026, Michelin announced that the Green Star would be gradually phased out by the end of 2026 and replaced by an editorial platform called Mindful Voices.

=== Bib Gourmand ===
Bib Gourmand

Since 1997, the guide has highlighted restaurants offering "exceptionally good food at moderate prices", a feature now called "Bib Gourmand". They must offer a combination of menu items priced below a maximum determined by local economic standards. For example, in Canada, the 2022 criterion required a two-course meal plus a dessert or a glass of wine to remain below $60 CAD per person. The selected thresholds reflect the typical spend observed during restaurant visits: in France, it rose from the 2016 benchmarks of €32 nationally and €36 in the Paris region up to, respectively, €40 and €45 in 2025. Bib (Bibendum) is the company's nickname for the Michelin Man, its corporate logo for over a century. Like Michelin stars, a restaurant can gain or lose a Bib Gourmand designation at Michelin's annual award ceremony for the region where it operates. In exceptional circumstances, Bib Gourmand designated restaurants have gone on to receive a Michelin star in later years, including the Chicago restaurant and bakery Kasama, which earned a star in 2022 after receiving a Bib Gourmand the year prior.

=== Selected Restaurants ===
The Plate

In 2016, the Plate was added as a new symbol to recognize restaurants that "simply serve good food". In 2022, Michelin dropped the use of "the Plate" for this designation, and instead titled this tier "Selected Restaurants".

=== Keys, for hotels ===
Michelin key

Michelin began awarding "keys" to hotels starting in 2024. Michelin states that the key award will be given after stays conducted anonymously by Michelin Guide selection teams use five criteria: excellence in architecture and interior design, quality and consistency of service, overall personality and character, value for the price, and a significant contribution to the neighbourhood or setting. The Michelin Guide selection recommends over 6,000 hotels around the world.

=== Grapes, for wine estates ===
In July 2026, Michelin began awarding “grapes”, a new rating system to evaluate wine estates as opposed to specific bottles or vintages. Estates will receive one, two, or three grapes signifying very good, excellent and exceptional producers. Michelin began their selections with the Burgundy region.

== Guides ==
=== Countries ===
Location	Year	Three stars	Two stars	One star	One star or more	Green star	Bib Gourmand	Selected restaurants	Total restaurants recognized
Metropolitan France and Monaco	2026	31	84	553	668		430 (€40, €45 in Paris area in 2026)	—N/a	3,000+
Japan	2023	23	82	442	547	28	492	—N/a	1,501
Spain	2026	16	37	254	307	59	204	778	1,288
Italy	2026	15	38	341	394	72	255	1,322	1,971
United States (Note: Only select regions, states and cities are reviewed in the U.S. As of 2026, only the state of California, select cities in Colorado, select cities in Florida, Northeastern American cities, which include Boston, Chicago, New York City, Philadelphia, and Washington, D.C., the South, the Southwest, and select cities in Texas, are reviewed. Each region would have its own separate guide)	2025	14	40	226	280		434	1,066 ($49)	1,780
Germany	2026	12	48	279	339		147	—N/a	1,240+
Great Britain and Ireland (Note: England, Northern Ireland, Republic of Ireland, Scotland, and Wales all have separate articles.)	2026	10	28	192	230	37	168 (£30)	812	1,210
Nordic countries (Note: Nordic countries consists of Denmark, Finland, Iceland, Norway, and Sweden.)	2026	6	15	78	99		48	139	286
China (mainland) (Note: Only select regions and cities are reviewed in mainland China. As of 2024, only Beijing, Chengdu, Guangzhou, Hangzhou, and Shanghai are reviewed. Each region would have its own separate guide)	2024	5	18	109	131	4	183	245	485
Switzerland	2025	4	27	114	145		104	295	544
Taiwan	2026	3	9	49	61	9	146	227	434
Singapore	2025	3	7	32	42	2	89	157	288
Belgium & Luxembourg	2026	2	22	115	139		113	512	764
Austria	2026	2	19	80	101		61	258	420
Thailand	2026	2	8	33	43	5	137	288	468
United Arab Emirates	2026	2	4	17	23		32	123	178
Brazil	2026	2	3	19	24	3	44	81	149
Netherlands	2026	1	20	98	119		77 (€39)	324	499
South Korea	2026	1	10	35	46	4	71	116	233
Slovenia	2026	1	1	8	10		12	52	74
Portugal	2026	0	9	44	53	7	26	131	210
Canada (Note: As of 2026, only Quebec, Toronto, and Vancouver are reviewed.)	2026	0	3	36	39	5	70 ($60)	195	304
Mexico	2026	0	2	27	29	11	63	133	225
Türkiye	2026	0	2	15	17	13	39	115	171
Greece	2027	0	2	19	20		10	32	62
Hungary	2025	0	2	8	10	6	13	55	78
New Zealand	2026	0	1	14	15		35	60	110
Croatia	2026	0	1	13	14		14	84	112
Argentina	2026	0	1	13	14	11	11	64	89
Czechia	2026	0	1	12	13	4	27	69	109
Poland	2026	0	1	10	11	1	38	—N/a	196
Philippines	2027	0	1	9	10		31	86	127
Malaysia	2026	0	1	8	9		58	84	151
Malta	2026	0	1	6	7	0	5	36	48
Estonia	2026	0	1	1	2	3	9	32	43
Vietnam	2026	0	0	11		3	72	110	193
Lithuania	2026	0	0	5			8	31	44
Qatar	2026	0	0	3			8	33	44
Latvia	2026	0	0	2		1	5	27	34
Serbia	2026	0	0	2		0	3	20	25
Andorra (Note: Andorra is included in the Spain guide)	2026	0	0	1			—N/a	6	7
Saudi Arabia	2026	0	0	None		0	11	40	51

=== Regions and cities ===
Location	Year	Three stars	Two stars	One star	One star or more	Green star	Bib Gourmand	Selected restaurants	Total restaurants recognized
Abu Dhabi	2026	0	0	3			10	43	56
al-Ula	2026	None				0	2	3	5
American Northeast (Note: Previously listed as separate Boston, Chicago, New York City, Philadelphia, and Washington, D.C. guides.)	2025	6	22	93	121	9	166 ($40, $49 for New York area)	377	664
American South (Note: Includes Alabama, Georgia, Louisiana, Mississippi, North Carolina, South Carolina, Tennessee.)	2026	0	1	21	22		59	185	266
American Southwest	2026	0	1	4	5		18	41	64
Beijing	2027	2	5	26	33		32	42	107
Belgrade	2026	0	0	2			3	20	25
Busan	2026	0	0	4		1	20	31	55
Chengdu	2027	1	1	13	15		32	37	84
California (Note: Beginning in 2019, Los Angeles and San Francisco areas were no longer separate publications and one guide was issued for the entire state of California.)	2026	10	13	60	83	18	117	323	523
Colorado	2026	0	1	9	10		13	40	63
Doha	2026	0	0	3			8	33	44
Dubai	2026	2	4	14	20		22	80	122
Florida	2026	0	2	24	26		45	129	200
Fujian province	2026	0	0	7			66	23	96
Guangzhou & Shenzhen	2026	0	3	17	20		52	45	117
Hangzhou	2026	0	2	11	13		33	40	86
Hong Kong	2026	7	13	57	77	4	70	72	219
Hsinchu City	2026	None				0	7	20	27
Hsinchu County	2026	0	0	1		0	10	16	27
Jeddah	2026	None				0	2	11	13
Jiangsu Province	2025	0	0	5			36	33	74
Kaohsiung	2026	0	0	6		1	21	29	56
Kuala Lumpur	2026	0	1	6	7		25	45	77
Kyoto	2026	6	19	73	98	10	47	99	244
Macau	2026	2	6	13	21	1	13	25	59
Metro Manila	2027	0	1	9	10	1			
Moscow (suspended)	2021	0	2	7	9		15		
Nara Prefecture	2026	0	4	18	22	7	11	45	78
New Taipei City	2026	None				0	18	26	44
Osaka	2026	3	12	66	81	3	59	95	235
Penang	2026	0	0	2			33	39	74
Quebec	2026	0	1	12	13	5	23	85	121
Riyadh	2026	None				0	7	26	33
Seoul	2026	1	10	31	42	3	51	85	178
South Australia	2027	0	1	10	11		16	50	77
Shanghai, Jiangsu & Zhejiang	2026	1	14	62	77	1	164	168	409
Shenzen	2026	0	2	5	7		21	31	59
Taichung	2026	1	0	5	6	2	23	34	63
Tainan	2026	0	0	1		1	30	30	61
Taipei	2026	2	9	36	47	5	37	72	156
Texas	2026	0	0	19			54 ($50)	76	149
Tianjin	2027	0	0	1			16	10	27
Toronto	2026	0	1	14	15		31	65	111
Tokyo	2026	12	26	122	160	13	114	252	526
Vancouver	2026	0	1	10	11		16 ($60)	45	72

=== Non-restaurant food ===
In 2014, Michelin introduced a separate listing for gastropubs in Ireland. In 2016, the Michelin Guide for Hong Kong and Macau introduced an overview of notable street-food establishments. In the same year, the Singapore guide introduced the first Michelin stars for street-food locations, for Hong Kong Soya Sauce Chicken Rice and Noodle and Hill Street Tai Hwa Pork Noodle.

=== Other ratings ===
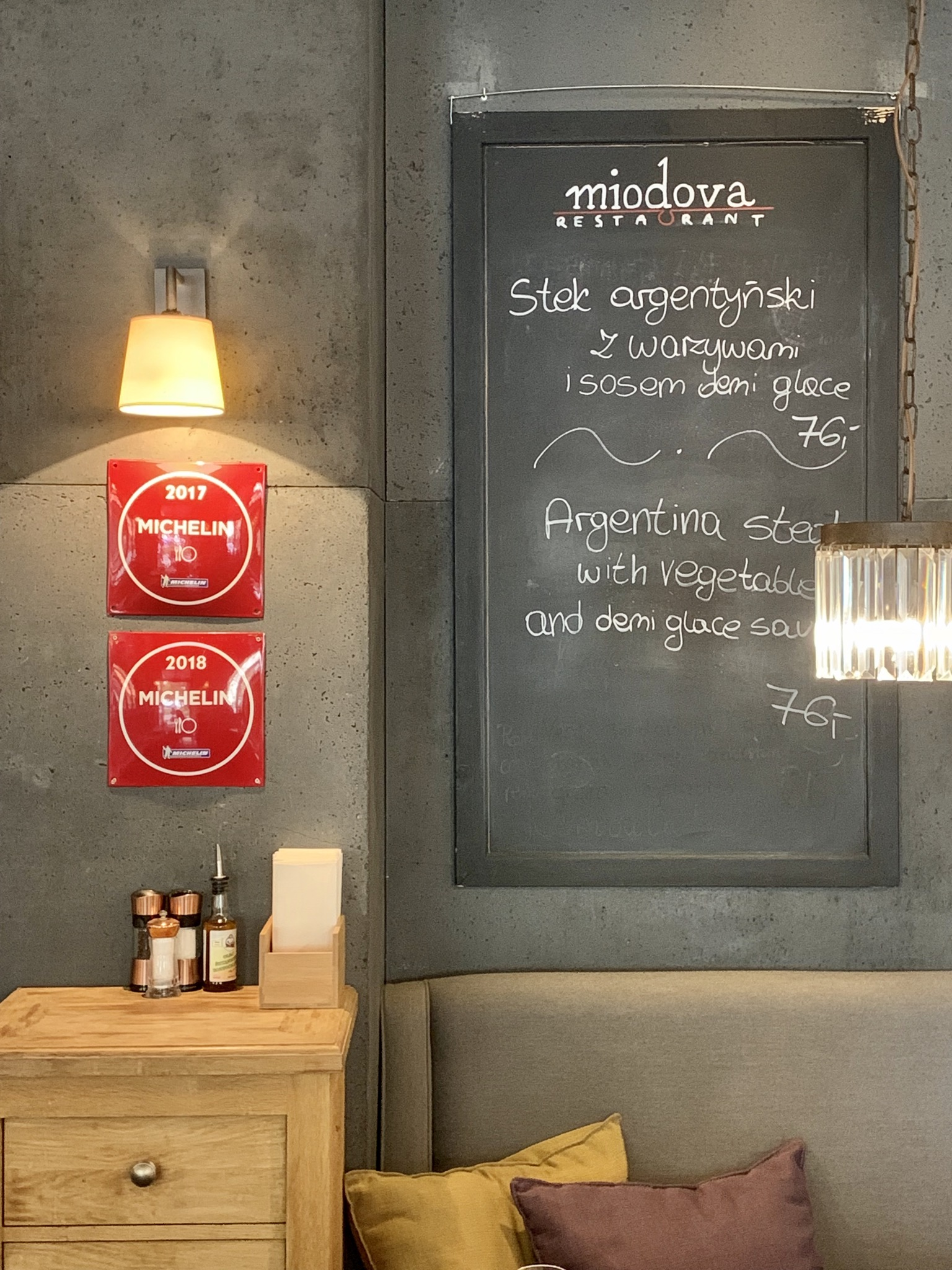
Michelin Guide "fork and spoon" red designation at Miodova Restaurant in Kraków, Poland, for 2017 and 2018

All listed restaurants, regardless of their star, Bib Gourmand, or Plate status, also receive a "fork and spoon" designation, as a subjective reflection of the overall comfort and quality of the restaurant. Rankings range from one to five: one fork and spoon represents a "comfortable restaurant" and five signifies a "luxurious restaurant". Forks and spoons coloured red designate a restaurant that is considered "pleasant" as well. Restaurants, independently of their other ratings in the guide, can also receive a number of other symbols next to their listing:

- Coins indicate restaurants that serve a menu for a certain price or less, depending on the local monetary standard. In 2010 France, 2011 US and Japan Red Guides, the maximum permitted "coin" prices were €19, $25, and ¥5000, respectively.
- Interesting view or Magnificent view, designated by a black or red symbol, are given to restaurants offering those features.
- Grapes, a sake set, or a cocktail glass indicate restaurants that offer at minimum a "somewhat interesting" selection of wines, sake, or cocktails, respectively.

== Green Guides ==
The Michelin Green Guides review and rate attractions other than restaurants. There is a Green Guide for France as a whole, and a more detailed one for each of ten regions within France. Other Green Guides cover many countries, regions, and cities outside France. Many Green Guides are published in several languages. They include background information and an alphabetical section describing points of interest. Like the Red Guides, they use a three-star system for recommending sites, ranging from "worth a trip" to "worth a detour" and "interesting".

== Controversies ==
=== Allegations of lax inspection standards and bias ===
Pascal Rémy, a veteran France-based Michelin inspector, and also a former Gault Millau employee, wrote a tell-all book, L'Inspecteur se met à table (The Inspector Sits Down at the Table), published in 2004. Rémy's employment was terminated in December 2003 when he informed Michelin of his plans to publish his book. He brought a court case for unfair dismissal, which was unsuccessful.

Rémy described the French Michelin inspector's life as lonely, underpaid drudgery, driving around France for weeks on end, dining alone, under intense pressure to file detailed reports to strict deadlines. He maintained that the guide had become lax in its standards. Although Michelin states that its inspectors visited all 4,000 reviewed restaurants in France every 18 months, and all starred restaurants several times a year, Rémy said only about one visit every 3 1/2 years was possible because there were only 11 inspectors in France when he was hired rather than the 50 or more hinted by Michelin. He said that number had shrunk to five by the time he was fired in December 2003.

Rémy accused the guide of favouritism. He alleged that Michelin treated famous and influential chefs, such as Paul Bocuse and Alain Ducasse, as "untouchable" and not subject to the same rigorous standards as lesser-known chefs. Michelin denied Rémy's charges, but refused to say how many inspectors it actually employed in France. In response to Rémy's statement that certain three-star chefs were sacrosanct, Michelin said, "There would be little sense in saying a restaurant was worth three stars if it weren't true, if for no other reason than that the customer would write and tell us."

==== Allegations of prejudice favouring French cuisine ====
Some non-French food critics have alleged that the rating system is biased in favour of French cuisine or French dining standards. British newspaper The Guardian commented in 1997 that "some people maintain the guide's principal purpose is as a tool of Gallic cultural imperialism". When Michelin published its first New York City Red Guide in 2005 Steven Kurutz of The New York Times observed that Danny Meyer's Union Square Cafe, a restaurant rated highly by The New York Times, Zagat Survey, and other prominent guides, received a no-star rating from Michelin; he acknowledged that the restaurant received positive mention for its ambiance and that two other restaurants owned by Meyer received stars. Kurutz also said the guide appeared to favour restaurants that "emphasized formality and presentation" rather than a "casual approach to fine dining". He said over half of the restaurants that received one or two stars "could be considered French". The Michelin Guide New York 2007 included 526 restaurants, compared to 2,014 in Zagat New York 2007; after The Four Seasons Restaurant received no stars in that edition, co-owner Julian Niccolini said Michelin "should stay in France, and they should keep their guide there".

==== Allegations of leniency with stars for Japanese cuisine ====
In 2007, Tokyo's restaurants were awarded the most stars and in 2010 other Japanese cities like Kyoto and Osaka also received many stars. At the time this sparked questions from some over whether these high ratings were merited for Japanese restaurants, or whether the Michelin Guide was too generous in giving out stars to gain an acceptance with Japanese customers and to enable the tyre-selling parent company to market itself in Japan. Some argued that the discrepancy is explained by the difference in total restaurants in each city: Tokyo has 160,000 restaurants while Paris, for example, has just 40,000. The Wall Street Journal reported in 2010 that some Japanese chefs were surprised at receiving a star and were reluctant to accept one because the publicity caused an unmanageable jump in bookings, affecting their ability to serve their traditional customers without compromising by lowering the quality of their dishes.

=== Unwanted stars ===
Some restaurateurs have asked Michelin to revoke a star because they felt that it created undesirable customer expectations, or pressure to spend more on service and decor. Notable cases include:

- Casa Julio (Fontanars dels Alforins, Spain). After receiving a star for a perfumed cuisine in 2009, the restaurant chef Julio Biosca felt the award was granted to dishes that he did not like and which restricted his creativity. He tried to remove his star, and in December 2013 he discontinued his tasting menu. The removal took place in the 2015 guide.
- Petersham Nurseries Café (London): After receiving a star in 2011, founder and chef Skye Gyngell received complaints from customers expecting formal dining, leading to her attempt to remove the star, and her subsequent retirement from the restaurant. She has since said she regretted her remarks and would have welcomed a star.
- 't Huis van Lede (Belgium). After receiving a star in 2014, chef Frederick Dhooge said he did not want his Michelin star or his points in the Gault-Millau restaurant guide, stating: "We noticed that this is not always understood by a group of customers that expect a spectacle of stars and points kitchen" from a Michelin-starred restaurant rather than simple food. Dhooge complained about expectations for decor and originality: "The customers expect a parade of appetizers when the gastronomic menu starts, in a setting that, according to them, also deserves one star. Take a shrimp croquette. People expect a starred chef to give his own interpretation of that dish. I just want to make a really good shrimp croquette."
- Marco Pierre White, the first British chef to be awarded three Michelin stars, quit his restaurant and returned his stars in 1999, citing the pressure of maintaining them and the resulting monotony, and questioning the competence of the inspectors who granted them.

=== Losing stars ===
The pressure to retain Michelin stars can be immense, as the loss of a star will almost inevitably have a significant impact on business. It is widely believed that chef Bernard Loiseau died by suicide in 2003 after hearing the rumour that his three-star restaurant, La Côte d'Or, would be demoted to two stars.

=== Mistakes ===
In 2017, the Bouche à Oreille café in Bourges, France, was accidentally given a star when it was confused with a restaurant of the same name in Boutervilliers, near Paris.

=== Influence on cuisine and working conditions ===
In the 21st century, some American chefs, restaurant owners, and officials interviewed by The New York Times criticised the guide for creating a type of sameness, rewarding expensive fine dining attributes, luxury ingredients, expensive tableware, matching uniforms, many-course menus, small bites, and meticulously arranged plating. High-quality fine dining in Western countries is labour-intensive, putting pressure on line chef wages. Because of their high status, Michelin-starred fine dining restaurants often rely on staging, a form of unpaid internship. At the three-star restaurant Noma, chef-owner René Redzepi yielded to public pressure in 2022 and began paying interns. After three months, Redzepi announced the restaurant was no longer financially sustainable and that the concept would close at the end of 2024. The power imbalance between chef-owners and staff has also resulted in workers at some fine-dining restaurants producing intricate dishes complaining of very long hours, difficulty affording food, physical and sexual abuse, refusal of permission to treat injuries at a hospital, and destruction of workers' personal property. Most chefs interviewed by The New York Times said the increase in business and job applicants that comes with the publicity around a Michelin star makes it worth seeking. Many also said the competition for stars improves restaurant quality.

== See also ==
- List of female chefs with Michelin stars
- List of Michelin 3-star restaurants
- Lists of Michelin-starred restaurants
- The World's 50 Best Restaurants
