= List of Michelin-starred restaurants in Finland =

As of the 2026 Michelin Guide, there are 8 restaurants in Finland with a Michelin-star rating, a rating system used by the Michelin Guide to grade restaurants based on their quality.

Prior to 2014, major cities from Denmark, Finland, Norway, and Sweden were covered in the Michelin Guide Main Cities of Europe edition beginning with Copenhagen, Denmark in 1983. Oslo and Stockholm would be added in 1984 and Helsinki in 1987. Gothenburg would be added in 1990. Beginning in 2014, Denmark, Finland, Norway, and Sweden began being grouped together in The Michelin Guide Nordic Countries. Iceland would be added in 2017. Today, the five nations share a joint ceremony.

== Lists ==
Key
1 Michelin star	One Michelin star
2 Michelin stars	Two Michelin stars
—	The restaurant did not receive a star that year
Closed	The restaurant is no longer open

Michelin-starred restaurants
Name	Cuisine	Location	2022	2023	2024	2025	2026
Boreal	Nordic	Helsinki	—	—	—	—	1 Michelin star
Demo	Modern	Helsinki	1 Michelin star	1 Michelin star	1 Michelin star	1 Michelin star	1 Michelin star
Finnjävel Salonki	Modern	Helsinki	1 Michelin star	1 Michelin star	1 Michelin star	1 Michelin star	1 Michelin star
Grön	Creative	Helsinki	1 Michelin star	1 Michelin star	1 Michelin star	1 Michelin star	2 Michelin stars
Inari	Fusion	Helsinki	1 Michelin star	Closed			
Kaskis	Modern	Turku	1 Michelin star	1 Michelin star	1 Michelin star	1 Michelin star	1 Michelin star
Olo	Contemporary	Helsinki	1 Michelin star	1 Michelin star	1 Michelin star	1 Michelin star	1 Michelin star
Ora	Nordic	Helsinki	1 Michelin star	Closed			
Palace	Contemporary	Helsinki	2 Michelin stars	2 Michelin stars	2 Michelin stars	2 Michelin stars	2 Michelin stars
Tapio	Modern	Ruka	—	—	1 Michelin star	1 Michelin star	Closed
The ROOM by Kozeen Shiwan	Creative	Helsinki	—	—	1 Michelin star	1 Michelin star	Closed
VÅR	Modern	Porvoo	—	1 Michelin star	1 Michelin star	1 Michelin star	1 Michelin star
Reference							

== See also ==
- List of Michelin-starred restaurants in Denmark
- List of Michelin-starred restaurants in Iceland
- List of Michelin-starred restaurants in Norway
- List of Michelin-starred restaurants in Sweden
- Lists of restaurants

== Bibliography ==
- Michelin Guide Nordic Countries 2015. Michelin Travel Publications. 2015. ISBN 978-2-06-719872-2.
- Michelin Guide Nordic Countries 2016. Michelin Travel Publications. 2016. ISBN 978-2-06-720647-2.
- Michelin Guide Nordic Countries 2017. Michelin Travel Publications. 2017. ISBN 978-2-06-721502-3.
- Michelin Guide Nordic Countries 2018. Michelin Travel Publications. 2018. ISBN 978-2-06-722464-3.
- Michelin Guide Nordic Countries 2019. Michelin Travel Publications. 2019. ISBN 978-2-06-723531-1.
- Michelin Guide Nordic Countries 2020. Michelin Travel Publications. 2020. ISBN 978-2-06-724239-5.
