= List of Michelin-starred restaurants in Sweden =

As of the 2026 Michelin Guide, there are 23 restaurants in Sweden with a Michelin-star rating, a rating system used by the Michelin Guide to grade restaurants based on their quality.

Prior to 2014, major cities from Denmark, Finland, Norway, and Sweden were covered in the Michelin Guide Main Cities of Europe edition beginning with Copenhagen, Denmark in 1983. Oslo and Stockholm would be added in 1984 and Helsinki in 1987. Gothenburg would be added in 1990. Beginning in 2014, Denmark, Finland, Norway, and Sweden began being grouped together in The Michelin Guide Nordic Countries. Iceland would be added in 2017. Today, the five nations share a joint ceremony.

== List ==
Key
1 Michelin star	One Michelin star
2 Michelin stars	Two Michelin stars
3 Michelin stars	Three Michelin stars
—	The restaurant did not receive a star that year
Closed	The restaurant is no longer open

Michelin-starred restaurants
Name	Cuisine	Location	Province	2022	2023	2024	2025	2026
28+	French	Gothenburg	Västergötland	1 Michelin star	1 Michelin star	1 Michelin star	1 Michelin star	1 Michelin star
Adam / Albin	Contemporary	Stockholm	Uppland	1 Michelin star	1 Michelin star	1 Michelin star	1 Michelin star	1 Michelin star
Agrikultur	Nordic	Stockholm	Uppland	1 Michelin star	Closed			
AIRA	Nordic	Stockholm	Uppland	1 Michelin star	2 Michelin stars	2 Michelin stars	2 Michelin stars	2 Michelin stars
Aloë	Contemporary	Älvsjö	Södermanland	2 Michelin stars	2 Michelin stars	2 Michelin stars	2 Michelin stars	Closed
ÄNG	Contemporary	Tvååker	Halland	1 Michelin star	1 Michelin star	1 Michelin star	1 Michelin star	1 Michelin star
bhoga	Nordic	Gothenburg	Västergötland	1 Michelin star	—	Closed		
Celeste	Contemporary	Stockholm	Södermanland	—	—	1 Michelin star	1 Michelin star	1 Michelin star
Dashi	Japanese	Stockholm	Uppland	—	—	1 Michelin star	1 Michelin star	1 Michelin star
Ekstedt	Nordic	Stockholm	Uppland	1 Michelin star	1 Michelin star	1 Michelin star	1 Michelin star	1 Michelin star
ergo.	Modern	Stockholm	Uppland	—	—	—	1 Michelin star	1 Michelin star
Etoile	Contemporary	Stockholm	Uppland	1 Michelin star	1 Michelin star	1 Michelin star	1 Michelin star	1 Michelin star
Frantzén	Contemporary	Stockholm	Uppland	3 Michelin stars	3 Michelin stars	3 Michelin stars	3 Michelin stars	3 Michelin stars
Gastrologik	Nordic	Stockholm	Uppland	2 Michelin stars	Closed			
HOZE	Japanese	Gothenburg	Västergötland	—	—	—	1 Michelin star	1 Michelin star
Knystaforsen	Contemporary	Rydöbruk	Halland	1 Michelin star	1 Michelin star	1 Michelin star	1 Michelin star	1 Michelin star
Koka	Contemporary	Gothenburg	Västergötland	1 Michelin star	1 Michelin star	1 Michelin star	1 Michelin star	1 Michelin star
Nour	Fusion	Stockholm	Uppland	1 Michelin star	1 Michelin star	1 Michelin star	1 Michelin star	1 Michelin star
Oaxen Krog	Nordic	Stockholm	Uppland	2 Michelin stars	Closed			
Operakällaren	French	Stockholm	Uppland	1 Michelin star	1 Michelin star	1 Michelin star	1 Michelin star	1 Michelin star
PM & Vänner	Contemporary	Växjö	Småland	1 Michelin star	1 Michelin star	1 Michelin star	1 Michelin star	1 Michelin star
Project	Fusion	Gothenburg	Västergötland	1 Michelin star	1 Michelin star	1 Michelin star	1 Michelin star	1 Michelin star
Seafood Gastro	Seafood	Stockholm	Uppland	—	—	1 Michelin star	1 Michelin star	1 Michelin star
Signum	Seafood	Mölnlycke	Västergötland	—	1 Michelin star	1 Michelin star	2 Michelin stars	2 Michelin stars
SK Mat & Människor	Contemporary	Gothenburg	Västergötland	1 Michelin star	1 Michelin star	1 Michelin star	1 Michelin star	1 Michelin star
Sushi Sho	Japanese	Stockholm	Uppland	1 Michelin star	1 Michelin star	1 Michelin star	1 Michelin star	1 Michelin star
Vollmers	Contemporary	Malmö	Scania	2 Michelin stars	2 Michelin stars	2 Michelin stars	2 Michelin stars	2 Michelin stars
VYN	Contemporary	Simrishamn	Scania	—	1 Michelin star	2 Michelin stars	2 Michelin stars	2 Michelin stars
Reference								

== See also ==
- List of Michelin-starred restaurants in Denmark
- List of Michelin-starred restaurants in Finland
- List of Michelin-starred restaurants in Iceland
- List of Michelin-starred restaurants in Norway
- Lists of restaurants

== Bibliography ==
- Michelin Guide Nordic Countries 2015. Michelin Travel Publications. 2015. ISBN 978-2-06-719872-2.
- Michelin Guide Nordic Countries 2016. Michelin Travel Publications. 2016. ISBN 978-2-06-720647-2.
- Michelin Guide Nordic Countries 2017. Michelin Travel Publications. 2017. ISBN 978-2-06-721502-3.
- Michelin Guide Nordic Countries 2018. Michelin Travel Publications. 2018. ISBN 978-2-06-722464-3.
- Michelin Guide Nordic Countries 2019. Michelin Travel Publications. 2019. ISBN 978-2-06-723531-1.
- Michelin Guide Nordic Countries 2020. Michelin Travel Publications. 2020. ISBN 978-2-06-724239-5.
