= List of Michelin-starred restaurants in Denmark =

As of the 2026 Michelin Guide, there are 42 restaurants in Denmark with a Michelin-star rating, a rating system used by the Michelin Guide to grade restaurants based on their quality.

Prior to 2014, major cities from Denmark, Finland, Norway, and Sweden were covered in the Michelin Guide Main Cities of Europe edition beginning with Copenhagen, Denmark in 1983. Oslo and Stockholm would be added in 1984 and Helsinki in 1987. Gothenburg would be added in 1990. Beginning in 2014, Denmark, Finland, Norway, and Sweden began being grouped together in The Michelin Guide Nordic Countries. Iceland would be added in 2017. Today, the five nations share a joint ceremony.

== Lists ==
Key
1 Michelin star	One Michelin star
2 Michelin stars	Two Michelin stars
3 Michelin stars	Three Michelin stars
—	The restaurant did not receive a star that year
Closed	The restaurant is no longer open

Michelin-starred restaurants
Name	Cuisine	Location	2022	2023	2024	2025	2026
a|o|c	Contemporary	Copenhagen	2 Michelin stars	2 Michelin stars	2 Michelin stars	2 Michelin stars	2 Michelin stars
Akmē	Japanese	Copenhagen	—	—	—	—	1 Michelin star
Alchemist	Contemporary	Copenhagen	2 Michelin stars	2 Michelin stars	2 Michelin stars	2 Michelin stars	2 Michelin stars
Alimentum	Modern	Aalborg	—	—	—	1 Michelin star	1 Michelin star
Alouette	Contemporary	Copenhagen	1 Michelin star	1 Michelin star	1 Michelin star	1 Michelin star	1 Michelin star
ARO	Contemporary	Odense	—	1 Michelin star	1 Michelin star	1 Michelin star	1 Michelin star
Bach & Nurup	Creative	Aalborg	—	—	—	—	1 Michelin star
Domæne	Contemporary	Herning	—	1 Michelin star	1 Michelin star	1 Michelin star	1 Michelin star
Domestic	Contemporary	Aarhus	1 Michelin star	1 Michelin star	1 Michelin star	1 Michelin star	1 Michelin star
Dragsholm Slot Gourmet	Contemporary	Hørve	1 Michelin star	1 Michelin star	1 Michelin star	1 Michelin star	1 Michelin star
Esse	Creative	Nordhavn	—	—	—	—	1 Michelin star
formel B	Contemporary	Copenhagen	1 Michelin star	1 Michelin star	1 Michelin star	1 Michelin star	1 Michelin star
Frederikshøj	Contemporary	Aarhus	2 Michelin stars	2 Michelin stars	2 Michelin stars	2 Michelin stars	2 Michelin stars
Hotel Frederiksminde	Contemporary	Præstø	1 Michelin star	1 Michelin star	1 Michelin star	1 Michelin star	1 Michelin star
Gastromé	Contemporary	Aarhus	1 Michelin star	1 Michelin star	1 Michelin star	1 Michelin star	1 Michelin star
Geranium	Contemporary	Copenhagen	3 Michelin stars	3 Michelin stars	3 Michelin stars	3 Michelin stars	3 Michelin stars
Grand Royal (Note: Was named Me|Mu until 2022)	Contemporary	Vejle	1 Michelin star	1 Michelin star	Closed		
Henne Kirkeby Kro	Nordic	Henne Kirkeby	2 Michelin stars	2 Michelin stars	2 Michelin stars	2 Michelin stars	2 Michelin stars
Jatak	Contemporary	Copenhagen	1 Michelin star	1 Michelin star	1 Michelin star	1 Michelin star	1 Michelin star
Jordnær	Contemporary	Gentofte	2 Michelin stars	2 Michelin stars	3 Michelin stars	3 Michelin stars	3 Michelin stars
Kadeau Bornholm	Contemporary	Åkirkeby	1 Michelin star	1 Michelin star	1 Michelin star	1 Michelin star	1 Michelin star
Kadeau Copenhagen	Contemporary	Copenhagen	2 Michelin stars	2 Michelin stars	2 Michelin stars	2 Michelin stars	3 Michelin stars
Kiin Kiin	Thai	Copenhagen	1 Michelin star	—	—	—	—
Koan	Contemporary	Copenhagen	—	2 Michelin stars	2 Michelin stars	2 Michelin stars	2 Michelin stars
Kokkeriet	Contemporary	Copenhagen	1 Michelin star	—	—	Closed	
KOKS	Nordic	Faroe Islands (Note: Temporarily relocated to Greenland)	2 Michelin stars	—	—	Temporarily closed	
Kong Hans Kælder	French	Copenhagen	2 Michelin stars	2 Michelin stars	2 Michelin stars	2 Michelin stars	2 Michelin stars
Lille Mølle	Modern	Copenhagen	—	—	—	—	1 Michelin star
LYST	Contemporary	Vejle	1 Michelin star	1 Michelin star	1 Michelin star	1 Michelin star	1 Michelin star
Marchal	French	Copenhagen	1 Michelin star	1 Michelin star	1 Michelin star	1 Michelin star	1 Michelin star
MOTA	Contemporary	Nykøbing Sjælland	1 Michelin star	1 Michelin star	1 Michelin star	1 Michelin star	1 Michelin star
noma	Nordic	Copenhagen	3 Michelin stars	3 Michelin stars	3 Michelin stars	—	—
Okê	Modern	Skagen	—	—	—	—	1 Michelin star
Parsley Salon	Modern	Hellerup	—	—	—	1 Michelin star	1 Michelin star
PAZ	Creative	Tórshavn	—	—	—	2 Michelin stars	2 Michelin stars
Pearl by Paul Proffitt	Modern	Kruså	—	—	—	1 Michelin star	1 Michelin star
Restaurant Aure	Contemporary	Copenhagen	—	—	1 Michelin star	1 Michelin star	1 Michelin star
Søllerød Kro	Contemporary	Copenhagen	1 Michelin star	1 Michelin star	1 Michelin star	1 Michelin star	1 Michelin star
Substans	Contemporary	Aarhus	1 Michelin star	1 Michelin star	1 Michelin star	1 Michelin star	1 Michelin star
Sushi Anaba	Japanese	Copenhagen	—	—	—	1 Michelin star	1 Michelin star
Syttende	Nordic	Sønderborg	1 Michelin star	1 Michelin star	1 Michelin star	1 Michelin star	1 Michelin star
texture	Modern	Copenhagen	—	—	—	1 Michelin star	1 Michelin star
The Samuel	Contemporary	Copenhagen	1 Michelin star	1 Michelin star	1 Michelin star	1 Michelin star	1 Michelin star
Ti Trin Ned	Contemporary	Fredericia	1 Michelin star	1 Michelin star	1 Michelin star	1 Michelin star	1 Michelin star
Tri	Contemporary	Agger	—	1 Michelin star	1 Michelin star	1 Michelin star	1 Michelin star
Udtryk	Creative	Copenhagen	—	—	—	1 Michelin star	1 Michelin star
Villa Vest	Contemporary	Lønstrup	—	1 Michelin star	1 Michelin star	1 Michelin star	1 Michelin star
Reference							

== See also ==
- List of Michelin-starred restaurants in Finland
- List of Michelin-starred restaurants in Iceland
- List of Michelin-starred restaurants in Norway
- List of Michelin-starred restaurants in Sweden
- Lists of restaurants

== Bibliography ==
- Michelin Guide Nordic Countries 2015. Michelin Travel Publications. 2015. ISBN 978-2-06-719872-2.
- Michelin Guide Nordic Countries 2016. Michelin Travel Publications. 2016. ISBN 978-2-06-720647-2.
- Michelin Guide Nordic Countries 2017. Michelin Travel Publications. 2017. ISBN 978-2-06-721502-3.
- Michelin Guide Nordic Countries 2018. Michelin Travel Publications. 2018. ISBN 978-2-06-722464-3.
- Michelin Guide Nordic Countries 2019. Michelin Travel Publications. 2019. ISBN 978-2-06-723531-1.
- Michelin Guide Nordic Countries 2020. Michelin Travel Publications. 2020. ISBN 978-2-06-724239-5.
