= List of Michelin-starred restaurants in Norway =

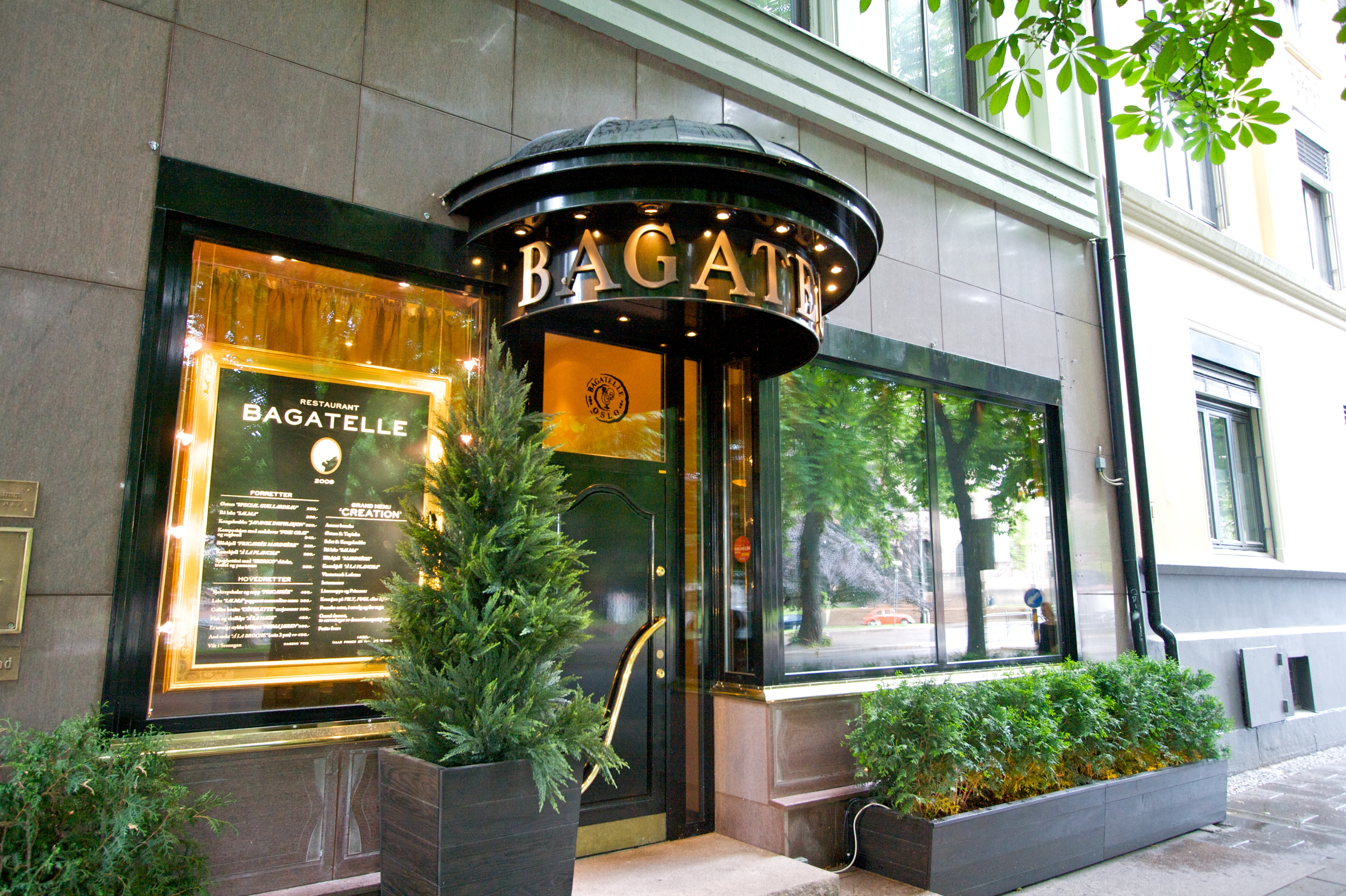
Bagatelle

As of the 2026 guide, there are 23 restaurants in Norway with a Michelin-star rating, a rating system used by the Michelin Guide to grade restaurants based on their quality.

Prior to 2014, major cities from Denmark, Finland, Norway, and Sweden were covered in the Michelin Guide Main Cities of Europe edition beginning with Copenhagen, Denmark in 1983. Oslo and Stockholm would be added in 1984 and Helsinki in 1987. Gothenburg would be added in 1990. Beginning in 2014, Denmark, Finland, Norway, and Sweden began being grouped together in The Michelin Guide Nordic Countries. Iceland would be added in 2017. Today, the five nations share a joint ceremony.

== List ==
Key
1 Michelin star	One Michelin star
2 Michelin stars	Two Michelin stars
3 Michelin stars	Three Michelin stars
—	The restaurant did not receive a star that year
Closed	The restaurant is no longer open

Michelin-starred restaurants
Name	Cuisine	Location	2022	2023	2024	2025	2026
À L’aise	French	Oslo	—	1 Michelin star	1 Michelin star	1 Michelin star	1 Michelin star
Bar Amour	Portuguese	Oslo	—	—	1 Michelin star	1 Michelin star	1 Michelin star
Bare	Japanese	Bergen	1 Michelin star	—	—	—	—
Credo	Creative	Oslo	—	—	—	—	1 Michelin star
FAGN	Contemporary	Trondheim	1 Michelin star	1 Michelin star	1 Michelin star	1 Michelin star	1 Michelin star
Gaptrast	Nordic	Bergen	—	—	—	1 Michelin star	2 Michelin stars
Hermetikken	Contemporary	Stavanger	—	—	1 Michelin star	1 Michelin star	1 Michelin star
Hot Shop	Contemporary	Oslo	1 Michelin star	1 Michelin star	1 Michelin star	1 Michelin star	1 Michelin star
HYDE	Modern	Oslo	1 Michelin star	1 Michelin star	1 Michelin star	1 Michelin star	Closed
Iris	Creative	Rosendal	—	—	1 Michelin star	1 Michelin star	Closed
K2	Nordic	Stavanger	—	1 Michelin star	1 Michelin star	1 Michelin star	1 Michelin star
Kontrast	Nordic	Oslo	1 Michelin star	1 Michelin star	2 Michelin stars	2 Michelin stars	2 Michelin stars
Kvitnes Gård	Modern	Kvitnes	—	—	—	—	1 Michelin star
Lysverket	Nordic	Bergen	1 Michelin star	1 Michelin star	1 Michelin star	1 Michelin star	1 Michelin star
Maaemo	Contemporary	Oslo	3 Michelin stars	3 Michelin stars	3 Michelin stars	3 Michelin stars	3 Michelin stars
Mirabelle	Modern	Bekkjarvik	—	—	—	—	1 Michelin star
Mon Oncle	French	Oslo	—	1 Michelin star	1 Michelin star	1 Michelin star	1 Michelin star
Omakase by Sergey Pak	Japanese	Bergen	—	—	—	1 Michelin star	1 Michelin star
RE-NAA	Seafood	Stavanger	2 Michelin stars	2 Michelin stars	3 Michelin stars	3 Michelin stars	3 Michelin stars
Sabi Omakase Stavanger	Japanese	Stavanger	1 Michelin star	1 Michelin star	1 Michelin star	1 Michelin star	1 Michelin star
Sabi Omakase Oslo	Japanese	Oslo	—	1 Michelin star	1 Michelin star	1 Michelin star	1 Michelin star
SAVAGE	Contemporary	Oslo	—	1 Michelin star	1 Michelin star	1 Michelin star	1 Michelin star
Schlägergården	Nordic	Oslo	1 Michelin star	Closed			
Speilsalen	Seafood	Trondheim	1 Michelin star	1 Michelin star	1 Michelin star	1 Michelin star	1 Michelin star
Stallen	Nordic	Oslo	—	1 Michelin star	1 Michelin star	1 Michelin star	1 Michelin star
Statholdergaarden	Nordic	Oslo	1 Michelin star	1 Michelin star	1 Michelin star	1 Michelin star	1 Michelin star
Under	Contemporary	Lindesnes	1 Michelin star	1 Michelin star	1 Michelin star	1 Michelin star	1 Michelin star
Reference							

== See also ==
- List of Michelin-starred restaurants in Denmark
- List of Michelin-starred restaurants in Finland
- List of Michelin-starred restaurants in Iceland
- List of Michelin-starred restaurants in Sweden
- Lists of restaurants

== Bibliography ==
- Michelin Guide Nordic Countries 2015. Michelin Travel Publications. 2015. ISBN 978-2-06-719872-2.
- Michelin Guide Nordic Countries 2016. Michelin Travel Publications. 2016. ISBN 978-2-06-720647-2.
- Michelin Guide Nordic Countries 2017. Michelin Travel Publications. 2017. ISBN 978-2-06-721502-3.
- Michelin Guide Nordic Countries 2018. Michelin Travel Publications. 2018. ISBN 978-2-06-722464-3.
- Michelin Guide Nordic Countries 2019. Michelin Travel Publications. 2019. ISBN 978-2-06-723531-1.
- Michelin Guide Nordic Countries 2020. Michelin Travel Publications. 2020. ISBN 978-2-06-724239-5.
