= List of Michelin-starred restaurants in Iceland =

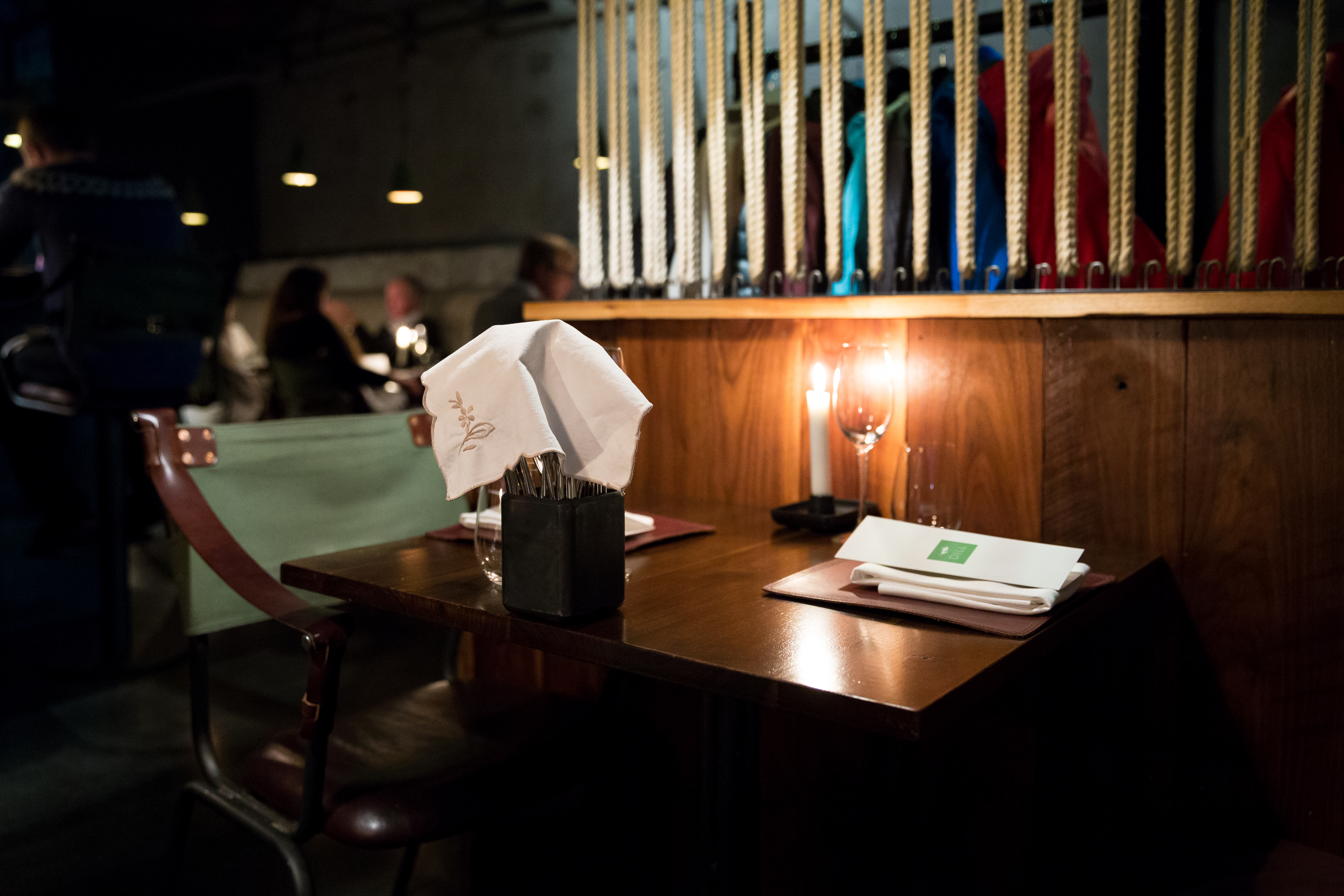
The interior of Dili, Iceland's first Michelin-starred restaurant.

As of the 2026 Michelin Guide, there are 3 restaurants in Iceland with a Michelin-star rating. The Michelin Guides have been published by the French tire company Michelin since 1900. They were designed as a guide to tell drivers about eateries they recommended to visit and to subtly sponsor their tires, by encouraging drivers to use their cars more and therefore need to replace the tires as they wore out. Over time, the stars that were given out became more valuable.

Although Iceland has traditional cuisine of meat and fish, the city's New Nordic food scene has begun to grow. Iceland has become a dining destination driven by New Nordic Cuisine with multiple Michelin-starred restaurants.

Beginning in 2014, Denmark, Finland, Norway, and Sweden began being grouped together in The Michelin Guide Nordic Countries. Iceland would be added to the guide in 2017. Today, the five nations share a joint ceremony.

Multiple anonymous Michelin inspectors visit the restaurants several times. They rate the restaurants on five criteria: "quality of products", "mastery of flavor and cooking techniques", "the personality of the chef represented in the dining experience", "value for money", and "consistency between inspectors' visits". Inspectors have at least ten years of expertise and create a list of popular restaurants supported by media reports, reviews, and diner popularity. If they reach a consensus, Michelin awards restaurants from one to three stars based on its evaluation methodology: one star means "high-quality cooking, worth a stop", two stars signify "excellent cooking, worth a detour", and three stars denote "exceptional cuisine, worth a special journey". The stars are not permanent, and restaurants are constantly re-evaluated. If the criteria are not met, the restaurant will lose its stars.

== Lists ==
Key
1 Michelin star	One Michelin star
—	The restaurant did not receive a star that year

Michelin-starred restaurants
Name	Cuisine	Location	2017	2018	2019	2020	2021	2022	2023	2024	2025	2026
DILL	Contemporary	Reykjavík	1 Michelin star	1 Michelin star	—	1 Michelin star	1 Michelin star	1 Michelin star	1 Michelin star	1 Michelin star	1 Michelin star	1 Michelin star
Moss	Nordic	Grindavík	—	—	—	—	—	—	1 Michelin star	1 Michelin star	1 Michelin star	1 Michelin star
ÓX	Contemporary	Reykjavík	—	—	—	—	—	1 Michelin star	1 Michelin star	1 Michelin star	1 Michelin star	1 Michelin star
Reference												

== See also ==
- List of Michelin-starred restaurants in Denmark
- List of Michelin-starred restaurants in Finland
- List of Michelin-starred restaurants in Norway
- List of Michelin-starred restaurants in Sweden
- Lists of restaurants

== Bibliography ==
- Michelin Guide Nordic Countries 2017. Michelin Travel Publications. 2017. ISBN 978-2-06-721502-3.
- Michelin Guide Nordic Countries 2018. Michelin Travel Publications. 2018. ISBN 978-2-06-722464-3.
- Michelin Guide Nordic Countries 2019. Michelin Travel Publications. 2019. ISBN 978-2-06-723531-1.
- Michelin Guide Nordic Countries 2020. Michelin Travel Publications. 2020. ISBN 978-2-06-724239-5.
