= List of European cuisines =

Common dishes throughout Europe

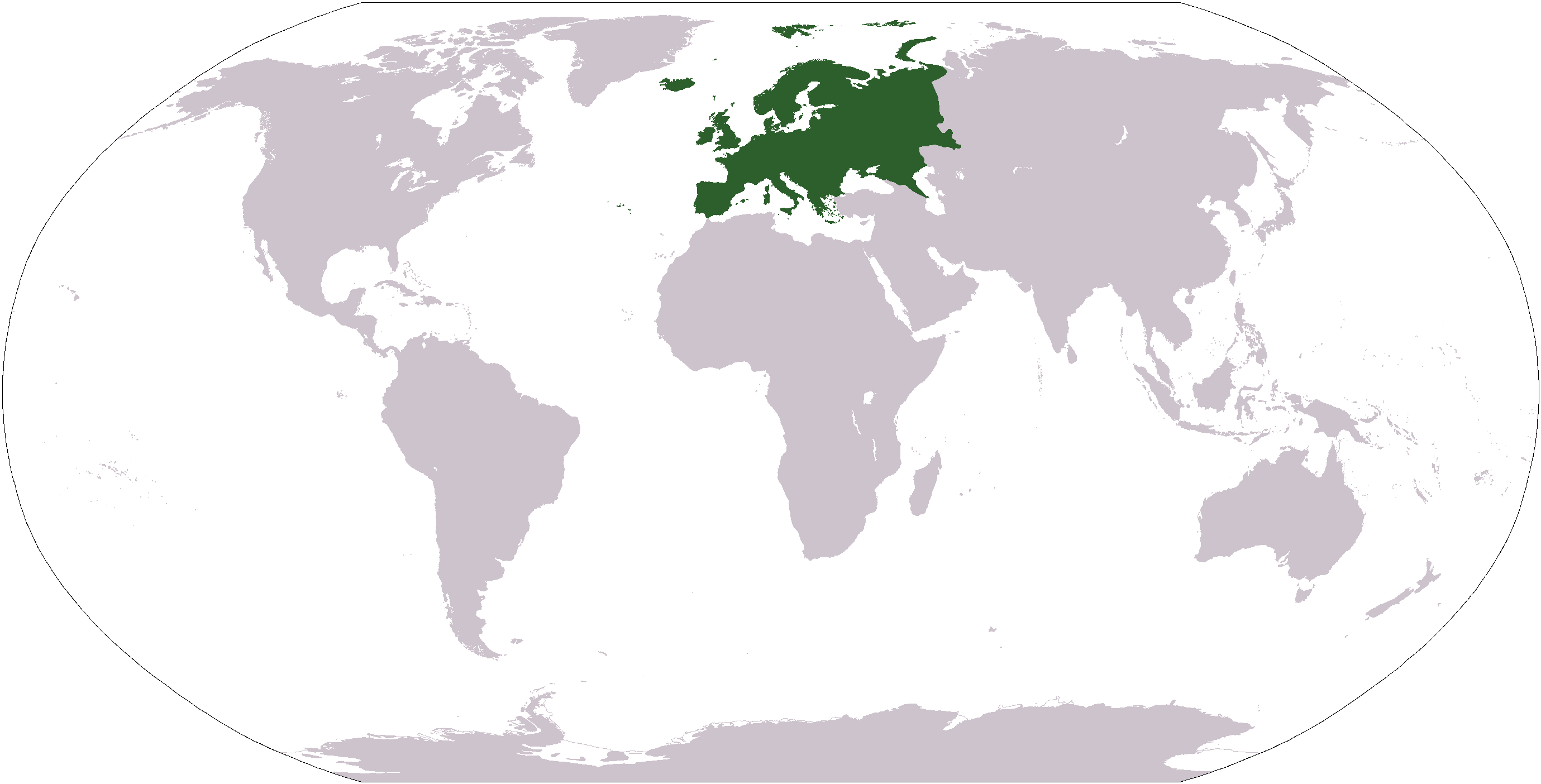

This is a list of European cuisines. A cuisine is a characteristic style of cooking practices and traditions, often associated with a specific culture. European cuisine refers collectively to the cuisines of Europe.

The cuisines of European countries are diverse by themselves, although there are common characteristics that distinguishes European cooking from cuisines of Asian countries and others. Compared with traditional cooking of Asian countries, for example, meat is more prominent and substantial in serving-size. Wheat-flour bread has long been the most common sources of starch in this cuisine, along with pasta, dumplings and pastries, although the potato has become a major starch plant in the diet of Europeans and their diaspora since the European colonization of the Americas.

== Southern European cuisines ==
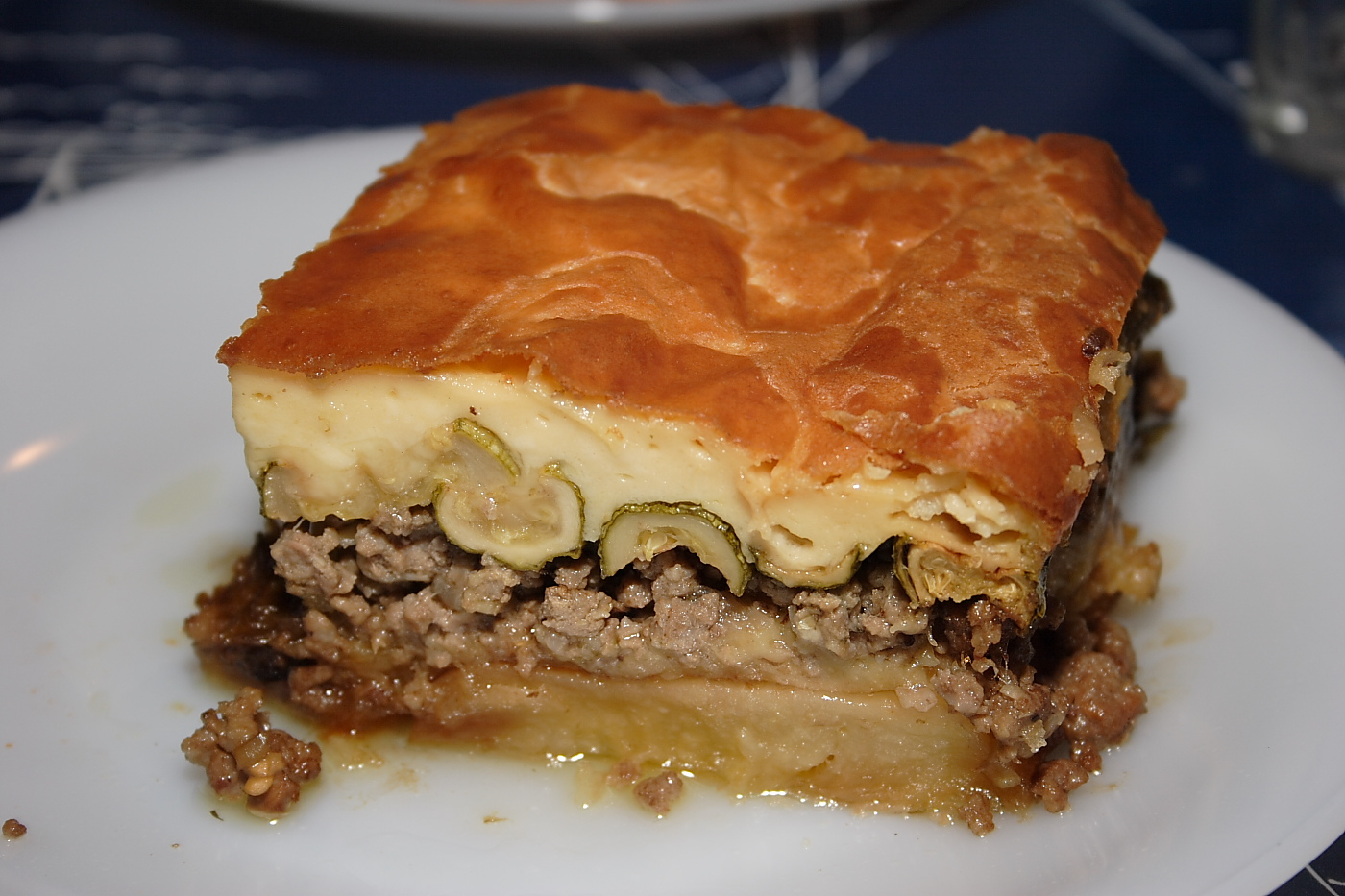
Moussaka is an eggplant or potato-based dish popular in Mediterranean cuisine. Several variations exist.

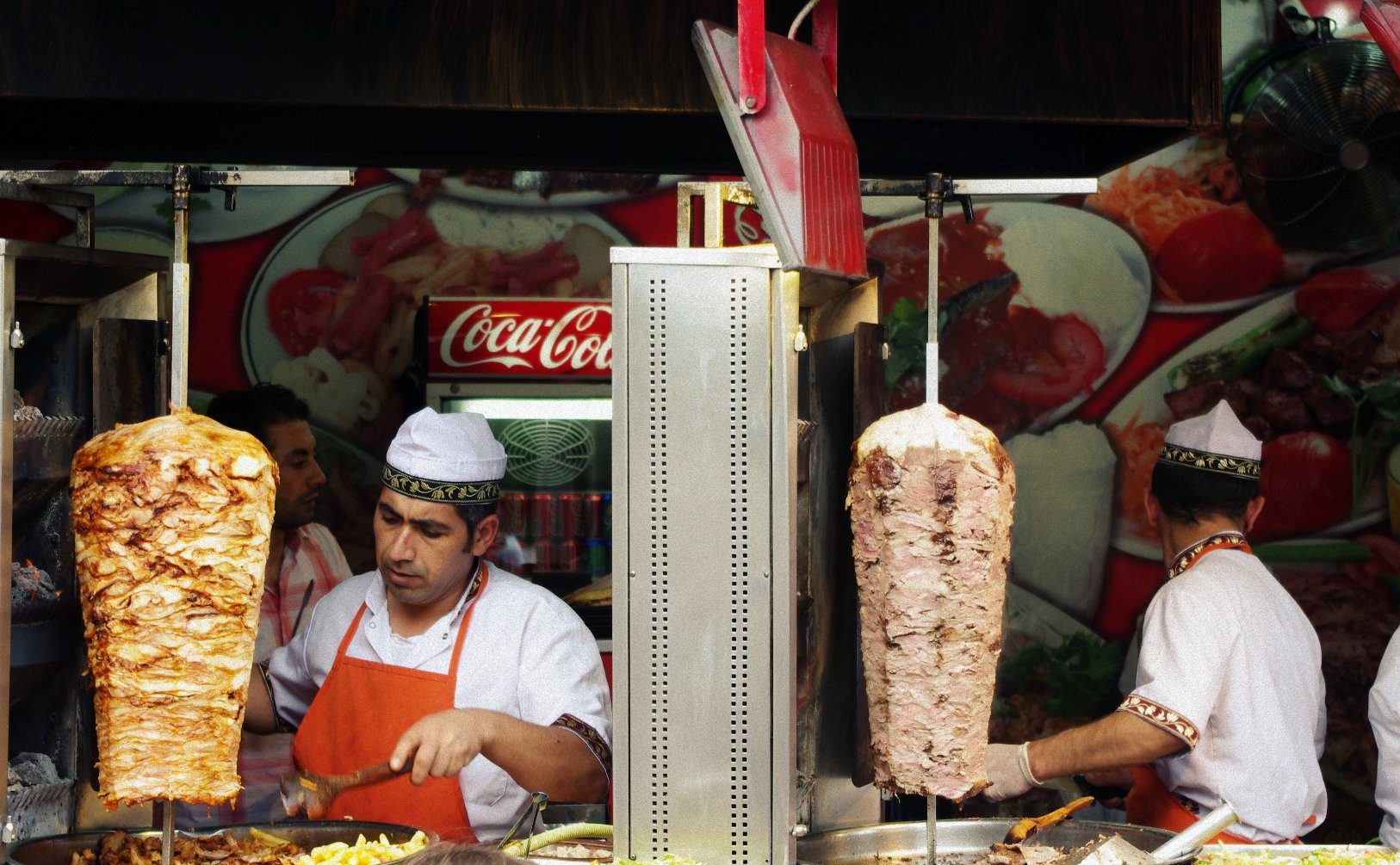
Doner kebab on rotisseries in Istanbul

- Cuisines of the Iberian Peninsula

- Gibraltarian cuisine
- Portuguese cuisine

- Portuguese wine

- Port wine

- Spanish cuisine has a variety of dishes including thousands of recipes and flavors arising from Spain's extensive history with many cultural influences, and variations in geography and climate. It is heavily influenced by seafood available from the waters that surround the country, and reflects the country's deep maritime roots. Spanish wine is a significant part of Spanish cuisine. Regional Spanish cuisines include:

- Andalusian cuisine
- Asturian cuisine
- Aragonese cuisine
- Balearic cuisine
- Basque cuisine
- Canarian cuisine
- Cantabrian cuisine
- Castilian-Leonese cuisine
- Castilian-Manchego cuisine
- Cuisine of the Community of Madrid
- Catalan cuisine (includes Andorran cuisine)
- Extremaduran cuisine
- Galician cuisine
- Leonese cuisine
- Valencian cuisine
- Cuisine of Minorca

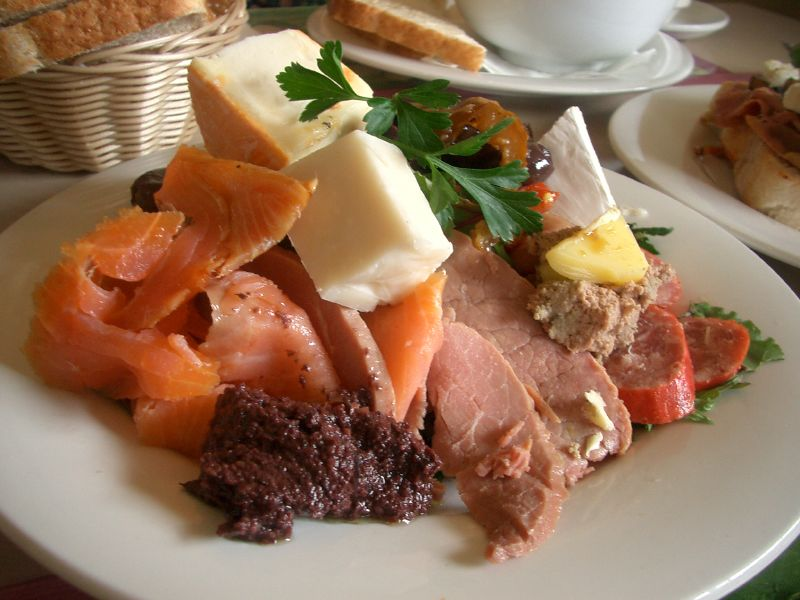
A gourmet antipasto platter

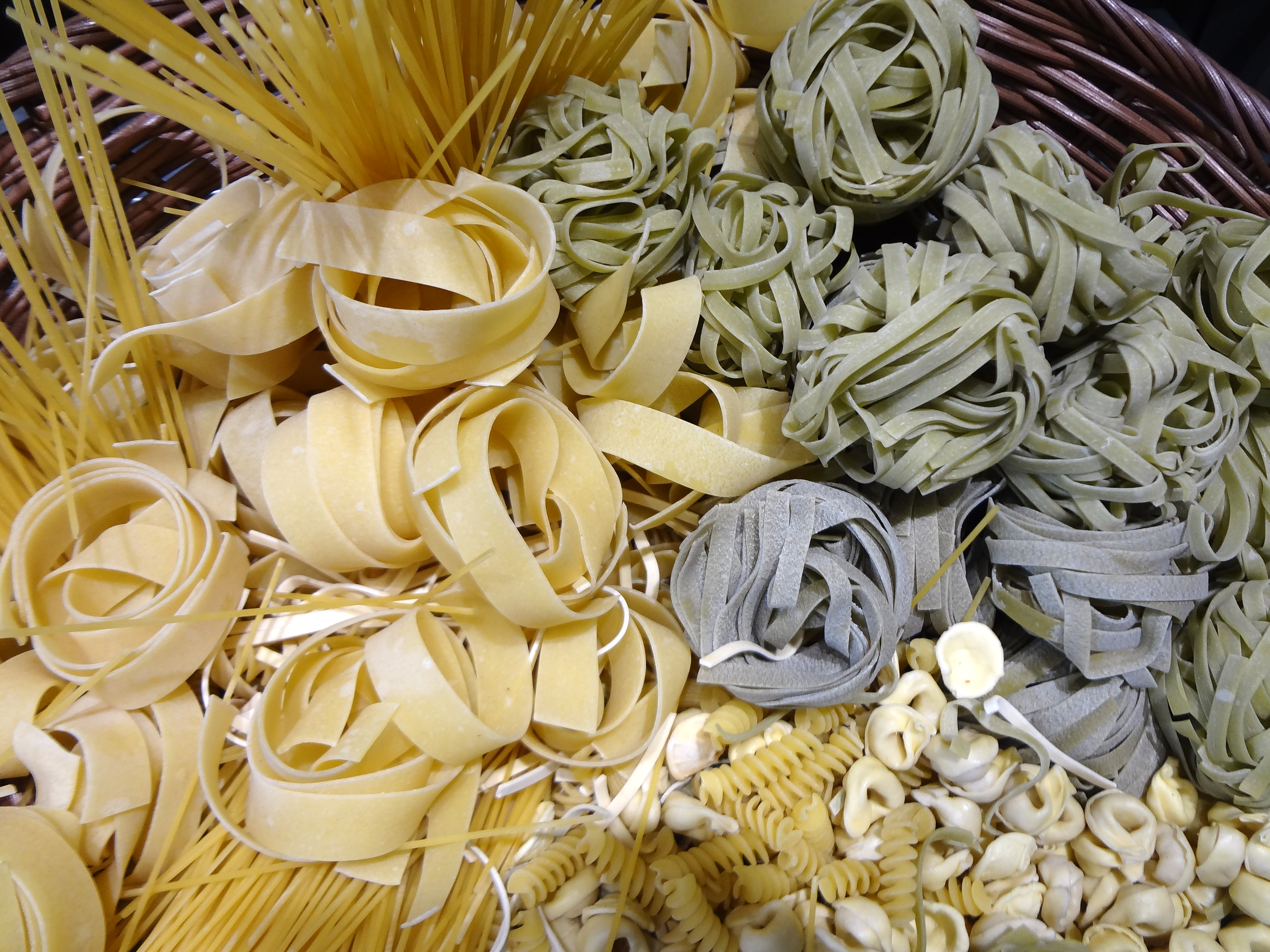
Pasta is a staple food of Italy.

- Cuisines of the Italian Peninsula

- Italian cuisine – presents popular dishes like pizza, pasta, lasagne, Mozzarella and other well-known food. Italian cuisine has been influenced by Ancient Greek, Ancient Roman, Etruscan cuisines and dates back to 4th century BCE. It maintains strong regional diversity and it uses a vast variety of ingredients, mostly because of the political divisions in Italian history and different climate and resources in the country. Most of the dishes are simple to prepare and not expensive, which is one of the reason it is very popular around the world.

- Italian wine
- Regional Cuisines – in Italian cuisine, each area has its own specialties, primarily at the regional level, but also at provincial levels. The cuisine has an abundance of differences in taste, and is known to be one of the most popular in the world, with influences abroad. The differences can derive from a bordering country (such as France or Austria), whether a region is close to the sea or the mountains, and economics. Italian cuisine is also seasonal, often incorporating fresh produce. Italian regional cuisines include:

- Abruzzese and Molisan
- Arbëreshë
- Basilicatan or Lucanian
- Calabrian
- Emilia-Romagnan
- Friuli-Venezia Giulian
- Lazian or Roman
- Ligurian
- Lombard

- Mantuan

- Marche
- Neapolitan cuisine, Campanian
- Piedmontese
- Pugliese
- Sardinian
- Sicilian cuisine
- Trentino-South Tyrolean cuisine
- Tuscan cuisine
- Umbrian
- Valle d'Aostan
- Venetian cuisine

- Maltese cuisine

- Maltese wine

- Sammarinese cuisine

- Mediterranean cuisine

- Mediterranean diet
- Cypriot cuisine is the cuisine of Cyprus and can be described as a blend of Greek and Turkish cuisines. Greek Cypriot cuisine is another regional Greek cuisine along with Cretan, Ionian, or Attic.

- Cypriot wine

- Turkish cuisine is largely the heritage of Ottoman cuisine, which can be described as a fusion and refinement of Central Asian, Middle Eastern, Eastern European, Armenian and Balkan cuisines.

- Turkish wine

- Northern Cypriot cuisine

Southern European foods and dishes

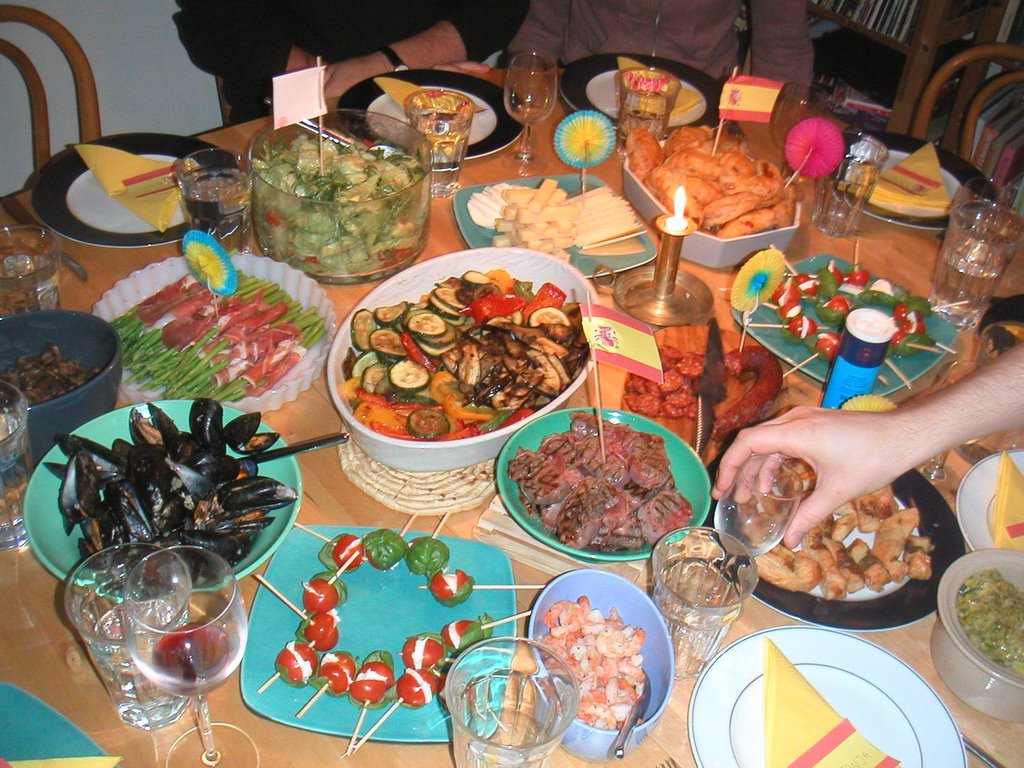
A variety of tapas: appetizers or snacks in Spanish cuisine

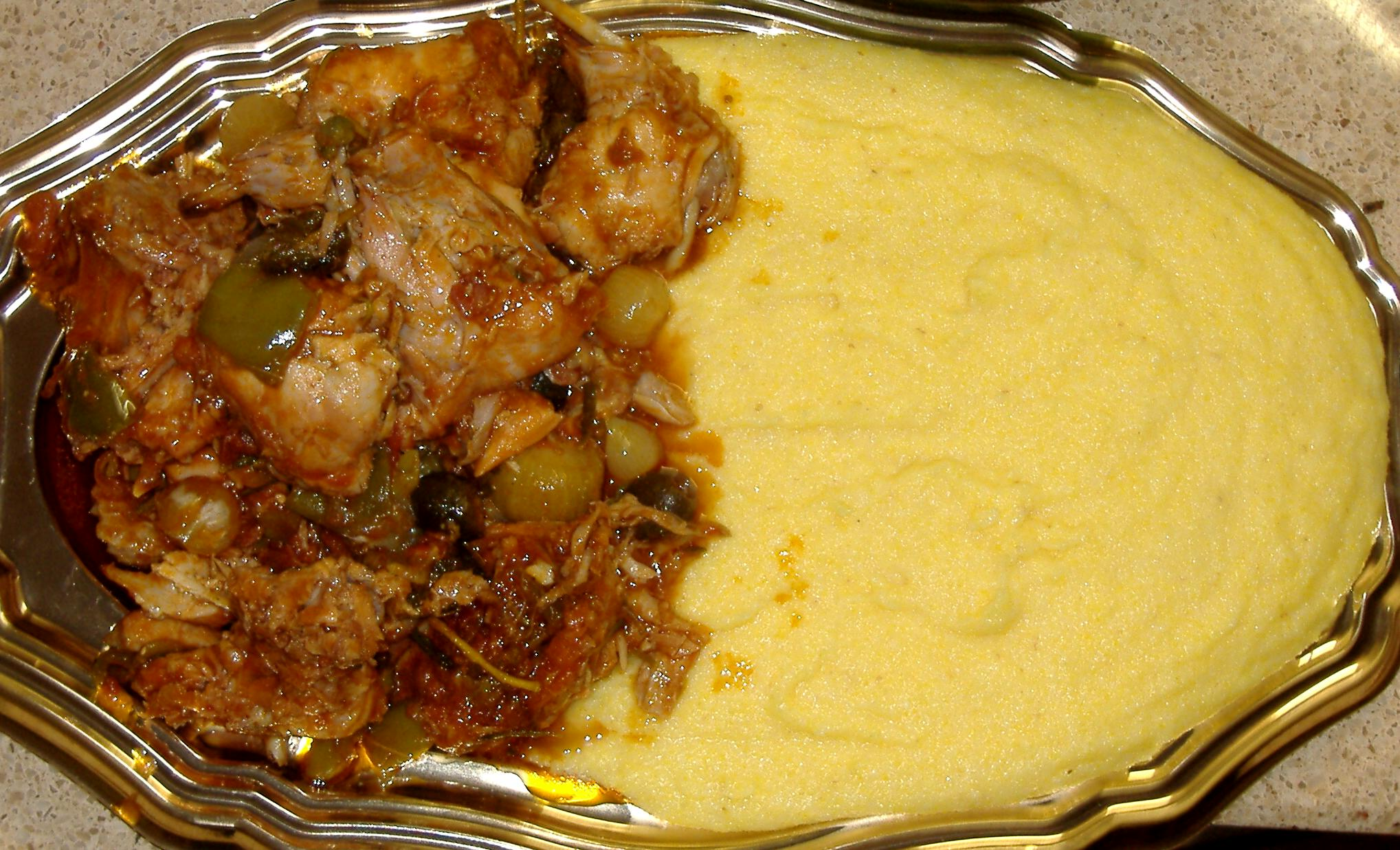
Rabbit meat and polenta, a traditional peasant food of Veneto, Italy

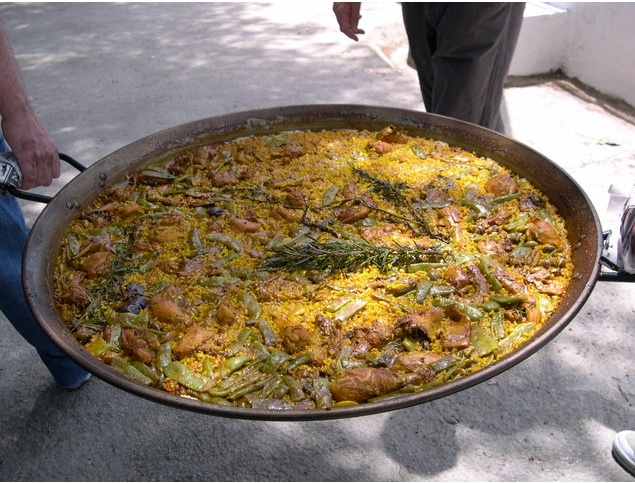
A large paella, a Valencian rice dish

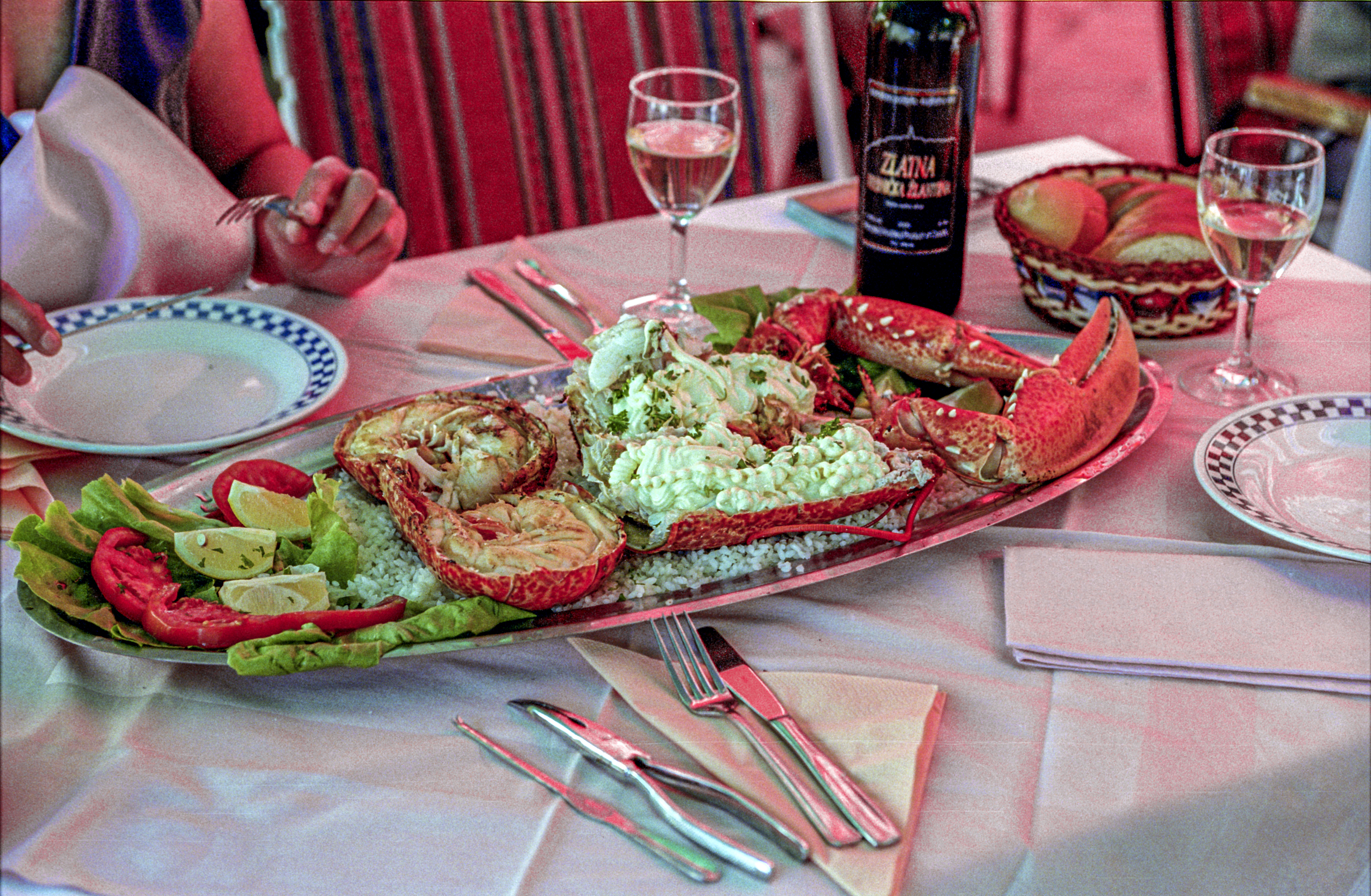
Mediterranean cuisine in Dalmatia, Croatia

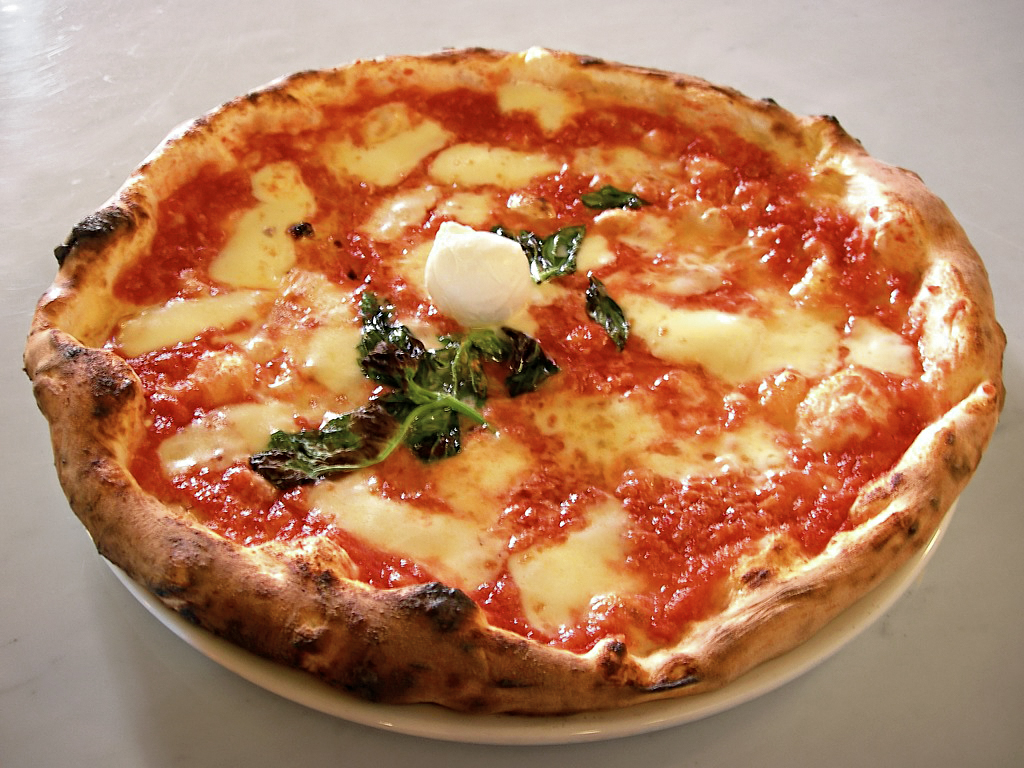
Pizza is a Neapolitan dish and one of the world's most popular fast foods.

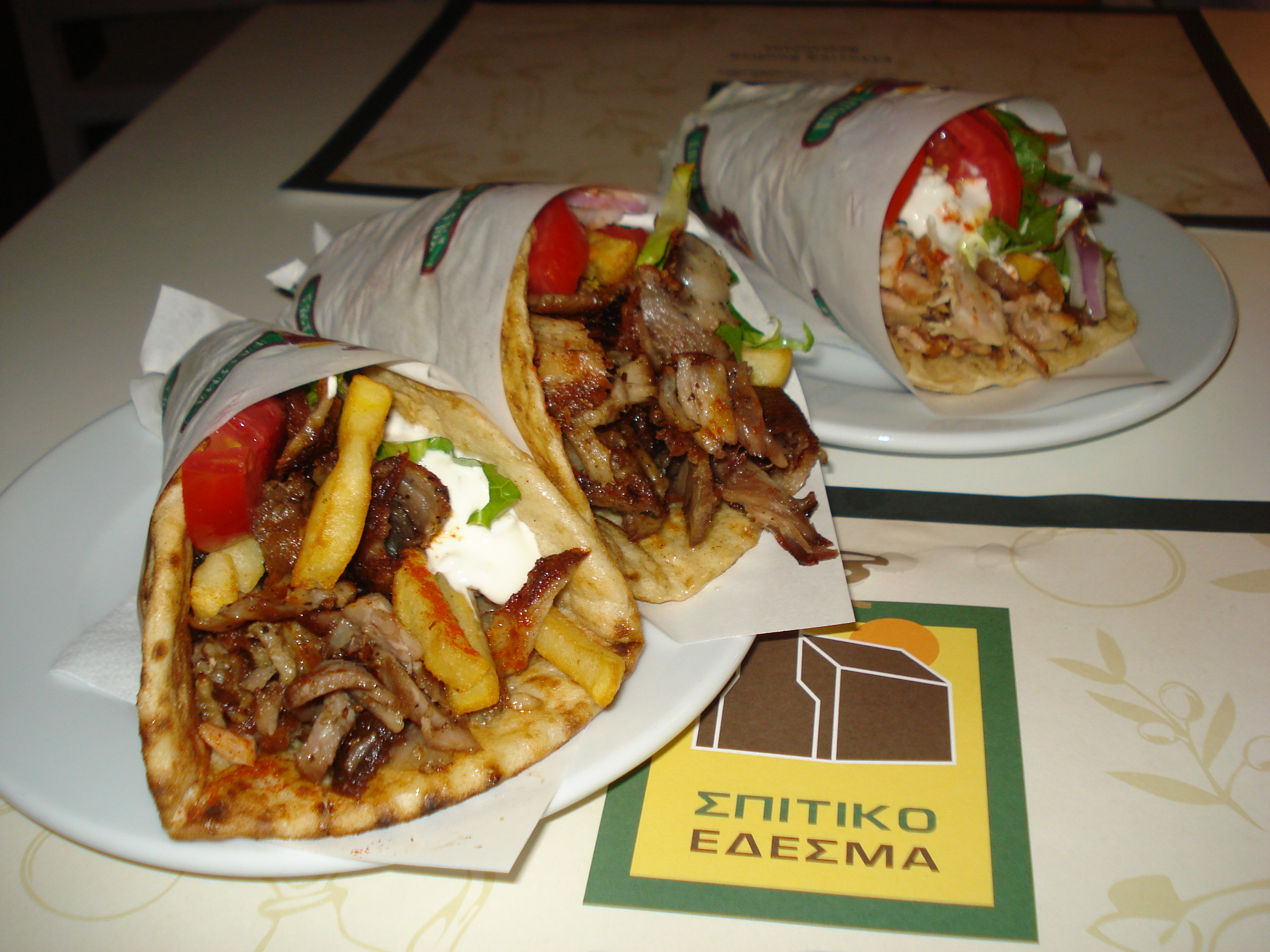
Gyros are a Greek dish of meat cooked on a vertical rotisserie.

== Southeastern European cuisines ==
- Albanian cuisine is uniquely influenced by Turkish, Greek, and Italian cuisines. Every region in Albania has its own unique dishes. Albanian cuisine is characterized by the use of various Mediterranean herbs such as oregano, black pepper, mint, basil, rosemary and more in cooking meat and fish.

- Albanian wine

- Aromanian cuisine
- Bosnian cuisine
- Bulgarian cuisine is essentially South Slavic with Turkish influences, and shares characteristics with other Balkans cuisines. Owing to the relatively warm climate and diverse geography affording excellent growth conditions for a variety of vegetables, herbs and fruits, Bulgarian cuisine is diverse.

- Bulgarian wine

- Croatian cuisine

- Croatian wine
- List of Croatian dishes

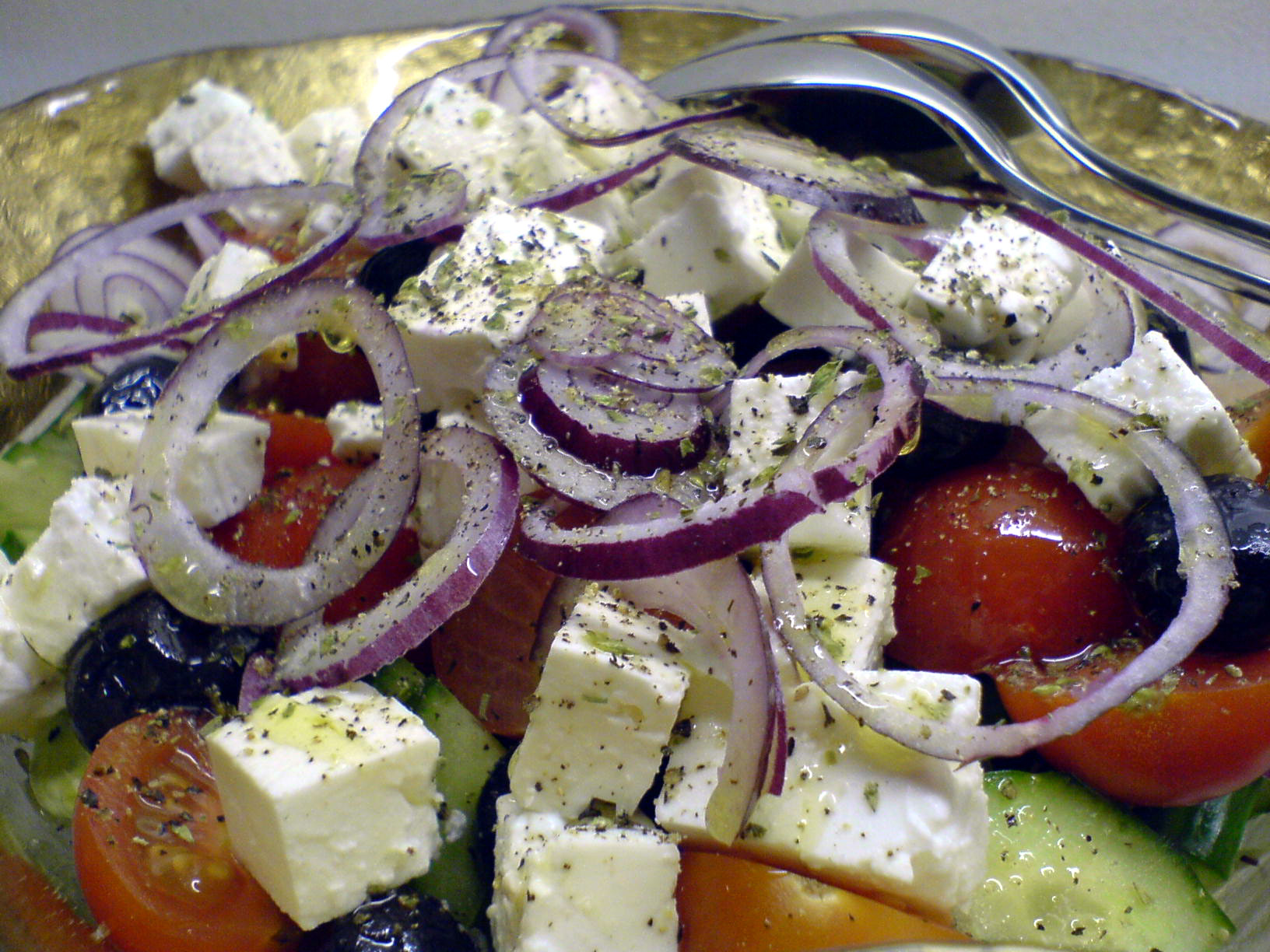
Greek salad

- Greek cuisine

- Greek wine
- Macedonian cuisine (Greek)
- Regional foods

- Taramosalata, a Greek meze made with salted and cured fish roe.

- Hungarian cuisine is primarily based on meats, seasonal vegetables, fruits, and fresh bread. It shares a number of features with Turkish cuisine. Paprika, introduced to Hungary under Ottoman rule, is a staple in Hungarian cuisine. Recipes are based on centuries-old traditions of spicing and preparation methods. Hungarian cuisine features regional dishes such as piláf, pogácsa, paszuly főzelék, szárma and muszaka.

- Hungarian wine
- Goulash

- Kosovan cuisine
- Macedonian cuisine

- Macedonian wine

- Montenegrin cuisine

- Montenegrin wine

- Serbian cuisine

- Serbian wine

- Slovenian cuisine There is a wide variety of meats in different parts of Slovenia. Dandelion is Slovenian wild lettuce, which has been gathered in the fields for centuries. It has notable influences from Croatian cuisine, and other cuisines of the former Yugoslavia.
- Slovenian wine

== Central European cuisines ==
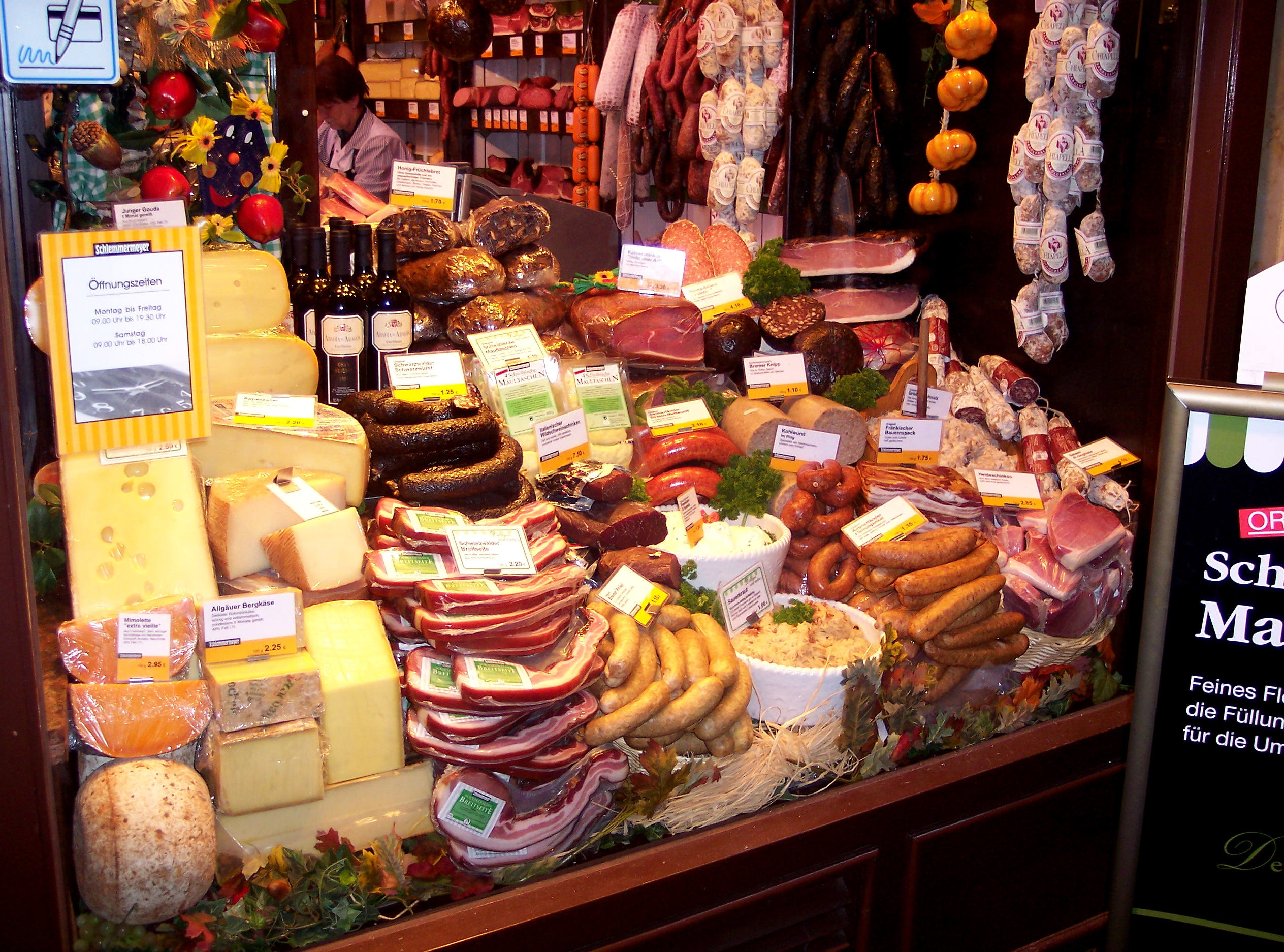
German sausages and cheese

- Austrian cuisine is a style of cuisine native to Austria and composed of influences from throughout the former Habsburg Empire. Regional influences from Italy, Germany and the Balkans have had an effect on Austrian cooking, and in turn this fusion of styles was influential throughout the Empire.

- Austrian wine
- Viennese cuisine

- Czech cuisine has both influenced and been influenced by the cuisines of surrounding countries. Many of the fine cakes and pastries that are popular in Central Europe originated in the Czech lands. Czech cuisine is marked by a strong emphasis on meat dishes. Pork is quite common, and beef and chicken are also popular.

- Czech wine

- German cuisine

- German wine
- Baden cuisine
- Bavarian cuisine
- Berliner cuisine
- Brandenburg cuisine
- Franconian cuisine
- Hamburg cuisine
- Hessian cuisine
- Lower Saxon cuisine
- Mecklenburg cuisine
- Palatine cuisine
- Pomeranian cuisine
- Rhenish-Hessian cuisine
- Saxon cuisine
- Schleswig-Holstein cuisine
- Silesian cuisine
- Swabian cuisine

- Liechtensteiner cuisine

- Liechtenstein wine

- Polish cuisine is the cuisine characteristic of the nation of Poland and its primary ethnic group, the Poles. Traditional Polish dishes are based on meats, vegetables, fruits, breads, cheeses, sausages, milk, etc. The most typical ingredients used in Polish cuisine are sauerkraut, paprika, beetroot, cucumbers (gherkins), sour cream, kohlrabi, mushrooms, sausages and smoked sausage. A meal owes its taste to the herbs and spices used; such as marjoram, dill, caraway seeds, parsley, or pepper. The most popular desserts are cakes and pastries.

- Polish wine
- Pierogi
- Silesian cuisine

- Slovak cuisine varies slightly, though sometimes dramatically, from region to region, and was influenced by the traditional cuisine of its neighbors. The origins of traditional Slovak cuisine can be traced to times when the majority of the population lived in villages, in self-sustenance, with very limited food imports and exports and with no modern means of food preservation or processing. This gave rise to a cuisine heavily dependent on a number of staple foods that could stand the hot summers and cold winters, including wheat, potatoes, milk and milk products, pork meat, sauerkraut and onion. To a lesser degree beef, poultry, lamb and goat, eggs, a few other local vegetables, fruit and wild mushrooms were traditionally eaten.

- Slovak wine

- Swiss cuisine

- Swiss wine

Central European foods and dishes

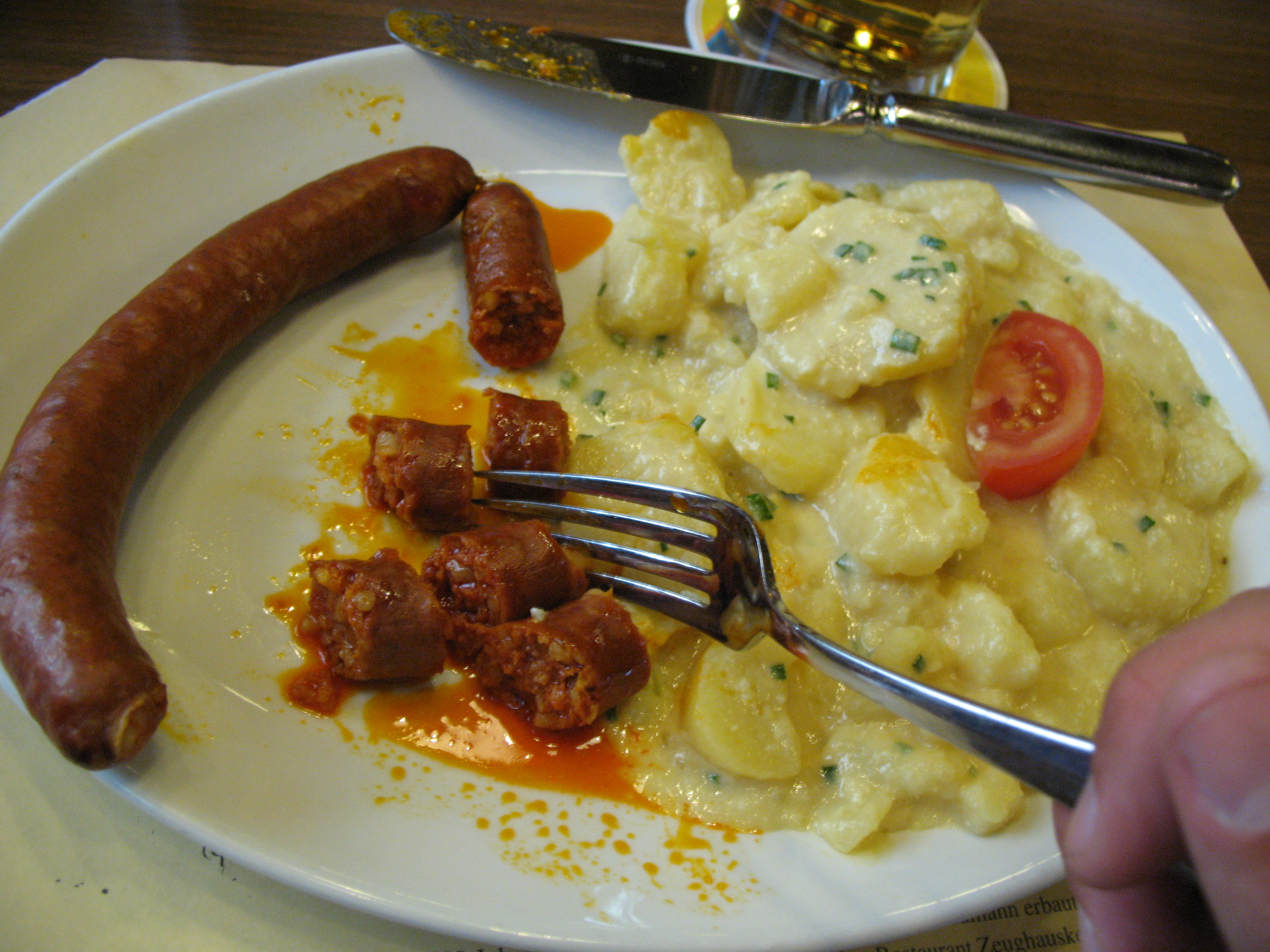
Swiss cuisine – paprika sausage with potatoes at the Zeughauskeller, Zürich, Switzerland

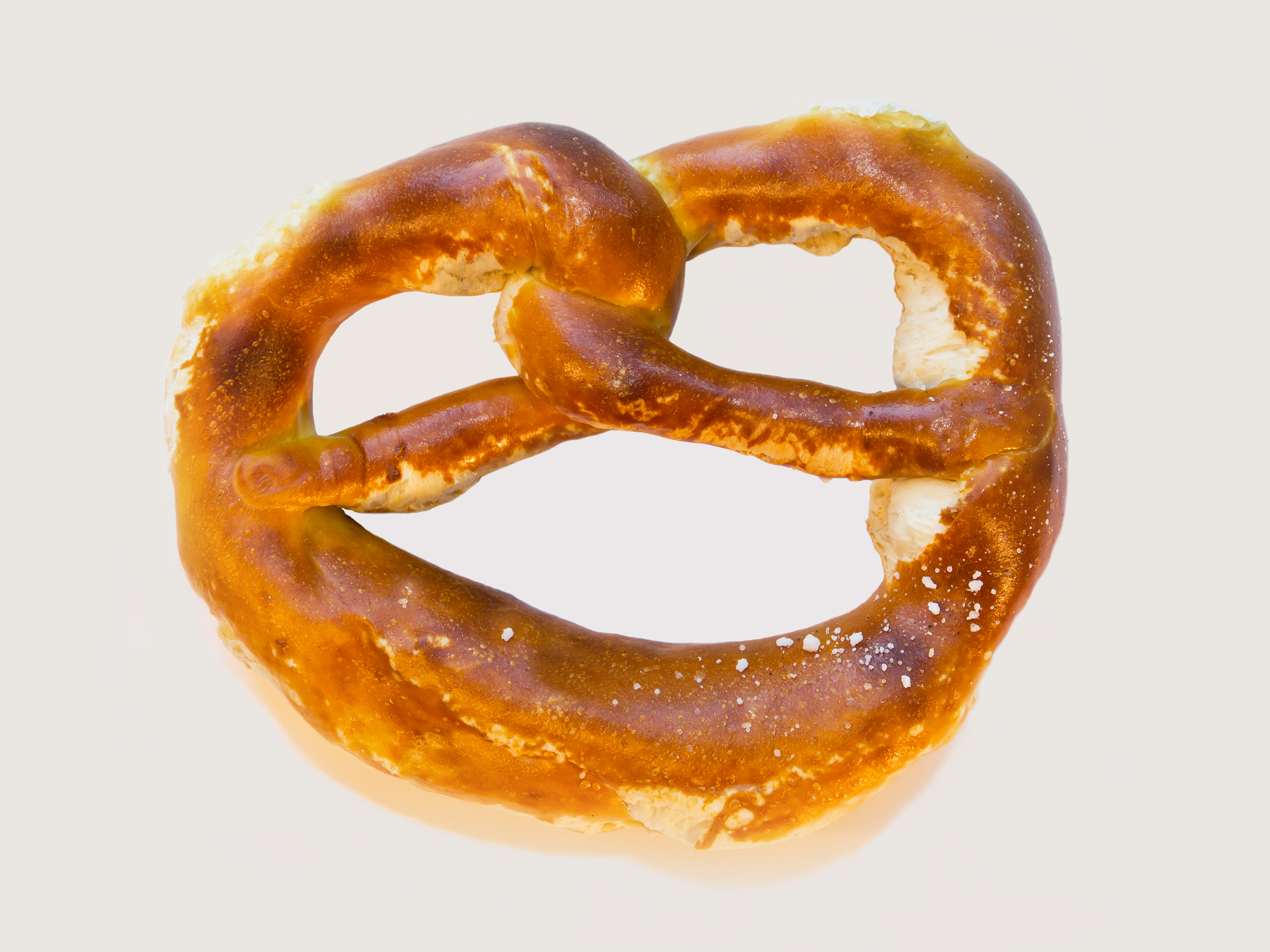
Pretzels are especially common in Southern Germany.

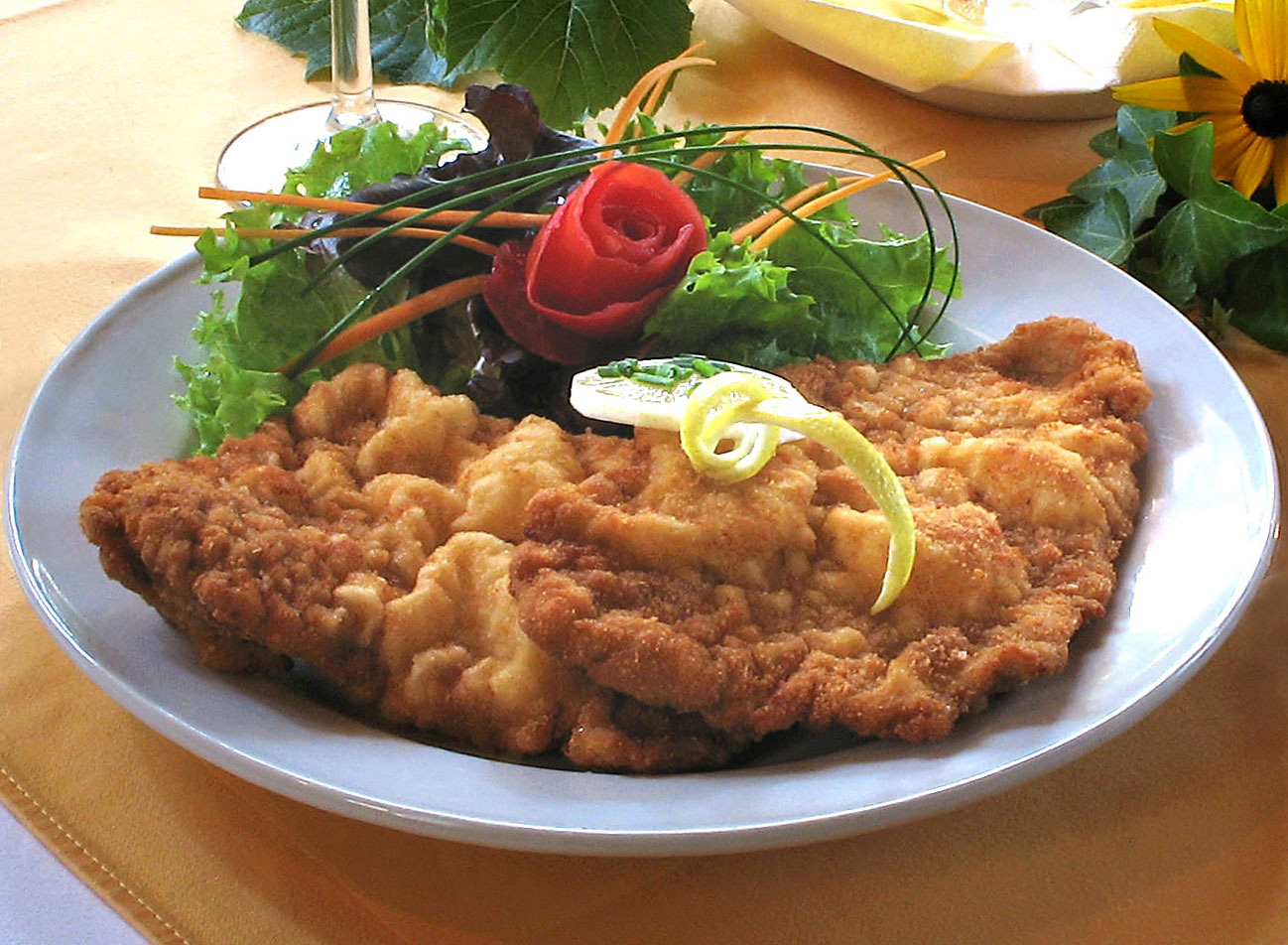
Austrian Wiener Schnitzel

== Eastern European cuisines ==
- Cuisines of Eastern Europe

- Belarusian cuisine shares the same roots with cuisines of other Eastern and Northern European countries, basing predominantly on meat and various vegetables typical for the region.

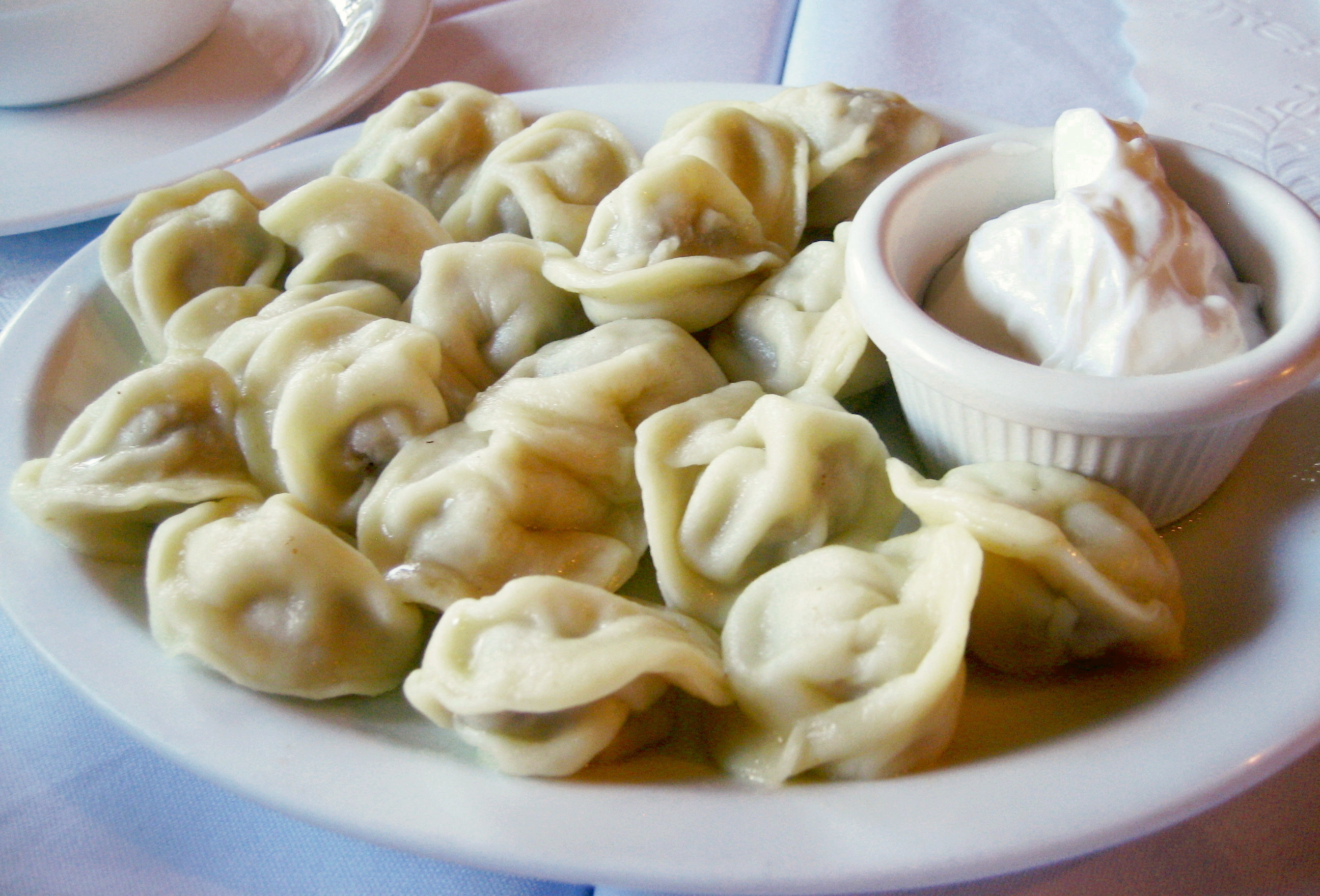
A plate of pelmeni. These types of dumplings are usually filled with minced meat.

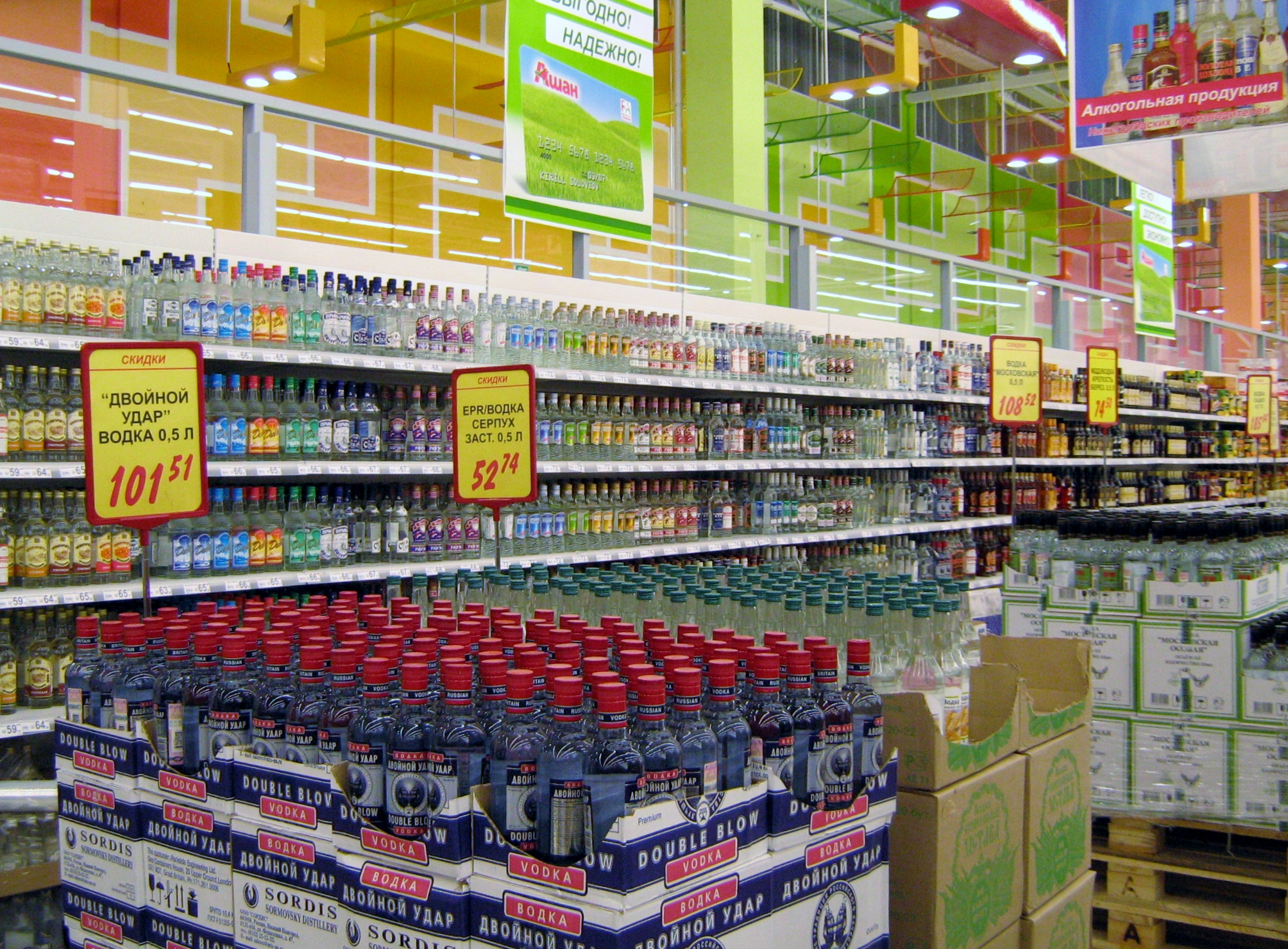
A large selection of Russian vodka

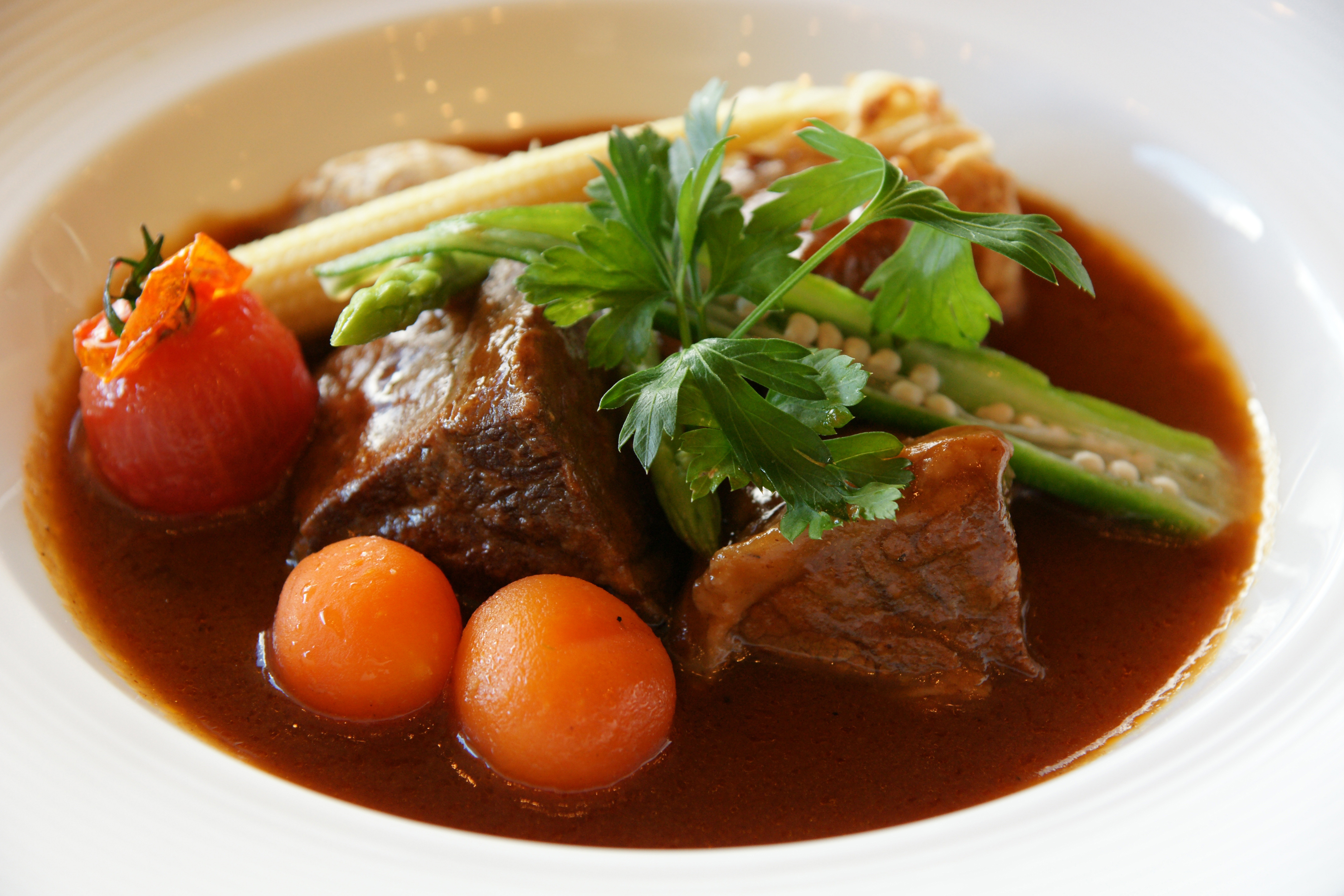
Telesko vareno, Bulgarian beef soup

- Kazakh cuisine
- Moldovan cuisine – Moldova's fertile soil (chernozem) produces plentiful grapes, fruits, vegetables, cereals, meat and milk products, all of which have found their uses in the national cuisine. The fertile black soil combined with the use of traditional agricultural methods permits growing a wide range of ecologically clean foods in Moldova.

- Moldovan wine

- Romanian cuisine is a diverse blend of different dishes from several traditions with which it has come into contact, but it also maintains its own character. It has been greatly influenced by Ottoman cuisine.

- Romanian wine

- Russian cuisine is diverse, as Russia is the largest country in the world. Russia's great expansions of territory, influence, and interest during the 16th–18th centuries brought more refined foods and culinary techniques, as well as one of the most refined food countries in the world. It was during this period that smoked meats and fish, pastry cooking, salads and green vegetables, chocolate, ice cream, wine, and liquor were imported from abroad. At least for the urban aristocracy and provincial gentry, this opened the doors for the creative integration of these new foodstuffs with traditional Russian dishes. The result is extremely varied in technique, seasoning, and combination. Traditional and common Russian foods include:

- Beer
- Blini, a pastry rolled with a variety of ingredients
- Borshch, a traditional Ukrainian beet soup
- Caviar
- Crêpe
- Ice cream
- Pelmeni, pastry dumplings filled with minced meat
- Pirozhki, pastries filled with potato, cabbage, meat or cheese
- Shashlyk, Russian kebab
- Sour cream
- Russian vodka

- Tatar cuisine
- Mordovian cuisine
- Russian wine

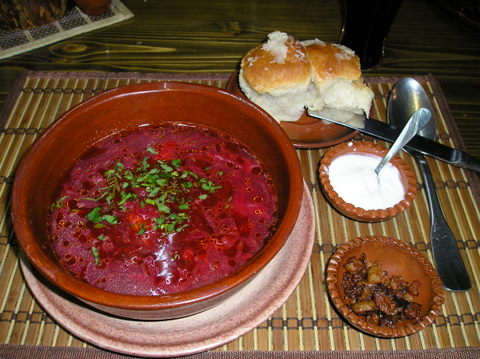
Ukrainian borscht with side dishes of smetana, pampushky and pork cracklings

- Ukrainian cuisine has significant diversity, historical traditions and is influenced by Russian, Turkish and Polish cuisines. Common foods used include meats, vegetables, mushrooms, fruits, berries and herbs. In Ukraine, bread is a staple food, there are many different types of bread, and Ukraine is sometimes referred to as the "breadbasket of Europe." Pickled vegetables are utilized, particularly when fresh vegetables are not in season. There are about 30 varieties of Ukrainian Borscht soup, a common dish that often includes meat.

- Crimean Tatar cuisine is primarily the cuisine of the Crimean Tatars, who live on the Crimean Peninsula in Ukraine. The traditional cuisine of the Crimean Tatars derives basically from the same roots as the cuisine of the Volga Tatars, although unlike the Volga Tatars they do not eat horse meat and do not drink mare's milk (kymyz). However, the Crimean Tatars adopted many Uzbek dishes during their exile in Central Asia since 1944, and these dishes have been absorbed into Crimean Tatar national cuisine after their return to Crimea.
- Ukrainian wine

- Caucasian cuisine – cuisines of The Caucasus

- Armenian cuisine includes the foods and cooking techniques of the Armenian people, the Armenian diaspora and traditional Armenian foods and dishes. The cuisine reflects the history and geography where Armenians have lived as well as incorporating outside influences. The cuisine also reflects the traditional crops and animals grown and raised in areas populated by Armenians.

- Armenian wine

- Azerbaijani cuisine is the cuisine of Azerbaijan. Azerbaijani cuisine throughout the centuries has been influenced by the foods of different cultures due to political and economic processes in Azerbaijan. Out of 11 climate zones known in the world, the Azerbaijani climate has nine. This contributes to the fertility of the land, which in its turn results in the richness of the country's cuisine.

- Azerbaijani wine

- Georgian cuisine refers to the cooking styles and dishes with origins in the nation of Georgia and prepared by Georgian people around the world. The Georgian cuisine is specific to the country, but also contains some influences from the Middle Eastern and European culinary traditions.

- Georgian wine

== Northern European cuisines ==
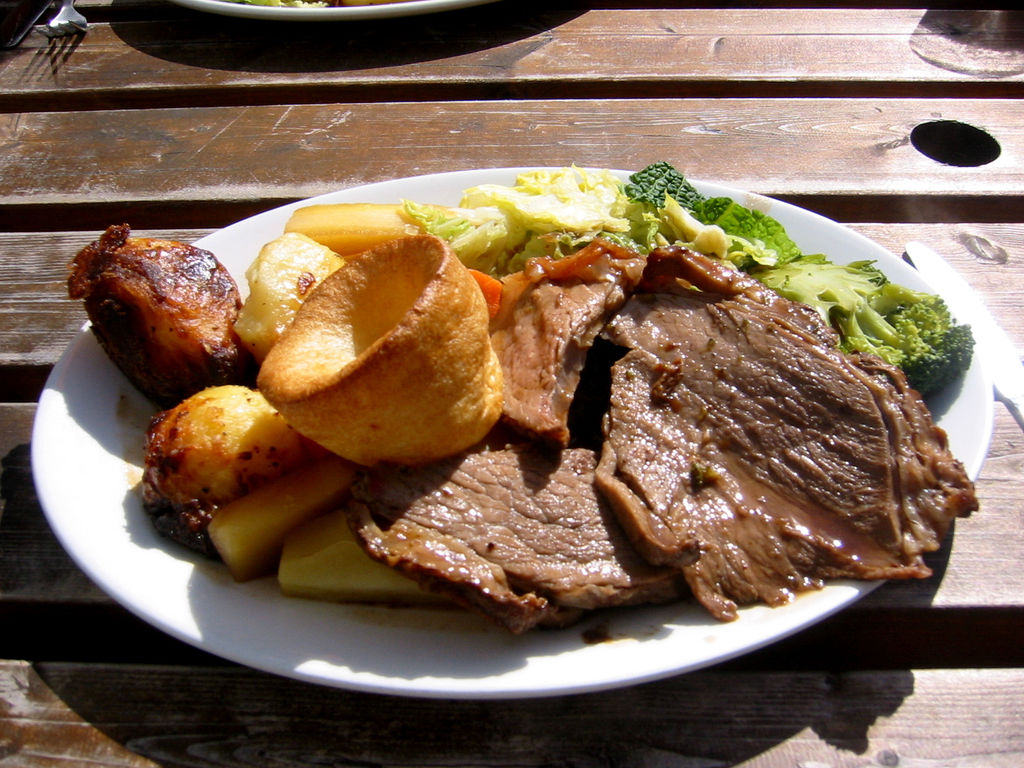
An English Sunday roast with roast beef, roast potatoes, vegetables and Yorkshire pudding

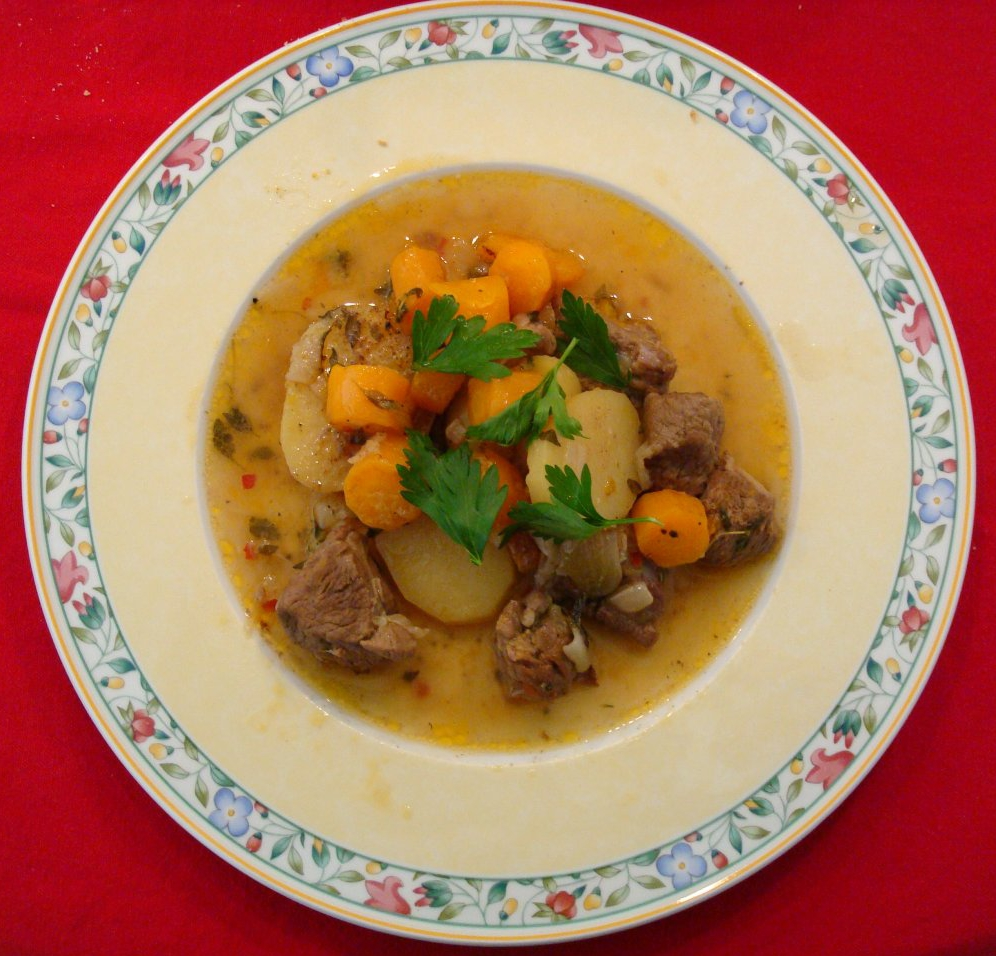
Irish stew is a traditional stew made from lamb, or mutton, potatoes, carrots, onions, and parsley.

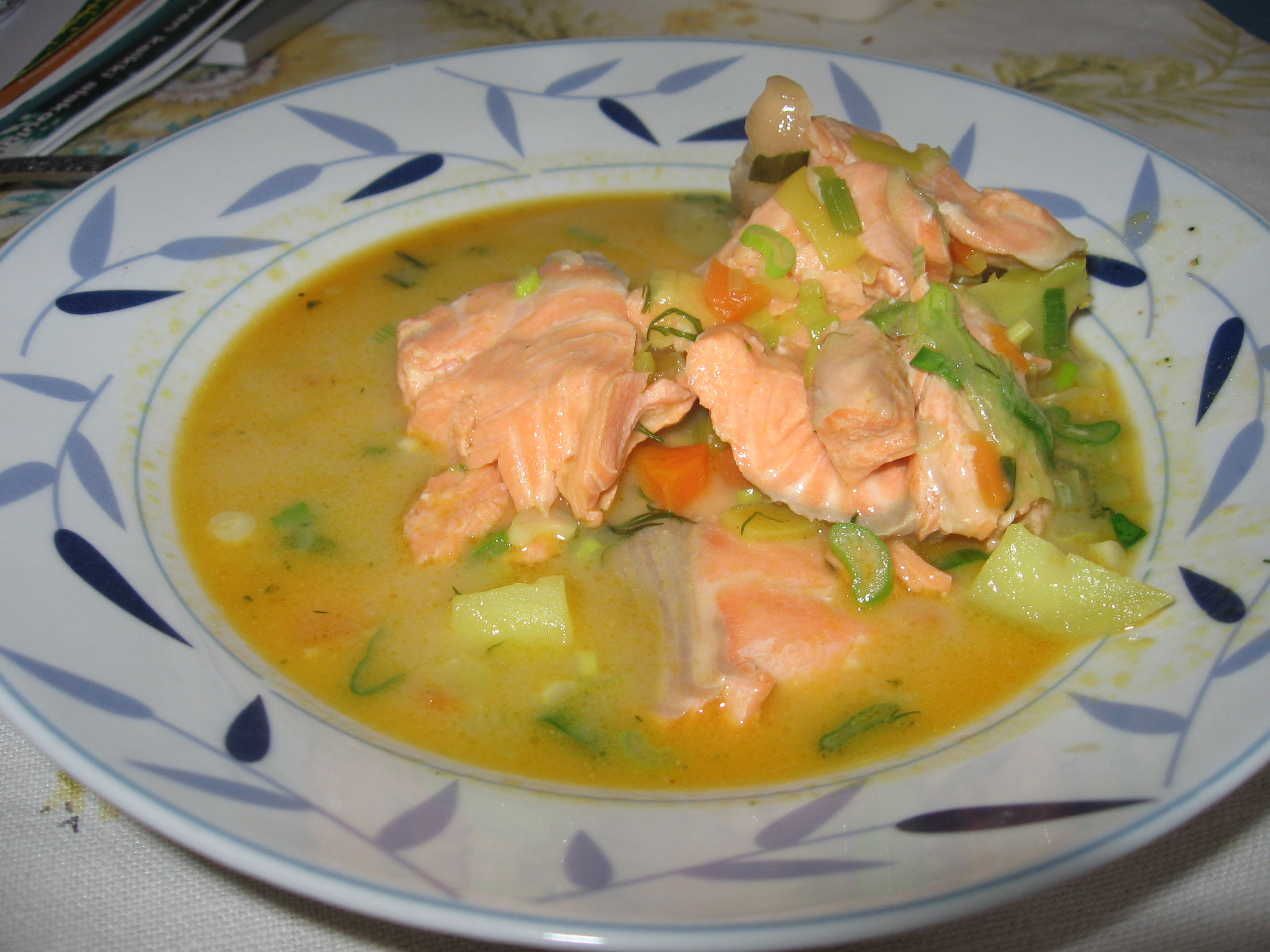
Lohikeitto is a creamy salmon soup and a common dish in Finland and other Nordic countries.

- Baltic cuisines

- Estonian cuisine
- Latvian cuisine
- Lithuanian cuisine
- Livonian cuisine

- Cuisines of the Islands of the North Atlantic (IONA)

- British cuisine is the specific set of cooking traditions and practices associated with the United Kingdom. British cuisine has been described as "unfussy dishes made with quality local ingredients, matched with simple sauces to accentuate flavour, rather than disguise it." However, British cuisine has absorbed the cultural influence of those that have settled in Britain, producing hybrid dishes, such as the Anglo-Indian chicken tikka masala.

- Channel Islands cuisine
- English cuisine

- Cornish cuisine
- Devonian cuisine
- Dorset cuisine

- Northern Irish cuisine
- Scottish cuisine is the specific set of cooking traditions and practices associated with Scotland. It has distinctive attributes and recipes of its own, but shares much with wider European cuisine as a result of foreign and local influences both ancient and modern. Scotland's natural larder of game, dairy, fish, fruit, and vegetables is the integral factor in traditional Scottish cooking. Scotland, with its temperate climate and abundance of indigenous game species, has provided a cornucopia of food for its inhabitants for millennia. The wealth of seafood available on and off the coasts provided the earliest settlers with their sustenance. Agriculture was introduced, with primitive oats quickly becoming the staple.
- Welsh cuisine

- Cuisine of Carmarthenshire
- Cuisine of Ceredigion
- Cuisine of Gower
- Cuisine of Monmouthshire
- Cuisine of Pembrokeshire
- Cuisine of the Vale of Glamorgan

- Wine from the United Kingdom
- Regional foods

- British Sunday roast
- Fish and chips

- Irish cuisine

- Nordic cuisines

- Danish cuisine

- Danish wine
- Faroese cuisine
- New Nordic cuisine

- Finnish cuisine
- Icelandic cuisine
- Norwegian cuisine
- Sami cuisine
- Swedish cuisine

- Swedish wine

Northern European foods and dishes

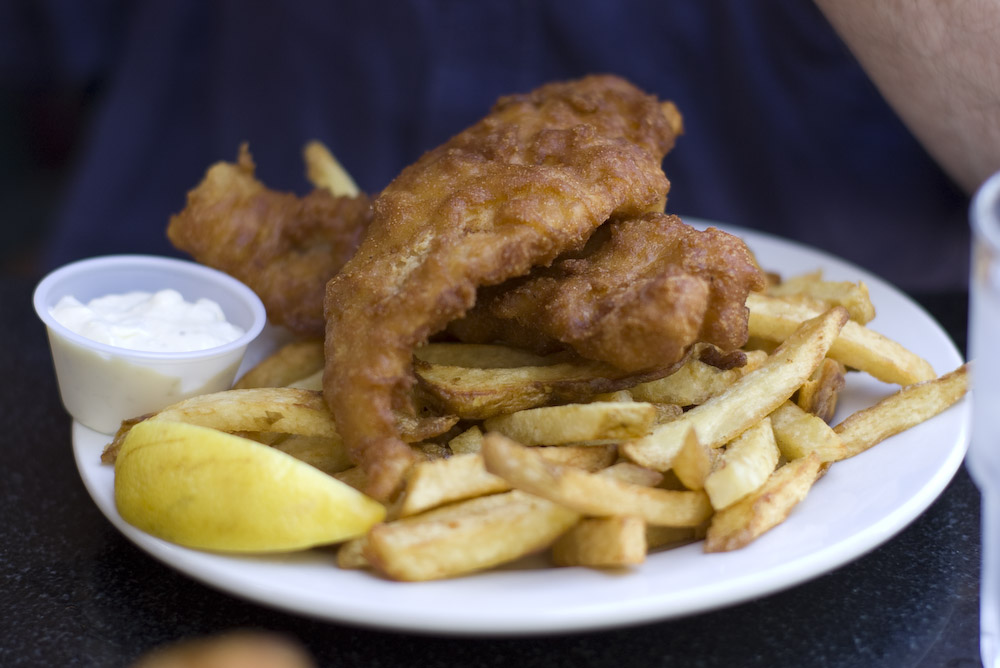
Fish and chips is an English dish of fried fish in crispy batter served with chips.

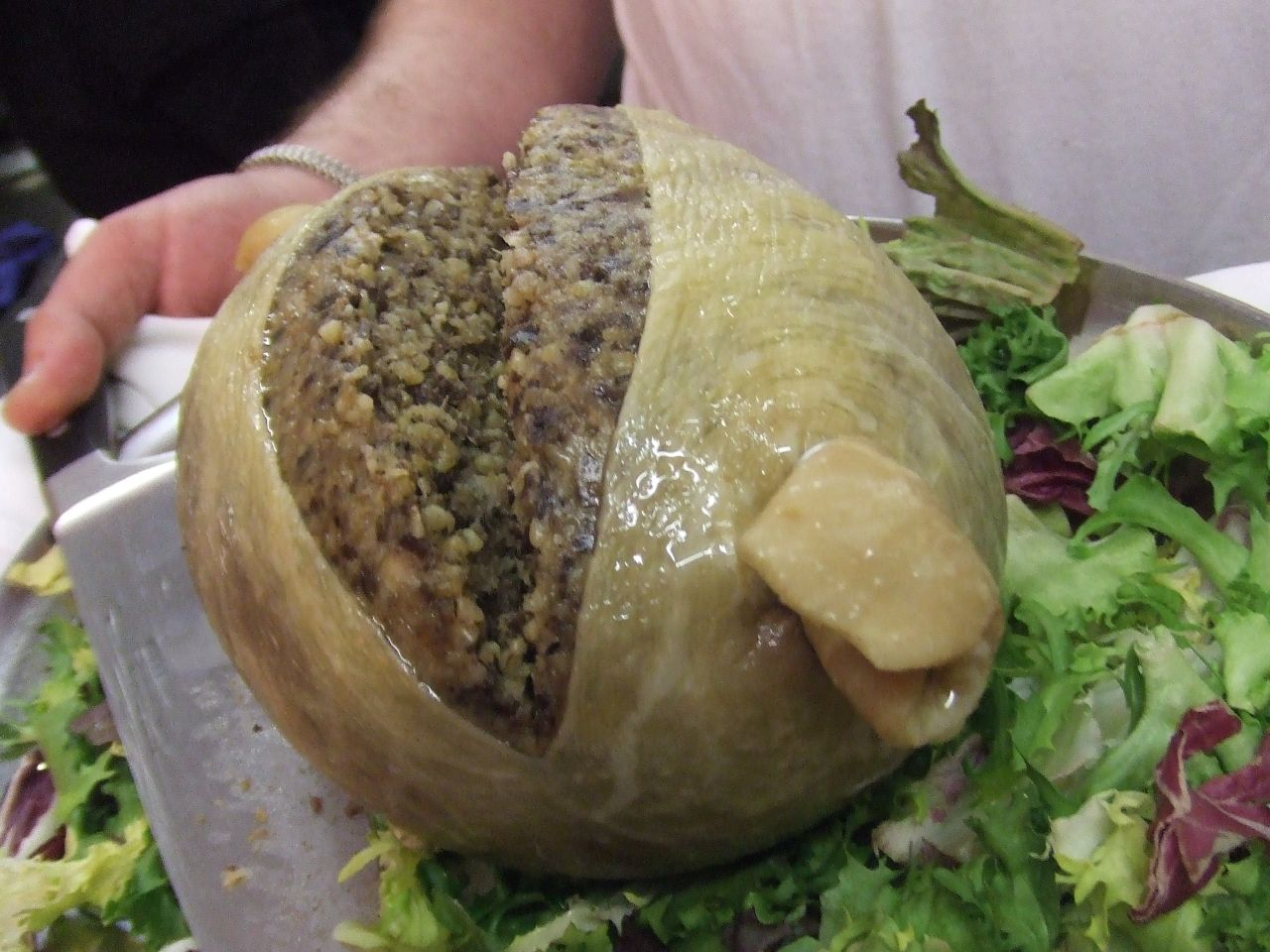
Haggis is a Scottish savoury pudding containing sheep's pluck (heart, liver, and lungs), minced with onion, oatmeal, suet, spices, and salt, mixed with stock, and cooked while traditionally encased in the animal's stomach.

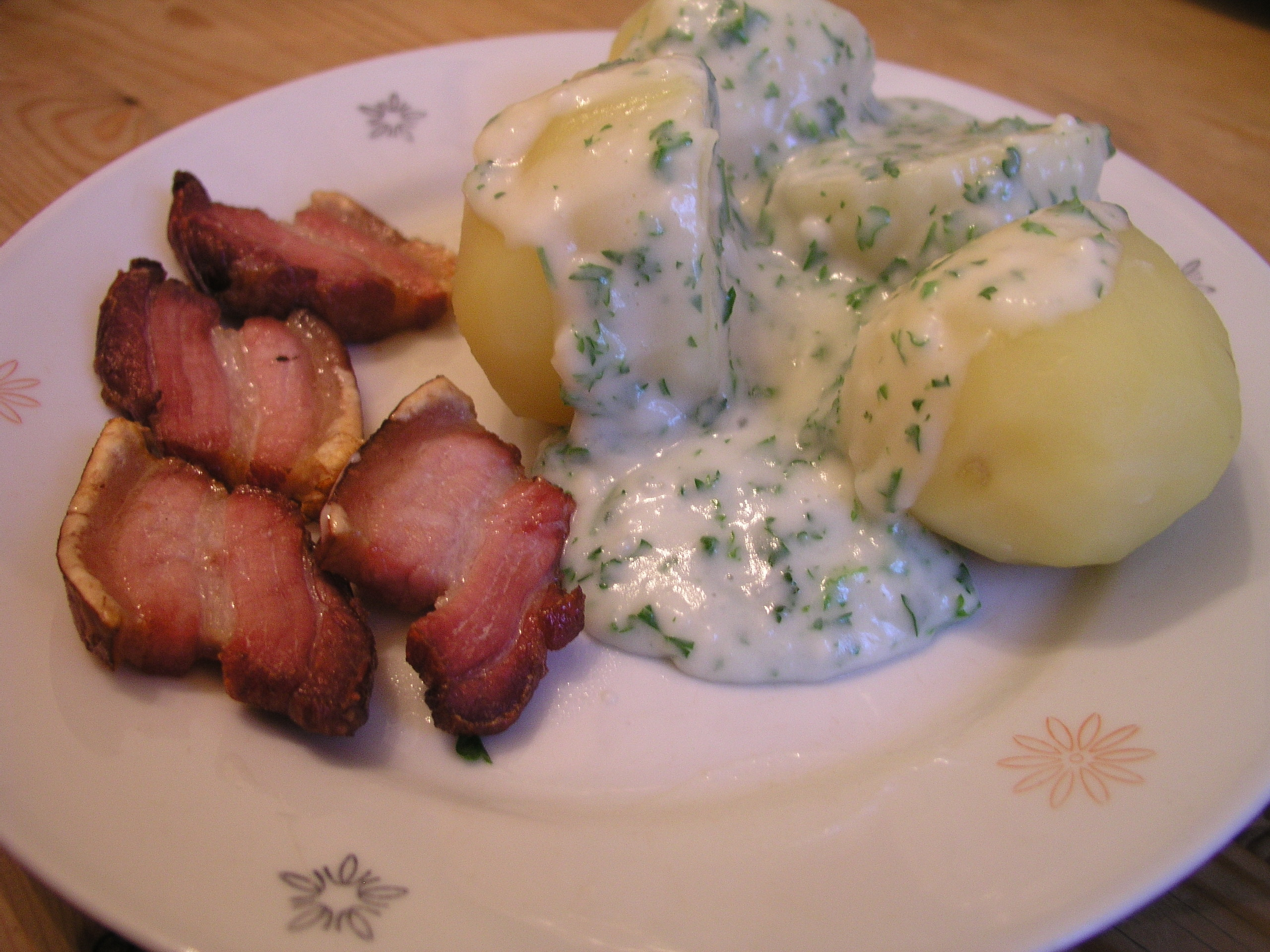
Stegt flæsk is a Danish national dish of fried pork belly generally served with potatoes and parsley sauce (persillesovs).

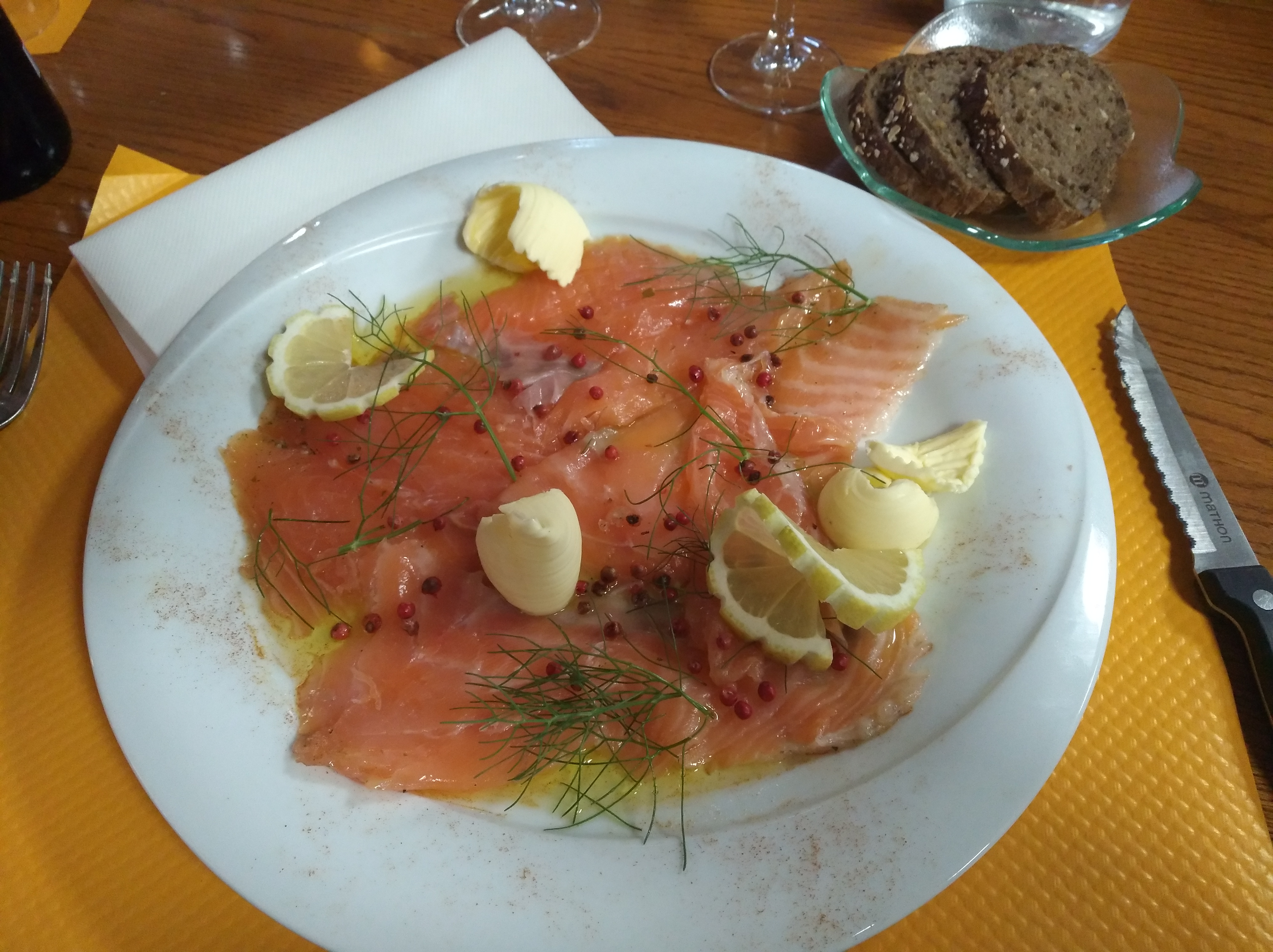
Gravlax is a Nordic dish consisting of salmon that is cured using a mix of salt and sugar.

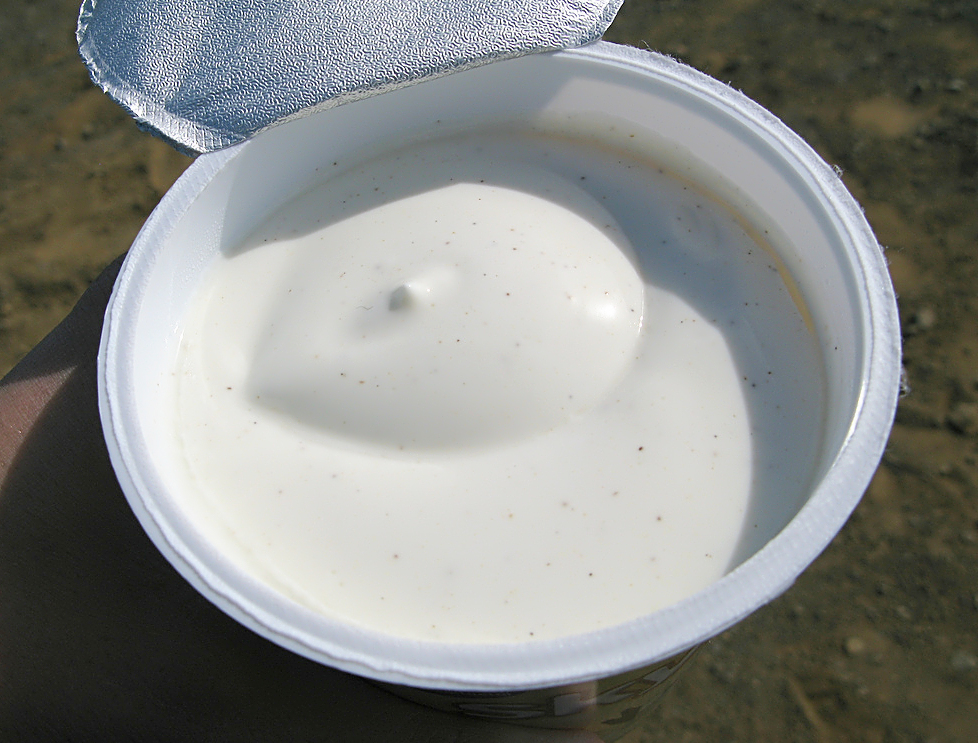
Skyr is an Icelandic cultured dairy product that has been a staple of the Icelandic diet since the Viking age.

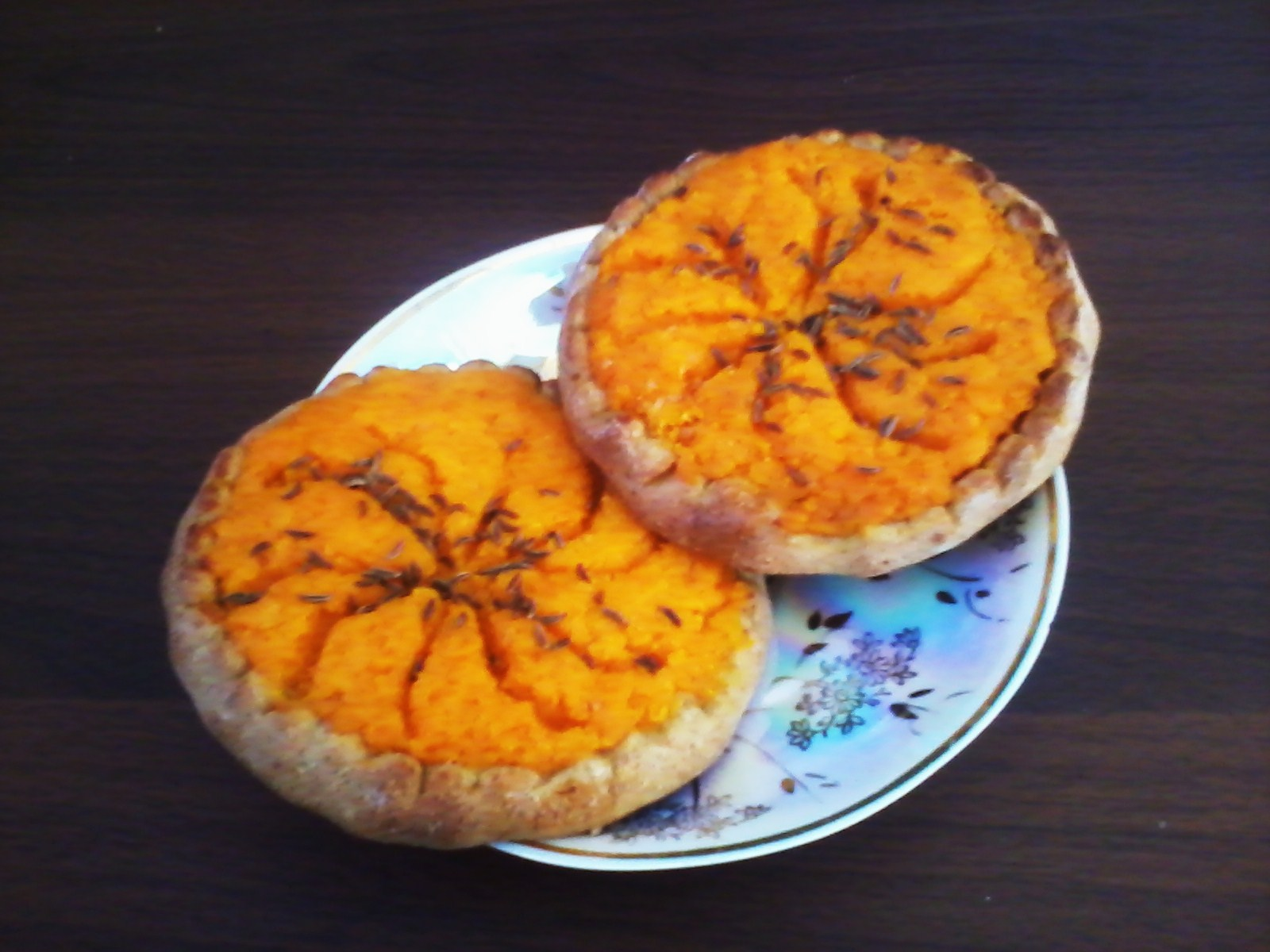
Sklandrausis is a sweet Latvian pie of Livonian origin, made of rye dough and filled with potato and carrot paste and caraway.

== Western European cuisines ==
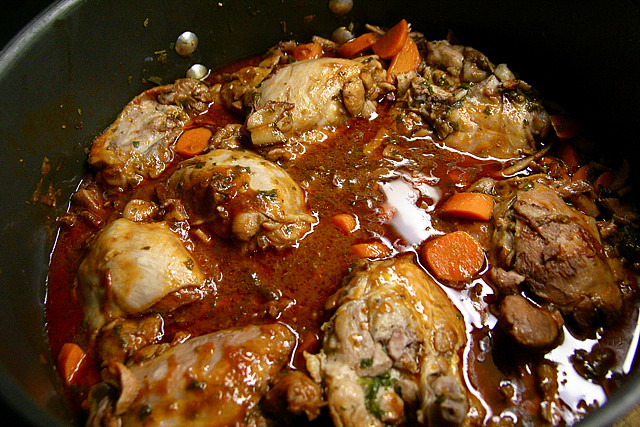
Coq au vin is a French braise of chicken cooked with wine, lardons, mushrooms, and optionally garlic.

- Belgian cuisine

- Belgian wine

- Dutch cuisine

- Dutch wine

- French cuisine

- French regional cuisine is characterized by its extreme diversity and style. Traditionally, each region of France has its own distinctive cuisine. French cuisine styles include nouvelle cuisine, haute cuisine and cuisine classique. In November 2010 the French gastronomy was added by UNESCO to its lists of the world's "intangible cultural heritage".

- Corsican cuisine
- Lyonnaise cuisine
- Cuisine and specialties of Nord-Pas-de-Calais

- French wine

- Frisian cuisine
- Limburgian cuisine
- Luxembourgian cuisine

- Luxembourg wine

- Monégasque cuisine
- Occitan cuisine
Western European foods and dishes

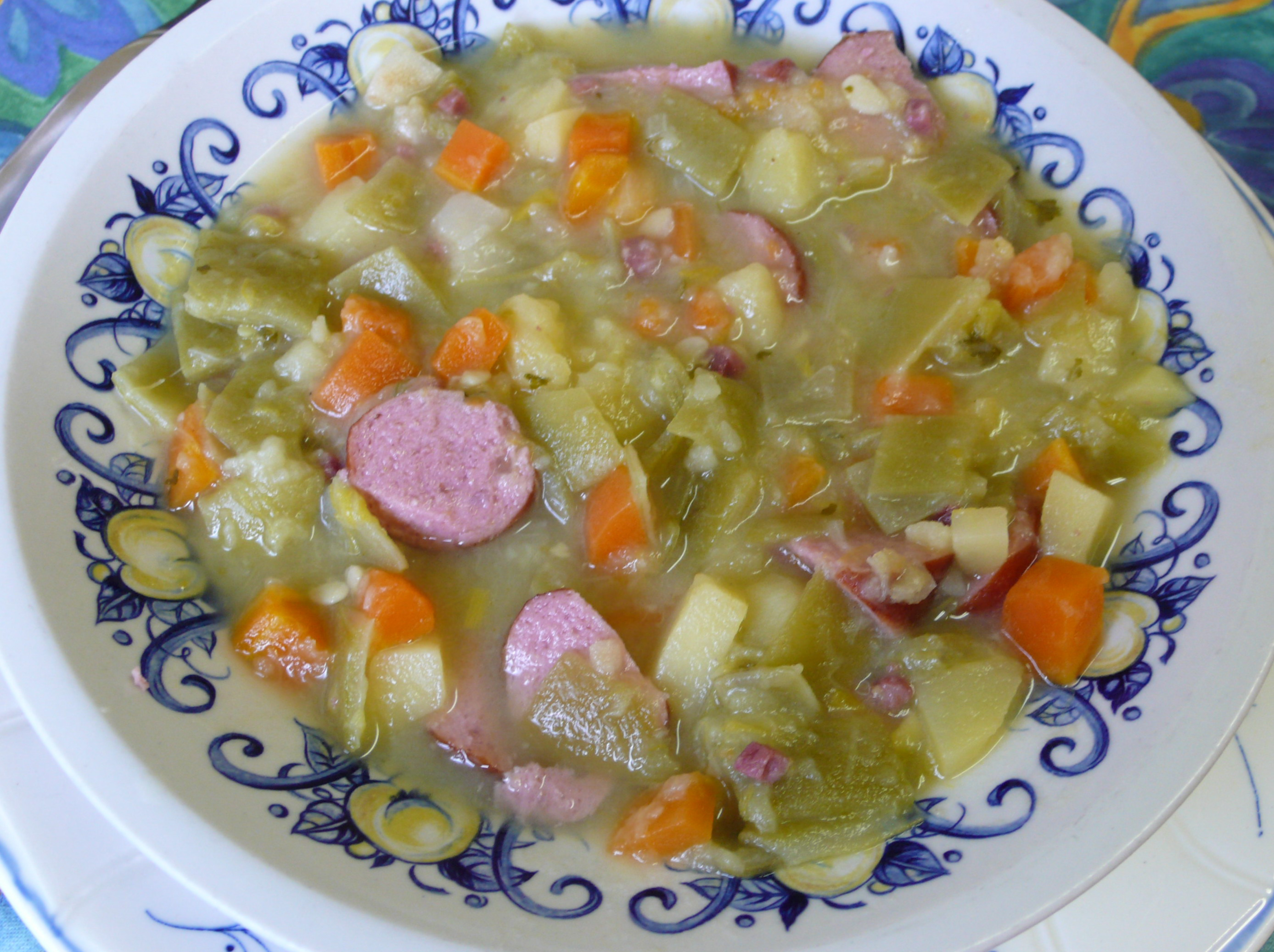
Bouneschlupp is a traditional Luxembourgish green bean soup with potatoes, bacon, and onions.

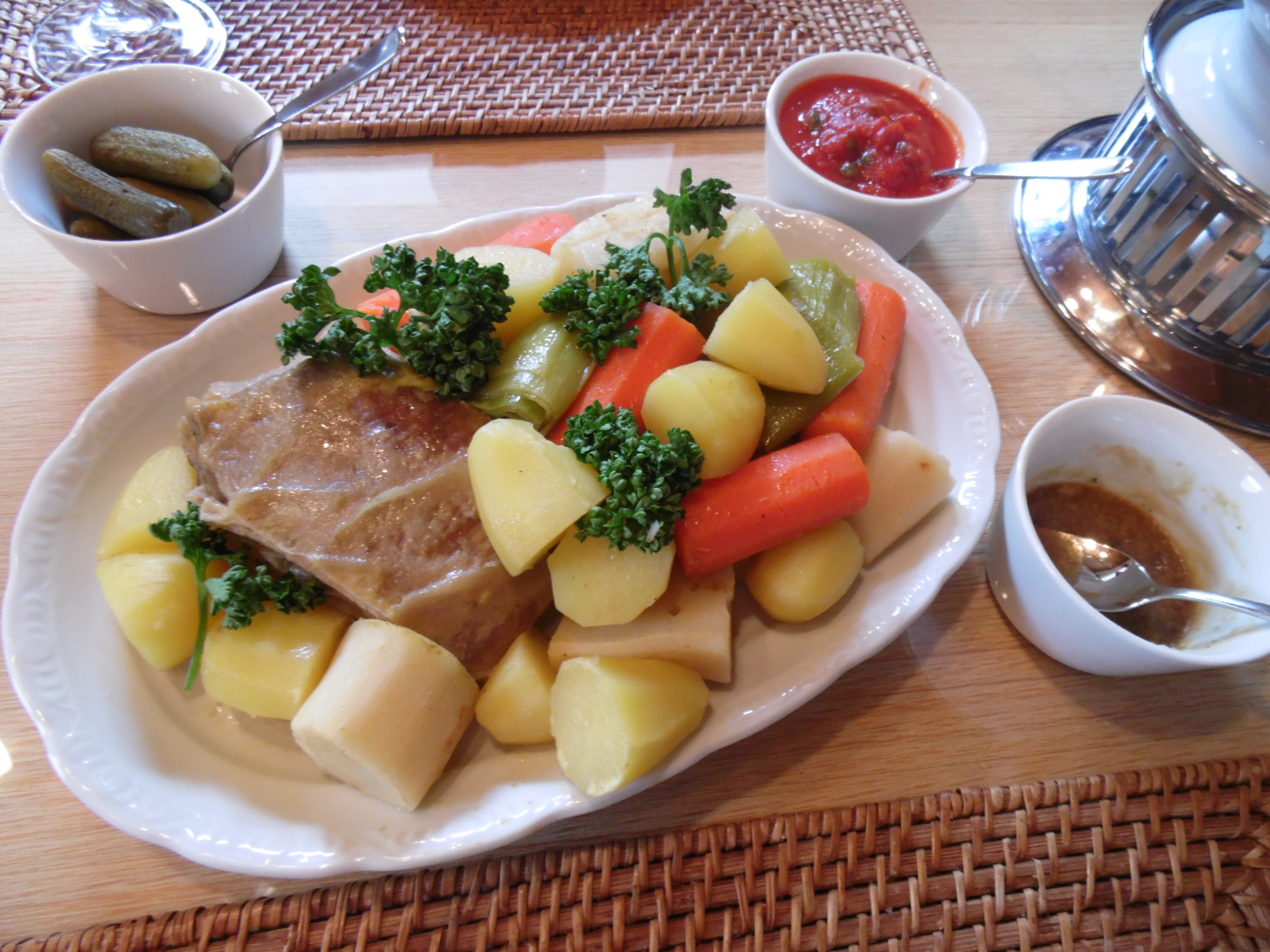
Pot-au-feu is a French dish of slowly boiled meat, typically beef, and vegetables.

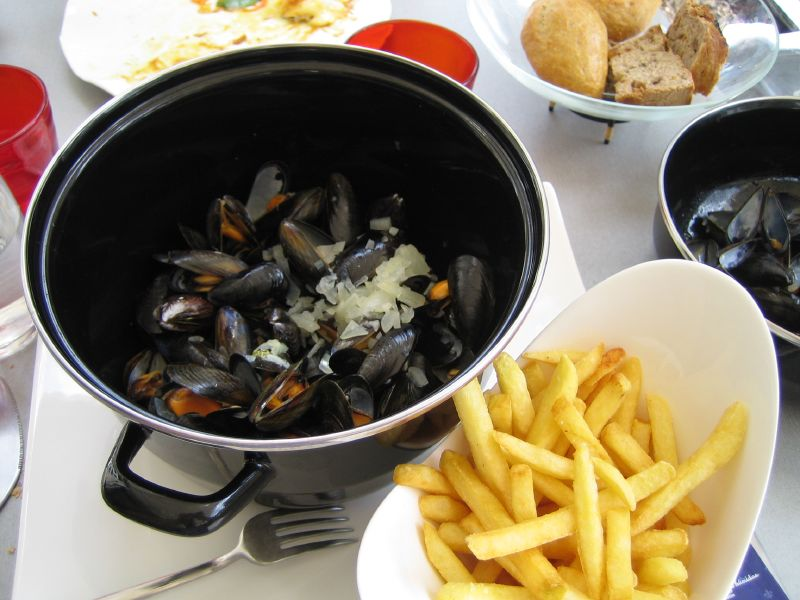
Moules-frites is a Belgian dish of mussels and fries.

== Regional cuisines ==
- Regional Dutch cuisines can be distinguished by three geographic regions in the Netherlands, northeastern, western and southern cuisine.
- German regional cuisine can be divided into Bavarian cuisine (Southern Germany), Lower Saxon cuisine (Northern Germany), Thuringian (Central Germany) and Saxony-Anhalt (Central Germany).
- The Alpine cuisine is characterised throughout the entire Alpine region by the isolated rural life on the alpine huts and in the mountain villages.

== Historical cuisines ==
- Regional cuisines of medieval Europe were the results of differences in climate, seasonal food variations, political administration and religious customs that varied across the continent.

== See also ==
- List of cuisines
