= A Noodle Story =

Street food stall in Singapore

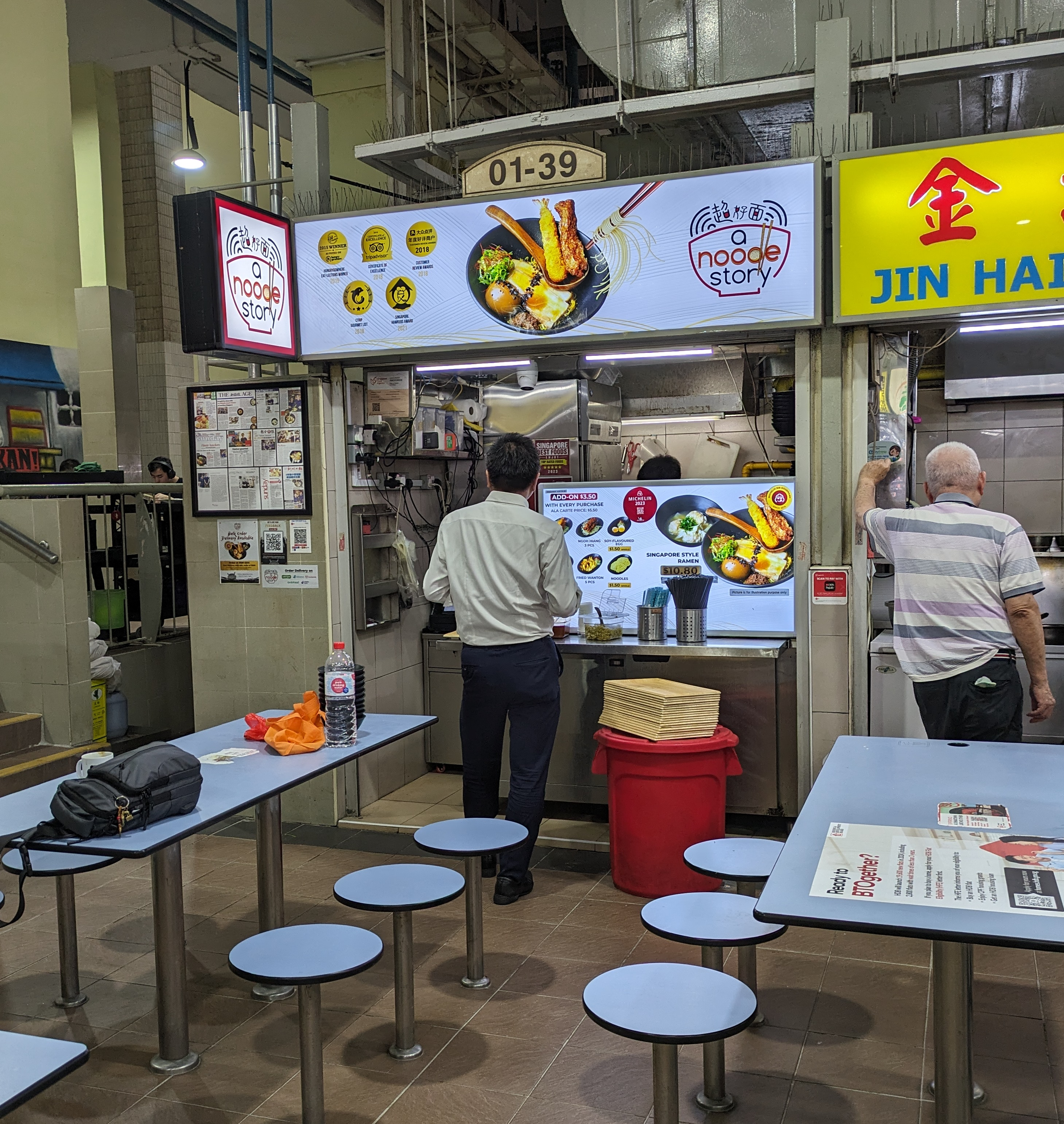
- Interactive map of A Noodle Story

Restaurant information
- Head chef: William Ng
- Food type: Street food
- Location: 7 Maxwell Road, #01-39, Amoy Street Food Centre, 069111, Singapore
- Coordinates: 1.279352°N 103.846666°E
- Website: anoodlestorydotcom.wordpress.com

A Noodle Story is a street food stall in the Amoy Street Food Centre in Singapore. The food stall was awarded the Michelin Bib Gourmand in 2017. A new outlet in the Guoco Tower was opened in 2021.

== Description ==
The stall was founded by Ben Tham and Gwern Khoo, the latter of whom being a former chef at Waku Ghin and Iggy's, in 2013. The stall serves Singapore-styled ramen, among other dishes.

During the 2021 circuit breaker period, the stall offered delivery using third-party websites.

== Reception ==
The stall was one of 37 stalls in Singapore to be awarded the Michelin Bib Gourmand Award in 2016. It has maintained its position in the Michelin Bib Gourmand. It won the Favourite Street Food Vendor award during the GastroMonth Circle of Excellence Awards later that year.

== See also ==
- Hawker centre
