= Gastronomy in Singapore =

Coordinates: 1.3°N 103.8°E

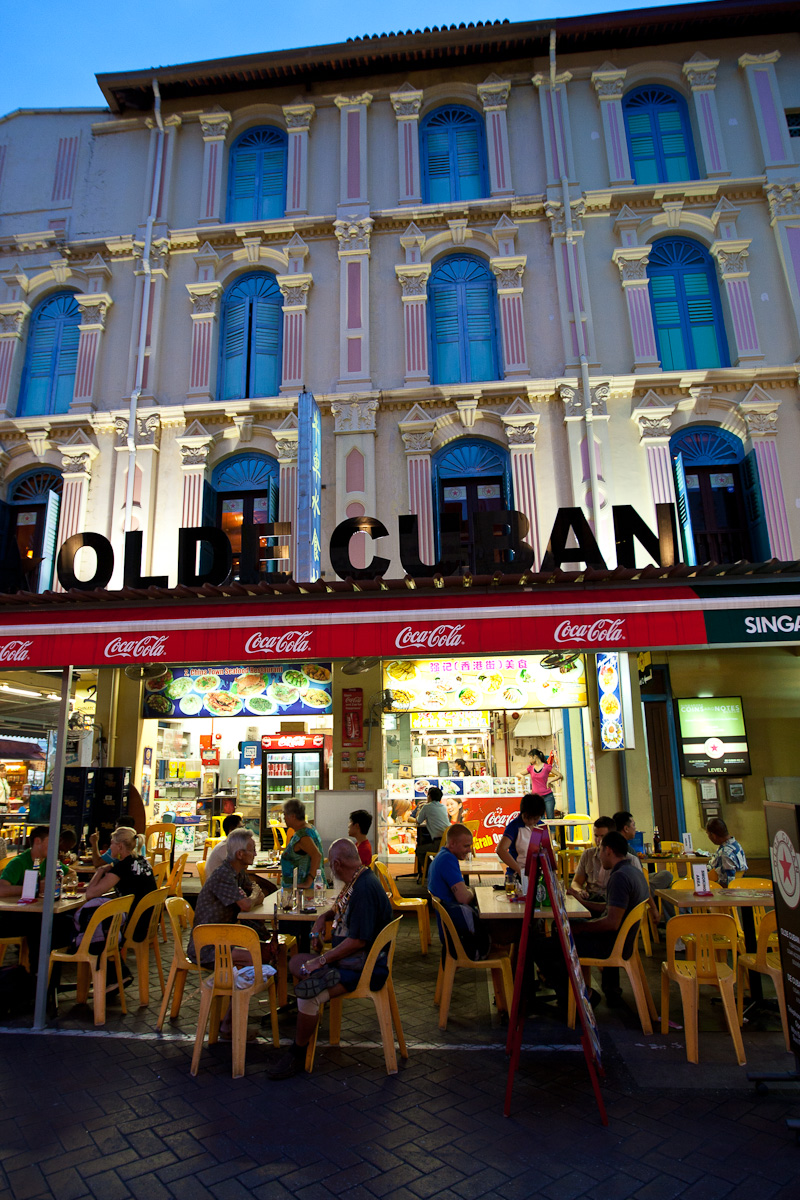
Olde Cuban restaurant, Chinatown, Singapore

Notable eateries in Singapore are café, coffee shop, convenience stores, fast food restaurant, food courts, hawker centres, restaurant (casual), speciality food shops, and fine dining restaurants. Singapore is commonly touted as a food paradise. In 2023, food and beverage accounted for 15% of Singapore’s tourism expenditure.

According to Singstat in 2014 there were 6,668 outlets, where 2,426 are considered as sit down places. According to ACRA every day two new restaurants open daily in Singapore.

The variety of Singaporean cuisine covers basically all notable ethnic groups and cultures.

== Types of restaurant ==
=== Fine dining restaurants ===
The city-state offers a wide selection of food places, such as simple kitchens or high-priced restaurants. The area of fine dining restaurants is also characterised by the strong presence of celebrity chefs including: Jamie Oliver (Jamie's Italian), Wolfgang Puck (CUT), Daniel Boulud (Maison Boulud), Tetsuya Wakuda (Wakuda and Waku Ghin),Mario Batali (Osteria Mozza), David Myers (Adrift), Gordon Ramsay (Bread Street Kitchen). Most of them are located at Marina Bay Sands.

=== Hawker centre and street food ===
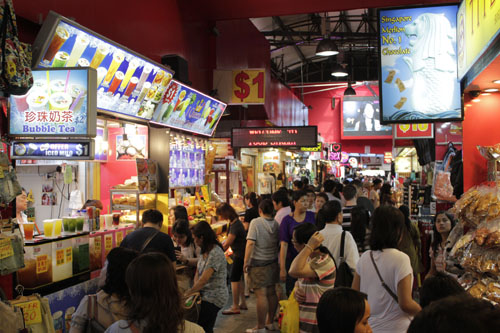
Street food in food stalls on Bugis Street along New Bugis Street, Singapore.

Singapore has a diverse street food scene. Its origins begin with immigrants from India, Malaysia and China who sold cuisine from their native countries to other immigrants who sought a familiar taste.

Street food is now sold in hawker centres with communal seating areas that contain hundreds of food stalls. Typically, these areas have plastic seating and are covered by makeshift tin roofs, but some are located in casinos or hotels such as the Marina Bay Sands resort.

Dishes served are varied and range from curries, rice and noodle-based dishes as well as those eaten less commonly by western tourists, such as chicken feet or pig's organ soup. The food is not limited to just dishes from Singapore or neighbouring Malaysia, and can include those of Chinese or Indian origin.

=== Cafes ===
Cafes are a relatively new popular option for Singaporeans in recent years. Besides large coffee chains such as Starbucks and The Coffee Bean & Tea Leaf, newer local cafes are also being opened. Diners not only expect good coffee but have high standards for both the taste and appearance of café foods. Popular cafe foods include varieties of Eggs Benedict, pancake and French toast.

== See also ==
- Food and drink prohibitions
- List of coffeehouse chains
- List of chicken restaurants
- List of countries with organic agriculture regulation
- List of shopping malls in Singapore
- List of supermarket chains in Singapore
- List of vegetarian and vegan restaurants
- List of restaurants in Singapore
