= List of Michelin-starred restaurants in Singapore =

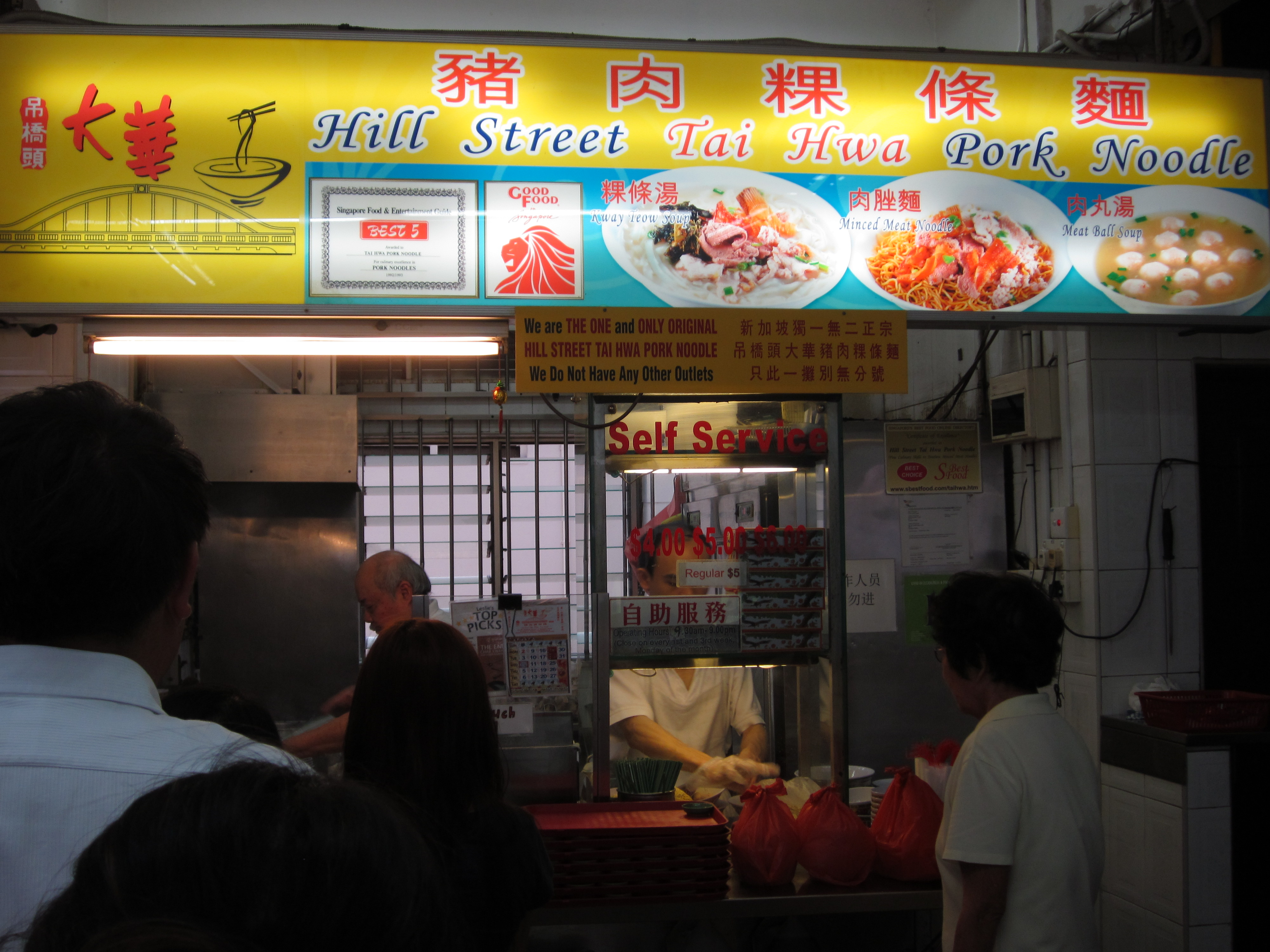
Hill Street Tai Hwa Pork Noodle, a Michelin starred Singaporean hawker stall

As of the 2026 Michelin Guide, there are 45 restaurants in Singapore with a Michelin-star rating.

The Michelin Guide for Singapore was first published in 2016. At the time, Singapore was the first country in Southeast Asia to have Michelin-starred restaurants and stalls, and was one of the four states in general in the Asia-Pacific along with Japan and the special administrative regions (SAR) of Hong Kong and Macau.

In the 2016 edition, two hawker stalls, Hill Street Tai Hwa Pork Noodle and Hong Kong Soya Sauce Chicken Rice and Noodle, became the first set of Southeast Asian street stalls to be bestowed with Michelin stars. Hong Kong Soya Sauce Chicken Rice & Noodle's most notable dish and also the country's national dish, chicken rice, also became the cheapest Michelin-star meal in the world at S$2 (US$1.60) a serving.

In September 2019, Odette and Les Amis were awarded the three stars award. In September 2021, Zen was awarded the three stars award, resulting in Singapore having three Michelin three-starred restaurants for the first time since the award's inception.

The 10th edition of the Michelin Guide Singapore, released on 4 August 2026, awarded stars to 45 establishments, an increase from 42 the previous year, including seven restaurants receiving their first stars. Two restaurants, 1887 by André and Seroja, were promoted to two stars, bringing the number of two star restaurants to nine, while the number of three star restaurants remained at three.

== 2026 list ==
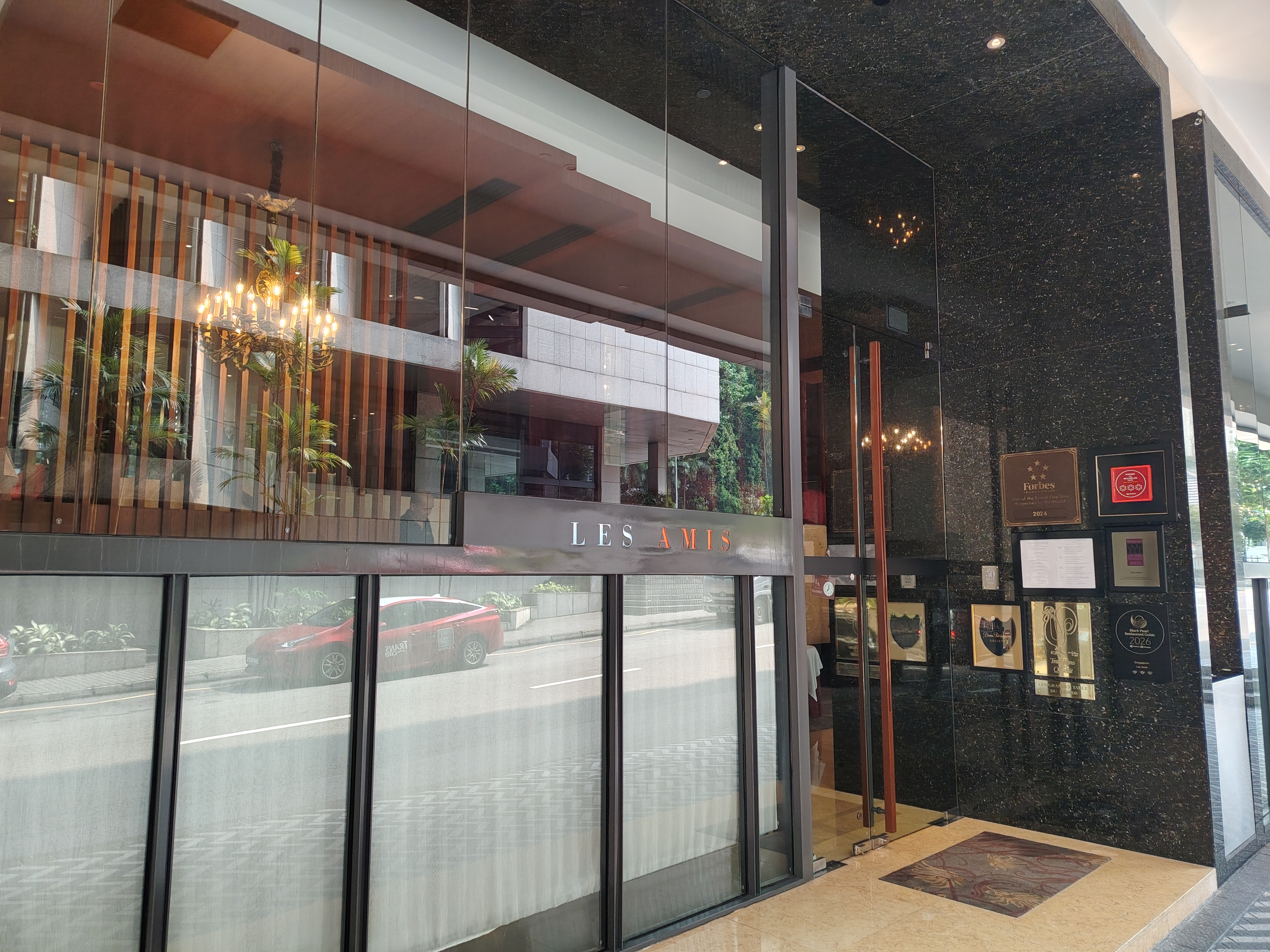
Entrance to Les Amis, one of the three restaurants in Singapore with three Michelin stars

Key
1 Michelin star	One Michelin star
2 Michelin stars	Two Michelin stars
3 Michelin stars	Three Michelin stars

Michelin-starred restaurants
Name	Cuisine	Location	2026
1887 by Andre	French	Central Region - Central Area	2 Michelin stars
Araya	Innovative	Central Region - Central Area	1 Michelin star
Born	Innovative	Central Region - Central Area	1 Michelin star
Buona Terra	Italian	Central Region - Central Area	1 Michelin star
Burnt Ends	Barbecue	Central Region - Tanglin	1 Michelin star
Candlenut	Peranakan	Central Region - Tanglin	1 Michelin star
Cherry Garden	Cantonese	Central Region - Central Area	1 Michelin star
Cloudstreet	Innovative	Central Region - Central Area	2 Michelin stars
CUT by Wolfgang Puck	Steakhouse	Central Region - Central Area	1 Michelin star
Hamamoto	Japanese	Central Region - Central Area	1 Michelin star
Hill Street Tai Hwa Pork Noodle	Street Food	Central Region - Kallang	1 Michelin star
Iggy's	European	Central Region - Central Area	1 Michelin star
Imperial Treasure Fine Teochew Cuisine	Teochew	Central Region - Central Area	1 Michelin star
Jaan	British	Central Region - Central Area	2 Michelin stars
Jag	French	Central Region - Central Area	1 Michelin star
Jin Ting Wan	Cantonese	Central Region - Central Area	1 Michelin star
Labyrinth	Innovative	Central Region - Central Area	1 Michelin star
Lei Garden	Cantonese	Central Region - Central Area	1 Michelin star
Lerouy	French	Central Region - Central Area	1 Michelin star
Les Amis	French	Central Region - Central Area	3 Michelin stars
Loca Niru	Japanese	Central Region - Central Area	1 Michelin star
Ma Cuisine	French	Central Region - Central Area	1 Michelin star
Marguerite	Australian	Central Region - Central Area	1 Michelin star
Meta	Innovative	Central Region - Central Area	2 Michelin stars
Nae:um	Korean	Central Region - Central Area	1 Michelin star
Nouri	Innovative	Central Region - Central Area	1 Michelin star
Odette	French	Central Region - Central Area	3 Michelin stars
Omakase @ Stevens	Innovative	Central Region - Tanglin	1 Michelin star
Pangium	Peranakan	Central Region - Tanglin	1 Michelin star
Saint Pierre	French	Central Region - Central Area	2 Michelin stars
Seroja	Malaysian	Central Region - Central Area	2 Michelin stars
Shisen Hanten	Sichuan	Central Region - Central Area	1 Michelin star
Shoukouwa	Japanese	Central Region - Central Area	2 Michelin stars
Summer Palace	Cantonese	Central Region - Central Area	1 Michelin star
Summer Pavilion	Cantonese	Central Region - Central Area	1 Michelin star
Sushi Ichi	Japanese	Central Region - Central Area	1 Michelin star
Sushi Kimura	Japanese	Central Region - Central Area	1 Michelin star
Sushi Sakuta	Japanese	Central Region - Central Area	2 Michelin stars
Tenshima	Japanese	Central Region - Central Area	1 Michelin star
Thevar	Innovative	Central Region - Central Area	2 Michelin stars
Waku Ghin	Japanese	Central Region - Central Area	1 Michelin star
Whitegrass	French	Central Region - Central Area	1 Michelin star
Willow	Asian Fusion	Central Region - Central Area	1 Michelin star
Yong Fu	Chinese	Central Region - Central Area	1 Michelin star
Zen	European	Central Region - Central Area	3 Michelin stars
Reference			

== 2016–2025 lists ==
Key
1 Michelin star	One Michelin star
2 Michelin stars	Two Michelin stars
3 Michelin stars	Three Michelin stars
—	The restaurant did not receive a star that year
Closed	The restaurant is no longer open

Michelin-starred restaurants
Name	Cuisine	Location	2016	2017	2018	2019	2021	2022	2023	2024	2025
28 Wilkie	Italian	Central Region - Central Area	—	—	—	—	1 Michelin star	1 Michelin star	1 Michelin star	—	—
Alma by Juan Amador (Note: Restaurant closed in 2025)	European	Central Region - Central Area	1 Michelin star	1 Michelin star	1 Michelin star	1 Michelin star	1 Michelin star	1 Michelin star	1 Michelin star	1 Michelin star	1 Michelin star
Araya	Innovative	Central Region - Central Area	—	—	—	—	—	—	—	1 Michelin star	1 Michelin star
Art	Italian	Central Region - Central Area	—	—	—	—	1 Michelin star	1 Michelin star	1 Michelin star	1 Michelin star	Closed
Basque Kitchen by Aitor	Basque	Central Region - Central Area	—	—	—	1 Michelin star	1 Michelin star	1 Michelin star	1 Michelin star	Closed	
Béni	French/Japanese	Central Region - Central Area	1 Michelin star	1 Michelin star	1 Michelin star	1 Michelin star	1 Michelin star	1 Michelin star	1 Michelin star	Closed	
Born	Innovative	Central Region - Central Area	—	—	—	—	—	—	1 Michelin star	1 Michelin star	1 Michelin star
Braci	Italian	Central Region - Central Area	—	1 Michelin star	1 Michelin star	1 Michelin star	1 Michelin star	1 Michelin star	1 Michelin star	Closed	
Buona Terra	Italian	Central Region - Central Area	—	—	—	1 Michelin star	1 Michelin star	1 Michelin star	1 Michelin star	1 Michelin star	1 Michelin star
Burnt Ends	Barbecue	Central Region - Tanglin	—	—	1 Michelin star	1 Michelin star	1 Michelin star	1 Michelin star	1 Michelin star	1 Michelin star	1 Michelin star
Candlenut	Peranakan	Central Region - Tanglin	1 Michelin star	1 Michelin star	1 Michelin star	1 Michelin star	1 Michelin star	1 Michelin star	1 Michelin star	1 Michelin star	1 Michelin star
Chaleur	Innovative	Central Region - Central Area	—	—	—	—	—	—	—	1 Michelin star	1 Michelin star
Cheek Bistro (Note: Was named Cheek by Jowl until 2018)	Australian	Central Region - Central Area	—	1 Michelin star	1 Michelin star	1 Michelin star	Closed				
Chef Kang's	Cantonese	Central Region - Central Area	—	1 Michelin star	1 Michelin star	1 Michelin star	1 Michelin star	1 Michelin star	1 Michelin star	Closed	
Cloudstreet	Innovative	Central Region - Central Area	—	—	—	—	1 Michelin star	2 Michelin stars	2 Michelin stars	2 Michelin stars	2 Michelin stars
Corner House	French	Central Region - Tanglin	1 Michelin star	1 Michelin star	1 Michelin star	1 Michelin star	1 Michelin star	—	—	Closed	
Crystal Jade Golden Palace	Chinese	Central Region - Central Area	1 Michelin star	1 Michelin star	1 Michelin star	—	—	—	—	—	—
Cure	European	Central Region - Central Area	—	—	—	—	1 Michelin star	1 Michelin star	1 Michelin star	Closed	
CUT by Wolfgang Puck	Steakhouse	Central Region - Central Area	1 Michelin star	1 Michelin star	1 Michelin star	1 Michelin star	1 Michelin star	1 Michelin star	1 Michelin star	1 Michelin star	1 Michelin star
Esora	Innovative	Central Region - Central Area	—	—	—	—	1 Michelin star	1 Michelin star	1 Michelin star	1 Michelin star	1 Michelin star
Euphoria	Innovative	Central Region - Central Area	—	—	—	—	—	1 Michelin star	1 Michelin star	1 Michelin star	1 Michelin star
Forest森	Chinese	Central Region - Southern Islands	1 Michelin star	—	—	—	—	—	—	—	—
Garibaldi	Italian	Central Region - Central Area	—	1 Michelin star	1 Michelin star	1 Michelin star	1 Michelin star	—	—	—	—
Hamamoto	Japanese	Central Region - Central Area	—	—	—	—	—	1 Michelin star	1 Michelin star	1 Michelin star	1 Michelin star
Hill Street Tai Hwa Pork Noodle	Street Food	Central Region - Kallang	1 Michelin star	1 Michelin star	1 Michelin star	1 Michelin star	1 Michelin star	1 Michelin star	1 Michelin star	1 Michelin star	1 Michelin star
Hong Kong Soya Sauce Chicken Rice and Noodle	Street Food	Central Region - Central Area	1 Michelin star	1 Michelin star	1 Michelin star	1 Michelin star	—	—	—	—	—
Iggy's	European	Central Region - Central Area	—	1 Michelin star	1 Michelin star	1 Michelin star	1 Michelin star	1 Michelin star	1 Michelin star	1 Michelin star	1 Michelin star
Imperial Treasure Fine Teochew Cuisine	Teochew	Central Region - Central Area	—	1 Michelin star	1 Michelin star	1 Michelin star	1 Michelin star	1 Michelin star	1 Michelin star	1 Michelin star	1 Michelin star
Jaan	British	Central Region - Central Area	1 Michelin star	1 Michelin star	1 Michelin star	1 Michelin star	2 Michelin stars	2 Michelin stars	2 Michelin stars	2 Michelin stars	2 Michelin stars
Jag	French	Central Region - Central Area	—	—	—	1 Michelin star	1 Michelin star	1 Michelin star	1 Michelin star	1 Michelin star	1 Michelin star
Jiang-Nan Chun (江南春)	Cantonese	Central Region - Central Area	—	—	1 Michelin star	1 Michelin star	—	—	—	—	—
Joël Robuchon Restaurant	French	Central Region - Southern Islands	3 Michelin stars	3 Michelin stars	Closed						
Labyrinth	Innovative	Central Region - Central Area	—	1 Michelin star	1 Michelin star	1 Michelin star	1 Michelin star	1 Michelin star	1 Michelin star	1 Michelin star	1 Michelin star
La Dame de Pic	French	Central Region - Central Area	—	—	—	—	—	1 Michelin star	1 Michelin star	Closed	
L'Atelier de Joël Robuchon	French	Central Region - Southern Islands	2 Michelin stars	2 Michelin stars	Closed						
Lei Garden Restaurant	Cantonese	Central Region - Central Area	1 Michelin star	1 Michelin star	1 Michelin star	1 Michelin star	1 Michelin star	1 Michelin star	1 Michelin star	1 Michelin star	1 Michelin star
Lerouy	French	Central Region - Central Area	—	—	—	1 Michelin star	1 Michelin star	1 Michelin star	1 Michelin star	1 Michelin star	1 Michelin star
Les Amis	French	Central Region - Central Area	2 Michelin stars	2 Michelin stars	2 Michelin stars	3 Michelin stars	3 Michelin stars	3 Michelin stars	3 Michelin stars	3 Michelin stars	3 Michelin stars
Ma Cuisine	French	Central Region - Central Area	—	—	1 Michelin star	1 Michelin star	1 Michelin star	1 Michelin star	1 Michelin star	1 Michelin star	1 Michelin star
Marguerite	Australian	Central Region - Central Area	—	—	—	—	—	1 Michelin star	1 Michelin star	1 Michelin star	1 Michelin star
Matera	Italian	Central Region - Southern Islands	—	—	—	—	—	—	—	1 Michelin star	Closed
Meta	Innovative	Central Region - Central Area	—	1 Michelin star	1 Michelin star	1 Michelin star	1 Michelin star	1 Michelin star	1 Michelin star	2 Michelin stars	2 Michelin stars
Nae:um	Korean	Central Region - Central Area	—	—	—	—	—	1 Michelin star	1 Michelin star	1 Michelin star	1 Michelin star
Nouri	Innovative	Central Region - Central Area	—	—	1 Michelin star	1 Michelin star	1 Michelin star	1 Michelin star	1 Michelin star	1 Michelin star	1 Michelin star
Odette	French	Central Region - Central Area	2 Michelin stars	2 Michelin stars	2 Michelin stars	3 Michelin stars	3 Michelin stars	3 Michelin stars	3 Michelin stars	3 Michelin stars	3 Michelin stars
Omakase @ Stevens	Innovative	Central Region - Tanglin	—	—	—	—	—	—	—	—	1 Michelin star
Oshino	Japanese	Central Region - Central Area	—	—	—	—	1 Michelin star	1 Michelin star	1 Michelin star	1 Michelin star	Closed
Osia Steak and Seafood Grill	Australian	Central Region - Southern Islands	1 Michelin star	1 Michelin star	—	—	—	—	—	—	—
Pangium	Peranakan	Central Region - Tanglin	—	—	—	—	—	—	—	1 Michelin star	1 Michelin star
Poise	European	Central Region - Central Area	—	—	—	—	—	—	1 Michelin star	1 Michelin star	Closed
Putien	Fujian	Central Region - Kallang	1 Michelin star	1 Michelin star	1 Michelin star	1 Michelin star	1 Michelin star	1 Michelin star	1 Michelin star	—	—
Restaurant André	French	Central Region - Central Area	2 Michelin stars	2 Michelin stars	Closed						
Reve	European	Central Region - Central Area	—	—	—	—	—	1 Michelin star	1 Michelin star	Closed	
Rhubarb Le Restaurant	French	Central Region - Central Area	1 Michelin star	1 Michelin star	1 Michelin star	1 Michelin star	1 Michelin star	1 Michelin star	1 Michelin star	1 Michelin star	Closed
Saint Pierre	French	Central Region - Central Area	—	1 Michelin star	1 Michelin star	2 Michelin stars	2 Michelin stars	2 Michelin stars	2 Michelin stars	2 Michelin stars	2 Michelin stars
Seroja	Malaysian	Central Region - Central Area	—	—	—	—	—	—	1 Michelin star	1 Michelin star	1 Michelin star
Shang Palace	Cantonese	Central Region - Tanglin	—	—	—	—	1 Michelin star	1 Michelin star	—	—	—
Shinji by Kanesaka - Carlton Hotel	Japanese	Central Region - Central Area	1 Michelin star	1 Michelin star	1 Michelin star	1 Michelin star	1 Michelin star	1 Michelin star	1 Michelin star	1 Michelin star	Closed
Shinji by Kanesaka - St. Regis	Japanese	Central Region - Central Area	1 Michelin star	1 Michelin star	1 Michelin star	1 Michelin star	1 Michelin star	—	—	—	—
Shisen Hanten	Sichuan	Central Region - Central Area	2 Michelin stars	2 Michelin stars	2 Michelin stars	2 Michelin stars	2 Michelin stars	2 Michelin stars	1 Michelin star	1 Michelin star	1 Michelin star
Shoukouwa	Japanese	Central Region - Central Area	2 Michelin stars	2 Michelin stars	2 Michelin stars	2 Michelin stars	2 Michelin stars	2 Michelin stars	2 Michelin stars	2 Michelin stars	2 Michelin stars
Sommer	European	Central Region - Central Area	—	—	—	—	1 Michelin star	1 Michelin star	1 Michelin star	Closed	
Summer Palace	Cantonese	Central Region - Central Area	—	1 Michelin star	1 Michelin star	1 Michelin star	1 Michelin star	1 Michelin star	1 Michelin star	1 Michelin star	1 Michelin star
Summer Pavilion	Cantonese	Central Region - Central Area	1 Michelin star	1 Michelin star	1 Michelin star	1 Michelin star	1 Michelin star	1 Michelin star	1 Michelin star	1 Michelin star	1 Michelin star
Sushi Ichi	Japanese	Central Region - Central Area	1 Michelin star	1 Michelin star	1 Michelin star	1 Michelin star	1 Michelin star	1 Michelin star	1 Michelin star	1 Michelin star	1 Michelin star
Sushi Kimura	Japanese	Central Region - Central Area	—	—	1 Michelin star	1 Michelin star	1 Michelin star	1 Michelin star	1 Michelin star	1 Michelin star	Closed
Sushi Sakuta	Japanese	Central Region - Central Area	—	—	—	—	—	—	1 Michelin star	1 Michelin star	2 Michelin stars
Table65	European	Central Region - Southern Islands	—	—	—	1 Michelin star	1 Michelin star	1 Michelin star	1 Michelin star	Closed	
Terra	Italian	Central Region - Central Area	1 Michelin star	—	—	1 Michelin star	1 Michelin star	1 Michelin star	1 Michelin star	1 Michelin star	—
The Song of India	Indian	Central Region - Central Area	1 Michelin star	1 Michelin star	1 Michelin star	1 Michelin star	Closed				
Thevar	Innovative	Central Region - Central Area	—	—	—	—	1 Michelin star	2 Michelin stars	2 Michelin stars	2 Michelin stars	2 Michelin stars
Vianney Massot (Note: Was named The Kitchen at Bacchanalia until 2019)	French	Central Region - Central Area	1 Michelin star	1 Michelin star	1 Michelin star	1 Michelin star	—	—	—	—	Closed
Waku Ghin	Japanese	Central Region - Central Area	1 Michelin star	2 Michelin stars	2 Michelin stars	2 Michelin stars	2 Michelin stars	2 Michelin stars	2 Michelin stars	1 Michelin star	1 Michelin star
Whitegrass	French	Central Region - Central Area	—	1 Michelin star	1 Michelin star	Closed		1 Michelin star	1 Michelin star	1 Michelin star	1 Michelin star
Willow	Asian	Central Region - Central Area	—	—	—	—	—	—	1 Michelin star	1 Michelin star	1 Michelin star
Zen	European	Central Region - Central Area	—	—	—	2 Michelin stars	3 Michelin stars	3 Michelin stars	3 Michelin stars	3 Michelin stars	3 Michelin stars
Reference											

== See also ==
- List of Michelin 3-star restaurants
- List of restaurants in Singapore
