= List of restaurants in Singapore =

This is a list of notable restaurants in Singapore.

== Restaurants ==
- Les Amis
- Restaurant André
- Candlenut Kitchen
- Crystal Jade
- Pizza Hut
- McDonald's
- KFC
- Jigger & Pony
- Jollibee
- Ippudo
- Chili's
- Din Tai Fung
- Swensen's
- Jack's Place
- L'Atelier de Joël Robuchon
- Long Beach Seafood Restaurant
- Pastamania
- Rhubarb Le Restaurant
- Sakae Sushi
- 4 Fingers Crispy Chicken
- Itacho Sushi
- Ichiban Boshi
- Ichiban Sushi
- Buddy Hoagies
- Saizeriya
- Gochi-So Shokudo
- Sushiro
- Tempura Makino
- Sushi Express
- Aburi-EN

== Hawker stalls ==
- Hill Street Tai Hwa Pork Noodle
- Hong Kong Soya Sauce Chicken Rice and Noodle

== See also ==
- List of Michelin-starred restaurants in Singapore
- List of restaurants
- Singaporean cuisine
- Gastronomy in Singapore
