= Amoy Street Food Centre =

Hawker centre in Downtown Core, Singapore

- 厦门街熟食中心 (Chinese); Pusat Makanan Jalan Amoy (Malay) அமோய் ஸ்திரீட் உணவு மையம் (Tamil)
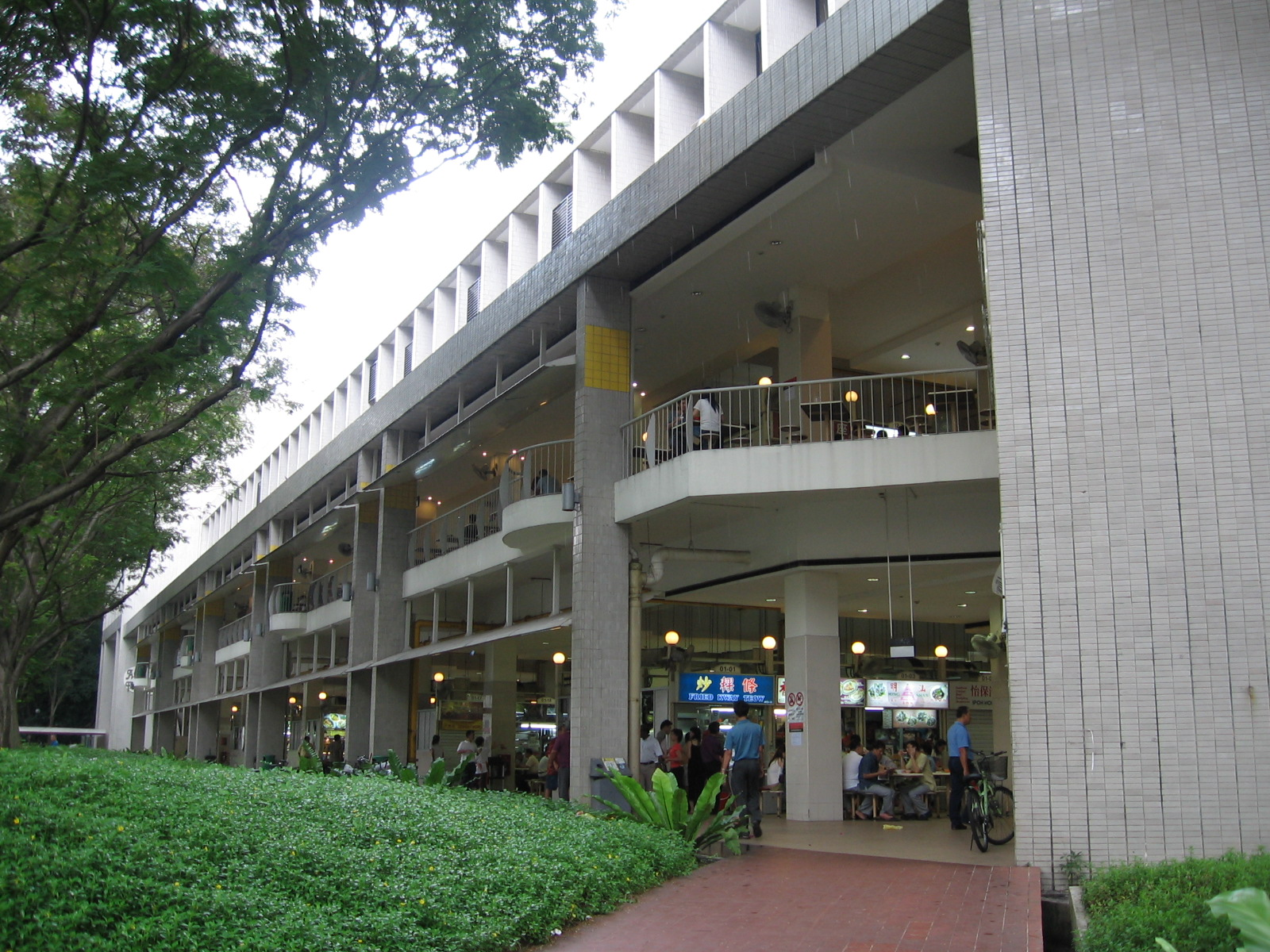
- Amoy Street Food Centre in 2005
- Interactive map of the Amoy Street Food Centre area

General information
- Location: Downtown Core, Singapore, 7 Maxwell Road; 069111
- Coordinates: 1°16′46″N 103°50′46″E
- Opened: 11 April 1983; 43 years ago
- Inaugurated: 19 July 1983; 42 years ago
- Renovated: March 2003; 23 years ago
- Cost: S$5.83 million
- Renovation cost: S$2.8 million
- Landlord: National Environment Agency

Technical details
- Floor area: 3,539 m^{2} (38,090 sq ft)

Renovating team
- Architects: Liu & Wo Architects

Other information
- Number of stores: 134
- Public transit access: EW15 Tanjong Pagar; TE18 Maxwell; DT18 Telok Ayer

Amoy Street Food Centre is a two-storey hawker centre located in Downtown Core, Singapore, at the junction of Telok Ayer Street and Amoy Street. The hawker centre occupies the 1st and 2nd storey of the Ministry of National Development Building Annexe B.

The hawker centre houses numerous restaurants featured in the Michelin Guide, with some being awarded the Bib Gourmand.

== History ==
Amoy Street Food Centre was announced together with four other hawker centres to be constructed in the Central Business District, aimed at serving office workers and relocating street hawkers. On behalf of the Ministry of Environment, construction of 144 stalls by the Housing and Development Board began in 1982 at a cost of S$5.83 million.

On 11 April 1983, the hawker centre was opened to the public, and office workers formed huge crowds. The hawkers were relocated from Stanley Street, Boon Tat Street, Cecil Street, Amoy Street and Telok Ayer Street. On 19 July 1983, the hawker centre was officially opened by Minister for the Environment Ong Pang Boon.

In 1987, Amoy Street was one of the first hawker centres to have signs stating "No Pets". Hawkers shared that patrons sporadically brought pets with them, and allowed the pets to sit next to them. As such, the ministry erected the signs to remind patrons that it is unhygenic and illegal to bring their pets into the hawker centres.

In 1988, the hawker centre was also one of the first three hawker centres to be part of a pilot scheme to allow the disabled to carry out business legally. Previously, some hawkers with disabilities carried out hawking illegally to provide a source of income for themselves.

In February 2002, as part of the hawker centre upgrading programme by the Ministry of Environment, Amoy Street was upgraded, with its tiles, tables and stools being replaced. The toilets, electrical and plumbing systems were also upgraded. With renovation costing S$2.8 million, the hawker centre was closed in September 2002, and reopened in March 2003. On 8 May 2003, the hawker centre was officially reopened by Member of Parliament for Kreta Ayer–Kim Seng Lily Neo. The total number of stalls was reduced to 134.

== Present day ==
Amoy Street remains as a popular hawker centre among officer workers in the vicinity. In 2017, A Noodle Story was awarded the Michelin Bib Gourmand. Other popular stalls include Quan Ji, a tze char stall featured in the Michelin Guide in 2018, and Han Kee, a fish soup bee hoon awarded the Bib Gourmand in 2024.

== See also ==
- Hawker centre
- Singaporean cuisine
