= Tan Ying Hsien =

Singaporean wine critic and former lawyer

Tan Ying Hsien (Chinese: 陈应贤) is a Singaporean wine critic and former lawyer who is the first Singaporean Master of Wine.

== Early life and legal career ==
After his completing his national service, Tan enrolled in King's College London, studying an undergraduate degree in physics. He later left the course to study law instead, subsequently training at Gray's Inn. Tan worked as a lawyer for more than twenty years—becoming the group head of legal and compliance at Standard Chartered Bank as well as a member of the Competition Appeal Board of the Ministry of Trade and Industry.

== Wine career ==
In 2010, Tan began a career transition out of the legal profession and started his own wine bar. After four unsuccessful attempts, Tan qualified as Singapore's first Master of Wine in 2015. Tan is currently a wine consultant at St Pierre, a two-Michelin star French restaurant in Singapore, and has curated pairing lists for two-Michelin star Japanese restaurant Shoukouwa. He is also a wine judge for wine competitions.

== Personal life ==
Tan is the son of Nalla Tan, a Singaporean doctor and sexuality educator. Upon his mother's death, he turned their family home into an art exhibit as tribute to his mother. He is a vegetarian.
