= Les Amis (restaurant) =

Coordinates: 1.3066°N 103.8314°E

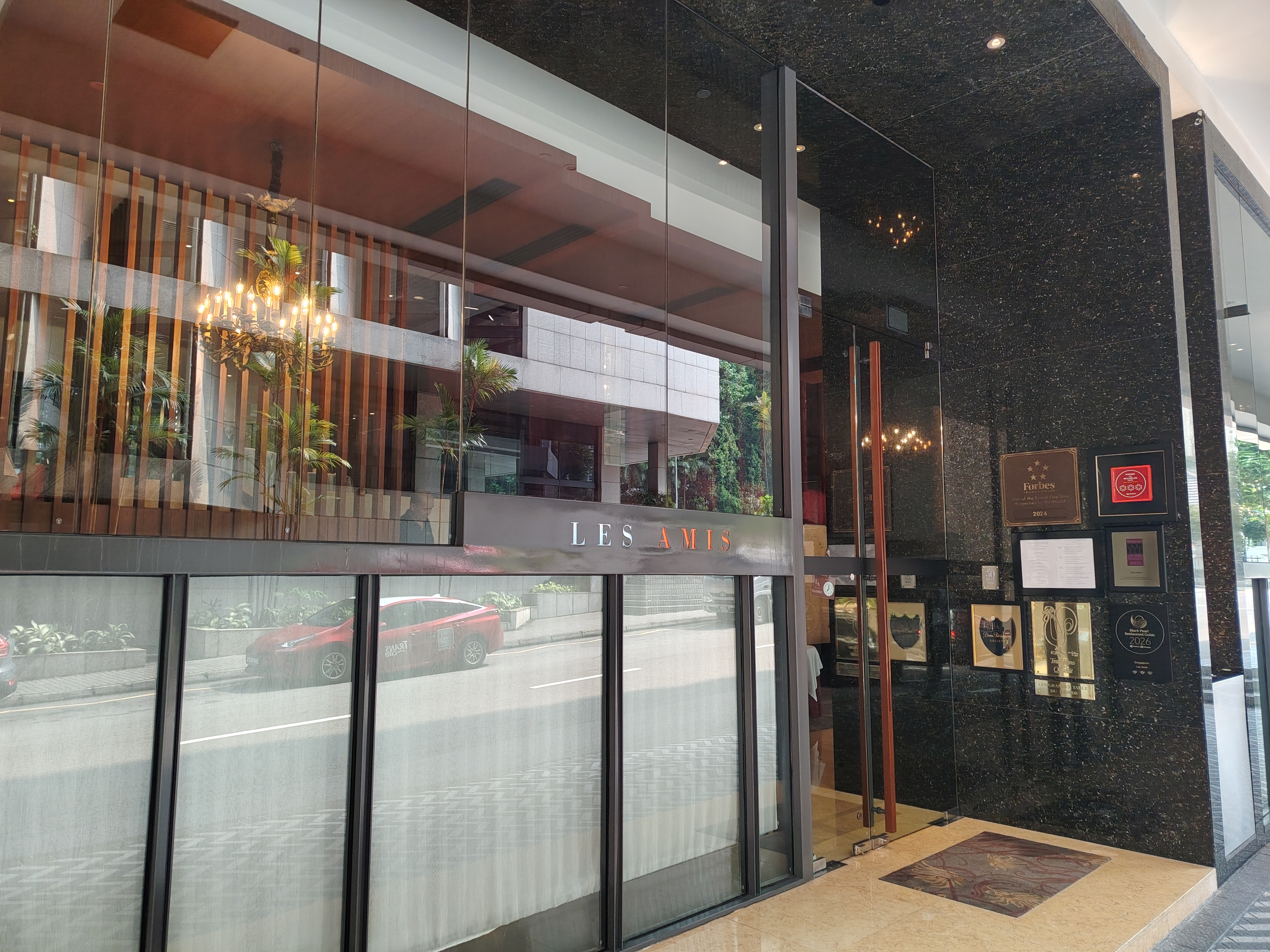
- Entrance
- Interactive map of Les Amis

Restaurant information
- Established: 15 March 1994; 32 years ago
- Owner: Les Amis Group
- Head chef: Sebastien Lepinoy
- Pastry chef: Cheryl Koh
- Food type: French
- Dress code: Smart casual
- Rating: Michelin Guide 2019
- Location: 1 Scotts Road, #01-16 Shaw Centre, 228208, Singapore
- Reservations: Yes
- Other information: Children under 10 are not allowed
- Website: Les Amis

Les Amis is a fine-dining restaurant in Singapore serving French cuisine. The restaurant opened in March 1994 as the flagship of the Les Amis Group. It received its third Michelin star in 2019.

== Cuisine ==
The restaurant specializes in classic French haute cuisine.

== Wines ==
Les Amis has an extensive wine cellar which in 2020 included more than 3000 bottles. Most of the wines are French, mainly Burgundy and Bordeaux.

== Recognition ==
The restaurant was named one of the best in Singapore by The Daily Telegraph in 2016. It was the recipient of the World Gourmet Summit's Wine List of the Year award in multiple years and was inducted into the organization's Awards Of Excellence Hall of Fame in 2009. It was also the recipient of the World Gourmet Summit's Old World Wine List of the Year award multiple times and was inducted into the Awards Of Excellence Hall of Fame in 2014.

In 2013 Restaurant magazine named Les Amis to its inaugural list of the Top 50 Restaurants in Asia and several times thereafter. It named pastry chef Cheryl Koh Asia's Best Pastry Chef in 2016.

The restaurant received two stars in the Michelin Guide's inaugural 2016 Singapore edition. In September 2019 it received a third Michelin star, along with another Singaporean fine-dining French restaurant, Odette.

== Personnel ==
The restaurant was opened in 1994 by restaurateur and sommelier Ignatius Chan and chef Justin Quek with backing from stockbroker Desmond Lim and Chong Yap Seng. In 2003, following the departure of Chan and Quek, Gunther Hubrechsen became chef de cuisine, followed by Thomas Mayr and in 2008 Armin Leitgeb. As of 2013 Sebastien Lepinoy was chef de cuisine and as of 2016 Cheryl Koh the pastry chef.

== See also ==
- List of Michelin-starred restaurants in Singapore
- List of restaurants in Singapore
