= Candlenut Kitchen =

- Interactive map of Candlenut Kitchen

Restaurant information
- Owner: Malcolm Lee
- Head chef: Malcolm Lee
- Food type: Peranakan
- Rating: Michelin Guide 2016
- Location: 17A Dempsey Road, 249676, Singapore
- Coordinates: 1.3057187°N 103.8102043°E
- Reservations: Yes
- Website: Candlenut

Candlenut Kitchen, often known simply as Candlenut, is a Singaporean restaurant serving the local Peranakan cuisine. Located at the Tanglin district, the restaurant is owned by Malcolm Lee, who also serves as its executive chef.

== Overview ==
The restaurant has been featured in various local and overseas publications such as diningcity, United Kingdom's Financial Times and Singapore's 8 Days magazine. Popular dishes include the Buah keluak ice-cream that was named one of SG Magazine's "50 things to eat before you die" in 2013.

== Awards ==
The restaurant received one star in the Michelin Guide's inaugural 2016 Singapore edition, the first ever Michelin star awarded for Peranakan cuisine.

== In popular media ==
- The restaurant was featured and visited by South Korean band Twice for their TWICE TV series (TWICE TV6) when they were in Singapore.

== See also ==
- List of Michelin-starred restaurants in Singapore
- List of restaurants in Singapore
