= Saint Pierre (restaurant) =

- Interactive map of Saint Pierre

Restaurant information
- Established: 2000; 26 years ago
- Owner: Emmanuel Stroobant Group
- Head chef: Emmanuel Stroobant
- Food type: French
- Rating: Michelin Guide 2019
- Location: 1 Fullerton Road, #02-02B, One Fullerton, 049213, Singapore
- Coordinates: 1.2861°N 103.8537°E
- Website: saintpierre.com.sg

Saint Pierre is a Michelin-starred French cuisine restaurant in Singapore. Named after the Saint Pierre Chapel in Notre-Dame de Paris, it serves Asian-French cuisine. It was opened by Belgian-born chef Emmanuel Stroobant and his Malaysian-Chinese wife Edina Hong.

The restaurant first opened at Central Mall in Singapore in December 2000. It is currently located in One Fullerton.

== Description ==
Stroobant and Hong met in Malaysia and after marrying in 1999, they launched Saint Pierre together in Singapore in 2000.

In 2013, Saint Pierre moved to Sentosa’s Quayside Isle and experimented with a more casual dining concept that included a la carte options.

In 2016, the restaurant returned to its fine-dining roots. The restaurant has won many awards and currently holds two stars in the Michelin Guide Singapore.

Chef-owner Emmanuel Stroobant has described his culinary philosophy as ingredient driven, simple, organic and contemporary.

During the COVID-19 pandemic, Saint Pierre experimented with new dining models by launching "virtual dining experiences", giving customers the opportunity to experience the restaurant’s cuisine at home. With food hand-delivered by a waiter dressed in black tie, the head chef greeting diners via a video conference, which could be accessed by friends and family members at different locations.

== Wines ==
Singapore’s first Master of Wine, Tan Ying Hsien oversees the restaurant’s wine programme. Working closely with Emmanuel Stroobant, Tan curates a wine list of over 2,300 bottles and ensures the currency of the wines by the glass and half-bottle.

== Awards and reception ==
In 2017, Saint Pierre received a Michelin star, and in 2019 a second.

In 2007, Saint Pierre was awarded "Le Cordon Bleu restaurant of the Year" by the World Gourmet Summit, where it stated that Stroobant, “brings cuisine alive by "fusing food with elements from different cultures”.

The Peak Magazine recognized Saint Pierre with a “G Restaurant Award” in 2015.

Saint Pierre earned a place on Tatler’s list of 20 best restaurants in Singapore in 2022.

== See also ==
- List of Michelin-starred restaurants in Singapore
- List of restaurants in Singapore
