= Chomp Chomp Food Centre =

Hawker centre in Serangoon, Singapore

- 忠忠熟食中心 (Chinese); Pusat Makanan Chomp Chomp (Malay) சோம்ப் சோம்ப் உணவு மையம் (Tamil)
- Interactive map of the Chomp Chomp Food Centre area
- Former names: Serangoon Garden Food Centre

General information
- Location: Serangoon Gardens, Singapore, 20 Kensington Park Road; 557269
- Coordinates: 1°21′51″N 103°51′59″E
- Opened: 7 May 1972; 54 years ago
- Renovated: 22 April 2004; 22 years ago
- Cost: S$95,000
- Renovation cost: S$6 million
- Landlord: National Environment Agency

Technical details
- Floor area: 613.55 m^{2} (6,604.2 sq ft)

Renovating team
- Architect: CLLA Architects

Other information
- Seating capacity: 394
- Number of stores: 36

Chomp Chomp Food Centre is a hawker centre located in Serangoon Gardens, Singapore. Opened in 1972, Chomp Chomp remains one of Singapore's most popular hawker centres, featuring 36 hawkers.

== History ==
=== Origin, construction and opening ===
In December 1970, Member of Parliament for Serangoon Gardens and Parliament Secretary for Home Affairs Leonard Peter Rodrigo started the project to construct an open air hawker centre at Kensington Park Road, alongside three other projects for his constituency.

The name Chomp Chomp was chosen among the unlicenced street hawkers that used to sell at the nearby Serangoon Garden Circus. Chomp Chomp is a loose adaption of its Teochew name 忠忠, anglicised as Tiong Tiong. The characters stand for loyalty and righteousness.

On 4 May 1972, in preparation for the official opening, students from Serangoon Garden Secondary School assisted to put up the Chomp Chomp signboard and worked on the landscaping.

On 7 May 1972, Chomp Chomp was officially opened by Minister for Law and National Development Edmund W. Barker. Costing S$95,000, the hawker centre housed 36 hawkers.

=== Illegal parking ===
In February 1984, the plan to implement paid parking was announced by the Urban Redevelopment Authority (URA), as residents were unhappy that motorists parked indiscriminately when dining at the hawker centre. However, hawkers from the hawker centre and shopkeepers in the area urged URA to reconsider the plan as they foresaw lesser business if paid parking was implemented. In response, Minister for Foreign Affairs Suppiah Dhanabalan felt that paid parking would instead increase turnover at their stalls and shops, as customers would finish their business before their parking coupon expires, but the stall owners had every right to complain if they experienced a loss of business. As such, starting from 1 March 1984, paid parking was implemented at the hawker centre.

However, due to its close proximity to the hawker centre, more patrons began parking on both sides of Walmer Drive as parking there was free. This resulted in the entrance of road to be often blocked, causing inconvenience to the residents. On 16 April 1984, to prevent drivers from parking along Walmer Drive, the Public Works Department announced that a double yellow line will be drawn on one side of the road.

=== Disposable crockery and cutlery ===
In February 1987, the Ministry of Environment launched a pilot project for hawkers to use disposable polystyrene crockery, plastic cutlery and wooden chopsticks, citing hygiene concerns with existing melamine ware. Chomp Chomp, along with hawker centres at Cuppage, Newton, Whitley and Adam Road, were the ones chosen for the project. Some hawkers interviewed by The Straits Times felt that they had no choice but to abide by the Ministry's wishes. The hawkers also said that there was a 20% to 50% drop in business, and 30% to 50% increase in the cost of disposables. In a quick survey conducted by The Sunday Times, 12 out of 15 patrons said they preferred proper crockery and cutlery. However, in a survey conducted by the Ministry in early 1988, most respondents rated disposable crockery as a "good/very good idea".

Nevertheless, in 1989, Minister for Environment Ahmad Mattar announced that using disposable crockery would not be compulsory, citing complains from hawkers and patrons. As such, almost all the hawkers at Chomp Chomp switched back to using proper crockery and cutlery.

=== Stall ownership scheme ===
In 1994, the Ministry of Environment launched a stall ownership scheme, enabling hawkers to purchase a 20-year lease, allowing them to sell, transfer, or sublet their stalls during the lease period. Costing between S$124,000 and S$138,000, all the hawkers from Chomp Chomp bought their stalls in 1996, making them the first hawker centre to do so under the scheme.

=== Roof construction ===
Being an open air hawker centre, business is affected during rainy and scorching hot days. As such, building a roof was the main concern for hawkers, after they purchased their stalls. On 1 October 1996, Minister for Environment Teo Chee Hean said that his ministry was looking into their concern, and reassured Member of Parliament for Thomson GRC (Serangoon Gardens) Lau Teik Soon that hawkers will be consulted if the roof were to be built. In 1998, at a total cost of S$350,000, a new roof was constructed, along with replacement of plumbing pipes and a change of floor tiles. However, hawkers complained that the new roof was too low, causing trapped heat and rain to splash into the hawker centre. In September 2003, Chomp Chomp was closed for six months, and at a total cost of S$6 million, the old roof was replaced.

== Present day ==
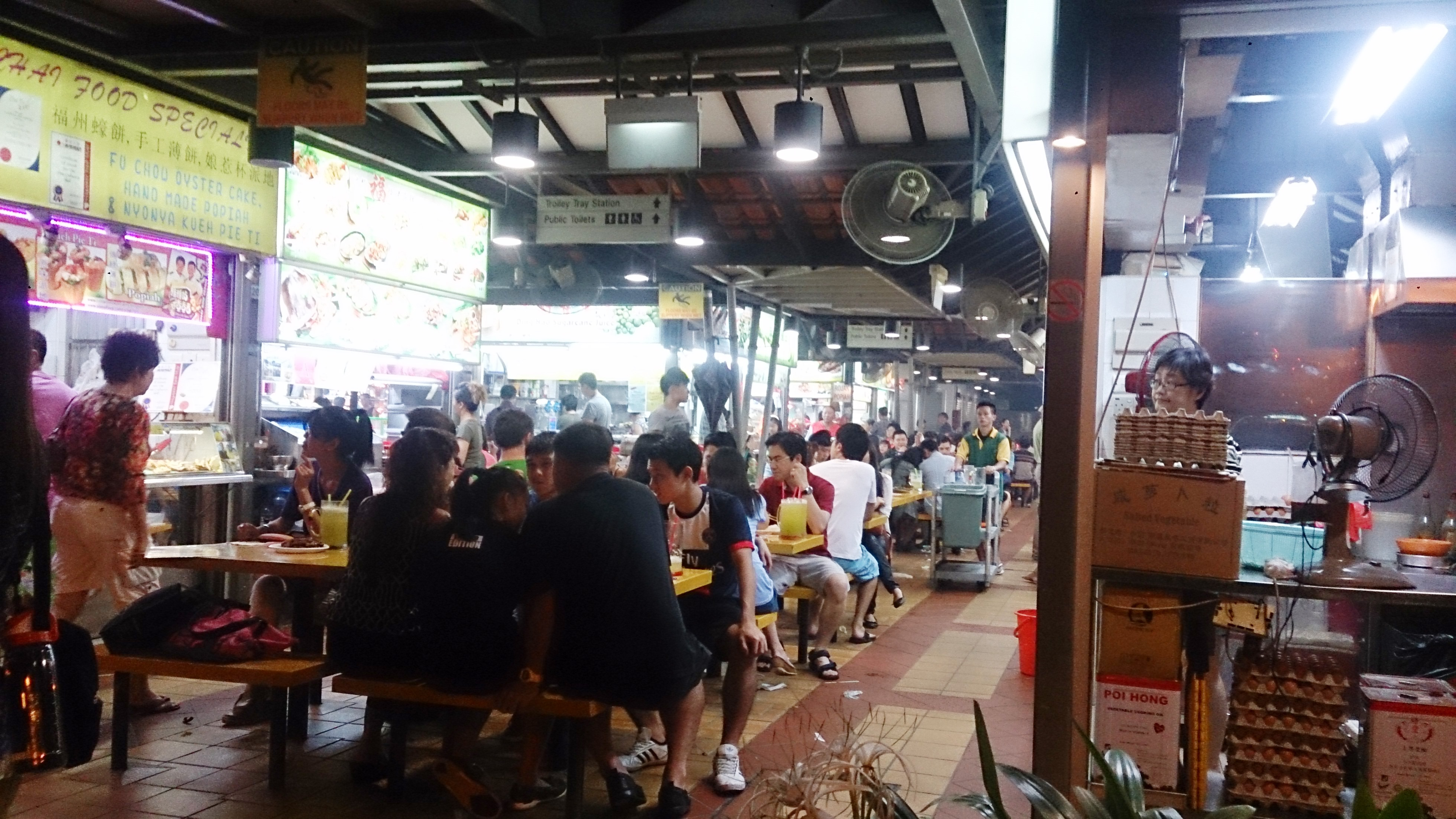
Chomp Chomp in 2013

Chomp Chomp is one of the most popular hawker centres, and it is known for hokkien mee and barbecued seafood.

In July 2018, Chomp Chomp made the headlines after it received a bid of S$10,028 from a woman who wanted to run a drinks stall. However, on 21 August 2018, the woman decided to end the tenancy agreement on the same day she signed it. The National Environment Agency added that the bid was the highest successful bid received, and that it was an outlier.

== See also ==
- Hawker centre
- Singaporean cuisine
