= Emmanuel Stroobant =

Belgian chef and restaurant owner (born 1968)

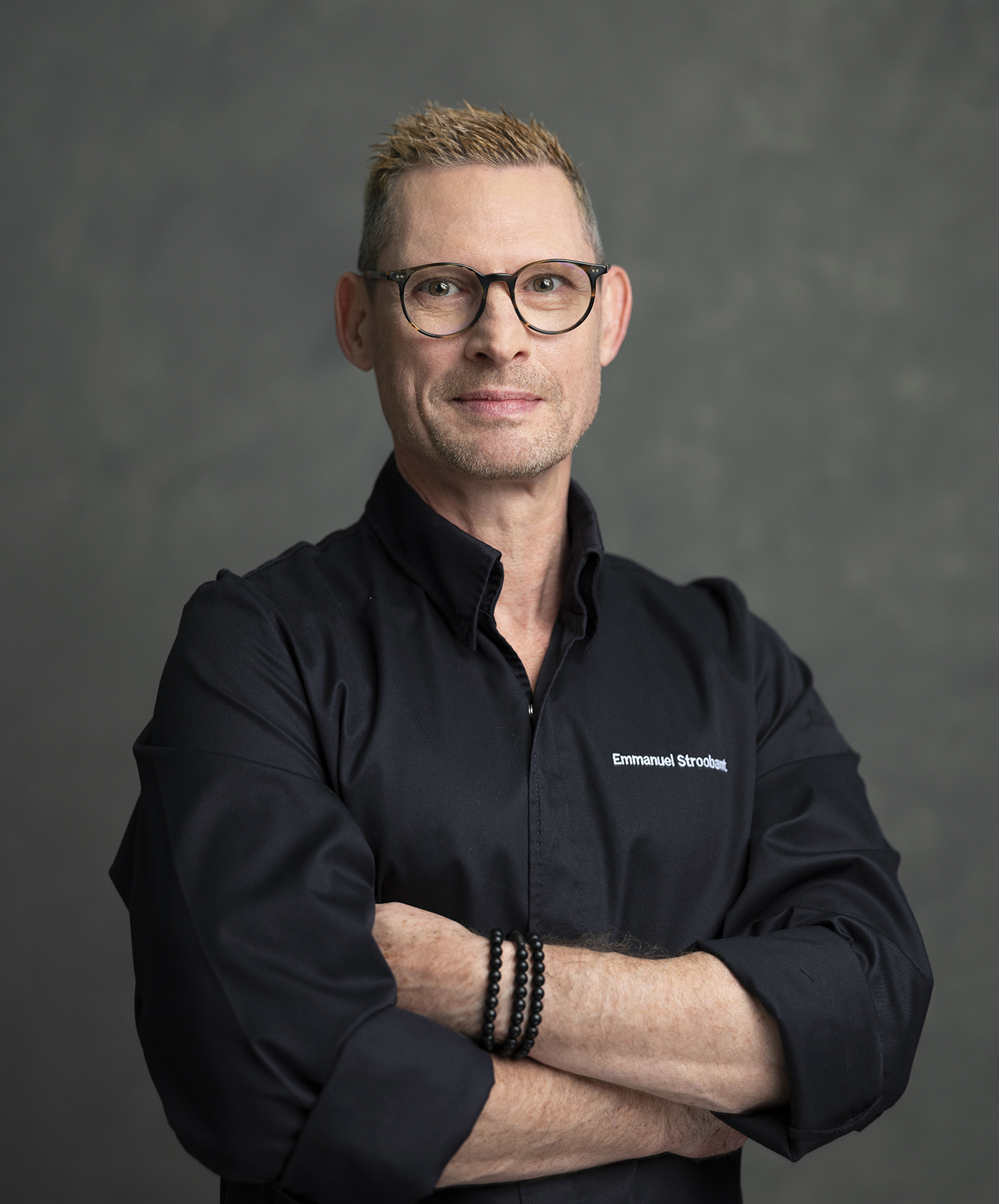
- Born: Emmanuel Jean-Marie Blanche Stroobant Paquet; 1 April 1968 (age 58); Liège, Belgium
- Spouse: Edina Hong
- Children: Mia; Keira
- Culinary career
- Current restaurant(s): Saint Pierre, Shoukouwa, Kingdom of Belgians

Emmanuel Jean-Marie Blanche Stroobant Paquet (born April 1, 1968) is a Belgian-born chef and restaurant owner based in Singapore. He is the owner of restaurants Saint Pierre, Shoukouwa, and Kingdom of Belgians. Saint Pierre and Shoukouwa both hold two Michelin stars from Michelin Guide Singapore.

Stroobant is also the author of two books, and has been featured in two television series, including the cooking show Chef in Black, which he hosted.

== Early career ==
As a teenager, Stroobant's first job in the food industry was merely a means for paying for university, as he had planned to study law. Exposed to the restaurant work environment, Stroobant decided to become a chef. He went on to train at several Michelin-starred restaurants before opening his first restaurant at age 23 in the town of Liège, Belgium. Stroobant's training included working under mentor chefs Pierre Romeijer of three Michelin-starred Maison de Bouche, and Francis Dernouchamp of two Michelin-starred l'Hostellerie Saint-Roch.

Stroobant then moved to Australia where he stayed for a few years working for restaurants in Sydney, Perth, and Canberra. It was in Australia that he learned about Asian food and ingredients and began to incorporate these into his own cuisine.

In 2000, Stroobant moved to Singapore and launched French fine dining restaurant Saint Pierre, where he retains the role of Chef-Owner. Stroobant has described his cooking style as evolving from an extremely classical French background to one that now incorporates Asian influences, particularly through the use of Japanese ingredients.

Since 2000, Stroobant has opened additional restaurants, an institutional catering business, and a culinary school.

== Career ==
Stroobant has opened several restaurants including Saint Pierre, Shoukouwa, Kingdom of Belgians, and SQUE. In 2005, he took over the Lighthouse restaurant at the Fullerton Hotel, renaming it San Marco, and opened Townhouse, a pub.

=== Mycelium Catering ===
Mycelium Catering is an institutional catering business owned and operated by Stroobant. Its clients include the XCL World Academy international school and the EHL Hospitality Business School, where it operates the schools’ canteens.

== Awards ==
2002: World Gourmet Summit Chef of the Year

2006: San Pellegrino Chef of the Year

== Personal life ==
Stroobant is married to Edina Hong, who he met in Kuala Lumpur after arriving from Australia. They live in a condominium in River Valley. He is a vegetarian.
