= Cheryl Koh =

Singaporean pastry chef

- Born: 1980 or 1981 (age 45–46)
- Education: National University of Singapore
- Culinary career
- Cooking style: French pastry
- Current restaurants: Les Amis; Tarte by Cheryl Koh
- Award won: Asia's Best Pastry Chef 2016

Cheryl Koh (born c. 1981) is a Singaporean pastry chef who works at French restaurant Les Amis in Singapore. She was named Asia's Best Pastry Chef 2016 by The World's 50 Best Restaurants.

== Education ==
Cheryl Koh attended St Nicholas Girls' School and Catholic Junior College, and then the National University of Singapore where she studied Geography and European Studies.

== Career ==
After graduating from university, she started working full time in the kitchen of Raffles Hotel, having worked there part time as a student. She worked there for a year, and decided to pursue a career in professional kitchens. She then moved to Paris, where she worked in the restaurant Lasserre.

After a further two years, she moved to Dubai and worked at the Burj Al Arab hotel. Then a stint at the Don Alfonso 1890 restaurant in Italy was followed by working at the Mandarin Oriental, Hong Kong and the restaurant Cepage. When that restaurant closed, she relocated to Les Amis in Singapore, another restaurant in the same group. Under the same group as the restaurant, she has also opened a dessert only restaurant called Tarte by Cheryl Koh.

== Recognition ==
In 2016, Koh was named Asia's Best Pastry Chef by The World's 50 Best Restaurants.
