= Shoukouwa =

- Interactive map of Shoukouwa

Restaurant information
- Established: 2016
- Owner: Emmanuel Stroobant Group
- Head chef: Kazumine Nishida
- Food type: Japanese sushi
- Rating: Michelin Guide 2021
- Location: 1 Fullerton Road, #02-02A, One Fullerton, 049213, Singapore
- Coordinates: 1.2861°N 103.8542°E
- Website: www.shoukouwa.com.sg

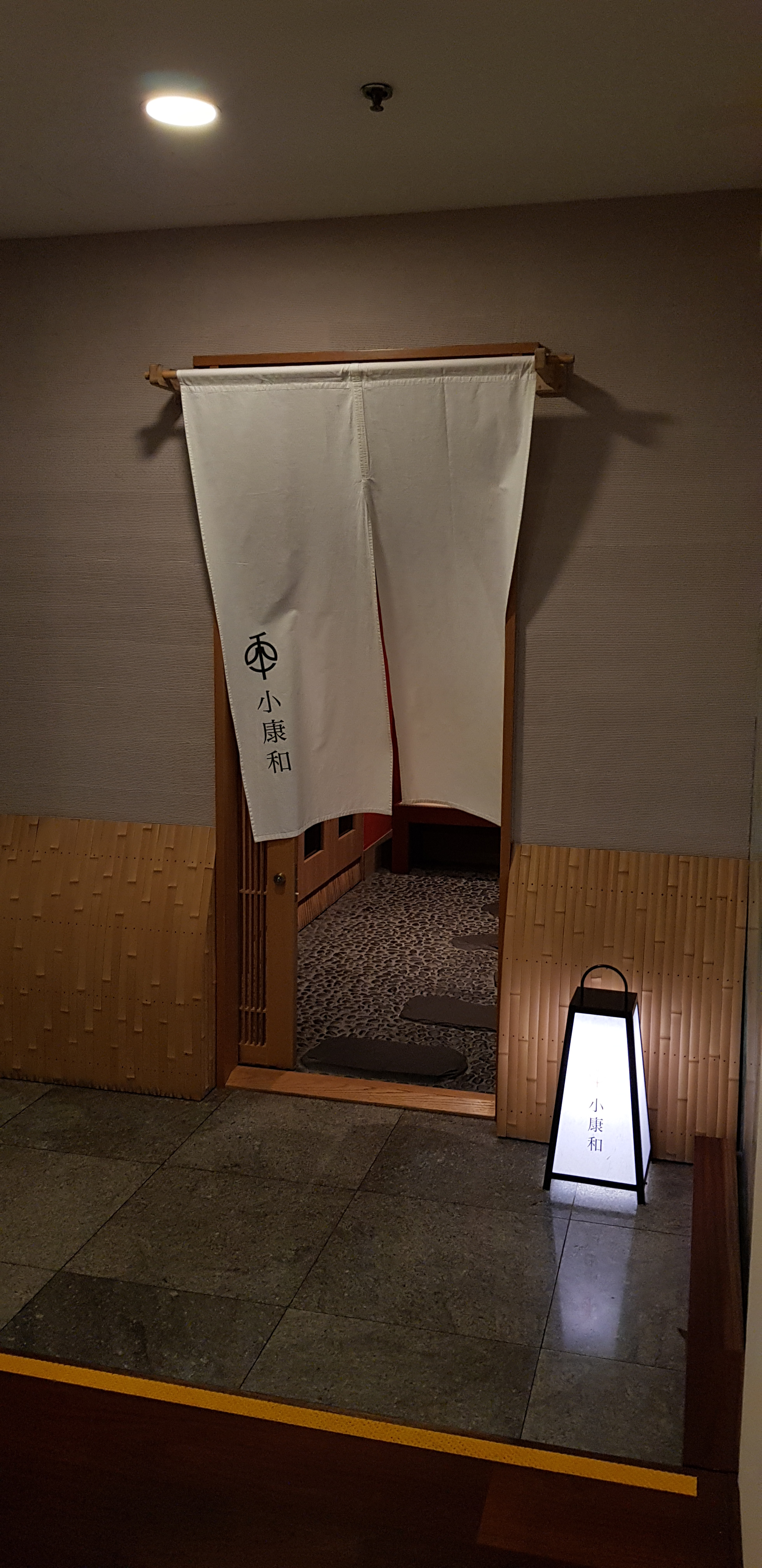
The entrance of Shoukouwa in One Fullerton, 2024

Shoukouwa is a two Michelin-starred Japanese sushi restaurant in Singapore. The restaurant serves traditional edomae-style sushi courses with ingredients imported from Japan four times per week.

Shoukouwa was opened by Belgium-born chef Emmanuel Stroobant in 2016. Kazumine Nishida currently serves as the restaurant's head chef. It is located in One Fullerton, adjacent to Stroobant's French restaurant, Saint Pierre.

When the restaurant launched in 2016, the Michelin Guide of Singapore noted that only four months after opening, “Shoukouwa sushi restaurant became the only Japanese restaurant in Singapore to be awarded 2 Michelin stars”.
