= Rhubarb Le Restaurant =

Coordinates: 1.2794187°N 103.8430149°E

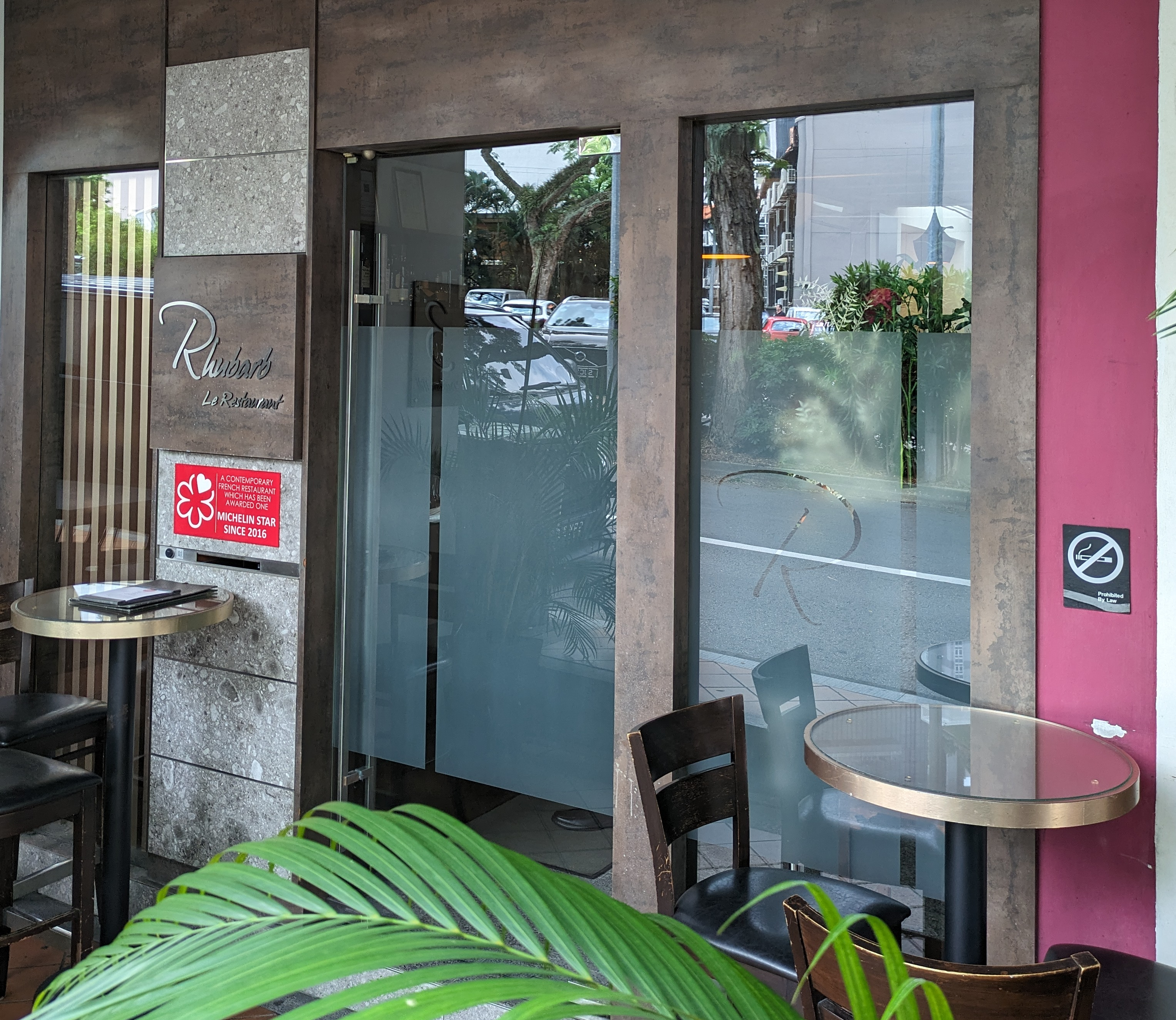
- Interactive map of Rhubarb Le Restaurant

Restaurant information
- Established: 2014; 12 years ago
- Owners: Paul Longworth, Jerome Desfonds, Au Petit Salut (The Salut Group)
- Head chef: Paul Longworth
- Food type: French
- Dress code: Smart casual
- Rating: Michelin Guide 2016
- Location: 3 Duxton Hill, 089589, Singapore
- Seating capacity: 30
- Reservations: Yes
- Other information: Children under 8 are not allowed
- Website: Rhubarb Le Restaurant

Rhubarb Le Restaurant is a restaurant in Singapore serving French cuisine and wine. The restaurant is a joint venture between manager Jerome Desfonds and chef de cuisine Paul Longworth.

The restaurant has been featured in various local publications such as The Straits Times, SG Magazine, Today and Time Out magazine. Their signature dish is the pigeon with rhubarb and rose purée.

== Awards ==
The restaurant has retained one star since the Michelin Guide's inaugural 2016 Singapore edition.

== See also ==
- List of Michelin starred restaurants in Singapore
- List of restaurants in Singapore
