= Hong Kong Soya Sauce Chicken Rice and Noodle =

Street food stall in Singapore

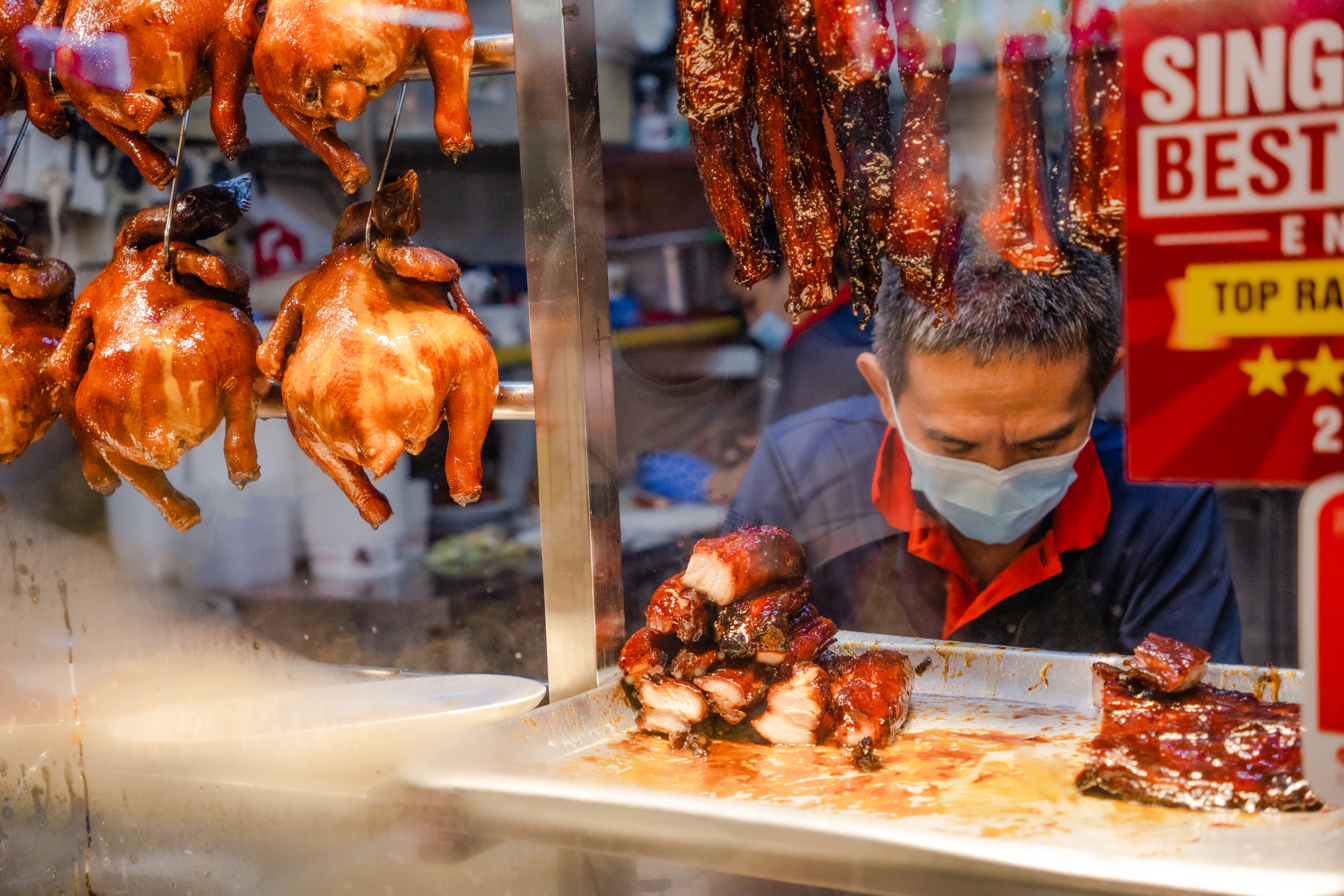
- Interactive map of Hong Kong Soya Sauce Chicken Rice and Noodle

Restaurant information
- Head chef: Chan Hon Meng
- Food type: Street food
- Rating: (2016–2020)
- Location: Block 335 Smith St, #02-126, Chinatown Food Complex, Outram Planning Area, 050335, Singapore
- Coordinates: 1.282615°N 103.843048°E

Hong Kong Soya Sauce Chicken Rice and Noodle
- Simplified Chinese: 香港油鸡饭·面
- Traditional Chinese: 香港油雞飯·麵
Transcriptions
Standard Mandarin
- Hanyu Pinyin: Xiānggǎng Yóujī Fàn Miàn
Yue: Cantonese
- Jyutping: hoeng1 gong2 jau4 gai1 faan6 min6

Hong Kong Soya Sauce Chicken Rice and Noodle (simplified Chinese: 香港油鸡饭·面; traditional Chinese: 香港油雞飯·麵) is a street food stall in Outram, Singapore. It is owned and run by Chan Hon Meng. In 2016, the stall became one of the first two street food locations in the world to be awarded a star in the Michelin Guide, although it lost its star in 2021. It has since become internationally franchised under the English name Hawker Chan.

== Description ==
Hong Kong Soya Sauce Chicken Rice and Noodle is a street food stall, one of over 6,000 such stalls within Singapore. It is owned and run by Chan Hon Meng, and has a signature dish of soy sauce chicken served with rice. On average it sells around 150 lunch chicken dishes each day; as of 2016, these dishes were priced at S$2. It is staffed by Chan and his two assistants. The stall itself is fairly typical for those in Singaporean hawker centres, featuring a neon sign and rows of hanging cooked chickens. Chan later opened a restaurant at 78 Smith Street named Hawker Chan Soya Sauce Chicken Rice & Noodle.

== Reception ==
The stall became one of the first two street food stalls in the world to be awarded a Michelin Star, alongside Hill Street Tai Hwa Pork Noodle, gaining the recognition in the 2016 list for Singapore. This was the first time that Singapore had a Michelin Guide created for it. However, Hong Kong Soya Sauce Chicken Rice and Noodle failed to retain its one Michelin star in the 2021 list. The restaurant was later included in the Michelin Bib Gourmand.

Chan expressed hope that the award would encourage more young people to enter similar businesses, as he was concerned that many stalls were run by elderly chefs who had no successors. Following the announcement of the Michelin star, the queues at the food stall increased in length and a two-hour wait was not uncommon. Sales also increased, from the previous average of 150 dishes per lunchtime to around 180. Chan said that he would not increase the prices of his dishes, saying "it’s not fair to raise them just because I won an award, in fact, my suppliers have increased prices four times in the last seven years and I’ve not changed my prices at all. I will continue trying to absorb the price increases until I really can’t do it."

== See also ==
- List of Michelin starred restaurants in Singapore
