= Iggy's =

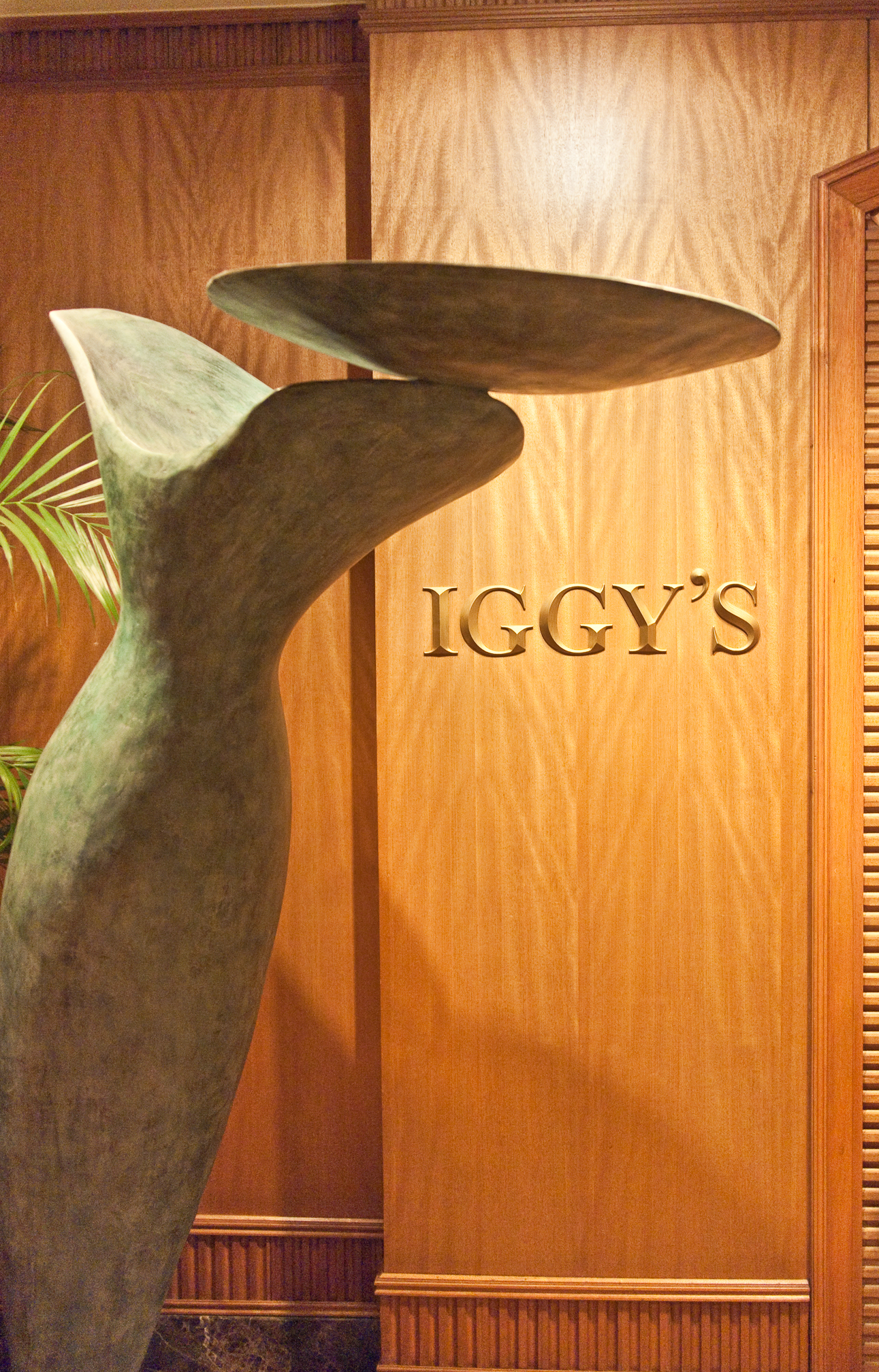
- The entrance of the restaurant

- The location of the voco Orchard Singapore in Singapore, within which the restaurant is located

Restaurant information
- Established: 2004
- Owner: Ignatius Chan
- Food type: Modern European cuisine
- Rating: (Singapore 2017)
- Location: voco Orchard Singapore; 581 Orchard Road, 238881, Singapore
- Coordinates: 1.305881°N 103.829359°E
- Seating capacity: Ten tables
- Website: www.iggys.com.sg

Iggy's is a restaurant in Singapore which serves Modern European cuisine. It has been named in The World's 50 Best Restaurants since 2009, including the best Asian restaurant in 2012. It was awarded one star in the 2017 Singapore edition of the Michelin Guide. It has been named as the best restaurant in Asia by the Miele Guide on three occasions.

== Description ==
Iggy's was opened in 2004 by owner and chef/sommelier Ignatius Chan. The restaurant was originally located in The Regent Hotel but moved to the voco Orchard Singapore at 581 Orchard Road. The restaurant only had ten tables at each of the two locations, but after moving to its present location, it added an eight-seat dessert bar. There are sixteen chefs in the kitchen. The restaurant is able to offer a scholarship at the Singapore Institute of Technology.

=== Menu ===
The restaurant's menu does not follow a particular style of cuisine but instead serves a fusion from different European nations with Asian twists influenced by seasonal produce. The majority of the produce for the restaurant is imported from Japan. Main courses include wagyu beef tongue served with three types of peppers, microgreens, yuzu mustard, and an avocado mousse. A signature dessert served by the restaurant is pound cake accompanied by flavors of Earl Grey tea, milk, and "crumble".

== Reception ==
Frommer's described Iggy's as "deliciously exclusive", providing "culinary works of art" alongside an "exceptional" wine list. CNN Travel said that the lunch menu was of particularly good value and highlighted the tuna carpaccio, pork cheek tagliatelle, and piña colada soufflé dishes.

The restaurant was voted 45th best in the world in The World's 50 Best Restaurants 2009 and rose to 28th in 2010. It rose a single place in 2011, and again to 26th in 2012. It was awarded the title of Best Restaurant in Asia in 2012. Named number one in the Miele Guide of Asia's Top 20 restaurants in 2008, with the two Michelin starred L'Atelier de Joël Robuchon in Hong Kong named as the runner-up. And was named on two more occasions since. Aun Koh, the founder of the Miele Guide has described Iggy's concepts as "setting standards regionally and internationally".
