= Hawker centre =

Open-air food court in Asia

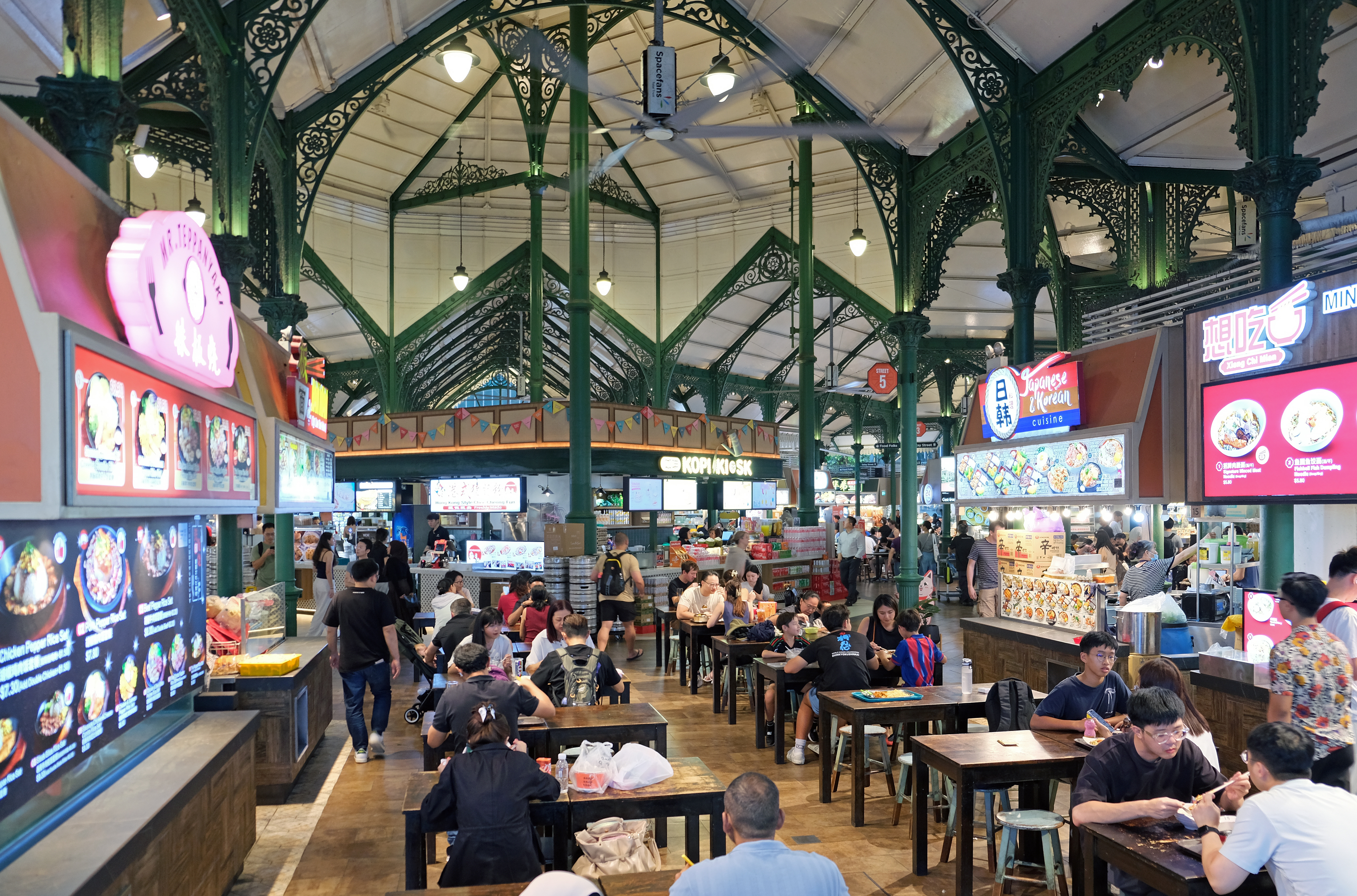
- Interior of Lau Pa Sat, Singapore

Chinese name
- Traditional Chinese: 小販中心
- Simplified Chinese: 小贩中心
Transcriptions
Standard Mandarin
- Hanyu Pinyin: Xiǎofàn Zhōngxīn
Yue: Cantonese
- Jyutping: siu2 faan2 zung1sam1

Malay name
- Malay: Pusat penjaja

Tamil name
- Tamil: ஹாக்கர் மையங்கள்

A hawker centre (simplified Chinese: 小贩中心; traditional Chinese: 小販中心), or cooked food centre (Chinese: 熟食中心), is an often open-air food-court complex commonly found in Hong Kong, Malaysia, Singapore, and Indonesia. They are intended to provide a more sanitary alternative to mobile hawker carts and contain many stalls that sell different varieties of affordable meals. Tables and chairs are usually provided for diners.

Such centres are typically managed by a governing authority that maintains the facility and rents out stalls for hawkers to sell their goods.

== By countries or regions ==
=== Hong Kong ===
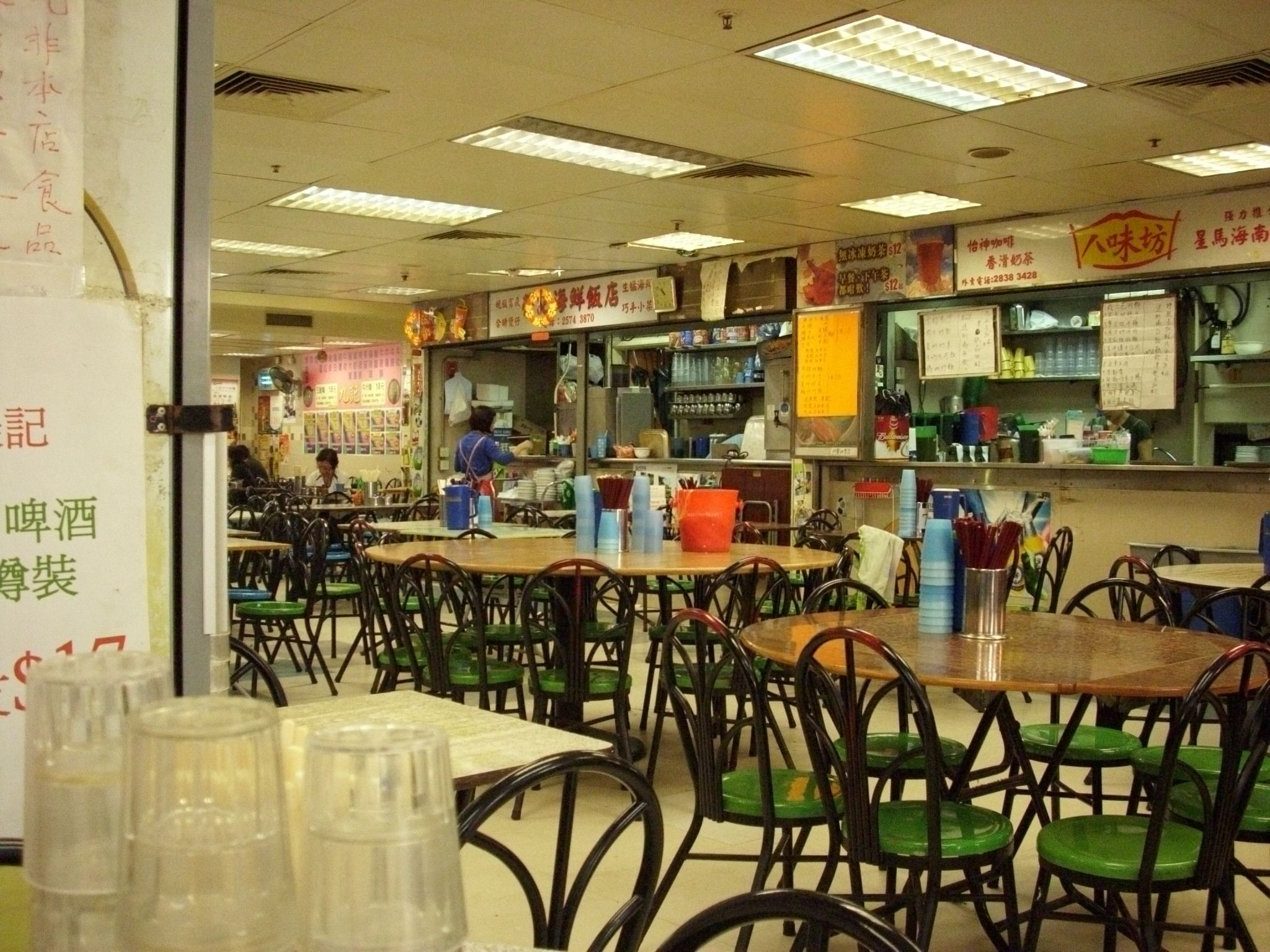
Bowrington Food Centre, a famous hawker centre in Hong Kong's Wan Chai district

In Hong Kong, most cooked food centres (熟食中心; or cooked food markets, 熟食市場) are either located in market complexes of residential districts, or as a standalone structure (this being the case in most industrial areas), with only a few exceptions (e.g. Mong Kok Cooked Food Market is located in the lower levels of Langham Place Hotel). Cooked food centres are managed by Food and Environmental Hygiene Department.

Most of the stalls from hawker centres are converted from former dai pai dong (cooked food stalls) by strict regulations and management; the Hong Kong Government regarded the provision of cooked food centres as a way to eliminate traditional dai pai dongs from local streets in the 1970s. During the industrial boom in the 1960s and 1970s, the government also built cooked food markets in industrial areas to serve the catering needs of the working class in major industrial centres such as Kwun Tong, Tsuen Wan and Fo Tan.

Stalls in cooked food centres usually provide local cuisine, with those selling exotic delicacies a minority.

While many cooked food centres in Hong Kong are open-air, many others are indoor air-conditioned complexes, owing to Hong Kong's periods of extreme humidity.

=== Malaysia ===
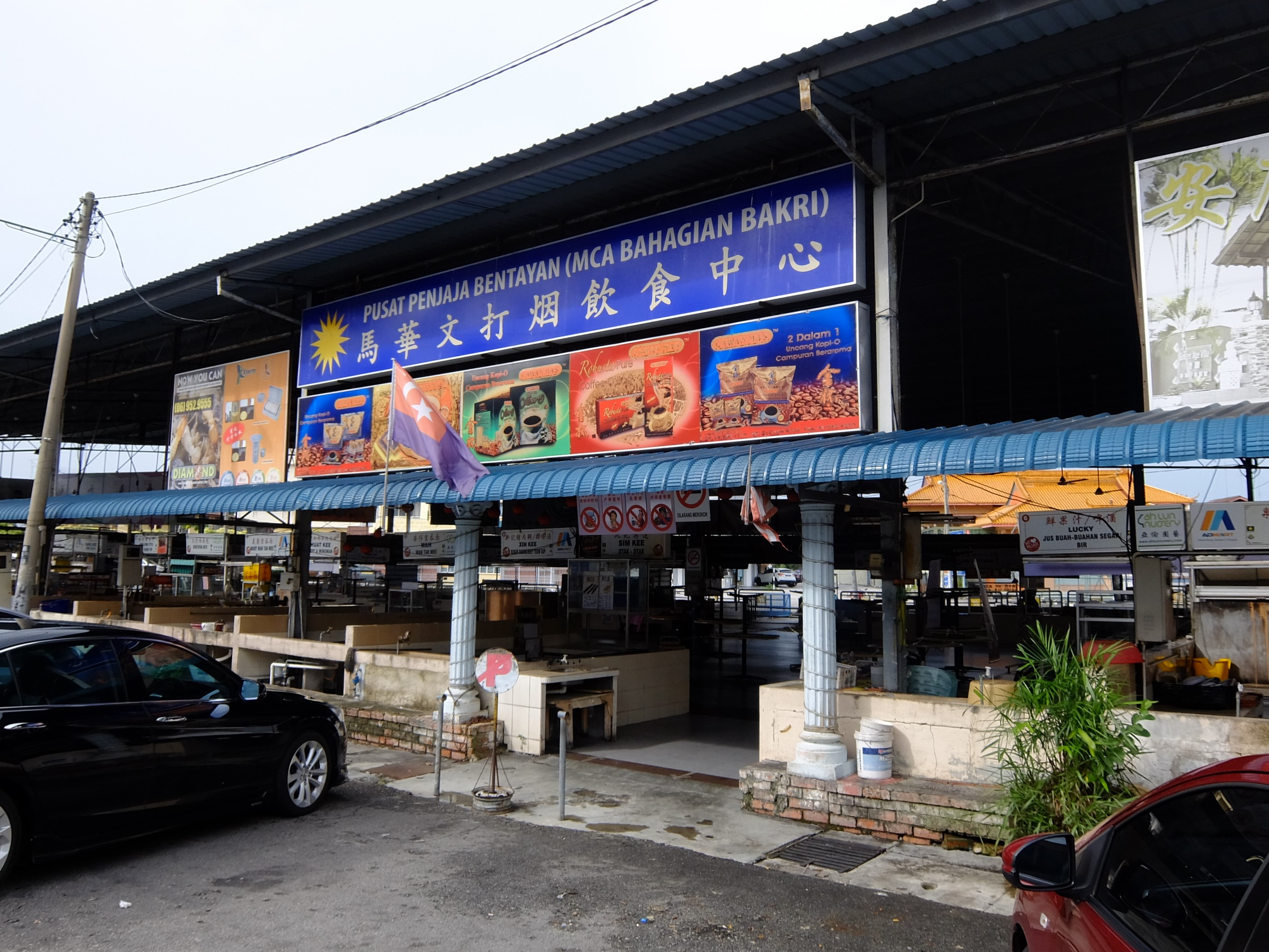
A hawker center in Johor, Malaysia.

During the 1950s, the British were concerned about the economic influence of the hawkers and kept them under surveillance. In response to the government's plan to curb the activities of the Kuala Lumpur Hawkers and Petty Traders Association, its members threatened to take up arms and participate in the Malayan Emergency against the government, leading the latter to back down.

In the next decade, the association became part of the system and actively promoted the hawkers' interests where necessary. By the 1960s, however, the authorities began to crack down on illegal activities and unlicensed hawkers. Health and safety considerations also became paramount to the authorities as the hawkers had little sanitary considerations and frequently occupied the streets with their wares, even after being fined.

In 1967, the first two hawker centers in Malaysia were built in Kuala Lumpur as part of a programme to improve hygiene standards and clear the roads of streetside stores. While initially reluctant, the hawkers eventually moved to these facilities. However, many continue to operate in other areas, with operation in hawker centres being one of seven types of hawker licences issued by Kuala Lumpur.

In the state of Penang, most hawkers were also moved into fixed locations as hygiene and traffic concerns grew. Some temporary or mobile fixtures remain, however licences to do so can only be renewed, with no new licences for mobile hawking being offered. Moving to fixed locations is often unpopular with hawkers, who fear losing customers and the higher fees needed. Labour shortages in the 1980s and 1990s led to many hawker centres being staffed by foreigners. In 2014, after it was reported that in 68 hawker centres 119 foreign cooks were identified, a law banning foreign cooks was proposed and gathered support, finally being passed in 2016. This was purported as a move to protect Penang's heritage, and 13 dishes were declared by the government as heritage dishes; 10 were of Chinese origin, 2 of Tamil origin, and 1 of Malay origin. Foreigners were still able to work as assistants, or as cooks in restaurants.

Cooks working in hawker centres are mainly older individuals, challenging the sustainability of the business. Hawking is viewed, including by many hawkers, as low-status and low-paying. The COVID-19 pandemic led to further challenges. The Penang government pledged to restore the Gurney Drive hawker centre, considered the most well-known, which had previously relied on both domestic and international tourists. Overall business in Penang's hawker centres decreased by 50%, as national regulations limited their opening hours.

=== Singapore ===
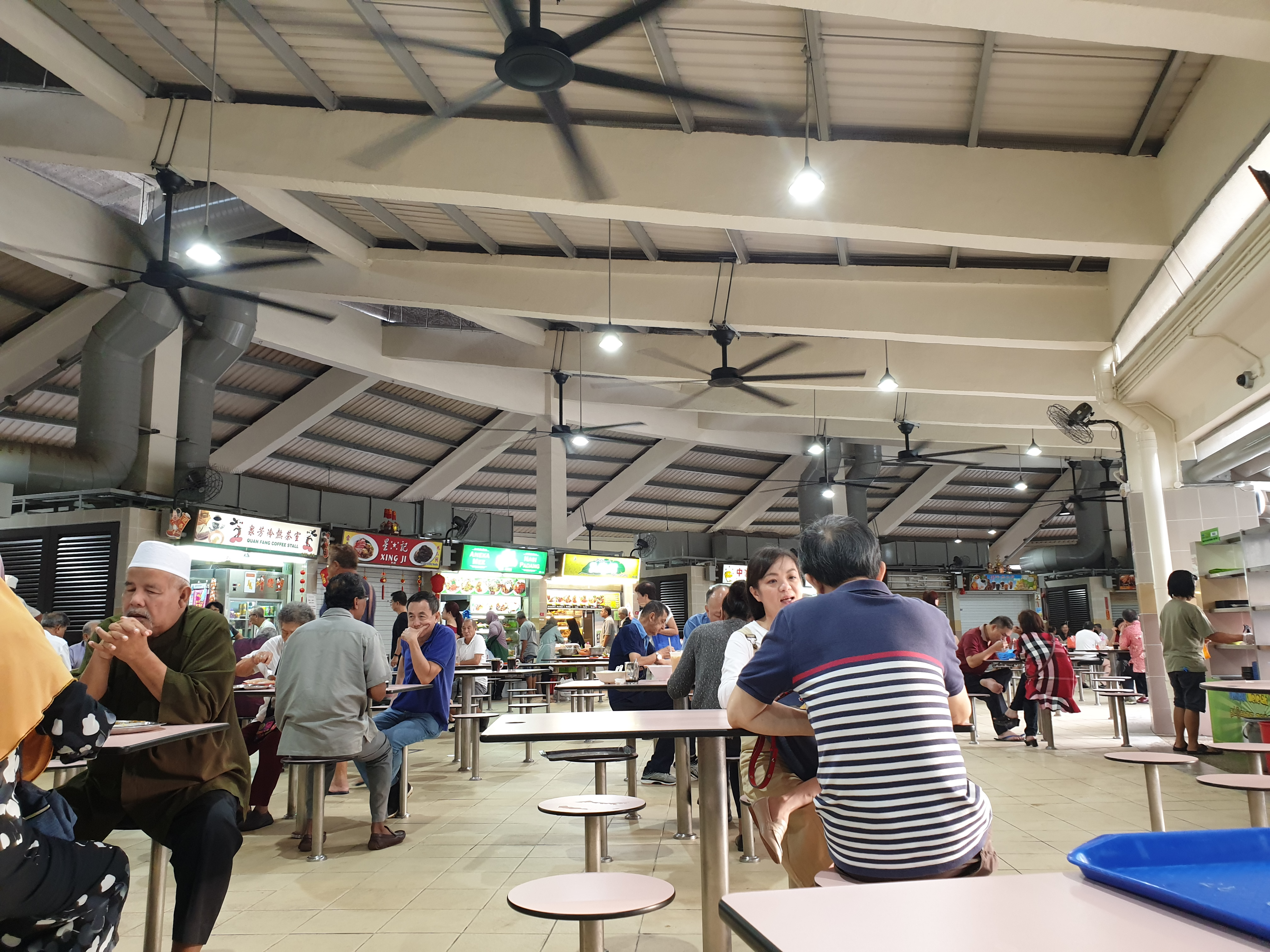
A hawker centre in Singapore.

Hawker centres sprang up in urban areas following the rapid urbanisation in the 1950s and 1960s. In many cases, they were built partly to address the problem of unhygienic food preparation by unlicensed street hawkers. In Singapore today, besides hawker centres, there are also increasing numbers of food courts, which are indoor, air-conditioned versions of hawker centres located in shopping malls and other commercial venues.

In the 1950s and 1960s, hawker centres were considered to be a venue for the less affluent. They had a reputation for unhygienic food, partly due to the frequent appearance of stray domestic pets and pests. Many hawker centres were poorly managed by their operators, often lacking running water and proper facilities for cleaning. More recently, hygiene standards have improved, with pressure from the local authorities. This includes the implementation of licensing requirements, where a sufficient standard of hygiene is required for the stall to operate, and rewarding exceptionally good hygiene. A score of 85% or higher results in an A, and the lowest grade is a D, which ranges from 40 to 49% passing standards. These grades are required to be displayed on hawker stalls. Upgrading or reconstruction of hawker centres was initiated in the 1990s in Singapore.

In 1987, a point demerit system was introduced to measure stands' food and hygiene. Six demerit points result in a high fee. Individual fines will be imposed for larger violations such as putting unclean materials in contact with the food. Failure to display issued license will result in a S$200 fine.

The hawker centres in Singapore are owned by three government bodies, namely the National Environment Agency (NEA) under the parent Ministry of Sustainability and the Environment (MSE), Housing and Development Board (HDB) and JTC Corporation and private operators. All the centres owned by HDB and NEA, in turn, are regulated by NEA with the individual Town Councils managing the HDB owned centres. JTC owned centres are self-managed.

In 2011, Singapore announced plans to develop 10 hawker centres, which equates to 600 stalls in the next decade. It was expected to stabilise food prices and reduce rent of hawker stalls over time.

As of 2016, two Singaporean food stalls, both located in hawker centres, became the first street food vendors to be awarded a Michelin Star for excellence in eating. The two stalls are Hong Kong Soya Sauce Chicken Rice and Noodle and Hill Street Tai Hwa Pork Noodle. Hawker Chan later lost its star in 2021, so only one hawker in Singapore has a Michelin Star as of 2025. As of 2019, more than 40 hawker stalls were awarded Michelin Star and Bib Gourmand in Singapore. In 2023, they already constituted the majority of the list.

In July 2018, a woman made the highest successful bid of $10,028 for a stall at Chomp Chomp Food Centre. However, on 21 August, the woman decided to end the tenancy agreement on the same day she signed it. The NEA confirmed that the bid was the highest successful bid received, and that it was an outlier.

In 2019, Singapore submitted its nomination to inscribe its hawker culture on the UNESCO Representative List of the Intangible Cultural Heritage of Humanity. Inscription was announced on 16 December 2020, when UNESCO described the hawker centre as "'community dining rooms' where people from diverse backgrounds gather and share the experience of dining over breakfast, lunch and dinner."

From September 2019, rentals for stalls in new hawker centres are staggered with stallholders paying 80 per cent of the stall's rental in the first year, and 90 per cent in the second year before paying the full rental onwards.

Since 1 September 2021, it has been illegal to leave behind food trays, crockery, used tissues, wet wipes, drink straws, food wrappers, drink cans, plastic water bottles, food remnants and any other litter at hawker centres under Singapore's Environmental Public Health Act with this law being extended to food courts and coffeeshops from 1 January 2022. Prior to 1 June 2023, first time offenders were merely advised to clean up after themselves. Since 1 June 2023, first-time offenders will be issued an immediate written warning, second-time offenders will face a composition fine of SGD$300 and subsequent offenders may face court fines under Singapore's Environmental Public Health Act.

In 2024, a stall at Marine Parade Cental reportedly received the highest bid of S$10,680 but was withdrawn. The second highest bid of S$10,158 was successful. NEA did not confirm the bid was the highest successful bid.

==== Socially-conscious enterprise hawker centres ====
In 2015, the NEA started appointing socially-conscious operators to manage socially-conscious enterprise hawker centres (SEHC) but are commonly called social enterprise hawker centres. SEHC operators need to have a social mission with social objectives for the community. In 2018, Senior Minister of State for Environment and Water Resources Amy Khor had to clarify the terms during Parliament. As of 2018, there were five operators managing seven SEHC out of 114 hawker centres.

==== Urban Hawker ====
On September 21, 2022, Urban Hawker, a Singaporean-style hawker centre opened in Manhattan, New York City. The idea was suggested in 2013 by American chef Anthony Bourdain after visiting Singapore, and he collaborated with Singaporean chef KF Seetoh, who completed it after Bourdain's death in 2018. The market consists of traditional Singaporean dishes, with most of the vendors hailing from Singapore.

==== Criticism ====
Tan Kim Fong, a dietitian at the National University Hospital, wrote that many hawker dishes, such as fried rice, thosai, and mee goreng, contained more carbohydrates and less proteins, prioritising taste and satiety, making people not meet their required protein intake.

=== Indonesia ===
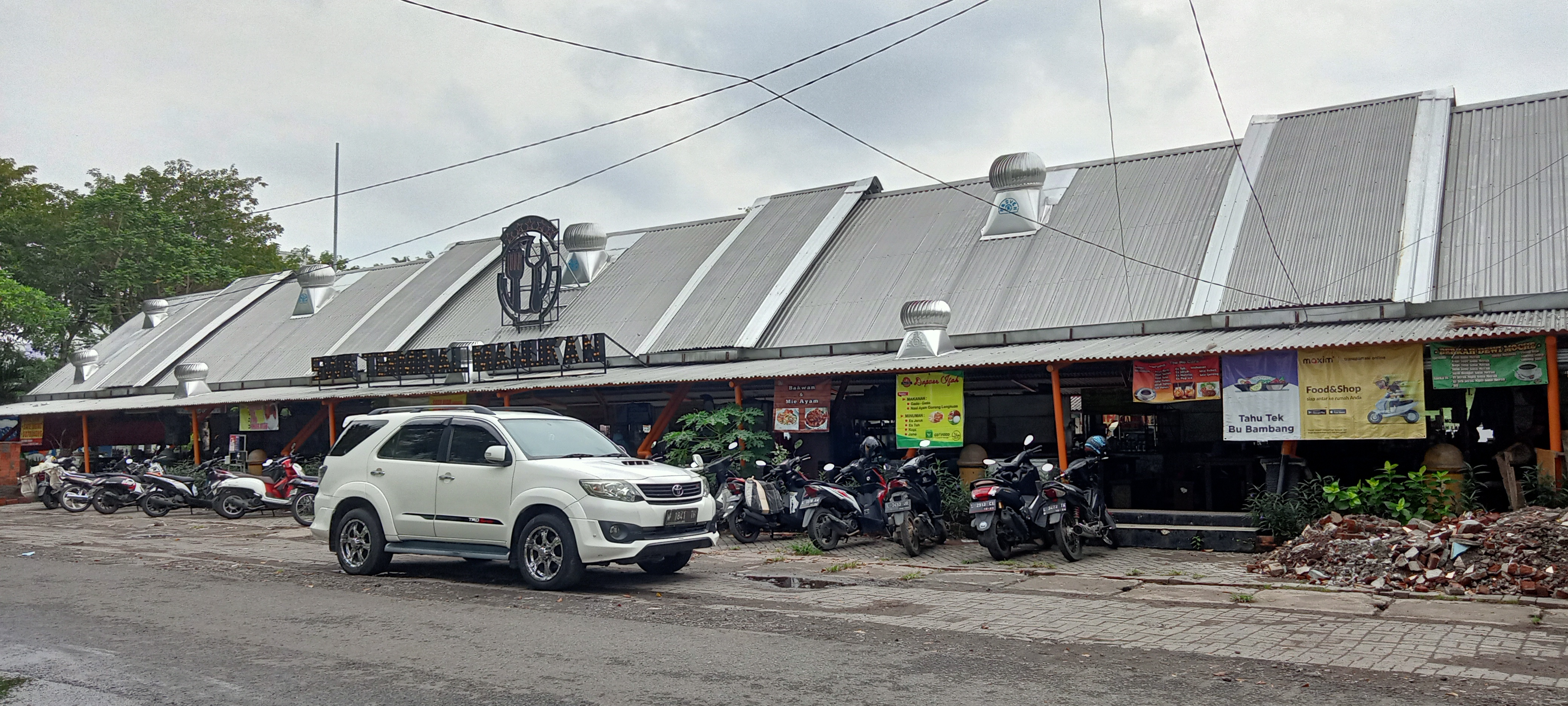
Sentra Wisata Kuliner in Terminal Manukan, Surabaya, East Java

In Surabaya, various hawker centres called Sentra Wisata Kuliner (abbreviated as SWK; lit. 'Culinary Tourism Centers') were established. Sentra Wisata Kuliner are areas that provide various food dishes consisting of several small stalls or stands from culinary street vendors. The government of Surabaya has made culinary street vendors (pedagang kaki lima) a tourist destination so that their image may change for good.

== See also ==
- Cha chaan teng, Hong Kong diner
- Dhaba, Indian roadside diner
- Diner, American roadside dining
- Hawker (trade)
- Kopi tiam, Malayan coffee shop
- Pasar malam, Malayan night market
- Food court, western style
- Greasy spoon, in the US and Britain
- Mamak stall, Malayan road stall
- Truck stop, in North America
- Night market
