= Tetsuya Wakuda =

Japanese-born Australian chef

Tetsuya Wakuda OAM
- 和久田 哲也
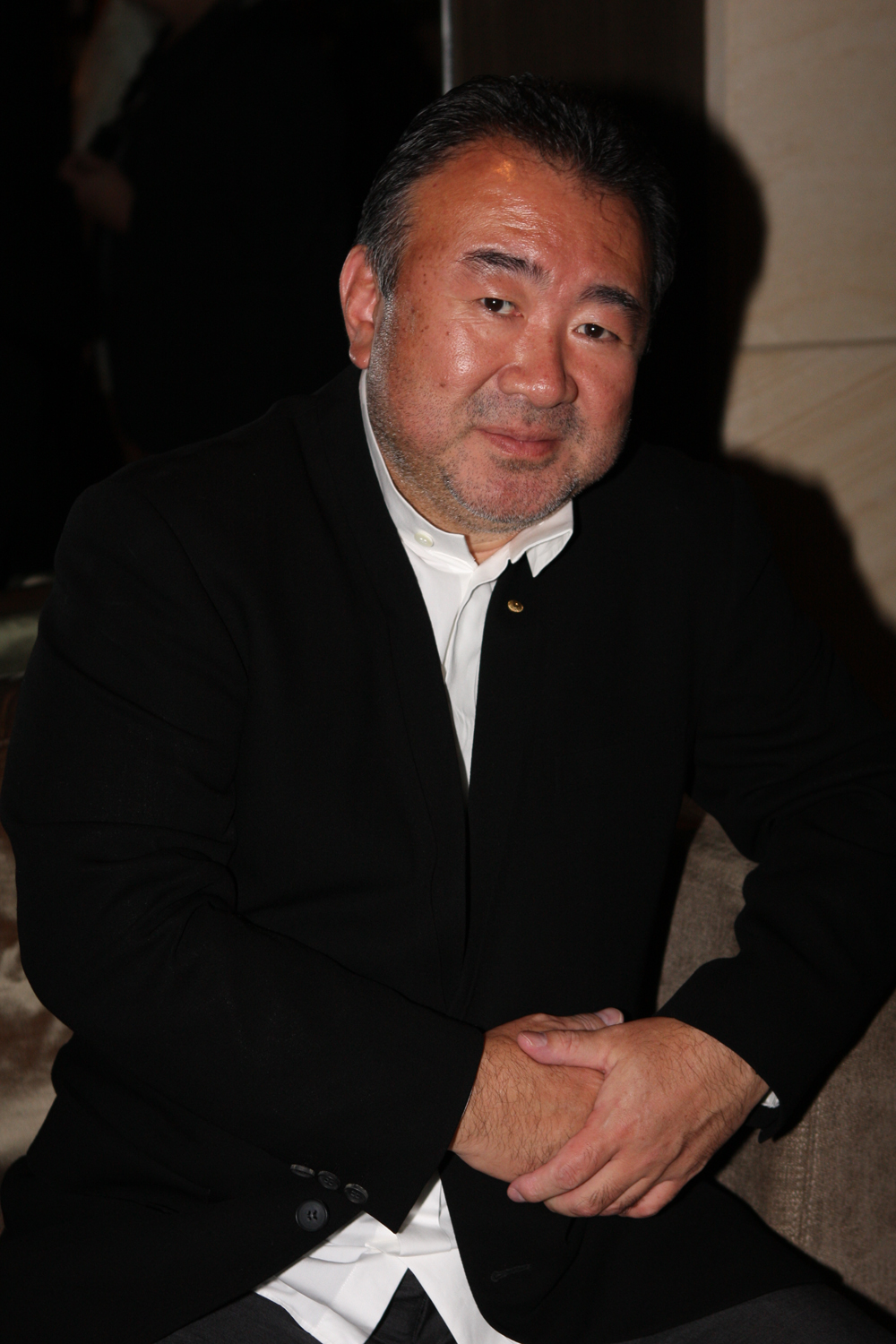
- Wakuda in 2012
- Born: 18 June 1959 (age 67); Hamamatsu, Shizuoka, Japan
- Occupation: Chef
- Culinary career
- Rating
- (Michelin Guide)
- Current restaurants
- Waku Ghin; Wakuda

Tetsuya Wakuda (和久田 哲也, Wakuda Tetsuya) OAM (born 18 June 1959) is a Japanese-born Australian chef based in Sydney. He was the leading judge in the final episode of the second season of Junior MasterChef Australia.

== Early life ==
Tetsuya Wakuda was born on June 18, 1959, in the city of Hamamatsu in Shizuoka Prefecture, Japan.

== Culinary career ==
In 1983, Wakuda met Sydney chef Tony Bilson, who hired him to prepare sushi at Kinsela's in Taylor Square. Under Bilson, Wakuda learned classical French techniques that underpin his Japanese-French fusion cooking. Wakuda says that Kinsela's was where he realised he wanted to cook, and discovered that he could.

Wakuda left Kinsela's in 1983 and set up Rose's nightclub with one of the restaurant's managers. He worked as a chef there for a year. After leaving, he was introduced to chef Hans Mohr and worked as a second chef with him for six months.

=== Tetsuya ===
Wakuda decided to start his own restaurant with his wife and opened Tetsuya in 1989, in Sydney's inner-west suburb of Rozelle. In 1992, The Sydney Morning Herald Good Food Guide awarded the restaurant Three Hats.

The restaurant was remodelled in 1993, increasing seats to 65, with an expanded and re-fitted kitchen. In November 2000, Tetsuya's moved to a larger location in Sydney's CBD.

Tetsuya's Confit of Ocean Trout has been described as the "most photographed dish in the world". Charlie Trotter said: "Tetsuya is part of an elite group of international chefs, that has influenced other chefs through their personal styles and unique approaches to food. His culinary philosophy centers on pure, clean flavours that are decisive, yet completely refined. His amazing technique, Asian heritage, sincere humility, worldwide travels and insatiable curiosity combine to create incredible, soulful dishes that exude passion in every bite."

Tetsuya was awarded the Medal of the Order of Australia (OAM) in the 2005 Queen's Birthday Honours "For service to the community and the development of Australian cuisine as a chef, restaurateur and author, to vocational training and to support for charitable groups."

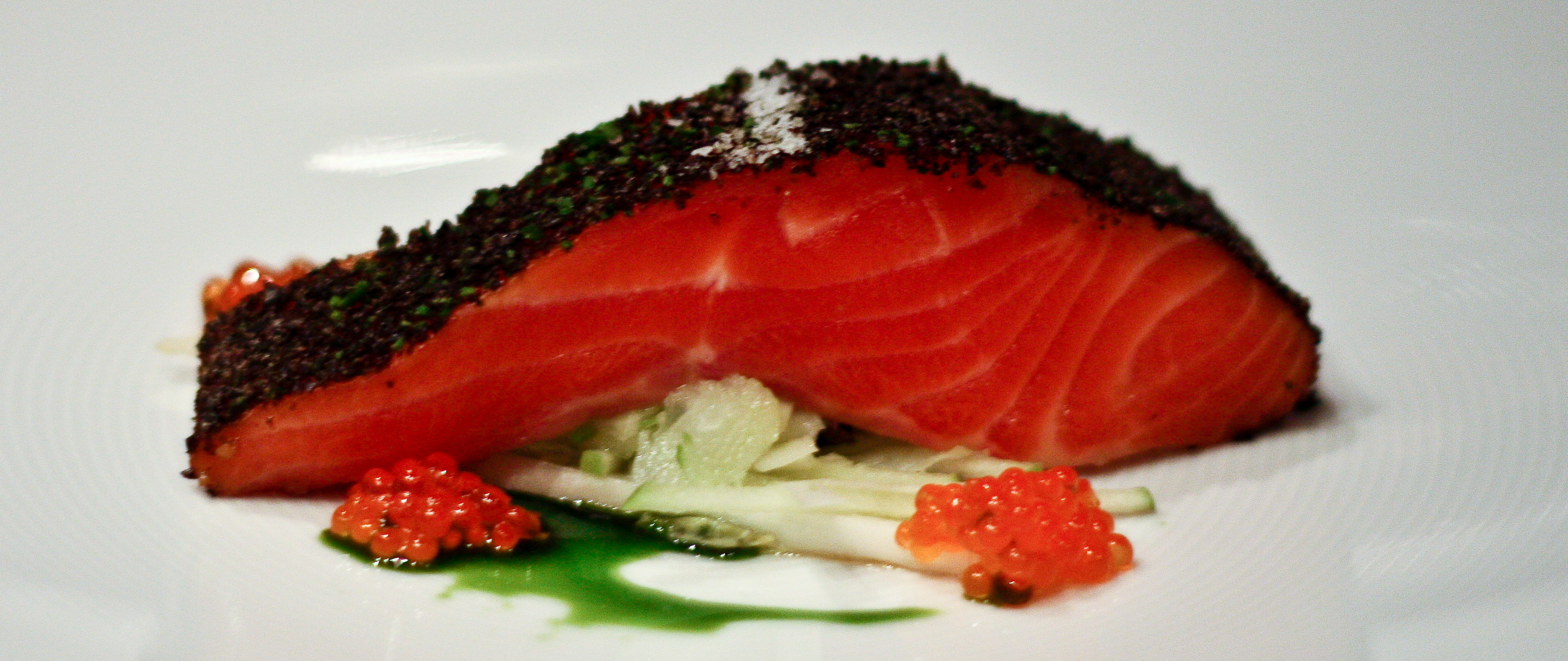
Tetsuya's signature dish Confit of Ocean Trout

Tetsuya's went on to win many more awards, including the Australian Good Food Guide (AGFG) 4 Chef Hats in 2021.

=== Waku Ghin ===
In 2010, Tetsuya's second restaurant, Waku Ghin, opened in Singapore at Marina Bay Sands with an offering of a 10-course tasting menu. In 2015, it was listed as #70 on The World's 50 Best Restaurants. It was subsequently awarded one Michelin star in the inaugural 2016 Singapore edition of the Michelin Guide and then two Michelin stars in 2017. It maintained its two star rating until 2024, where it was awarded just one Michelin star.

The dining experience, Japanese with European influence, centers on an intimate 10-seat Chef's Table offering multi-course omakase menus that showcase seasonal ingredients sourced from Japan, including seafood and wagyu beef. The signature dishes at Waku Ghin includes Marinated Botan Shrimp with Sea Urchin and Caviar and Grilled Carabinero Shrimp.

=== Wakuda ===
In 2022, Tetsuya opened a restaurant at The Venetian Las Vegas hotel in the Palazzo tower on the Las Vegas Strip.

The following year, Tetsuya launched Wakuda Singapore at Marina Bay Sands, in partnership with 50 Eggs Hospitality Group. The restaurant offers a menu combining Japanese flavors with global influences and is located within the hotel’s lobby area.
