= Crystal Jade =

Singapore-based culinary brand

Crystal Jade Culinary Concept Holdings

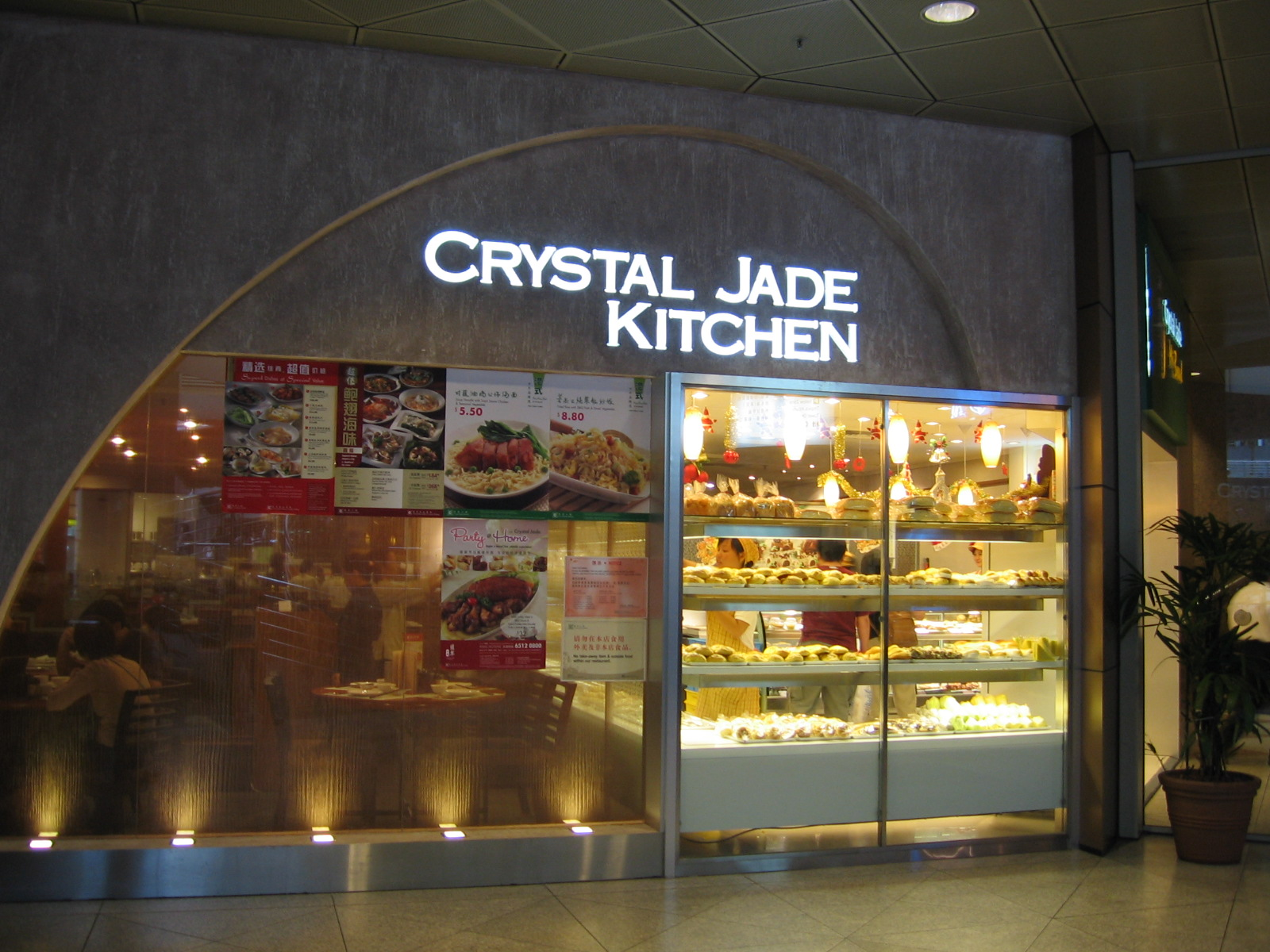
- Crystal Jade Hong Kong Kitchen at Suntec City Mall
- Trade name: Crystal Jade
- Type: Private
- Industry: Food and beverage
- Founded: 1991; 35 years ago
- Headquarters: Singapore
- Number of locations: 9 (2026)
- Area served: Singapore
- Number of employees: 4,500 (2015)
- Parent: L Catterton Asia (90%)
- Website: Official website

Crystal Jade Culinary Concepts Holding (Chinese: 翡翠餐饮集团) is a Singapore-based Chinese restaurant culinary brand with one Michelin star and multiple Michelin Bib Gourmand awards. It is currently owned by L Catterton Asia, the private equity arm of LVMH, since 2014.

== History ==
The first Crystal Jade restaurant opened in 1991 at Cairnhill Hotel, Singapore. In 1992, Ip Yiu Tung invested HK$10 million (1992) (US$1.29 million) to keep the restaurant afloat and set the strategic directions of the company.

In 2014, L Catterton Asia, the private equity arm of LVMH, bought about 90% shares of Crystal Jade. Later in June 2015, Standard Chartered Private Equity announced a US$52,000,000 (equivalent to $70,630,352.38 in 2025) investment into the company.

As of 2015, Crystal Jade has 120 restaurants globally with 47 located within Singapore, and employs 4,500 full-time staff.

By 2026, only 9 outlets in Singapore remained operational.

== List of awards ==
- One Michelin Star in Singapore Michelin Guide (2016 - 2018)
- Bib Gourmand in Shanghai Michelin Guide (2017) and Hong Kong & Macau Michelin Guide (2005 - 2016)
- Recommended Chinese Restaurant in Seoul & Shanghai Michelin Guide (2017- 2018)
