= Hill Street Tai Hwa Pork Noodle =

Street food stall in Singapore

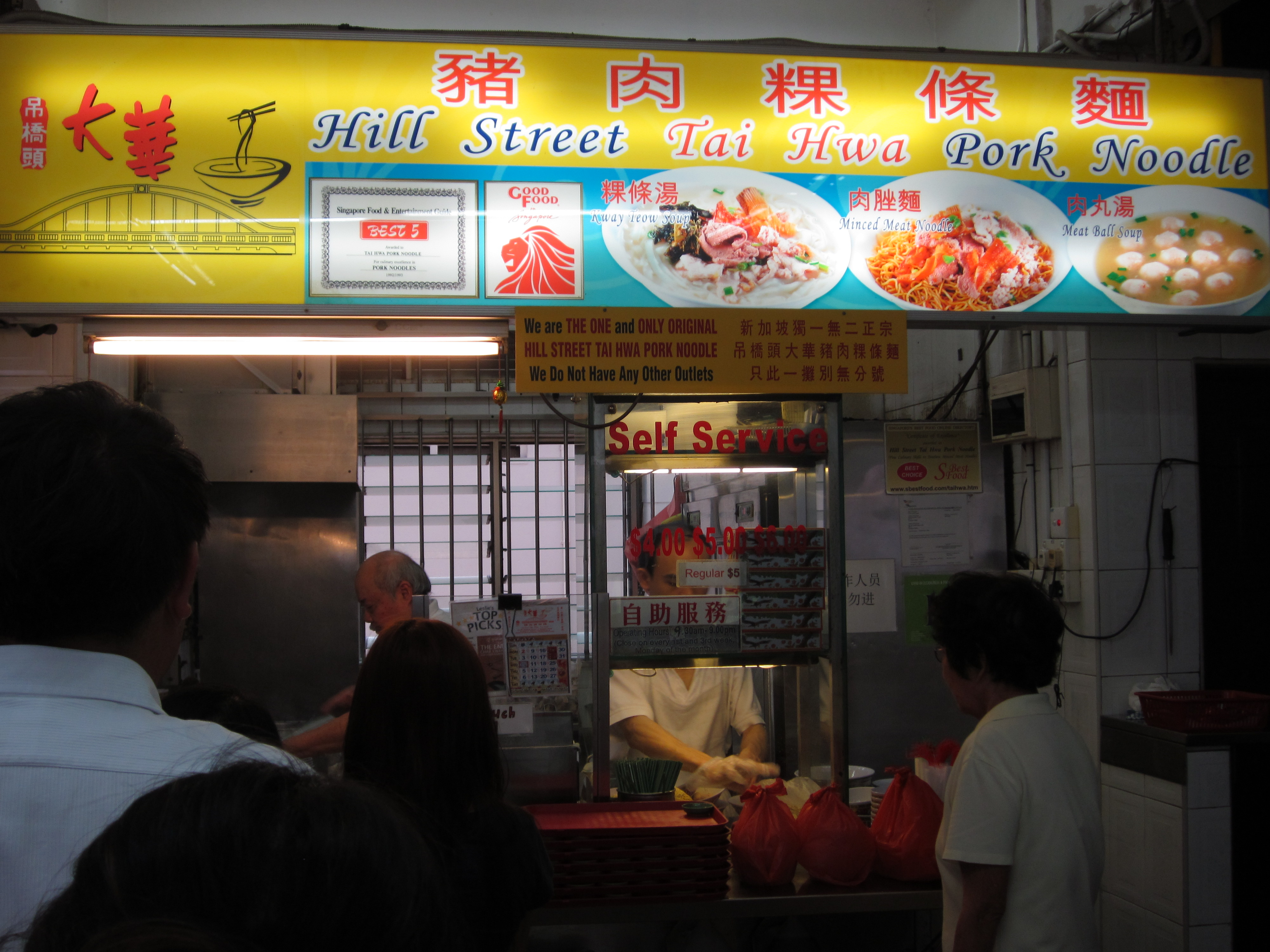
- Interactive map of Hill Street Tai Hwa Pork Noodle

Restaurant information
- Head chef: Tang Chay Seng
- Food type: Street food
- Rating: (Michelin Guide 2025)
- Location: 466 Crawford Lane, #01-12, Tai Hwa Eating House, Kallang Planning Area, 190465, Singapore
- Coordinates: 1.30528°N 103.86241°E

Hill Street Tai Hwa Pork Noodle
- Simplified Chinese: 大华猪肉粿条面
- Traditional Chinese: 大華豬肉粿條麵
Transcriptions
Standard Mandarin
- Hanyu Pinyin: Dà Huá Zhūròu Guǒ Tiáo Miàn

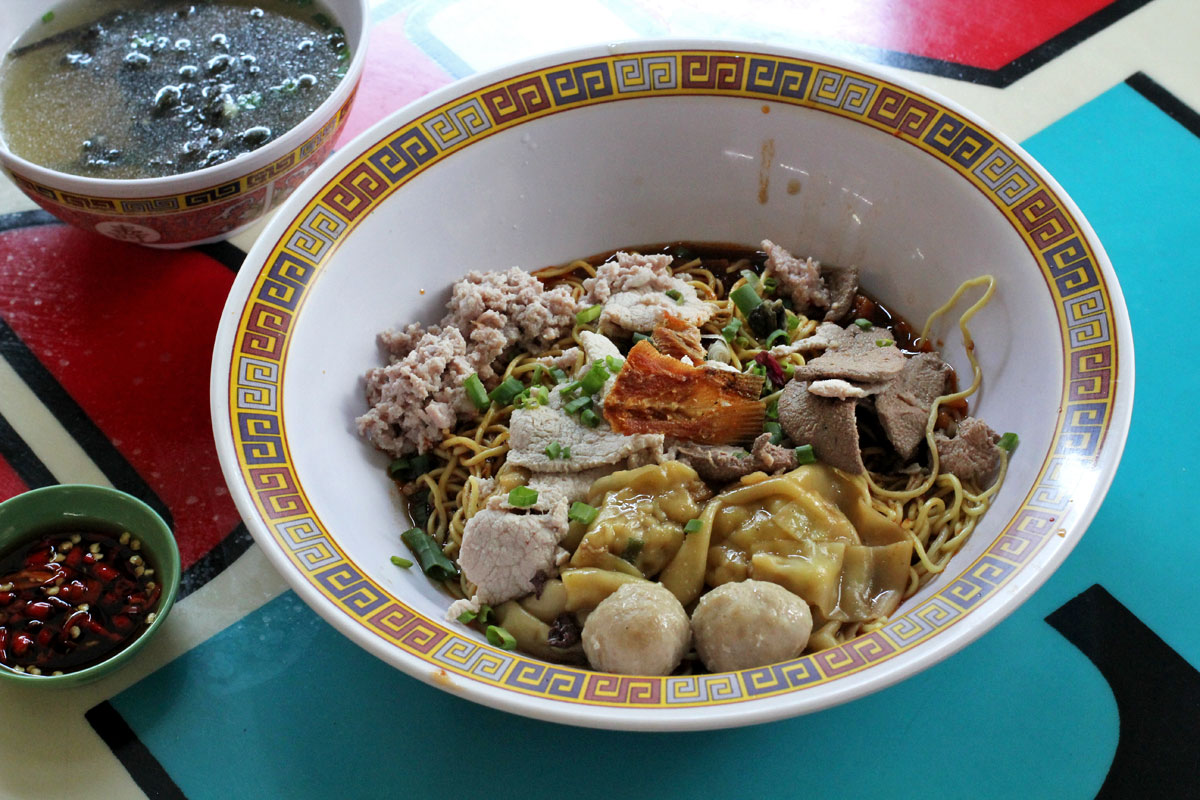
Bak chor mee at Hill Street Tai Hwa Pork Noodle

Hill Street Tai Hwa Pork Noodle (Chinese: 大华猪肉粿条面) is a street food stall in Kallang, Singapore. It is owned and run by Tang Chay Seng. In 2016, it became one of the first two street food locations in the world to be awarded a star in the Michelin Guide, a distinction it has so far held every year since.

== Description ==
Hill Street Tai Hwa Pork Noodle is a street food stall, one of 6,000 such stalls within Singapore. It was founded in the 1930s by Tang Joon Teo, but after he fell ill during the 1960s, his second son Chay Seng took over its management. When Tang Joon Teo died in 1995, he left the stall to his three sons. Tang Chay Seng continues to run the stall, which was originally located at Hill Street, it moved in the 1990s to Marina Square and again in 2004 to Crawford Lane.

The stall serves bak chor mee (minced meat noodles), with the noodle component tossed through black vinegar, chilli paste and other ingredients, a recipe created by Tang Joon Teo. There are other affiliated stalls within Singapore, with his brother Tang Chai Chye formerly running High Street Tai Wah. His two sons now run two separate stalls under that brand name. Tang Chay Seng's nephew, Arthur Tung Yang Wee, runs the Lau Dai Hua stall within Terminal 2 of Singapore Changi Airport. These stalls resulted in a legal claim in 2008 by Tang Chay Seng when Arthur Tung Yang Wee ran an advertisement saying that his stall had moved from the original location of Hill Street. This resulted in a loss of business for Tang Chay Seng, as some customers believed that it was his stall which had moved. Tang Chay Seng lost the case, but was awarded a sum as a goodwill gesture.

== Reception ==
Hill Street Tai Hwa Pork Noodle became one of the first two street food stalls in the world to be awarded a Michelin Star, alongside Hong Kong Soya Sauce Chicken Rice and Noodle, gaining the recognition in the 2016 list for Singapore; this was the first time that Singapore had a Michelin Guide created for it. The award has resulted in the usual queue increasing from around 30 minutes to up to two hours.
