= MasterChef Colombia =

- Genre: Cookery
- Created by: Franc Roddam
- Presented by: Claudia Bahamón
- Judges: Paco Roncero; Jorge Rausch; Nicolás de Zubiría
- Country of origin: Colombia
- Original language: Spanish
- No. of seasons: 2

Production
- Running time: 60 minutes
- Production company: Shine International

Original release
- Network: RCN Televisión
- Release: January 14, 2015 – present

MasterChef Colombia is a Colombian competitive cooking reality show that broadcast by RCN Televisión since January 14, 2015. It is based on the original British television show MasterChef.

== Judges ==
Judge	Profession
Paco Roncero	He is one of the maximum representatives of the Spanish culinary avant-garde. A technical and creative avant-garde that translates not only into a kitchen style but also in the way of offering and understanding gastronomy as a unique sensory experience. He is currently executive chef and director of the Casino de Madrid and its restaurant La Terraza del Casino; of the Estado Puro gastrobars in Madrid, Ibiza and Shanghai; from the Barbarossa by Paco Roncero restaurant, also in Shanghai; of Original Version by Paco Roncero in Bogotá; from the Synergies gastronomic multispace at Platea Madrid and from Sublimotion, the most advanced and innovative restaurant ever imagined that is located in the Hard Rock Hotel in Ibiza, the first hotel of the famous chain in Europe. His cuisine is the result of his masterful mastery of the most evolved culinary techniques, of his overflowing creativity and innate sensitivity, and of his capacity for innovation and research spirit; a style that has resulted in important contributions to the global culinary avant-garde. Thus, in the Terrace of the Casino, he holds 2 Michelín Stars and 3 Soles Repsol, a recognition of both to his cuisine and the special care that he puts as director in all the details involved in the gastronomic ritual.
Jorge Rausch	He is a renowned Colombian chef with Polish roots, owner of the Criterión restaurant. He is also main chef, owner and partner of Bistronomy by Rausch, Rausch Energía Gastronómica, Marea by Rausch, El Gobernador by Rausch, Kitchen by Rausch', Local by Rausch and Ivory Bistró by Rausch, the latter of them in Costa Rica.
Nicolás de Zubiría	Despite his youth, he is a chef and partner in the Magnolio, NN and Kong restaurants, which have a very good reputation in Colombian gastronomy. His career as a cook began when he decided to study in Vancouver, city which helped him a lot to explore flavors and try new dishes from different cultures, since that place has inhabitants from all over the world who, with their eating habits, made the proposal gastronomic was more varied.

== Season 1 (2015) ==
=== Contestants ===
Contestant	Age	Occupation	Hometown	Final position
Federico Martínez	26	Economics Student	Barranquilla	Winner
Paulo Jo Chung	40	Restaurant Cashier	Palmira	Runner-Up
María Luisa Arias	24	Graphic Designer	Medellín	Semifinalist
Luis "Lucho" Funes	31	Business Administrator	Medellín	18th Evicted
Claudia X. Rodríguez	39	Political Scientist	Ipiales	17th Evicted
José Fernando Montoya	29	Painter	Bogotá	16th Evicted
Juan David Guevara	19	Student	Bogotá	15th Evicted
Esteban Cardozo	31	Publicist and Architect	Bogotá	14th Evicted
Wilmar Sánchez	37	Lawyer	Ocaña	13th Evicted
Evelyn Posada	26	Model	Santa Marta	12th Evicted
Valeria Ortega	19	Telemarketer	Barranquilla	11th Evicted; 7th Evicted
Diorlín Andrade	29	Route Monitor	Quibdó	10th Evicted; 5th Evicted
Melanie Amaya	22	Merchant	Cúcuta	9th Evicted; 8th Evicted
Samai Burbano	23	Domestic Employee	Patía	6th Evicted
Betty Tobón	58	Pensioner	Medellín	4th Evicted
Ubeymar Hernández	33	Broadcaster	Medellín	3rd Evicted
Jorge Luis Carrero	27	Bartender	Barranquilla	2nd Evicted
Juan Castañeda	37	Industrial Designer	Bogotá	1st Evicted

== Season 2 (2016) ==
=== Contestants ===
Contestant	Age	Occupation	Hometown	Final position
Leonardo Morán	33	Designer and Model	Cúcuta	Winner
Ana Belén Charry	25	Anthropologist	Bogotá	Runner-Ups
Natalia Restrepo	38	Teacher	Turbo	Runner-Ups
Liliana Cano	45	Lawyer	Bogotá	Semifinalist
Alfredo Clavijo	31	Master Painter	Bogotá	16th Evicted
Alexandra Castrillón	49	Teacher	Riohacha	15th Evicted
Luigi Barreto	18	Administration Student	Barranquilla	14th Evicted
Andrés Germán	25	Biochemistry Student	Bogotá	13th Evicted
María Alejandra Babilonia	27	Teller	Cartagena	12th Evicted
Brayner Campillo	35	Marketer	Itagüí	11th Evicted
Cielo Moreno	43	School Principal	Cali	10th Evicted
Jhon Jairo Tangarife	32	Businessman	Envigado	9th Evicted
Christian Arenas	41	Systems' Engineer	Bucaramanga	8th Evicted
Paola Palacios	36	Food Engineer	Cali	7th Evicted
Ingrid Gómez	39	Writer and Lecturer	Cúcuta	6th Evicted
Luis Jaimes	27	Taxi Driver	Barranquilla	5th Evicted
Karla Ñungo	37	Psychologist	Cali	4th Evicted
Daniel Ávila	45	Businessman	Bogotá	3rd Evicted
Irma Echeverri	58	Housewife	Rionegro	2nd Evicted
Javier Rodríguez	29	Actor	Cali	1st Evicted

== See also ==
- MasterChef
