= Art Nouveau in Madrid =

Spanish branch of artistic style called Art Nouveau

Art Nouveau in Madrid (Spanish: Modernismo madrileño) is the historiographic term given to the artistic style Art Nouveau as it developed in and around Madrid, the capital of Spain, around 1900, permeating architecture, design, the decorative arts, graphic arts, and broader culture. There is also a "Modernismo madrileño" in the field of literature, likewise situated in the capital and considered to be the nucleus of the origins of the modern movement of Spanish literature.

Forming part of a general current that arose throughout Europe–and simultaneously known as Art Nouveau (Francophone countries), Jugendstil (German-speaking countries and Scandinavia), Modernisme (Catalunya), Stile Liberty or Stile floreale (Italy), Sezession (Austria), Szecesszió (Hungary), Nieuwe Kunst (the Netherlands), among many other terms–Modernismo in Madrid evolved in distinct stages of intensity depending on the branch of the arts in question. While in architecture it was used largely superficially in an ornamental and occasionally structural capacity, in literature and the decorative arts, including stained glass and ceramics, it developed according to those disciplines’ own creative focus, each with a different personality.

== Architecture ==
=== Main characteristics ===
Madrid's Art Nouveau architecture is often described as eclectic, not only because it conforms to the eclectic currents that dominate the city's urban planning at that time, but also because of the confluence of French, Belgian, Italian, Viennese and Catalan models. Such models reach in Madrid a primarily ornamental materialization, limited to facades and interiors, and hardly have a translation in structural terms, in such a way that, in most cases, the buildings are projected based on traditional patterns, but with modernist finishes.

Despite this, constructions of great architectural significance were erected, such as the Palacio de Longoria, which Pedro Navascués describes as a major landmark for the entire development of European Art Nouveau; the Casa de Enrique Pérez Villaamil, which follows the lines of the Belgian architect Victor Horta; The Eastern Necropolis, one of the most outstanding contributions to the history of Spanish Art Nouveau and one of the best cemeteries of its time; or, in the field of sculpture, the Guirao Pantheon, a masterpiece of funerary art.

Art Nouveau in Madrid is also characterized by less decorative profusion than in other locations, a feature that certain authors link to the architectural sobriety of the city, inherited from the Habsburg dynasty, without forgetting the classicist influence of the Royal Academy of Fine Arts of San Fernando or the solid roots of architectural eclecticism.

Although there were numerous Art Nouveau buildings constructed in Madrid, many of them have since disappeared and its historiography has been overshadowed by the strength and importance of Catalan Art Nouveau (Modernisme). Currently, some two hundred buildings of this style remain in the capital, including palaces, community houses, neighborhoods (garden cities), industrial and commercial buildings, bridges, hydraulic infrastructures, religious temples and funerary sites.

=== Evolution ===
According to Óscar da Rocha Aranda and Ricardo Muñoz Fajardo, Madrid's Art Nouveau architecture develops through three well-differentiated stages, which cover the last years of the nineteenth century and the first two decades of the twentieth. The first of them, which can be dated from 1896 to 1904, signifies the timid introduction and subsequent clarification of the style, within an architectural environment in which eclecticism prevails. The peak period lasted from 1905 and 1914, after which a declining stage extended between 1915 and 1923.

==== First stage (1896–1904) ====
The first manifestations of Art Nouveau in the capital arose in 1883 within the pictorial arts, with the isolated precedent of the paintings in the Assembly Hall of the Ateneo de Madrid (Madrid Athenaeum). But it was not until the end of the nineteenth century when the movement came to its full form, when the headquarters of the magazine Blanco y Negro was erected in 1896, one of the first buildings in the city to incorporate Art Nouveau ornamentation, and which, according to Da Rocha and Muñoz, marks the beginning of Madrid's Art Nouveau, although still confined to the field of decorative arts. It was followed in 1899 by the building located at number 22 Calle del Barquillo, whose hall is also decorated with Art Nouveau motifs.

In the following years, Art Nouveau currents penetrated architecture in an increasingly forceful way, with projects inspired both by secessionism and by French and Belgian models (rarely by Catalan Modernisme), which entered the capital as a result of the 1900 Exposition Universelle in Paris. In the opinion of Pedro Navascués, this event was decisive for the development of Madrid's modernist architecture, not only because it exerted a direct influence, but also because Madrid was designated as the venue for the VI International Congress de Arquitectos, which took place in 1904, with Art Nouveau as the main theme.

One of the major practitioners of Art Nouveau in Madrid was the architect Antonio Farrés Aymerich, who employed the style starting in 1901, albeit superficially, with three residential buildings located on Calle Valenzuela (the so-called Casa de Tomás Salvany), Calle Alcalá (at its intersection with Calle de Pedro Muñoz Seca) and the confluence of the Calle Sagasta and Calle Francisco de Rojas. Also in 1901, another pioneering building was designed by an unknown architect at 3, Avenida de la Albufera, which stands out for the exuberant stone decorations of its balustrade and central viewpoint.

In 1902, three important Art Nouveau buildings were erected, which, unlike the previous ones, incorporate the style more boldly, in a compositional, spatial and structural sense; that is, not merely decorative: the Pantheon of José de la Chamber, by Benito González del Valle; the House of the Marquise of Villamejor, by Manuel Medrano Huetos; and the Palacio de Longoria, by José Grases Riera. To these we should add the demolished hotel-studio that Félix de la Torre y Eguía, built between 1902 and 1905 on the Calle Velázquez, where traditional influences are combined with Art Nouveau features.

Da Rocha and Muñoz argue that this stage came to an end in 1904. The simultaneous inauguration of the Palacio de Longoria, undoubtedly the most important creation of this period, and the aforementioned International Congress of Architects, one of three events in 1904 that, as discussed below, are also key to the propagation of the movement.

Building	Architect	Built	Description	Image
Panteón de José de la Cámara (Madrid)	Benito González del Valle (arquitecto)	1902	Madrid funerary architecture assimilated Art Nouveau principles very early on. In the tombs of Paula Bravo (1901), the Esteban de la Peña family (1901) and José Mario Echarri (1902), all of them located in the Sacramental of San Justo, there is an embryonic Art Nouveau aesthetic, which is fully visible in the tomb of José de la Cámara (1902), also belonging to the aforementioned cemetery. The expressive force of this last work lies in its forceful volumetry, achieved by means of a simple structure that is covered with two waters and in the treatment it carries out of the stone materials. In addition to the secessionist inspiration, there is a French influence in the use of arches and the design of the grillwork.	
Casa de la marquesa de Villamejor (Madrid)	Manuel Medrano Huetos (architect)	1902–1904	Located on Calle del Maestro Victoria, this old residential building, promoted by the Marquise of Villamejor, has almost no modernist features, due to the radical reforms carried out for its conversion into a hotel, which have led to the practice disappearance of one of the key works of Madrid's early modernism. The original plans show a symmetrical composition, with an axial axis that articulates the entire complex and from which different binding elements emerge that surround the facade. Only a few bars and the main doorway, carved with plant forms, remain from the original project.	
Palacio de Longoria (Madrid)	José Grases Riera (arquitecto)	1902–1904	Located on Calle de Fernando VI, this palace was built at the initiative of José González Longoria, with a purpose not only residential (upper floor), but also commercial, as the headquarters of his banking business (lower floor). It is one of the great works of European modernism, a label that Pedro Navascués justifies in Graseas' ability to adapt modernist language to urban palatial architecture; in his expressive freedom when designing the elevations and profiles of the facades; in the intimate treatment that the rear façades receive, conceived as a transition towards the garden, with its curious columns-palm tree; and in the use of iron for both decorative and structural purposes. The interior imperial staircase deserves a special mention, influenced by French models, which presents an effective bifid development from a mixture of marble, bronze, iron and glass.	
Casa de Ruiz de Velasco (Madrid)	José López Sallaberry (architect) Francisco Andrés Octavio (architect)	1904–1906	Francisco Andrés Octavio drew up the first project, based on conventional patterns, which José López Sallaberry later transformed. The latter conceived a decidedly modern façade, which, however, inherits from the initial design his taste for balance and symmetry. The naturalistic motifs of the decoration stand out, based on flowers and intertwined stems, together with the undulating forms that are outlined on the openings, the balustrades, the cornices, the pinnacles, the columns or the factory viewpoints. The building, located on Calle Mayor, takes its name from its promoters, the textile businessmen Bonifacio and Pablo Ruiz de Velasco, who reserve the ground floor for their store.	

==== Second stage (1905–14) ====
The second stage began in 1905, a year after three key events that contributed to the spread of the movement throughout the city in Madrid took place:

- The VI International Congress of Architects (VI Congreso Internacional de Arquitectos), which brings prestigious architects from all over the world to the capital, to debate, in an almost monographic way, about the scope and convenience of modernist language. It was held at the Ateneo de Madrid and among the attendees are the Belgian Franz de Vestel, the German Hermann Muthesius, the Austrian Hermann Helmer, the Italian Filippo Vivanet and the Dutchmen Pierre Cuypers and Hendrik Petrus Berlage, as well as the Spaniards and Catalans Josep Puig i Cadafalch, Ricardo Velázquez Bosco, José Urioste, Enrique María Repullés and Lluís Domènech i Montaner.
- The National Exhibition of Fine Arts (Exposición Nacional de Bellas Artes), which, in its 1904 edition, brings together a significant number of Art Nouveau works from all artistic disciplines, which are made known in Madrid.
- The international competition for the construction of the Casino de Madrid, to which about thirty projects by national and foreign authors were submitted, including several that used Art Nouveau. The competition was cancelled after the submission of several projects, and it was then decided to merge the best ideas of each one of the designs, with an eclectic solution ultimately executed by José López Sallaberry, distinguished by its monumental staircase that reveals the unmistakable imprint of Art Nouveau.

Although it is not possible to quantify precisely the impact of the three events mentioned, starting in 1905 a series of clearly Art Nouveau buildings were constructed in Madrid. Unlike the developments with Modernisme in Barcelona, where the bourgeoisie and upper classes were the primary patrons, in Madrid Art Nouveau responded to initiatives from different social groups, from the aristocracy (case of the building that the Marquis of Morella erected on the Calle Montalbán or those promoted by the Duchess of Fernán Núñez in Cava de San Miguel) to liberal professionals (Enrique Pérez Villaamil's house on the Plaza Matute), as well as the bourgeoisie itself, the mercantile societies (headquarters of the weekly newspaper Nuevo Mundo and Compañía Colonial) or the lower classes (as at 4 Calle de don Pedro).

According to Pedro Navascués, the existence of patrons of a very diverse nature explains the heterogeneity of the projects that were launched, with cultured forms that coexist with popular solutions. Expressions of Catalan Modernisme proliferate, though initially in a very limited manner, while purely Madrid-based creative sources also emerged. The first group corresponds to the aforementioned Casa de Pérez Villaamil, by Eduardo Reynals Toledo, which reveals a very deep knowledge of the work of Horta, and the latter is illustrated by the Necropolis del Este, where Francisco García Nava defined a genuinely new architectural language.

One of the fields where the style found a better reception was provisional or ephemeral architecture, which, based on experimental materials, covered specific and temporary needs. This domain included a large number of the film sets of the early twentieth century, conceived as striking Art Nouveau pavilions that attempted to attract the attention of potential clients; and the constructions for the Madrid Industries Exhibition, held in 1907 in the Retiro Park, including the Central Palace and the Palace of the Circle of Fine Arts, by Luis Bellido González and Ricardo Magdalena Gallifa, respectively.

The strength that Art Nouveau achieved from 1905 onwards is demonstrated in the projects of an architect with a high academic profile such as Enrique María Repullés y Vargas, who designed a hotel-studio for Mariano Benlliure (1908), which in the end was not carried out. However, Antonio Palacios Ramilo also worked in the style, designing a residential building at 3, Calle del Marqués de Villamejor (1906–07); he also contributed designs for the Madrid Metro, in which a clear Viennese Sezession influence can be seen, as in the canopies of the disappeared pavilions of the Puerta del Sol and the Red de San Luis or the railings that are still preserved on some entrances.

Outside the capital, Art Nouveau spread rapidly to neighboring towns, many now annexed to Madrid, responding to urban developments that sought to relieve congestion in the center. In the old municipalities of Canillas and Chamartín de la Rosa, Arturo Soria constructed the Ciudad Lineal, where Art Nouveau traces can be seen in some chalets (such as Villa Rosario and Casita Blanca, still standing) and, above all, in different venues of the now-developed Parque de Diversiones (1906), such as the Teatro Escuela, the bar or the restaurant.

In Carabanchel Felipe Mario López Blanco built the Colonia de la Prensa, with a clear set of Art Nouveau details, while the Catalan architect Josep Puig i Cadafalch built the tower of the lords of Bofarull, a palace popularly known as Bofarull Castle, demolished after damage suffered during the Civil War (1936–39). In this old municipality, now incorporated into Madrid proper, the Military Radiographic Station (1911) was also built.

In Sierra de Guadarrama, different samples of Art Nouveau architecture are preserved, mainly vacation villas constructed at the initiative of the upper class. Although those in San Lorenzo de El Escorial (such as Villa Manolita, El Capricho or Villa Las Torres) are clustered together geographically, there are also interesting examples of residences and other types of properties in Cercedilla, El Escorial, Guadarrama, Las Matas, Los Molinos, Lozoya, Miraflores de la Sierra, Pozuelo de Alarcón and Torrelodones.

In other areas of the autonomous community, Art Nouveau has a purely decorative impact, as can be seen in the sgraffito and sculptural details of certain houses in Arganda del Rey, Chinchón, Colmenar de Oreja, Estremera, La Acebeda, Moraleja de Enmedio or Pinto, although it is also linked to industrial architecture. This is the case of the now-defunct Portland cement factory in Aranjuez, the Grau and Saéz distilleries in Chinchón, or the Santa Lucía hydroelectric plant in Torrelaguna, attributed to Antonio Palacios.

In 1908, construction activity in Madrid largely ceased during a moment of economic crisis, which slowed the development of Art Nouveau architecture. Around 1911 there was a resurgence, although without the vitality of the previous works and with a drift, in many cases, towards the so-called "modern French style," which supposes a tempering of Art Nouveau.

In the words of Pedro Navascués, this current can be defined as "a refined and bourgeois eclecticism," which lowered the initial avant-garde impetus by means of more balanced and academic solutions. Although in some cases these remain faithful to Art Nouveau examples (such as the Casa Gallardo), in others these are reduced to simple decorative details (the Metrópolis Building, the Ritz Hotel, the Palace Hotel, and the Military Casino, for example).

In addition to this drift, the movement was also weakened by the so-called regionalism, a nationalist radicalization of eclecticism, which promotes the substitution of any foreign model for styles considered autochthonous. Around 1914, the exhaustion of Art Nouveau in Madrid architecture became palpable, which, however, did not prevent it from developing a third and final stage of an epigonal nature.

==== Third stage (1915–23) ====
In the midst of World War I and long after its decline in most other European centers (though, notably, not in Barcelona), Art Nouveau in Madrid lost much of its popularity and faded into other architectural trends, such as regionalism and the emerging Art Deco. In this last period, which extended from 1915 to approximately 1923, several notable buildings were erected, which, although they lack the creative force of the two previous periods, still maintain some Art Nouveau influences.

According to Da Rocha and Muñoz, at this time both the number and quality of Art Nouveau buildings declined. Despite this, some very notable structures were erected, such as the Reina Victoria Hotel, which anticipates the commercial building model of Antonio Palacios, or the National Temple of Santa Teresa de Jesús and the convent of the Discalced Carmelite Fathers, both by Jesús Carrasco-Muñoz. Added to these are the former Casa-taller de Patricio Romero, by Luis Ferrero Tomás, located at 33, Calle del General Palanca, and the now-demolished bandstand on Paseo del Pintor Rosales by Luis Bellido González.

The Teatro Salón Cervantes, the Teatro Centro Obrero and the Teatro Cine Variedades also belong to this late strand of Art Nouveau. These are located outside the capital, in Alcalá de Henares, Navalcarnero and San Lorenzo de El Escorial, respectively. While the first two are currently in operation, after having been rehabilitated and conditioned, the third has been closed since 2007, as it is in a delicate state of preservation.

Building	Architect	Date	Description	Image
Hotel Reina Victoria	Jesús Carrasco-Muñoz Encina (architect)	1916–23	Conceived originally as a shopping center designed for Almacenes Simeón, this building marks a milestone in the history of Madrid architecture because regenerating the old eclecticism through a peculiar Art Nouveau formula, which, at the same time, remains related to the creations of the architect Antonio Palacios. The conjunction between tradition and modernity is also evident in the exterior ornamentation, with a curious combination of secessionist elements and historicists. The hotel is located in plaza de santa Ana, on the corner of plaza del Ángel.	
Templo Nacional de santa Teresa de Jesús y convento de los Padres Carmelitas Descalzos	Jesús Carrasco-Muñoz Encina (architect)	1916–28	Although the first stone was laid in 1916, on a site near the Plaza de España, the works did not begin until 1923, finishing in 1928. Jesús Carrasco-Muñoz approaches modernism from formulas medievalists, with which he intends to reference the work The interior castle (also called Las moradas), by Santa Teresa de Jesús, to whom the ensemble is dedicated. The church has a Latin cross plan with three naves (the two on the sides with tribunes) and a flat roof supported by lowered semicircular arches. Its grandiose dome stands out, covered with ceramic mosaics by Daniel Zuloaga, in the absence of the great 90-meter tower, which, due to financial problems, was never built. It is decorated with stained glass like the Casa Maumejean.	
Antigua Casa-taller de Patricio Romero (Madrid)	Luis Ferrero Tomás (architect)	1922–25	Located on the Calle del General Palanca, this building is a unique example of Catalan Modernisme, which finds no precedents either in the Madrid urban landscape or in the previous career of Luis Ferrero Tomás, an architect traditionally attached to eclecticism. Initially conceived for industrial use, in the end several floors of houses were built, reserving only the ground floor for a workshop. The author is inspired by the mosaics of broken tiles popularized by Antoni Gaudí to carry out what Da Rocha and Muñoz classify as the best example of trencadís that exists in Madrid. The rejerías, as asymmetrical baskets, and the false arches of the openings, configured by approximation of courses, are other elements that denote the Catalan influence of the complex.	
Quiosco de música del paseo del pintor Rosales	Luis Bellido González (architect)	1923	Based on a neo-rococo approach, which reflects the modernist currents of the time, Luis Bellido González conceives a large roof supported by sixteen fine iron columns, paired into eight groups. Its inauguration takes place on May 15, 1923, with a concert of Spanish popular music, offered by the Municipal Symphony Band of Madrid and the Choral Association, under the direction of Ricardo Villa. The kiosk was located on an artificial esplanade, at the confluence of Paseo del Pintor Rosales with Calle del Marqués de Urquijo, next to Parque del Oeste, where it remained until 1951, when it was demolished.	
Teatro Salón Cervantes (Alcalá de Henares)	José María Aguilar (first architect) Architect of the Art Nouveau sections is unknown	1888 (construction) 1924 (Art Nouveau renovations)	This small theater was built in 1888 on the site that had been occupied by the Capuchin Convent, in the old Tahona street (today Cervantes street), commissioned by the County Owners Society of Alcalá de Henares. The Art Nouveau features that the building presents do not come from the original project of José María Aguilar, but were incorporated during the remodeling of 1924, when the style lived its last phase, of an epigonal character. The result of this reform is the current façade, made up of three bodies with a curvilinear finish, and the interior decoration, which is also ascribed to modernism. In 1989, 1997 and 2004, new interventions took place, aimed at adapting it as one of the rooms of the Community of Madrid Theater Network, of which it is a part.	
