= Ultraviolet (restaurant) =

Single-table restaurant in Shanghai, China

Coordinates: 31.238°N 121.489°E

- Interactive map of Ultraviolet

Restaurant information
- Established: 2012
- Closed: 2025
- Owners: Paul Pairet and VOL Group
- Food type: avant-garde
- Dress code: No dress code
- Rating: (Michelin Guide)
- Location: Shanghai, China
- Seating capacity: 10
- Reservations: Essential
- Website: https://uvbypp.cc/

Ultraviolet by Paul Pairet was a single-table restaurant in Shanghai, China, opened in May 2012 by French chef Paul Pairet and the VOL Group. In October 2014, Ultraviolet became one of the restaurant members of Les Grandes Tables du Monde, the first restaurant in this organization from China. In September 2017, the second edition of Michelin Guide Shanghai released the results for 2018, and Ultraviolet received 3 Michelin stars.

In November 2024, it was reported that Ultraviolet would be suspending operations indefinitely, citing disruptions from a surrounding construction site. The restaurant's website noted that it would be "closing its doors to the public" on 29 March 2025. As of May 2025, reservations are no longer available.

== Overview ==
Billed as the first multi-sensory restaurant in the world, Ultraviolet uses sight, sound and smell to enhance the food through a controlled and tailored atmosphere. The restaurant has a single table of 10 seats and serves a single 20+ course dinner menu for ten guests each night. The dining room of Ultraviolet is ascetic with no décor, artifacts, paintings, or views. The room is equipped with multi-sensory technology such as dry scent projectors, stage and UV lighting, 360-degree wall projection, table projectors, beam speakers and a multichannel speaker system. Each course of the menu is accompanied by lights, sounds, music, and/or scents to provide context for the dish's taste.

Ultraviolet originally evolved from Pairet’s desire to reduce the technical constraints of the traditional restaurant, which is organized to provide “a la carte” service. This type of organization requires preparation methods that Pairet considers “sub-standard”. By monitoring the timing of the courses and offering a fixed menu, Ultraviolet attempts to optimize the control and quality of cooking in ways that the majority of traditional restaurants cannot – a model that has roots in the historical “table d’hôte” concept. This control allows Ultraviolet to direct the atmosphere for each dish through multi-sensory technology.

Ultraviolet incorporates technology traditionally used in unrelated fields to drive and control Pairet's concept of 'psycho taste', which The New York Times writer Howie Kahn described as "a gateway to the mind," “[delving] into the notion that memories, associations, expectations, ideas, misunderstandings, joys and fears all play a role in the experience of a meal.”

In November 2024, it was reported that Ultraviolet would be suspending operations indefinitely, citing disruptions from a surrounding construction site. The announcement came amid a broader decline in luxury spending in China linked to the country’s prolonged property crisis. Pairet would remain in Shanghai and focus on launching a new food truck project. As of May 2025, the restaurant's website noted that it would be "closing its doors to the public" on 29 March 2025 and that reservations wouldn't be available beyond this date.

== Cuisine ==
The restaurant's cuisine draws on Pairet’s French background, his experience working in Paris, Hong Kong, Sydney, Jakarta and Istanbul, with emphasis on experimentation, comfort and simplicity. The restaurant has described its cuisine as “avant-garde figurative.” After developing this concept since 1996, Pairet publicly presented the final theory of Ultraviolet for the first time in 2010 at the OFF5 French Omnivore Food Festival in Deauville, France.

== Reception ==
=== Overview ===
Howie Kahn commented in The New York Times, "Ultraviolet, and its auteur, seem like the next steps in the chain of culinary evolution". He described the food and dining experience as "succeed[ing] brilliantly, mesmerizingly and, as intended, deliciously."

Brian Johnston of the Sydney Morning Herald described Ultraviolet as "probably the most avant-garde restaurant in the world." The Telegraph reviewed the restaurant in 2017, characterizing it as "the world's most innovative restaurant" and "a culinary experience beyond compare".

Condé Nast Traveller UK edition selected Ultraviolet in its Gold Standard Restaurants 2013, saying “Ultraviolet is China's most immersive foodie experience… Truly extraordinary.”

Ultraviolet has received three Michelin stars since the second edition of Michelin Guide Shanghai released in September 2017, after its two stars in the first edition.

It was noted as being one of world's greatest places in 2018 by Time.

=== William Reed Business Media ===
Ultraviolet was ranked the 8th best restaurant in William Reed Business Media's Asia's 50 Best Restaurants list in both 2013 and 2014, the 60th world's best restaurants in 2013 (when Paul Pairet's other restaurant Mr & Mrs Bund was ranked the 43rd), and the 58th in 2014 in The World's 50 Best Restaurants 51-100 list.

Between 2015 and 2019, the restaurant consistently ranked among the top establishments in Asia and the world. In 2015, it was ranked No. 3 in Asia's 50 Best Restaurants and No. 24 in The World's 50 Best Restaurants. The following year, it placed No. 7 in Asia and No. 42 globally. In 2017, it ranked No. 8 in Asia and No. 41 in the world. In 2018, it retained its No. 8 spot in Asia, received the Art of Hospitality Award, and returned to No. 24 in the global ranking. In 2019, it climbed to No. 6 in Asia and ranked No. 48 in the world.

=== Sublimotion controversy ===
Paul Pairet criticized Paco Roncero's restaurant, Sublimotion, which opened in 2014, for suspected copying of his restaurant concept, especially objecting to Sublimotion being marketed as "the first gastronomic show in the world".

== See also ==
- List of Michelin 3-star restaurants
- List of restaurants in China
