= Banco Hispano Americano =

Bank based in Madrid, Spain

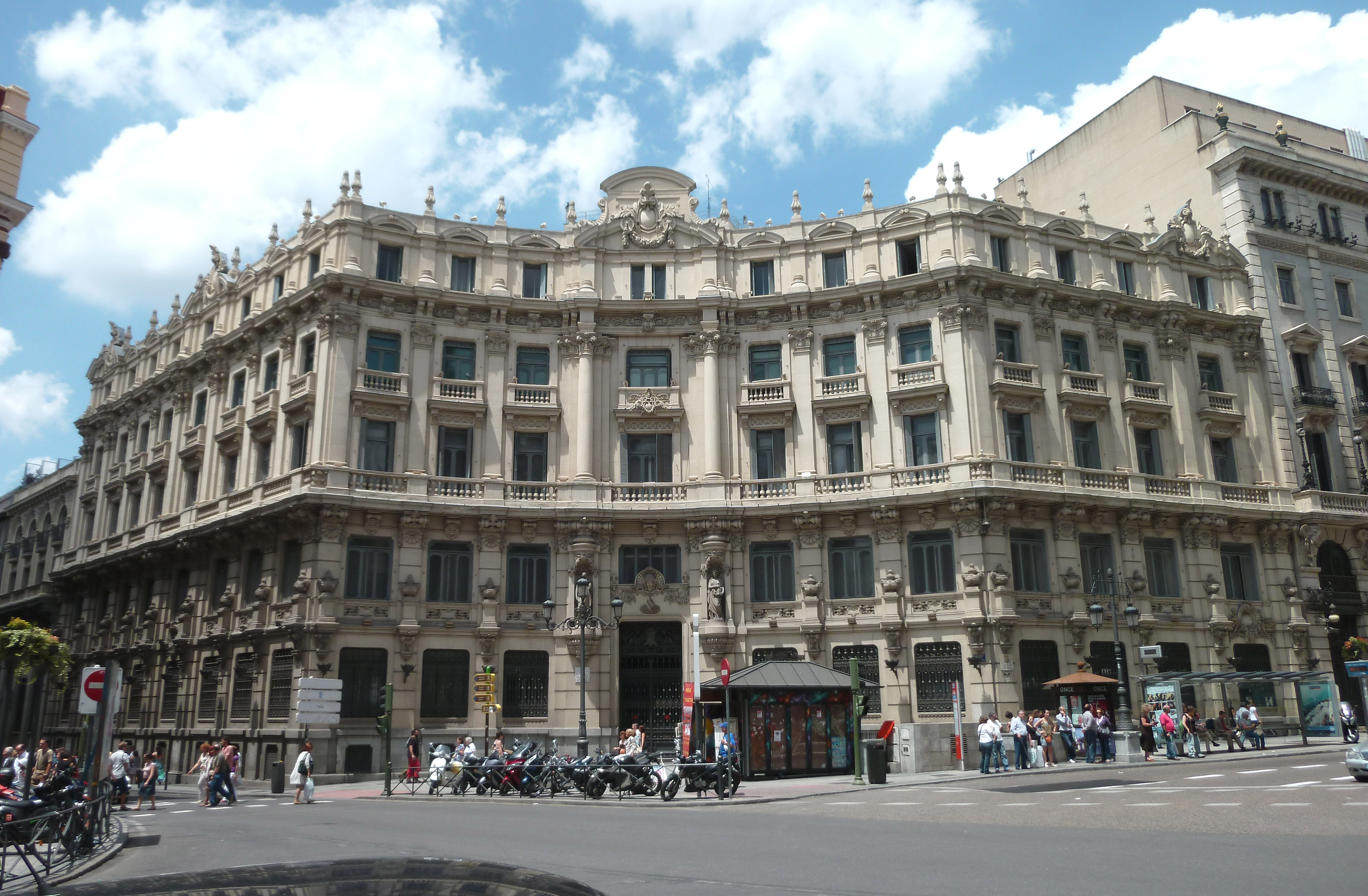
- Headquarters of Banco Hispano Americano in Plaza de Canalejas, Madrid.
- Type: Limited liability company
- Industry: Financial services
- Founded: 1900
- Defunct: 1991
- Fate: Dissolution through merger with the Central Bank
- Successor: Banco Central Hispano
- Headquarters: 40°25′01″N 3°42′02″W, Madrid, Spain
- Products: Banking services
- Total assets: 30,958 million pesetas (1991)
- Number of employees: 14,399 (1991)

Banco Hispano Americano (BHA) was a private Spanish bank that operated during most of the 20th century, becoming one of the most important financial institutions in the country. The activities of the Hispano Americano were not limited to the financial sector and it also had a prominent presence in the industrial sector through various investments. It was also linked to foreign trade, operating in numerous countries.

In 1991, Hispano Americano agreed to a merger with Banco Central, which resulted in the creation of Banco Central Hispano (BCH).

== History ==
=== Beginnings and development ===
It was created by a group of investors brought together by Antonio Basagoiti Arteta, a businessman from Biscay who had made his fortune in Mexico in the textile, leather, agricultural, and railroad sectors. The Zaldo and Ibáñez families were among the group, who had also prospered in the United States. On October 25, 1900, the investment conclave resulted in the foundation of a financial institution with a national vocation. Until then, only the Banco de España had branches throughout Spain, and the founders of the BHA wanted to create a private banking infrastructure with a peninsular scope.

At the end of 1913, BHA suffered a crisis of confidence due to the bank's rumored commercial presence in Mexico, then plagued by political instability. The crisis was resolved with the intervention of the Bank of Spain, which acted for the first time as a lender of last resort. Unlike other institutions, the process consolidated a conservative management policy that prevented excessive involvement during the First World War. As of 1929 and following the appointment of Andrés Moreno García as general manager, management was decentralized.

=== Investments in the industrial sector ===
Throughout its existence, the entity made important investments in the Spanish industrial sector. It was closely associated with the creation in 1928 of the Compañía Arrendataria del Monopolio de Petróleos (CAMPSA), or the company Hidroeléctrica de Cataluña in 1946. In the mid-1950s, the bank played a leading role in the negotiations that led to the acquisition of the Rio Tinto mines from the British Rio Tinto Company Limited and was also part of the consortium that eventually formed the Compañía Española de Minas de Río Tinto to exploit the deposits. Linked to the Sociedad Española de Construcciones Electromecánicas (SECEM), in 1978 the bank provided financial support for the operation that led to the creation of the holding company Ibercobre.

In 1976 the details were finalized for the takeovers of Banco Mercantil e Industrial and Banco de Gijón. In December 1976, a representative office was opened in Tehran, the first to be opened by a Spanish bank, with the aim of channeling commercial activities between Iran and Spain. That same year Banco Hispano Americano and Banco Urquijo created a company aimed at promoting and managing Spanish commercial and industrial operations in Iran, as well as attracting resources from that country. Among the companies participating in the company were Duro Felguera, Entrecanales, and CAF. The expansive strategy followed by the company made it the second-largest Spanish bank in 1977.

The opening of an office in Tehran was not the only case of international expansion, as BHA established offices in cities such as Rio de Janeiro, São Paulo, London, Lisbon, and Moscow.

In 1984, the Ministry of Economy and Finance awarded Banco del Norte due to the re-privatization of the Rumasa Group banks.

=== Crisis and clean-up ===
As a consequence of the Jarillas Pact, signed in 1944 between the Marquises of Aledo and Urquijo, the industrial banking operations were left in the hands of Banco Urquijo. The industrial crisis of the late 1970s and early 1980s severely affected the banks' industrial portfolios. In 1984 the bad situation was such that the then president of BHA, Claudio Boada, was forced not to distribute dividends. The Bank of Spain supervised a long reorganization process and provided Ptas. 45,000 million in aid, which was partly provided by the rest of the large banks and the Deposit Guarantee Fund. These resources were returned when Hispano sold Banco Urquijo Unión to the March Group in November 1988. For this sale, Hispano obtained 67,500 million pesetas.

=== Merger with Central ===
The merger in 1991 with Banco Central was the culmination of a merger process whose first attempt dated back to the sixties. The first project was carried out by Ignacio Villalonga and Antonio Basagoiti in the mid-sixties. When the operation was practically closed, the Minister of Finance, Juan José Espinosa San Martín, and his undersecretary, Luis Valero Bermejo, thought that the new bank would acquire too much power and denied the requested tax benefits. The merger became so expensive that Villalonga abandoned the idea. With Luis de Usera at the helm of BHA and Alfonso Escámez of BC, a new attempt was made, which also failed. The proposed share exchange did not satisfy Usera after evaluating the balance sheets. The third attempt was made in 1989, with Claudio Boada as president, but the outcome of the negotiations did not allow any agreement to be reached.

An agreement was finally reached in 1991. Talks between the presidents of the institutions led to the drafting of a document of intentions, signed on May 14 and approved the same day by the boards of directors of both banks. The document listed twelve points by which the merger was to materialize. These included the complementarity between the banks, the share exchange whereby BHA shareholders would receive five BC shares for every six BHA shares, and the composition of the board of directors of the new entity.

On October 30, 1991, the shareholders of BC and BHA banks voted on the bank merger. Due to the conditions under which the process was carried out, the merger was really an absorption of BHA by BC. On November 1, the Bank of Spain issued a favorable report on the operation. Likewise, the Directorate General of Taxes sent all the documentation presented to formalize the operation to the Government's Delegate Commission for Economic Affairs, which was responsible for giving the final approval before it was approved by the Council of Ministers. On January 1, 1992, the capital increase of the Central Bank, amounting to 34,069 million pesetas, planned for the formal absorption of Hispano, was officially registered with the CNMV (National Securities Market Commission). On December 30 of the previous year, after the last signing of the merger, Hispano had ceased to be listed on the Stock Exchange, giving way to the new shares of Banco Central Hispanoamericano which, once its capital had been increased, began to contract normally.

== Management ==
	Chairman	Period
I	Antonio Basagoiti Arteta	1901-1933
II	Luis Ibáñez Posada	1934
III	Ignacio Herrero de Collantes	1935-1961
IV	Antonio Basagoiti Ruiz	1961-1968
V	Luis de Usera	1968-1983
VI	Alejandro Albert	1983-1985
VII	Claudio Boada Villalonga	1985-1990
VIII	José María Amusátegui	1990-1991

== See also ==
- List of banks in Spain

== Bibliography ==
- Arenas Posadas, Carlos (2017). «Riotinto, el declive de un mito minero (1954-2003)». Revista de Historia Industrial (Barcelona: Universidad de Barcelona) (69): 109–142.
- Escudero Prado, María Eugenia; Pateiro Rodríguez, Carlos; Rodríguez Seijo, Javier (2002). Análisis sectorial del mercado de valores. Netbiblo
- Pascual Domenech, Pere (2008). «La industria del cobre en España II: de 1976 a 2005». Revista de Historia Industrial (Barcelona: Universidad de Barcelona) (38): 115-159
