= Sublimotion =

Restaurant in Ibiza, Spain

Coordinates: 42°15′00″N 3°13′35″E

SubliMotion
- Interactive map of SubliMotion

Restaurant information
- Established: Late 2014
- Owner: Eduardo Gonzáles
- Head chef: Paco Roncero
- Location: Sant Josep de sa Talaia, Ibiza, Spain
- Website: www.sublimotionibiza.com

SubliMotion is a restaurant located in Sant Josep de sa Talaia, Ibiza, Spain run by chef Paco Roncero who utilizes molecular gastronomy in cooking. The restaurant is known for being among the most expensive in the world. As of 2015, the restaurant overtook Urasawa and Per Se to be considered the most expensive with an average price of slightly over €1900 (US$2,000) per person.

== Restaurant ==
The restaurant opened in 2014 at Ibiza's Hard Rock Hotel and focuses on haute cuisine. The food course consists of 20 food tasting entrees and can seat a maximum of 12 patrons. In 2014, Sublimotion was awarded the prize Best Innovation Food & Beverage.

== Controversy ==
SubliMotion was criticized by Paul Pairet for suspected copying of his restaurant Ultraviolet with similar conception, opened in 2012, especially objecting to Sublimotion being marketed as "the first gastronomic show in the world".
