= Escámez =

Escámez is a Spanish surname. Notable people with the surname include:

- Alfonso Escámez, 1st Marquess of Águilas (1916–2010), Spanish banker
- Julio Escámez (1925–2015), Chilean painter
