= Águilas =

- Municipality
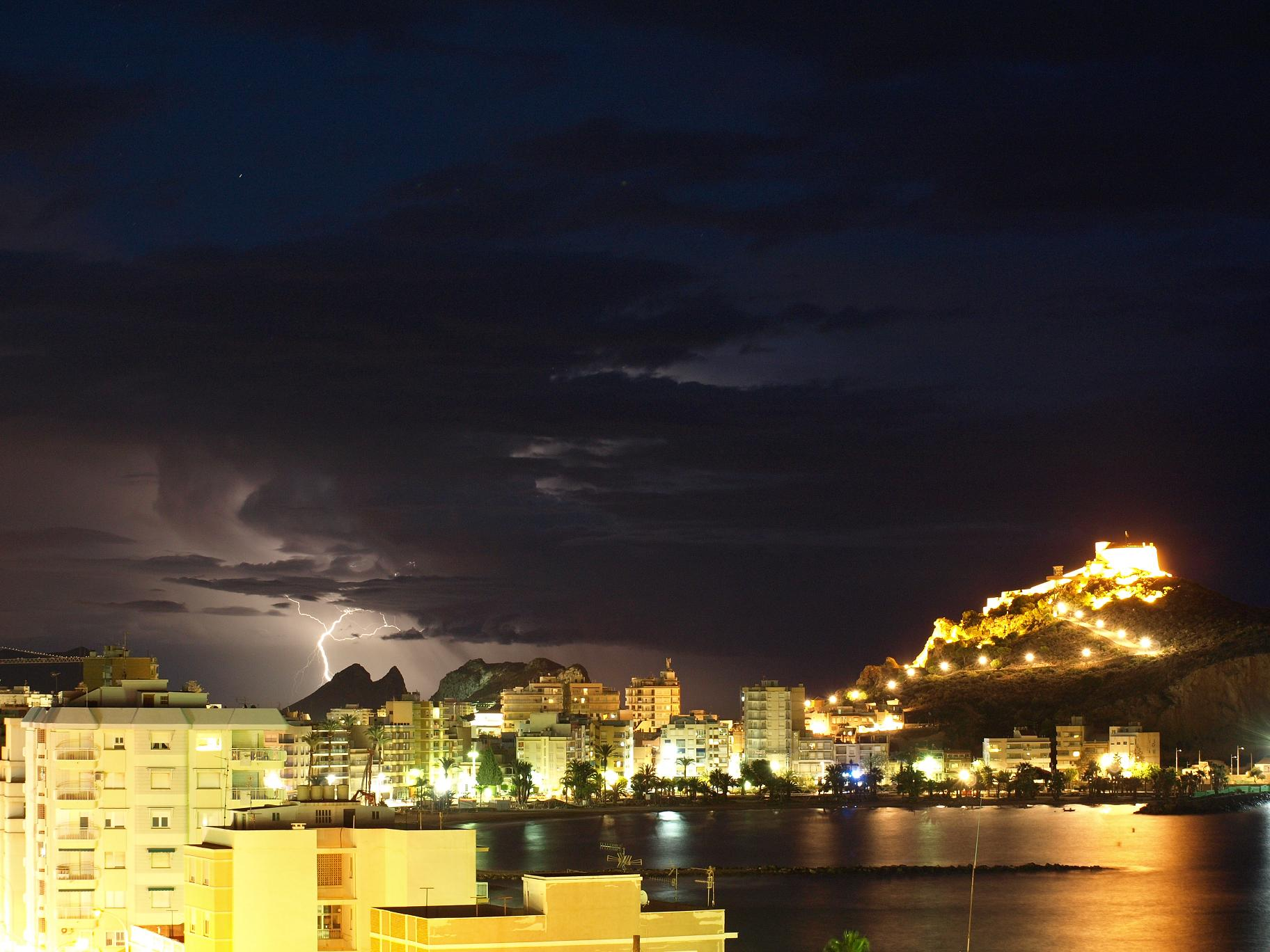
- A thunderstorm over Águilas

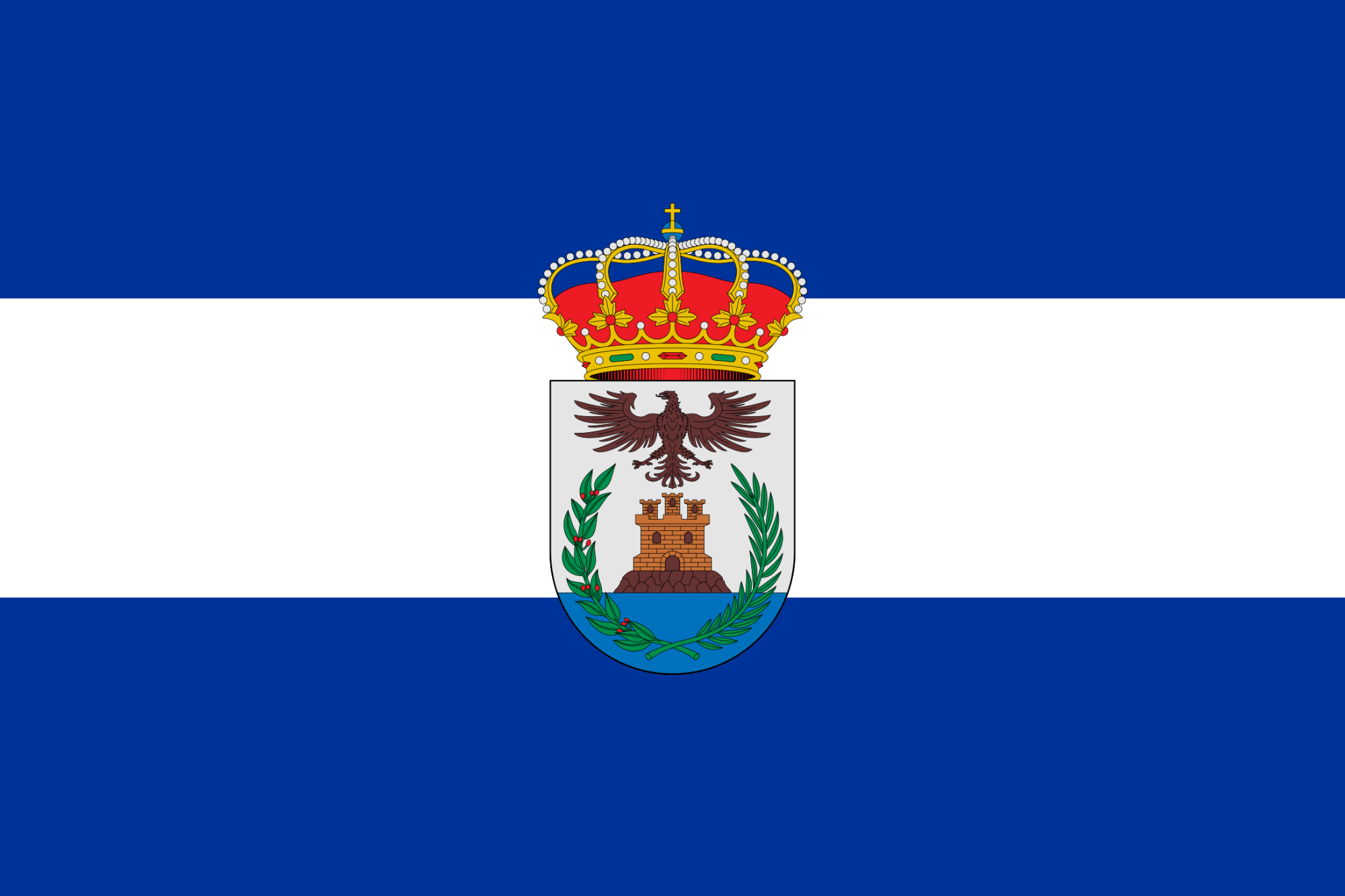
- Flag Coat of arms

- Location in Murcia Location in Spain
- Country: Spain
- Autonomous community: Murcia
- Province: Murcia
- Comarca: Alto Guadalentín

Government
  - Mayor: Cristóbal Casado (PSOE)

Area
  - Total: 251.77 km^{2} (97.21 sq mi)

Population (2025-01-01)
  - Total: 37,811
  - Density: 150.18/km^{2} (388.97/sq mi)
- Postal code: 30880
- Area codes: 968 and 868
- Website: ayuntamientodeaguilas.es

Águilas (Spanish: [ˈaɣilas]) is a municipality and seaport of southeastern Spain, in the province of Murcia. It is situated at the southern end of Murcia's Mediterranean coastline, otherwise known as the Costa Cálida, near the border with the Province of Almería.

== Location and geography ==
The municipality has a population of 36,403 people (INE 2022), and an area of approximately 253.7 square kilometres (97.95 sq mi), with some 28 kilometres (17 mi) of coastline. It is 105 kilometres (65 mi) southwest of the provincial capital, Murcia.

Águilas is built on the landward side of a small peninsula, between two bays—the Puerto Poniente on the southwest, and the Puerto Levante on the northeast. The Puerto de Aguilas, close to the centre of the city, is flanked on its western side by a large rocky hill. On its top sits the Castillo de San Juan de las Águilas castle, built in the 18th century on the site of a much older Carthaginian fortification. King Charles I ordered its refurbishment in 1530 to help protect the coast from Turkish and Algerian incursions. The rock cut from the south side of the castle's hill, and which left it with an almost vertical wall up to the castle on that side, was used to expand Aguilas' port in the early 20th century. The city sits at the end of the Murcia-to-Aguilas Renfe train service.

Águilas has numerous beaches along a 25-kilometre (16 mi) stretch, including Cala de la Cueva de las Palomas, Cala de la Herradura, Playa Amarilla, Playa de Calabardina, Playa de Calacerrada or Playa de Los Cocedores, Playa de Cope, Playa de la Cañada del Negro, Playa de la Casica Verde, Playa de la Cola, Playa de la Colonia, Playa de la Galera, Playa de la Higuerica, Playa de la Rambla Elena, Playa de las Pulgas, Playa de Poniente, Playa del Arroz, Playa del Barranco de la Mar, Playa del Pozo de las Huertas, Playa del Pocico del Animal, Playa del Pozo, Playa El Rafal, Playa del Charco, Playa del Sombrerico, Playa Ensenada de la Fuente, Playa de Calabarrilla, Playa El Hornillo, Playa de Las Delicias, Playa de Levante, Playa del Matalentisco, Playa La Tortuga, Playa de Calarreona, Playa La Carolina and Playa del Pino. Most are small and intimate.

Three kilometres (1.8 mi) northeast of Aguilas is la Isla del Fraile (Monk Island), so named thanks to the similarity of the island's silhouette to a monk's hood. The island has a small rocky beach and a very steep geography. The top of the island gives way to a sudden drop down to the sea on the island's south side. The island was inhabited by the Romans, who used it to export fish byproducts to Rome in amphorae. The remains of a Roman wall are still visible, as are a couple of structures of the early 20th century built by an eccentric British lord who lived on the island and used it for contraband purposes.

Adjacent to the island, on the mainland, is la Playa Amarilla, which is the coastal delineation of La Isla del Fraile residential development. This property was initially developed by Dr. Antonio Sáez Jimenez with basic infrastructure, including construction of the first road over the mountain and down to the beach, as well as the planting of thousands of trees; the development was known as Playa Niagara through the 1970s and 1980s. In the 1970s, graves from the Roman era were discovered near the property's coast, facing the island. The flora in the area is very dry, mostly characterized by shrublands such as the Ziziphus lotus, named Azufaifo locally.

=== Climate ===
Águilas has a hot desert climate (BWh) according to the Köppen climate classification with very mild winters and hot summers. Águilas is one of the very few areas in Europe with a desert climate. The rainfall in winter is very scarce and albeit brief, and summer is the sunniest season being almost rainless. The area around the city is very arid, most of the natural vegetation in the area and nearby hills is characterized by shrublands.

Climate data for Águilas (2009–2025), extremes (2009–present)
Month	Jan	Feb	Mar	Apr	May	Jun	Jul	Aug	Sep	Oct	Nov	Dec	Year
Record high °C (°F)	27.0 (80.6)	27.6 (81.7)	30.1 (86.2)	31.5 (88.7)	32.9 (91.2)	38.1 (100.6)	39.6 (103.3)	39.6 (103.3)	35.5 (95.9)	33.9 (93.0)	31.0 (87.8)	26.2 (79.2)	39.6 (103.3)
Mean daily maximum °C (°F)	17.7 (63.9)	18.1 (64.6)	19.5 (67.1)	21.5 (70.7)	24.7 (76.5)	28.0 (82.4)	30.6 (87.1)	31.1 (88.0)	28.6 (83.5)	25.5 (77.9)	21.3 (70.3)	18.6 (65.5)	23.8 (74.8)
Daily mean °C (°F)	13.1 (55.6)	13.7 (56.7)	15.2 (59.4)	17.4 (63.3)	20.5 (68.9)	24.1 (75.4)	26.9 (80.4)	27.4 (81.3)	24.8 (76.6)	21.4 (70.5)	17.0 (62.6)	14.1 (57.4)	19.6 (67.3)
Mean daily minimum °C (°F)	8.5 (47.3)	9.2 (48.6)	10.8 (51.4)	13.2 (55.8)	16.2 (61.2)	20.1 (68.2)	23.1 (73.6)	23.6 (74.5)	21.1 (70.0)	17.3 (63.1)	12.7 (54.9)	9.6 (49.3)	15.4 (59.8)
Record low °C (°F)	1.4 (34.5)	2.4 (36.3)	3.7 (38.7)	6.7 (44.1)	8.4 (47.1)	14.4 (57.9)	17.2 (63.0)	14.8 (58.6)	15.6 (60.1)	8.4 (47.1)	4.8 (40.6)	2.0 (35.6)	1.4 (34.5)
Average precipitation mm (inches)	15.9 (0.63)	5.9 (0.23)	58.2 (2.29)	18.0 (0.71)	16.8 (0.66)	4.9 (0.19)	1.8 (0.07)	7.2 (0.28)	23.7 (0.93)	13.3 (0.52)	19.7 (0.78)	24.4 (0.96)	209.8 (8.25)
Average precipitation days (≥ 1 mm)	2.3	1.4	4.6	3.4	2.1	1.2	0.2	0.9	2.5	2.5	2.7	2.6	26.4
Average relative humidity (%)	56	55	56	56	52	52	56	57	59	61	57	60	56
Source: Agencia Estatal de Meteorologia (AEMET OpenData)

== History ==
Possibly known in Roman times as Aquilae and later Aquila, Águilas belonged to the community of Bastetania and the province of Hispania Tarraconensis. With little to no local Iberian presence, the Roman town was founded during the Augustan period on the same isthmus where the city lies today. Several structures from the Imperial period, notably two Roman baths, have been discovered in Águilas. In the Late Roman period, the city specialised in the production of amphorae, probably for the transport of fish sauces. During this period, in the 5th century, an impressive construction project began on Isla del Fraile, where a considerable number of rooms for the production of fish sauces have been found.

Various communities settled in Águilas, including the Alans, the Suebi, and the Visigoths. It formed part of the Eastern Roman Empire's Spania until the Arabs conquered the Iberian Peninsula. It was known to the Arabs as آقِلَة (Áqila). It belonged to the Córdoban caliphate and the Kingdom of Valencia, later coming under Almoravidan control, finally ending up definitively included in the Kingdom of Murcia in the 18th century.

During the second half of the 19th century, a vast British colony arrived in Aguilas, an important presence that still lingers. Many of the buildings and much of the infrastructure built by the British still stand, such as the British cemetery, the municipal annex, the Hornillo Pier facing the Isle of Fraile, and the old home of an English merchant located on that island. The minuscule island of Fraile, 100 metres (110 yd) off the coast, was owned by the Scottish banker John Gray, who sold it in 1910 to the British Army Lieutenant Colonel Alexander Borthwick, who in turn transferred ownership to his son Hugh, with the overt aim of exploiting its quarry.

The town as it is now was designed by King Charles III in the 18th century. Of particular note is the Castle of Saint John of the Águilas, which was used as a defence tower by various civilisations who settled there throughout history. The city was extended by the construction of its sister port, maritime walks, and its bays of Levante and Poniente. At the end stands the slender figure of the Chimenea de la Loma (Chimney on the Hill) on the west side of town, a symbol of the mineral boom of the last century. During the Restoration, owing to the great investment by the British, a route was laid between Lorca, Baza and Águilas to transport esparto and other exported minerals, making the town one of the principal ports of the Mediterranean. It is in this period that the Hornillo Pier, a great architectural work of the time made of iron and concrete, was constructed. In the 19th century it was connected by rail to Huércal-Overa; later rail connections were to Lorca and Murcia.

In front of the Hornillo Pier, on the Isle of Fraile, Scottish aristocrat Hugh Pakenham Borthwick, called Don Hugo by the locals, took up residence in 1912. During World War I Borthwick worked as a British spy and alerted a liaison officer whenever a ship from Germany or from a neutral country left the pier carrying iron ore. Following the alert, the ship in question would be sunk by British submarines. After the war, Borthwick left for England, where he died in 1950.

Águilas CF played their games in El Rubial Stadium. Águilas CF was replaced in 2010 by Águilas FC. The stadium seats 4,000 spectators and is the oldest active football stadium in Spain after "El Molinón". Its dimensions are 95 by 65 metres (312 by 213 ft).

Today, the economy of the locality depends principally on summertime tourism by middle-class visitors and the intensive agriculture of greenhouse vegetables.

== Economy ==
24.1% of the surface is used as crop lands and the most widely grown products are lettuces, tomatoes, and citrus. 61% of the agreements were written for jobs of the agriculture and fishing sector in 2015 and 60% were hired as labourers.

== Culture ==
Festivals include:

- Carnival
- Nuestra Señora de los Dolores: Friday before Easter, folk festivals and procession with the holy sculpture of Our Lady.

== Notable people ==
- Francisco Rabal (1926–2001), actor, director and screenwriter
- Alfonso Escámez (1916–2010), president of Banco Central, 1st Marquess of Águilas

== Sports ==
The local football team, Águilas CF is one of the oldest teams in Spain.

== Twin towns ==
- Montcada i Reixac, Spain

== See also ==
- List of municipalities in the Region of Murcia
