= Banco Central Hispano =

Spanish banking company

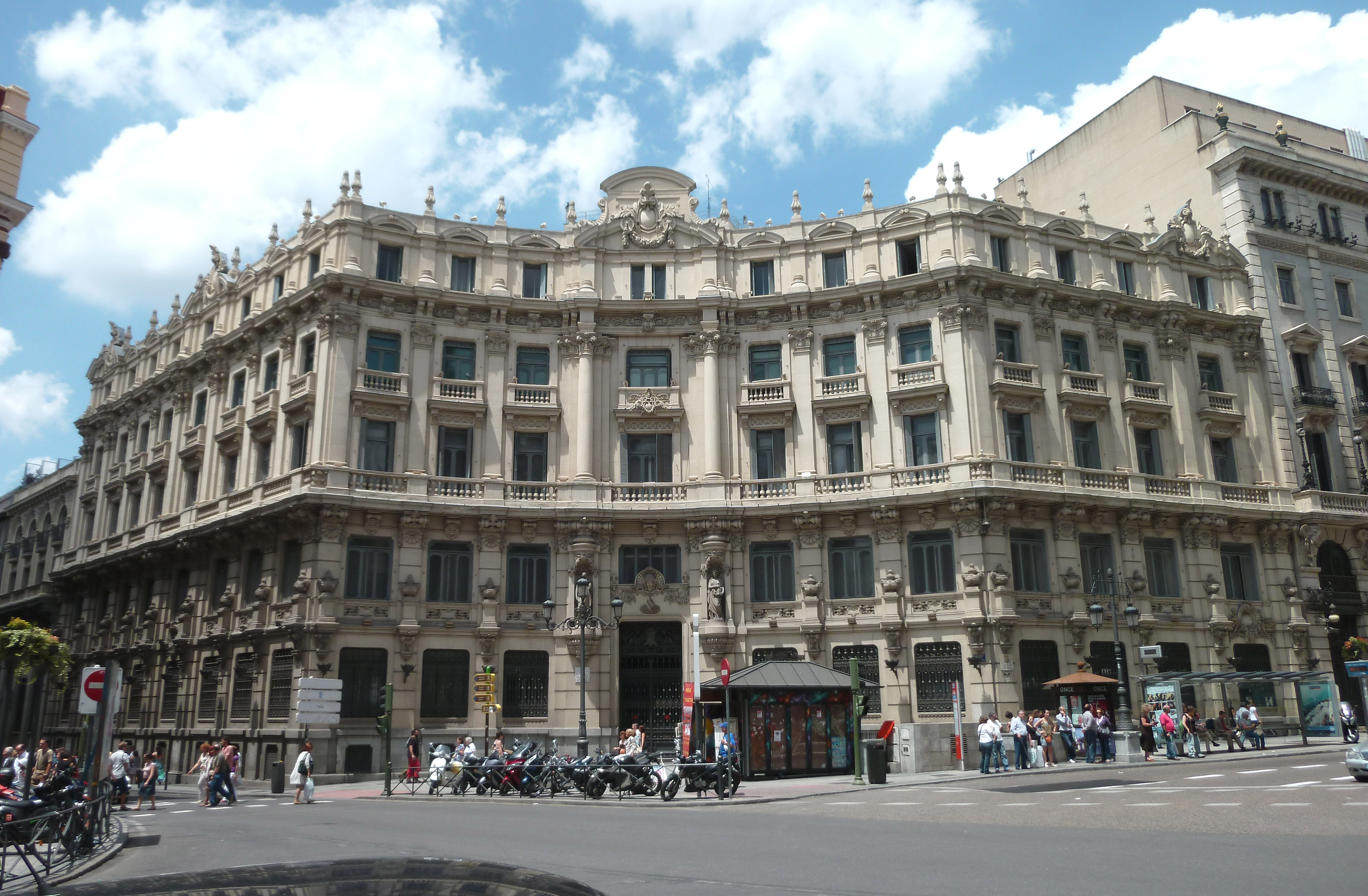
- Former Banco Central Hispano headquarters, since declared Bien de Interés Cultural
- Formerly: Banco Central Hispanoamericano
- Type: S. A.
- Industry: Finance and insurance
- Predecessor: Banco Central and Banco Hispano Americano
- Founded: December 27, 1991
- Defunct: January 15, 1999; 27 years ago
- Successor: Banco Santander Central Hispano
- Headquarters: Madrid
- Services: Financing

Banco Central Hispano was a Spanish bank. In 1999 it was merged with Banco Santander to form Banco Santander Central Hispano. However, the bank group was reverted to refer to itself as Santander Group or Banco Santander in 2007.

== History ==
Both the Banco Central and the Banco Hispano Americano were closely linked to the struggling industrial sector following the first oil crisis. The Banco Central was founded in 1919, growing alongside the Spanish industry, but faced challenges in the 1970s. The Hispano Americano Bank, established in 1900, inherited a portfolio from Banco Urquijo that heavily exposed it to the industrial sector. In 1985, banker Claudio Boada restructured it, shifting its focus to loans and deposits. In 1991, Alfonso Escámez led the Banco Central, while José María Amusátegui was president of the Hispano Americano.

Attempts to merge the two banks began in the 1960s, led by Ignacio Villalonga and Antonio Basagoiti. However, the deal fell through due to concerns from Finance Minister Juan José Espinosa over the resulting bank's power. Another attempt under Luis de Usera and Escámez also failed, as Usera was not convinced by the proposed share exchange after reviewing the financials.

Discussions between the Banco Central (BC) and Hispano Americano Bank (BHA) resumed in 1989 after a failed merger with Banesto. On May 14, 1991, a letter of intent was drafted, outlining the absorption of BHA by BC. Escámez was the first president until September 1992, when Amusátegui took over.

The merger meetings occurred on October 30, 1991, with the official registration of BC's capital increase for the absorption on January 2, 1992. The new "Banco Central Hispano" became Spain's largest private bank, surpassing Bilbao Vizcaya (BBV).

To stabilize during a banking crisis, the new entity sold several inherited banks and appointed Ángel Corcóstegui as CEO in 1994 for restructuring. Central Hispano operated until its merger with Banco Santander was announced on January 15, 1999, forming "Banco Santander Central Hispano." Following this, BCH lost influence; Amusátegui and Corcóstegui both stepped down with substantial severance packages.

== See also ==
- List of banks in Spain
