= Platea Madrid =

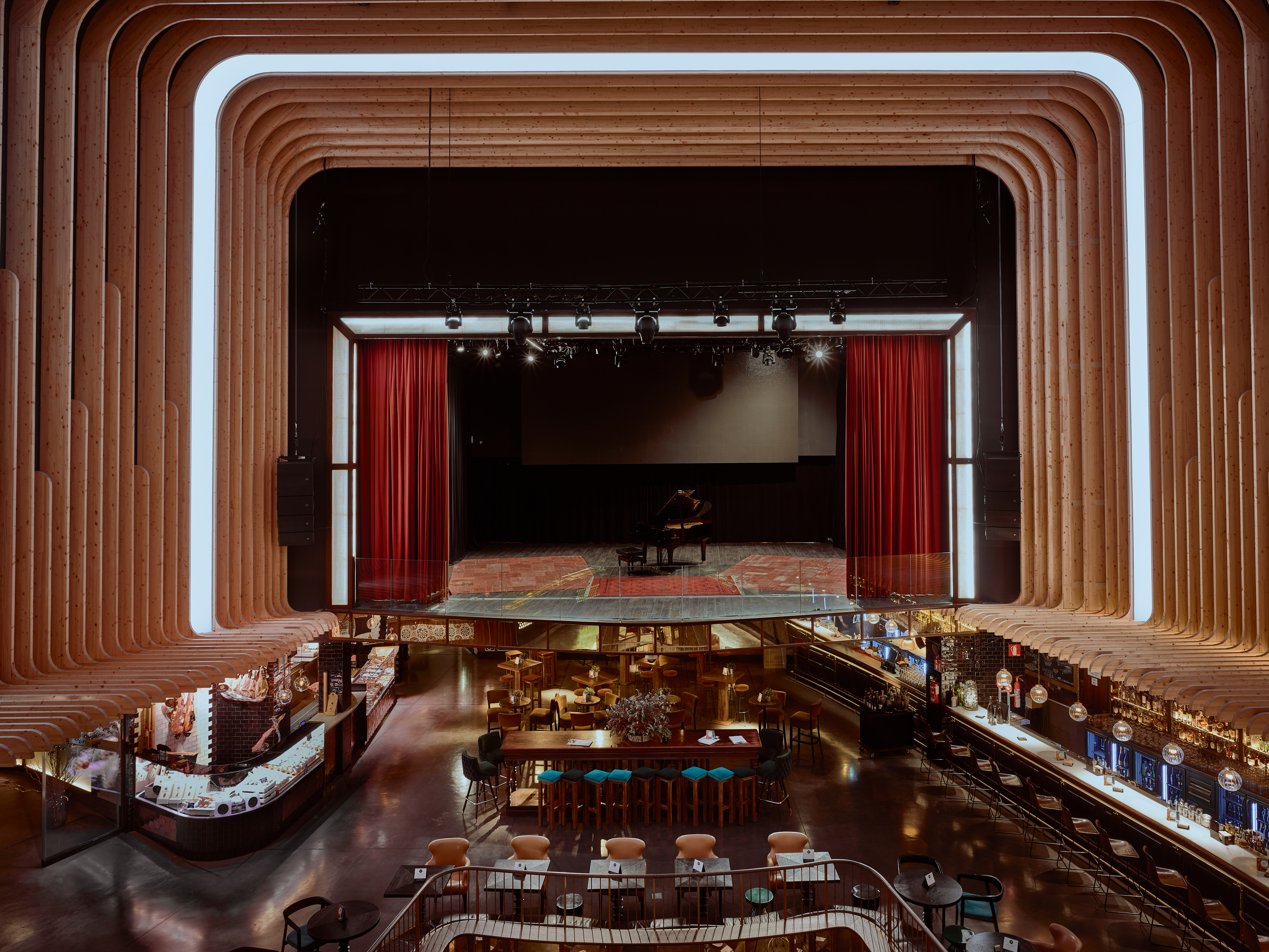

- Location within Madrid

General information
- Location: Calle de Goya 5–7 on Plaza de Colón, Madrid, Spain
- Coordinates: 40.4257466°N 3.6889443°W

Platea Madrid is a gourmet food hall on the Plaza de Colón in Madrid. It is located in a former cinema and employs ca. 380 people. Mexican, Peruvian, Italian, and various Asian cuisines are offered as well as Michelin star restaurateurs Paco Roncero (of restaurant La Terraza del Casino, Madrid), Pepe Solla (Solla, Galicia) and Marcos Morán (Casa Gerardo, Asturias).
