= Isla del Fraile =

Island in Region of Murcia, Spain

Isla del Fraile
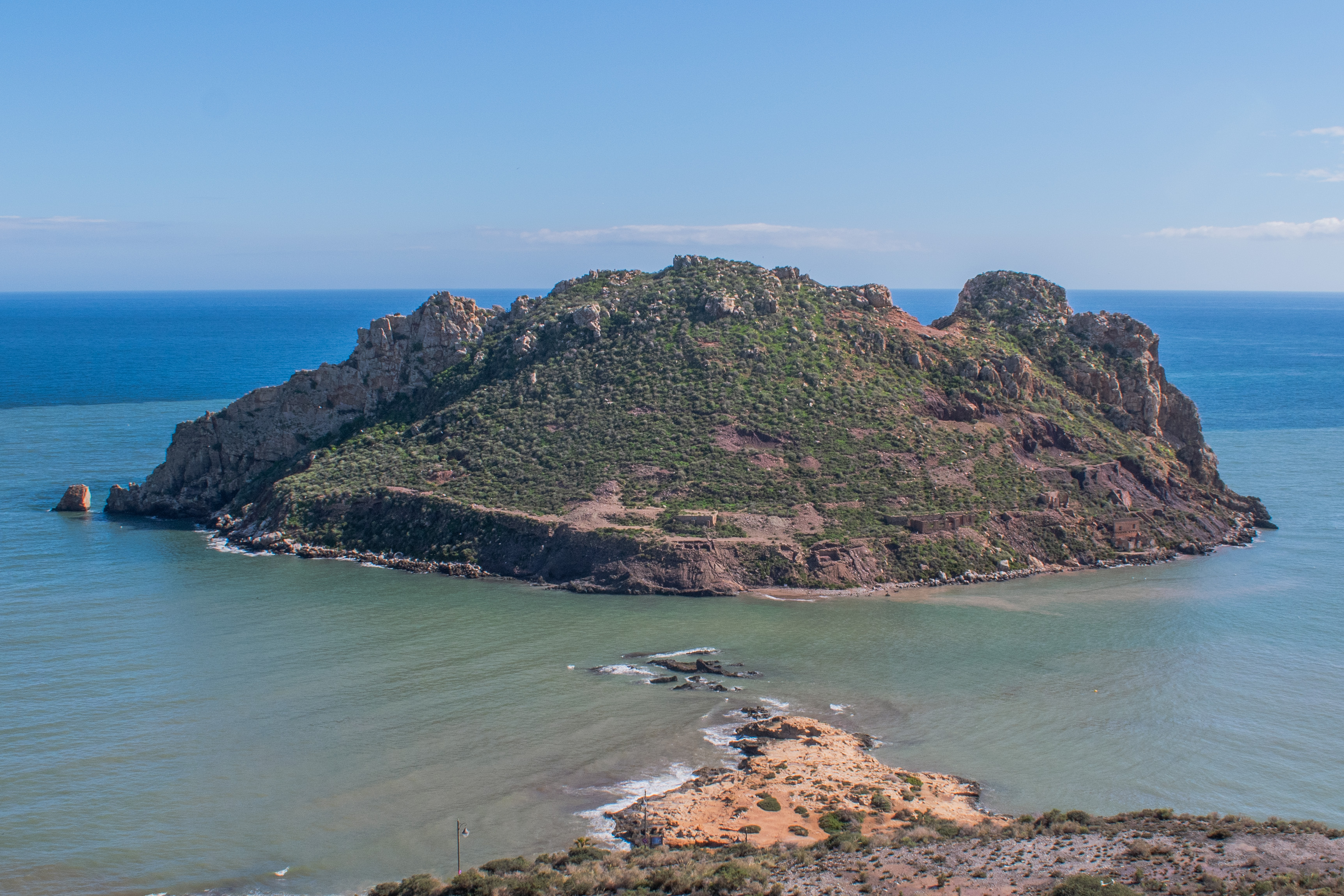
- El Fraile Island seen from the north

- Location in Spain

Geography
- Location: Águilas, Mediterranean Sea
- Coordinates: 37°24′31″N 1°32′48″W
- Area: 0.068 km^{2} (0.026 sq mi)
- Length: 441 m (1447 ft)
- Width: 258 m (846 ft)
- Highest elevation: 92 m (302 ft)

Administration
- Spain
- Autonomous Community: Region of Murcia

Demographics
- Population: 0 (2023)

Isla del Fraile (Friar's Island) is a steep island located east of the urban centre of Águilas (Murcia), Spain. It has infra-Mediterranean vegetation and one of the richest seabeds in the southeast of the peninsula, especially due to its populations of oceanic Posidonia. It is a place of passage and sighting of dolphins and has an important colony of seagulls. Geologically it belongs to the Subbaetic System, as a part of the Maláguide and Alpujárride systems. During the Late Roman period (5th c.), a garum factory was erected in the island, with several processing vats. It has been declared a Protected Natural Area.

It has been proposed that the oronym "Fraile" ("Friar") could have evolved from the term "farellón" (equivalent to farallón, 'sea stack').

It is a popular place for practicing nautical sports due to its particular orography and the protection it offers from the east, the predominant wind on its coast.
