= Former Banco Central Hispano headquarters =

Cultural property in Madrid, Spain

Banco Central Hispano headquarters
- Banco Central Hispano (Spanish)
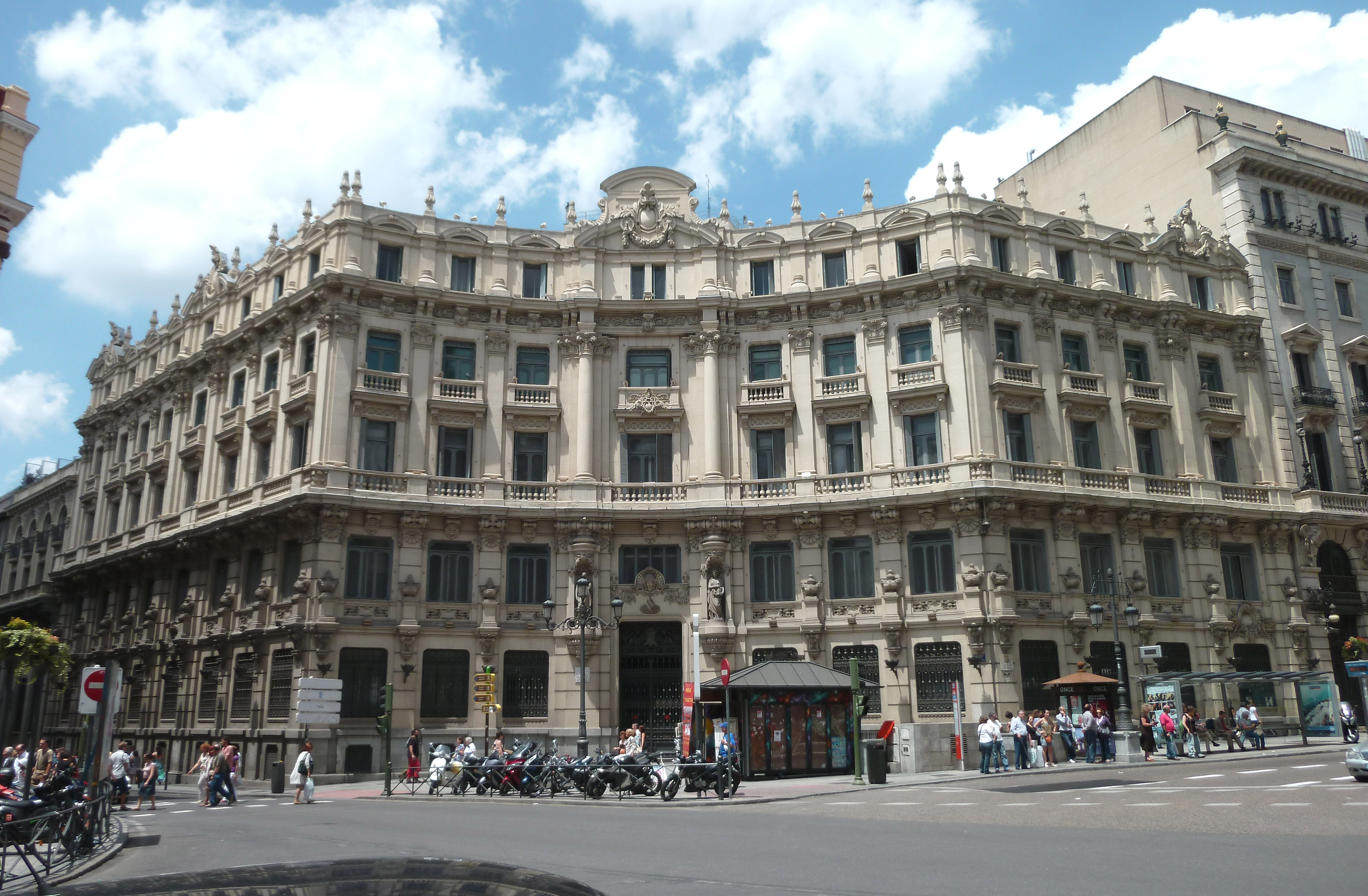

- Location within Spain
- 40.416774°N 3.700673°W
- Location: Madrid, Spain

Site notes
- Architect: José López Sallaberry

Spanish Cultural Heritage
- Official name: Banco Central Hispano
- Type: Non-movable
- Criteria: Monument
- Designated: 1999
- Reference no.: RI-51-0010457

The former headquarters of Banco Central Hispano is located in Madrid, Spain. It was declared Bien de Interés Cultural in 1999.
