= Paco Roncero =

Spanish chef (born 1969)

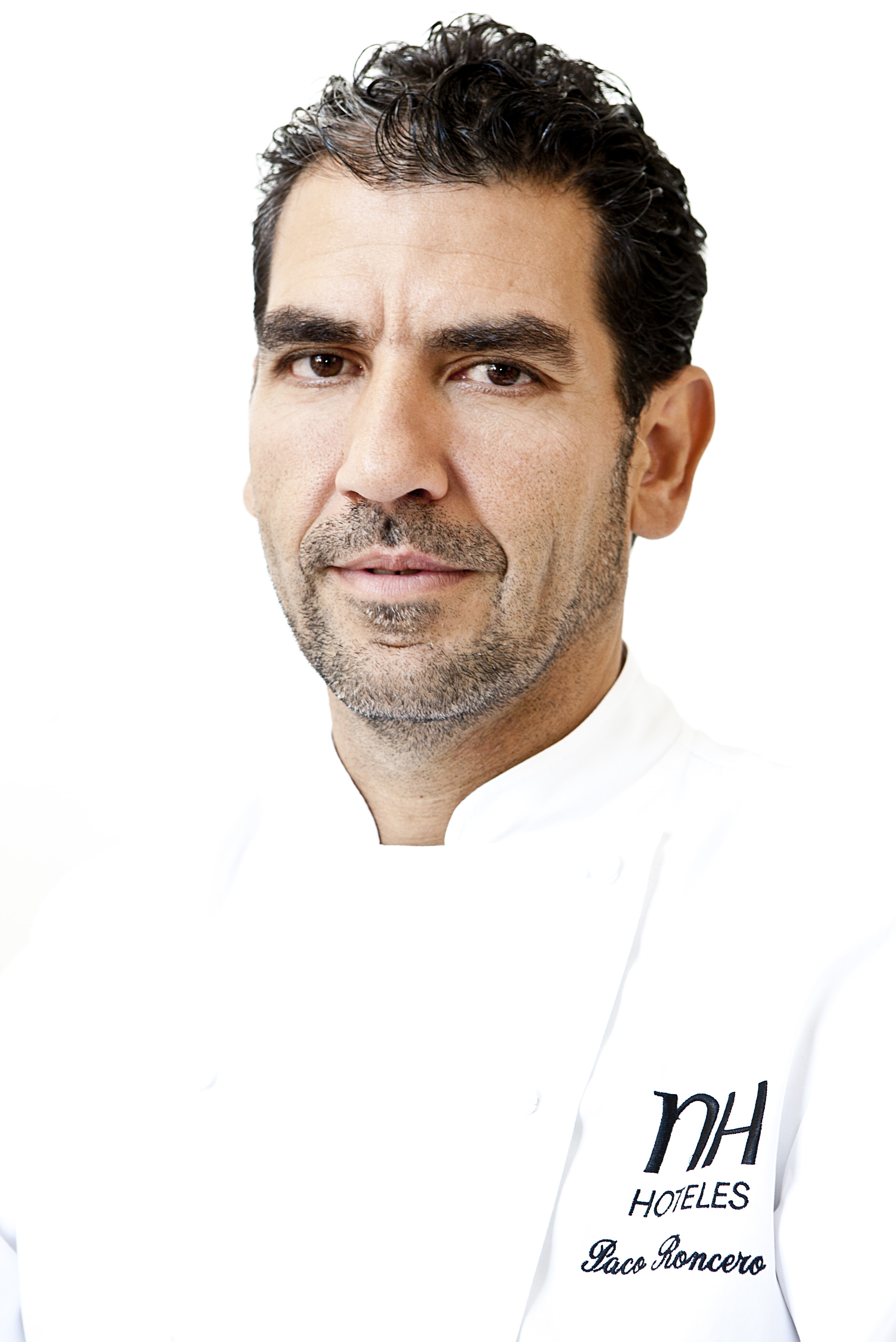
- Paco Roncero
- Born: Francisco Javier Roncero Fernández; 3 December 1969 (age 56); Madrid, Spain
- Spouse: Nerea Ruano
- Culinary career
- Cooking style: Fine dining
- Current restaurant: Sublimotion

Paco Roncero (born 3 December 1969) is a Spanish chef. He won La Real Academia de Gastronomía's National Gastronomy Award in 2006, and he was a judge on the reality television show MasterChef Colombia. He is the head chef of Sublimotion, known for its high cost yet unique dining experience.

== Biography ==
Paco Roncero began his cooking career vocationally. He trained at the School of Hospitality and Tourism of Madrid, and he spent time working at Zalacaín (three Michelin stars) and Hotel Ritz until 1991, when he joined the staff of the Casino de Madrid and worked for some years with Ferran Adrià. In 1996, he became head chef of the banquets department there, and in 2000 he ascended to the rank of head of kitchen, still under the direction of NH Hoteles, including among his responsibilities running La Terraza del Casino, which earned its first Michelin star two years later, in 2002. Roncero has won prestigious culinary awards, including the Chef L'Avenir Award 2005, awarded by the International Academy of Gastronomy.

Roncero is the creator of the kitchen management software Gestor de Cocina (Kitchen Manager) and is the author of several books on cooking and culinary culture. He has led various workshops on culinary research and additionally has worked as a congressman and teacher in a number of schools. Since October 2013, Roncero has been a member of the technical division of the Comité de Honor (Honor Committee) for Spain's Selección de Cocina Profesional, a select group of renown Spanish chefs who participate in World Association of Chefs' Societies and Bocuse d'Or competitions.

In 2014, he opened the restaurant Sublimotion in Ibiza, featuring an immersive dining concept that utilizes video and sound projection, similar to the approach used at chef Paul Pairet's restaurant, Ultraviolet, in Shanghai. Since 2015, the establishment has been widely cited as the most expensive restaurant in the world, with an average price of €2,000 per person.

In April 2015, Spanish television network Antena 3 announced that he would join the culinary reality show Top Chef as a judge, replacing Yayo Daporta for its third season.

In 2022, he served as a judge on the reality competition series Bake Off Celebrity, el gran pastelero: Colombia alongside Juliana Álvarez and Mark Rausch.

In 2023, public broadcaster RTVE confirmed his casting as a judge for the second season of Bake Off: Famosos al horno, appearing alongside Eva Arguiñano and Damián Betular on the Paula Vázquez-hosted show.

== Awards and recognition ==
- La Terraza del Casino has two Michelin stars and three Suns in the Repsol Guide.
- 2006 National Gastronomy Award
- 2005 Best Cook of the Future, awarded by the International Academy of Gastronomy.
- 2005 Award for the best restaurant menu design, granted by the National Academy of Gastronomy
- 2nd place in the Championship of Young Chefs of the Community of Madrid
- 3rd place in the Spanish Cooking Championship
