= Chartered Bank Building, Shanghai =

Building in Shanghai, China

Chartered Bank Building
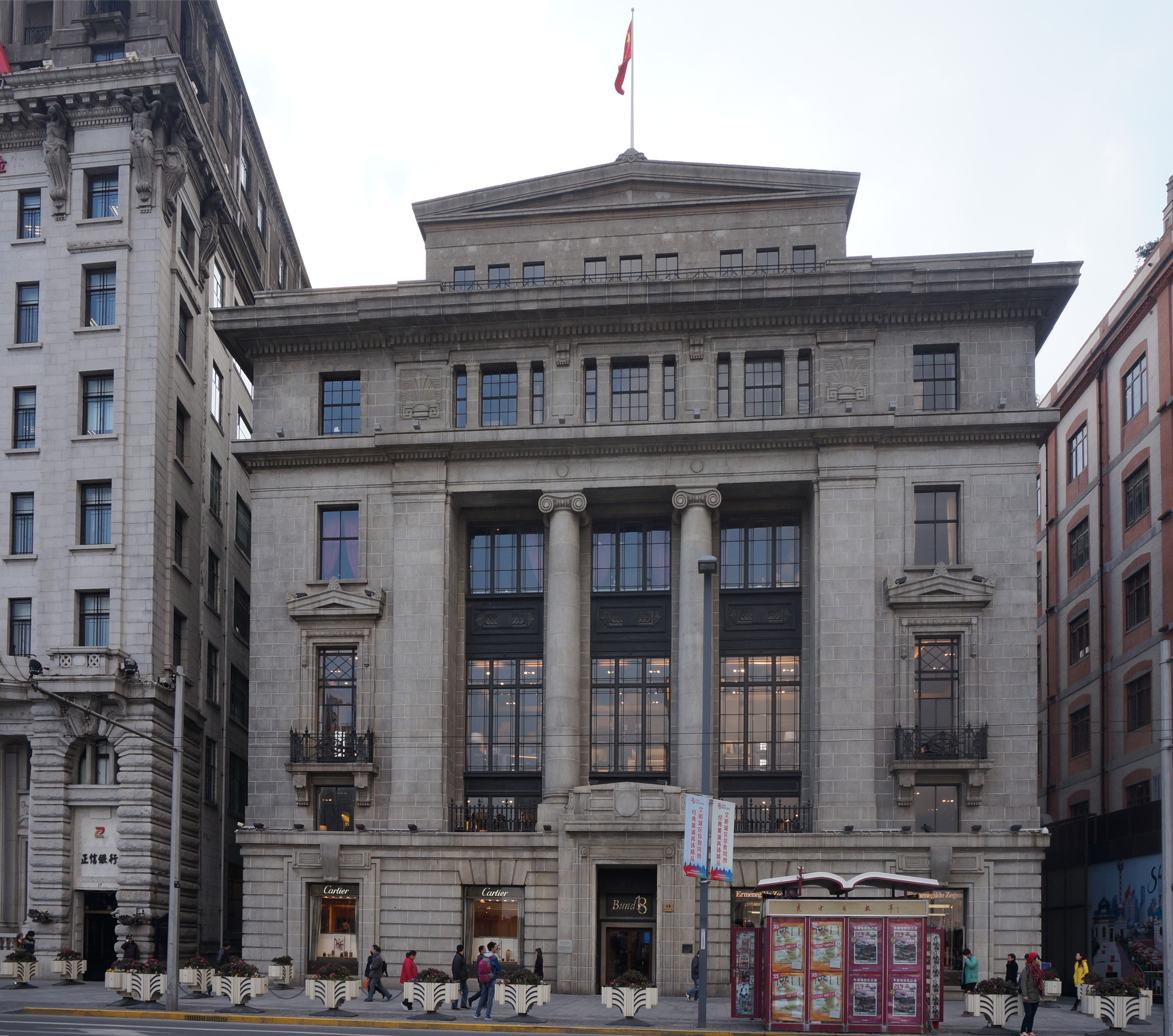
- The building's exterior in 2014
- Interactive map of the Chartered Bank Building area

General information
- Location: Shanghai, China

The Chartered Bank Building, also known as Bund 18, is a building along The Bund in Shanghai, China. The building houses Mr & Mrs Bund.
