= Cecilio Plá =

Spanish painter

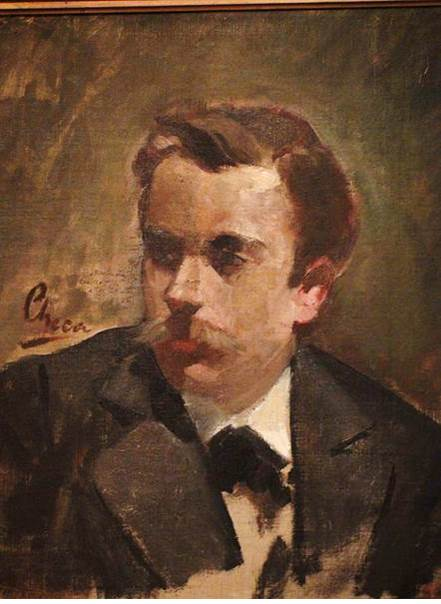
- Cecilio Plá portrait by Ulpiano Checa (1885)
- Born: 22 November 1860; Valencia, Spain
- Died: 4 August 1934 (aged 73); Madrid, Spain
- Education: Instituto San Pablo, the Real Academia de Bellas Artes de San Carlos
- Movement: Costumbrismo

Cecilio Plá y Gallardo (22 November 1860 – 4 August 1934) was a Spanish painter and illustrator.

== Biography ==
Cecilio Plá was born in Valencia. As a child, he studied music at the Escuela de Artesanos de Valencia, in accordance with the wishes of his father, who was the bandleader and arranger for the Teatro Principal. Later, he followed his own desires to be an artist and continued his studies at the Instituto San Pablo and the Real Academia de Bellas Artes de San Carlos. After winning a silver medal at the Exposición de Valencia in 1879, he moved to Madrid with a friend, where he entered the Real Academia de Bellas Artes de San Fernando, becoming a student of Emilio Sala.

Cecilio with his wife Valentina and their daughters Pepita & Cristina

The following year, after travelling through Portugal, France and Italy, he settled in Rome. From there, he sent home numerous works, mostly in the Costumbrismo genre, which showed the influence of Marià Fortuny. Some were shown at the National Exhibition of Fine Arts, winning medals in 1884 and 1887 for paintings on Italian subjects. He received many more medals over the next two decades, including a Medal of Honor at the Exposition Universelle (1900). From 1893 to 1910, he drew illustrations for several periodicals, including La Ilustración Española y Americana, and Blanco y Negro.

In 1910, he began his career as a teacher at the Academy of San Fernando, succeeding Sala in the Chair of "Color Aesthetics and Painting Procedures", which he held until his retirement in 1931. He was named an Academician in 1924. His dedication to teaching drastically reduced his artistic output. Juan Gris was, perhaps, his best-known student. He also published a "Pictorial Art Primer".

In addition to his paintings and drawings, he worked on many public projects, completing the work begun by Sala at the Casino de Madrid and providing decorations for the Círculo de Bellas Artes. He died in Madrid, aged 73.

== Selected paintings ==
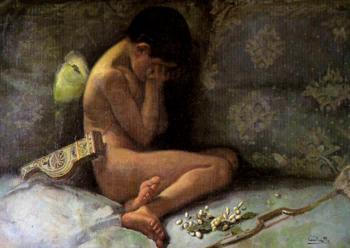
Nude Child

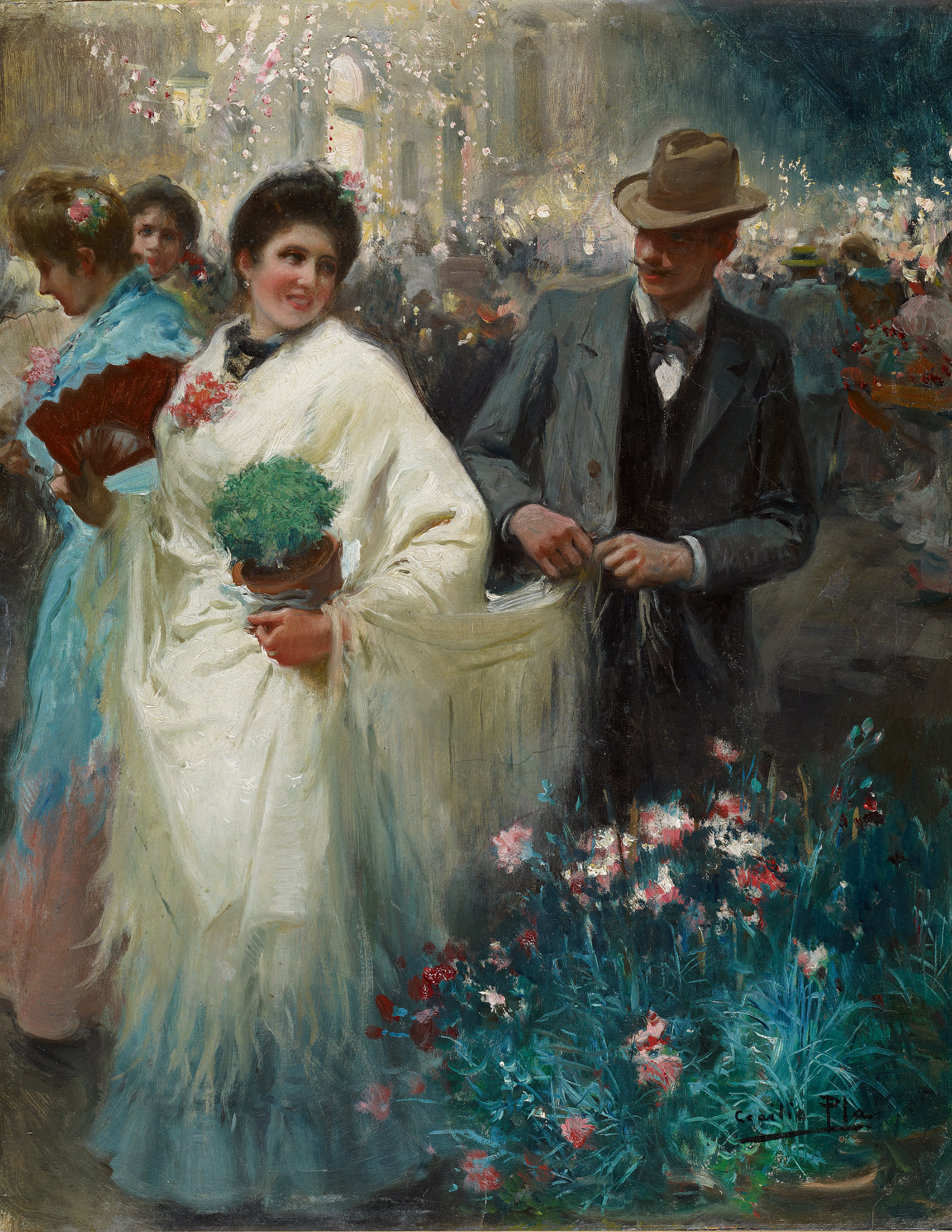
Verbena

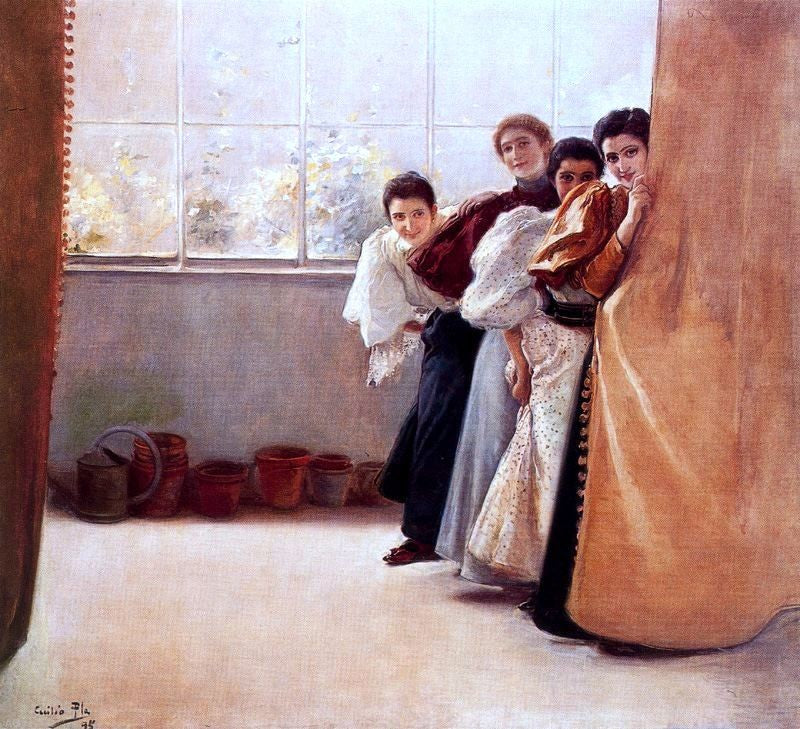
Hiding

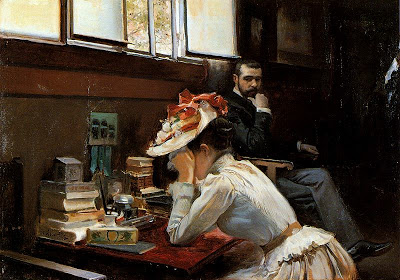
Honeymoon

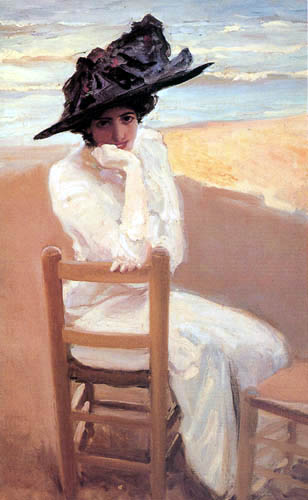
Lady on the Beach

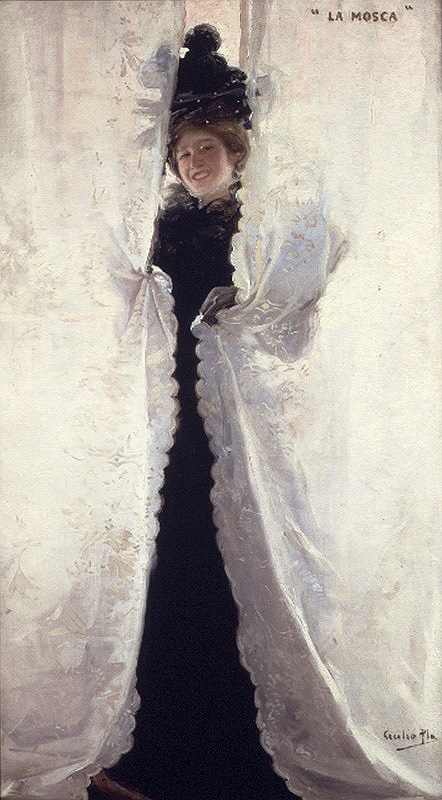
The Fly
