= José López Sallaberry =

Spanish architect and urbanist (1858–1927)

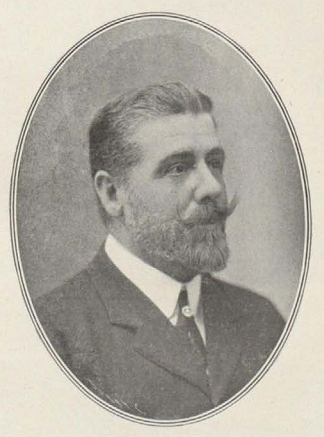
López Sallaberry; from La Ilustración Financiera (c. 1904)

José López Sallaberry (16 December 1858, Madrid - 22 June 1927, Madrid) was a Spanish architect and urbanist who worked in the Neoplateresca style.

== Life and work ==
He began his studies in 1875 at the Higher Technical School of Architecture of Madrid and obtained the title of Architect in 1881. In 1888, he was put in charge of site preparation for what is now known as the Cementerio de la Almudena.

Among his most familiar buildings are the Edificio ABC Serrano (1894) and two theaters; the Teatro El Dorado and the Teatro Fontalba, which display his eclecticism. He was also responsible for the restoration of the façade of the Teatro de la Comedia, following a disastrous fire in 1915. The Casino de Madrid and the Banco Hispano Americano have both been designated a Spanish Property of Cultural Interest. After 1904, he was an Academician at the Real Academia de Bellas Artes de San Fernando.

In his role as an urban planner, his most notable work involved the initial layout of the Gran Vía; performed in collaboration with Francisco Andrés Octavio. This project kept him occupied from 1905 until his death. He also oversaw the transference of the Fuente de Cibeles to its present location.

He was married to María Monasterio and they had three daughters. He died at his home on the Calle de la Montera and was interred at the Saint Isidore Cemetery.

== Selected projects ==
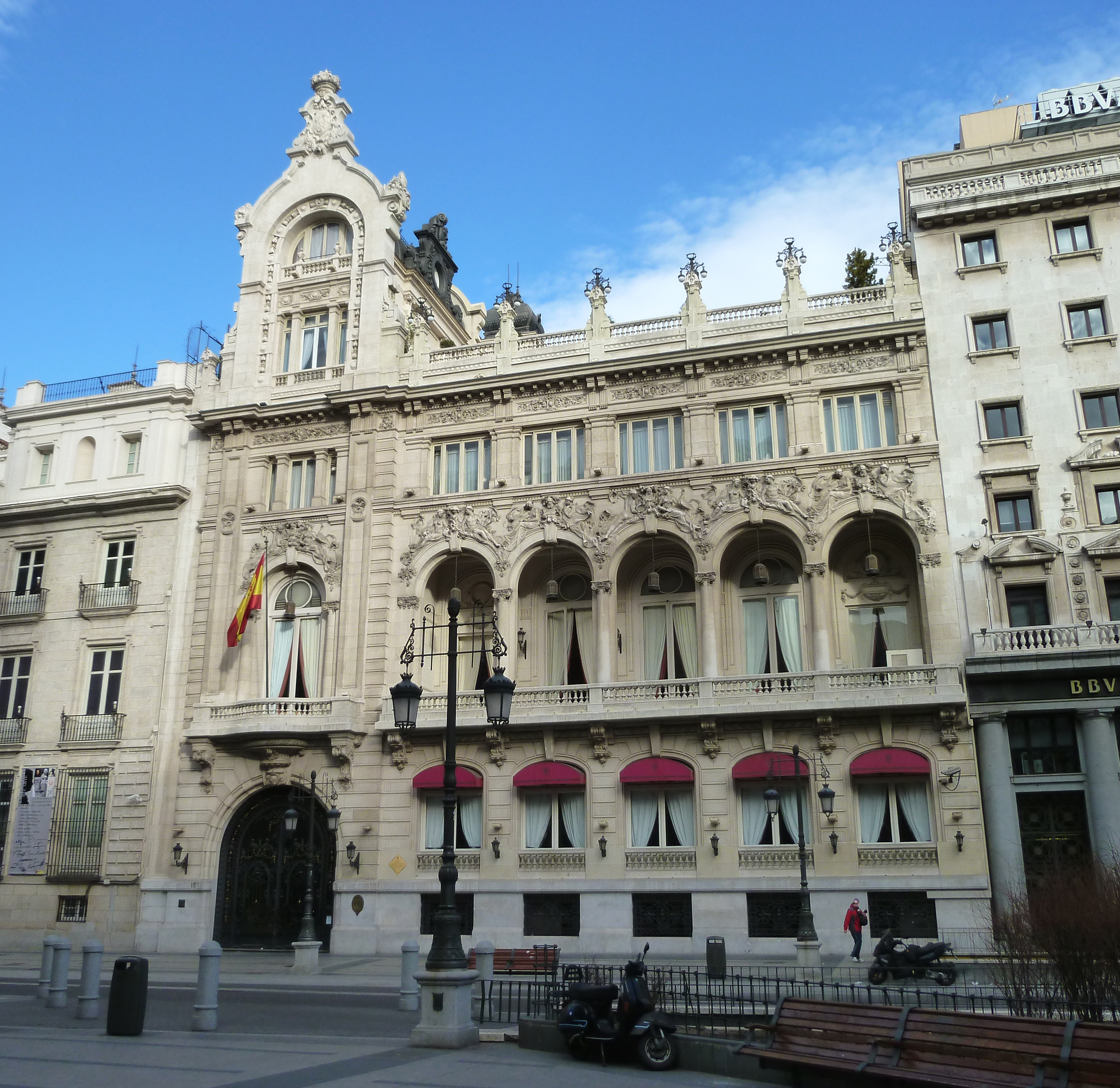
Casino de Madrid

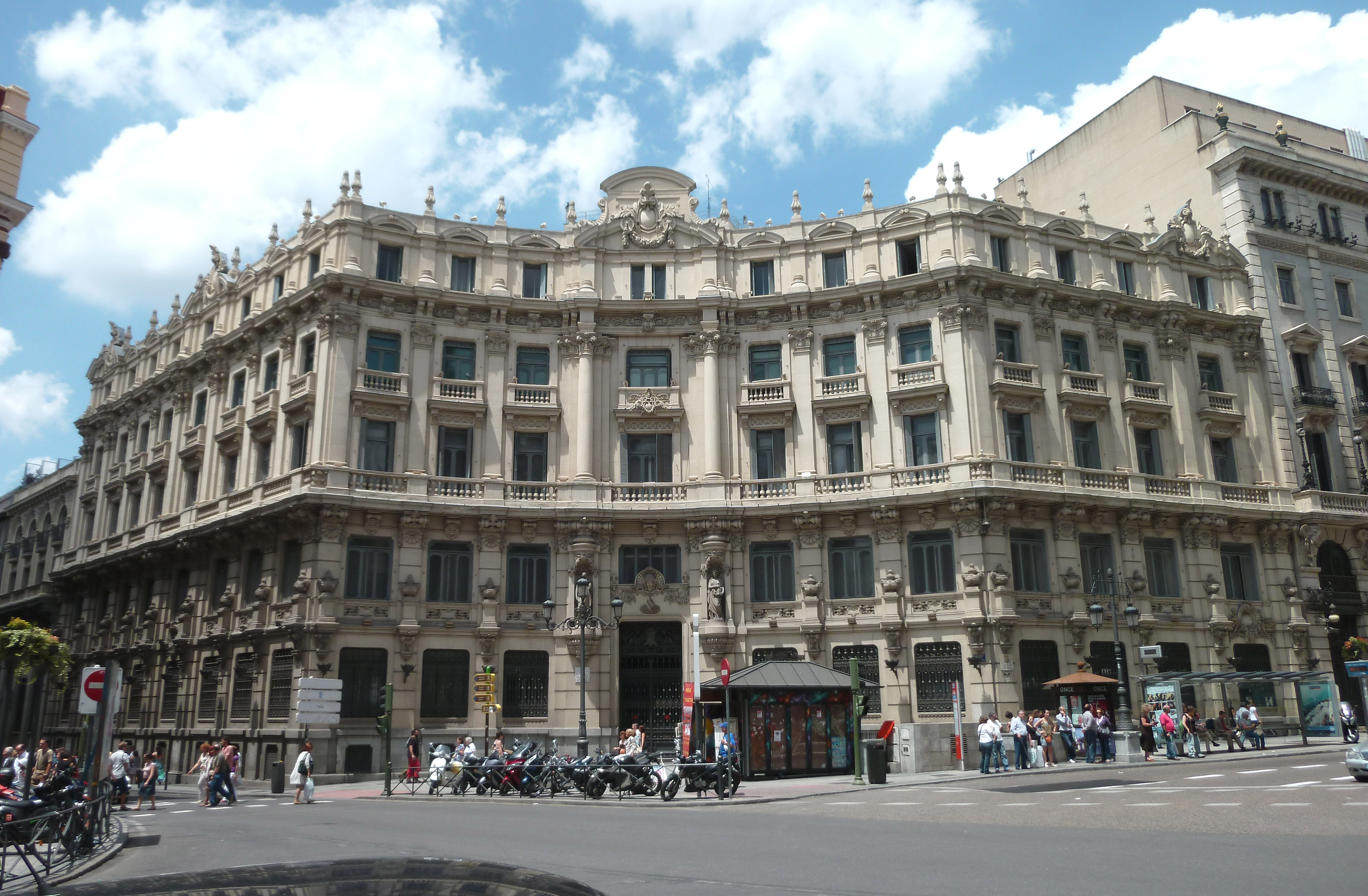
Banco Hispano Americano

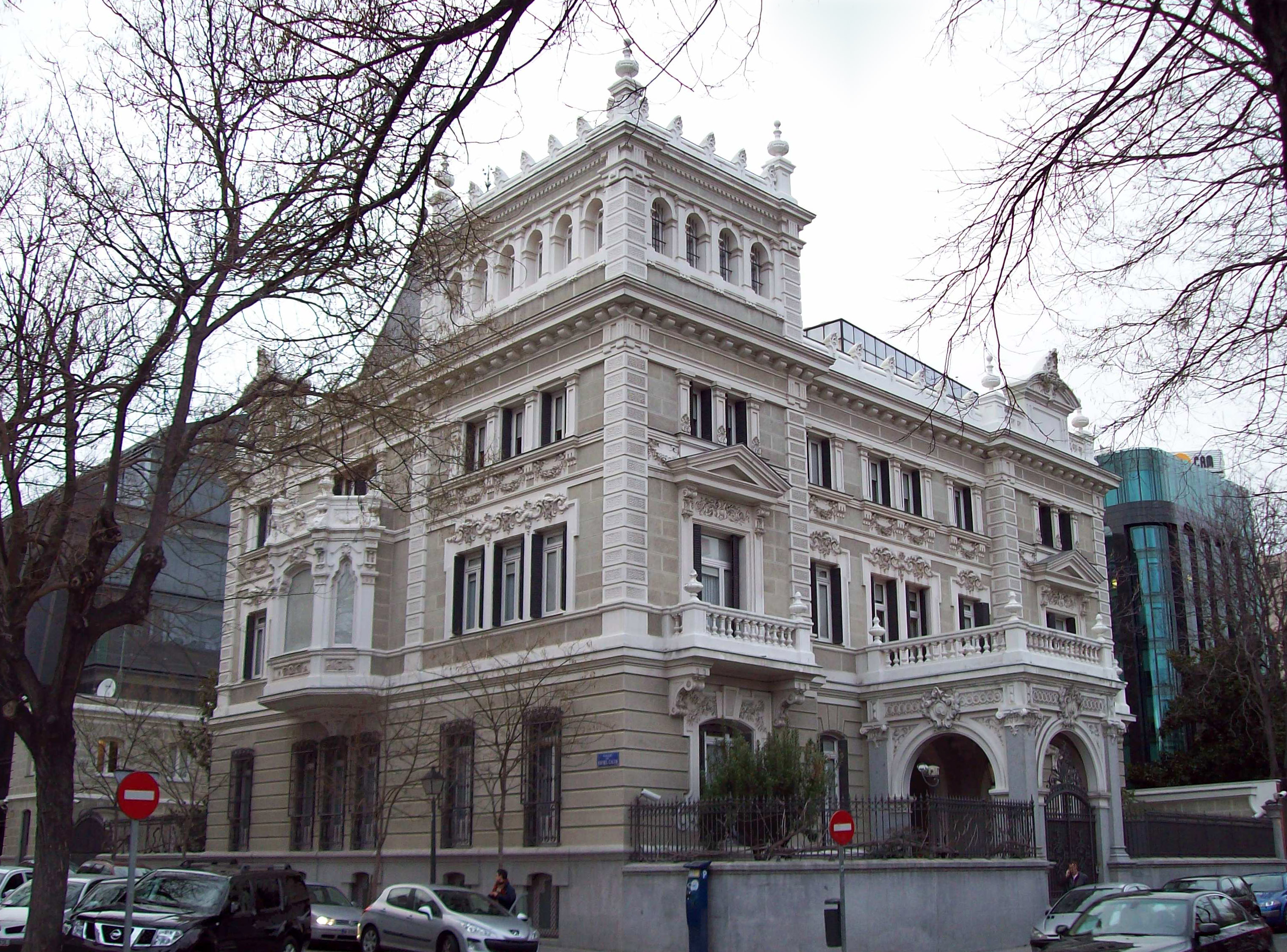
Mansion of Eduardo Adcoch

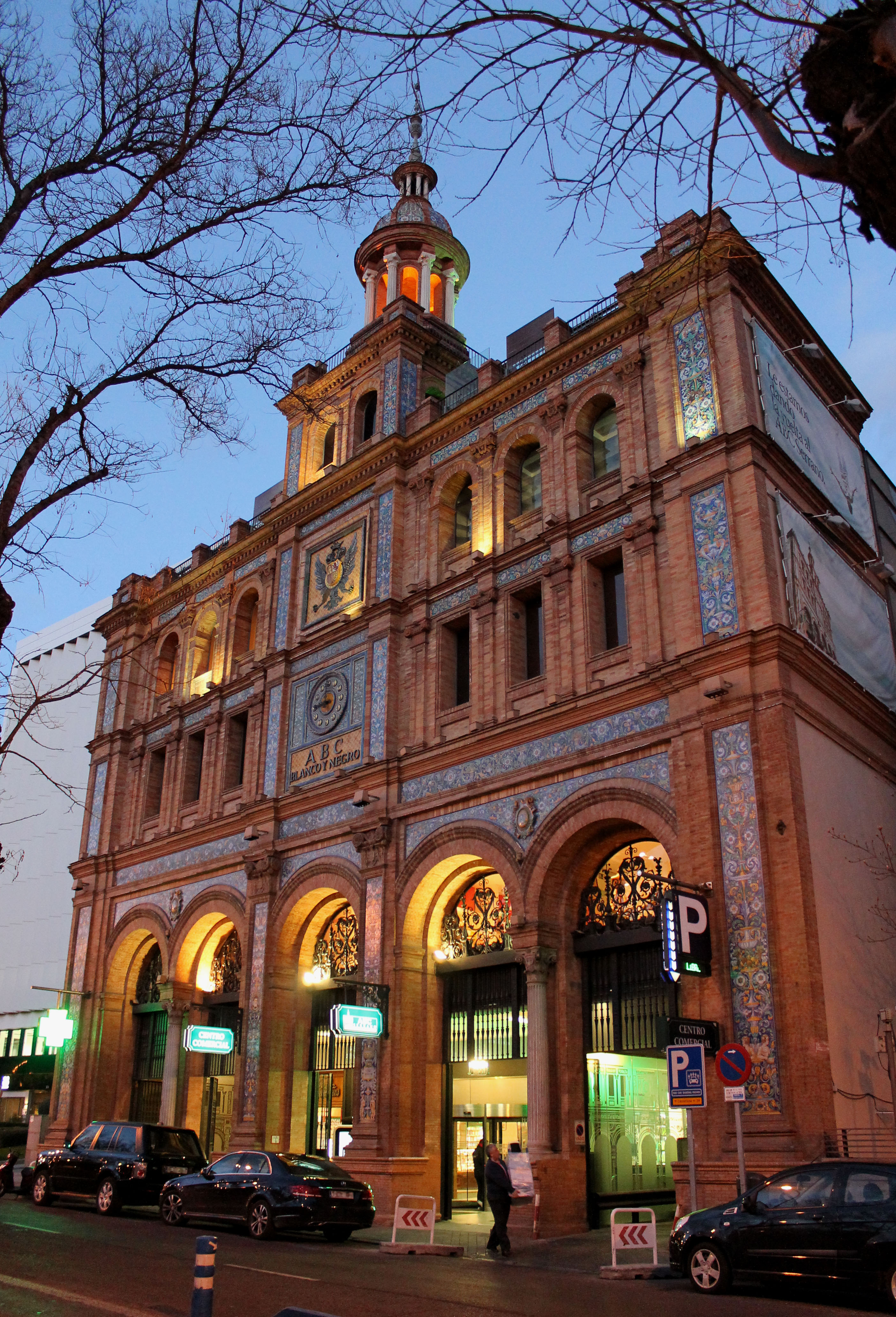
Edificio ABC Serrano
