= Mr & Mrs Bund =

Restaurant information
- Chef: Paul Pairet
- Food type: French
- Location: Shanghai, China
- Website: mmbund.com

Mr & Mrs Bund is a French restaurant by chef Paul Pairet in Shanghai's Chartered Bank Building, in China. Frommer's has rated the restaurant 2 out of 3 stars.

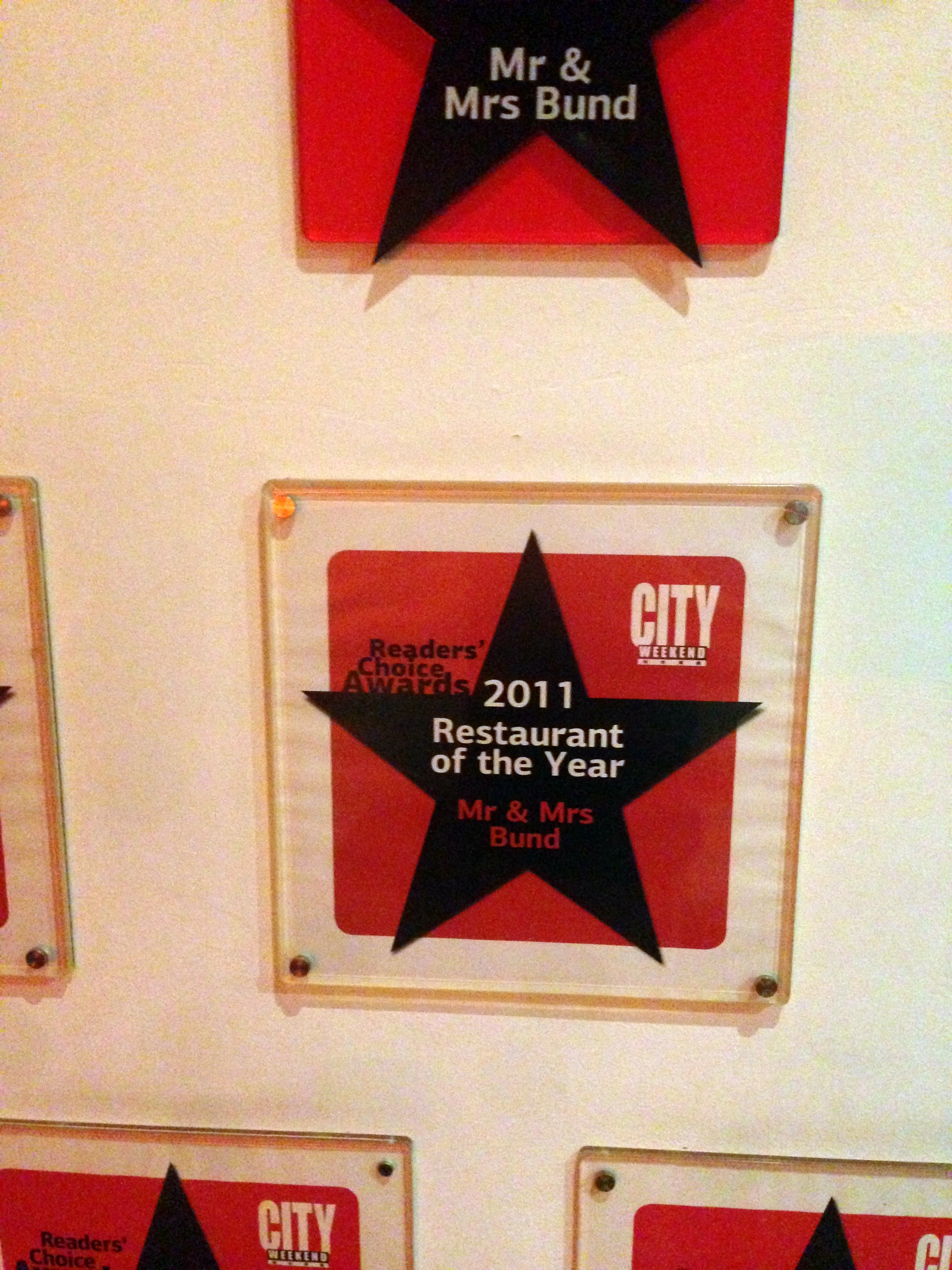

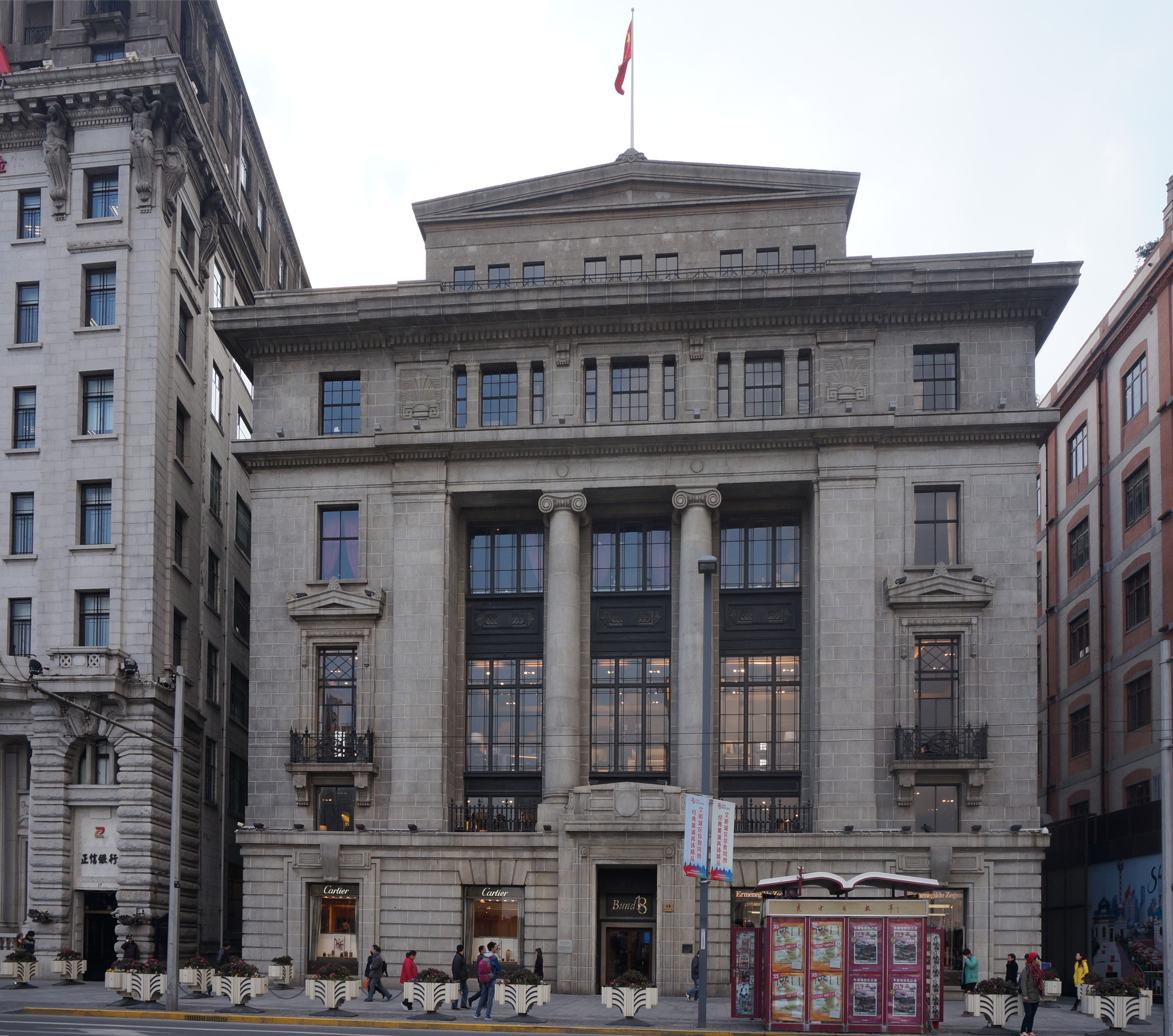
Chartered Bank Building

== See also ==
- List of French restaurants
