= Paul Pairet =

French chef

- Born: 29 June 1964 (age 61); Perpignan, France
- Education: Hotel school
- Culinary career
- Cooking style: French cuisine avant-garde
- Rating(s): Michelin stars
- Current restaurant(s): Ultraviolet by Paul Pairet Mr & Mrs Bund Polux by Paul Pairet
- Website: www.paulpairet.com

Paul Pairet (born 29 June 1964) is a French chef. He is the founder-partner and chef de cuisine of restaurants Mr & Mrs Bund, Ultraviolet, and cafe Polux, all located in Shanghai, China. His cuisine is often described as avant-garde.

== Biography ==
Pairet was born in Perpignan and studied at a hotel school in Toulouse after a scientific study background. A chef/instructor who demonstrated diffusion and biochemical reactions in cooking impressed him as a student, and he decided to become a chef.

== Restaurants ==
Pairet was first noticed by the press while helming Café Mosaic in Paris in 1998. Over the next 15 years, he also worked in Istanbul, Hong Kong, Sydney, and Jakarta. In 2005, he settled in Shanghai to open Jade on 36, an avant-garde restaurant in the Pudong Shangri-La Hotel until he left in 2008.

In April 2009, he opened Mr & Mrs Bund in the Bund 18 building, where he has been lauded for his witty takes on bistro classics. The restaurant was ranked the 7th best in Asia and the 43rd best in the world in 2013, making it the first restaurant in Mainland China to be ranked on the World's 50 Best Restaurants list. In 2014: No. 11 in Asia's 50 Best Restaurants, and No. 76 in the world's list. In 2015: No. 21 in Asia's 50 Best Restaurants. In 2016: No. 28 in Asia's 50 Best Restaurants. Since 2016, it has become one of the members of Collège Culinaire de France.

In February 2010, Pairet presented his idea for a restaurant of one table that used technology to offer an immersive, multi-sensory dining experience in public for the first time, at the OFF5 Omnivore Food Festival in Deauville, France.

After planning and development since 1996, this idea became the restaurant Ultraviolet, which opened in Shanghai in an undisclosed location in May 2012. The restaurant's unique concept is based on Pairet's theory of “psycho-taste”, or the psychology and emotions associated with food. He believes that our perception of taste can be altered through engaging different senses and emotional triggers as we eat, and has been quoted as saying “Food is ultimately about emotion, and emotion goes beyond taste.”

Ultraviolet was ranked the 8th best restaurant in Asia by Asia's 50 Best Restaurants list in both 2013 and 2014, and the 60th best restaurant in the world in 2013, and the 58th in 2014. In 2015: No. 3 in Asia's 50 Best Restaurants, and No. 24 in The World's 50 Best Restaurants. In 2016: No. 7 in Asia's 50 Best Restaurants, and No. 42 in The World's 50 Best Restaurants. In 2017: No. 8 in Asia's 50 Best Restaurants, and No. 41 in The World's 50 Best Restaurants. In 2018: No. 8 in Asia's 50 Best Restaurants and winner of Art of Hospitality Award, and No. 24 in The World's 50 Best Restaurants. In 2019: No. 6 in Asia's 50 Best Restaurants, and No. 48 in The World's 50 Best Restaurants.

On 21 September 2017, the second edition of Michelin Guide Shanghai released the result for 2018, and Ultraviolet received three Michelin stars, which still remain now. Since October 2014, Ultraviolet has been one of the members of Les Grandes Tables du Monde. In 2018, it was one of world's greatest places released by Time.

In February 2017, Pairet launched a carvery The Chop Chop Club with Unïco Shanghai. Pairet featured whole pieces of meat and fish for mains, carved and served at the peak of the dishes – "released based on a nightly schedule, the names and times of which are displayed with prices and available portions on a digital screen with live updates of 'buy now' and 'sold out' statuses." with "some larger pieces to be shared between different, unconnected tables" or to be served as whole for an entire table. It was closed due to the closure of Unïco Shanghai in September 2018.

In mid-March 2019, Pairet opened an all-day dining, French cafe called Polux, in Xintiandi Shanghai.

== Appearance and activities ==
Pairet was one of the chef juries for the S. Pellegrino Young Chef 2018.

Pairet appeared as a guest judge in the 5th episode of Top Chef France Season 10 which was released on 6 March 2019. The contestants were given a challenge to make a dish based on Pairet's Twin Concept, a mirror dish called "Tomato Mozza And Again" which has been served at Ultraviolet. He went on to become one of the jury members in Season 11, and Season 12.

== Awards and honors ==
Lifetime Achievement Award, 2013 Asia’s 50 Best Restaurants, a list affiliated with the World's 50 Best Restaurants; Chefs' Choice Award in 2016.

The 100 Chefs by Le Chef magazine since 2015

Restaurateur of the Year 2018, Les Grandes Tables Du Monde

The 50 most influential French people in the world in 2019 by Vanity Fair France.

La Légion d'Honneur, decorated by Philippe Etchebest on the 26th of May 2025
