= Alfonso Escámez, 1st Marquess of Águilas =

Alfonso Escámez
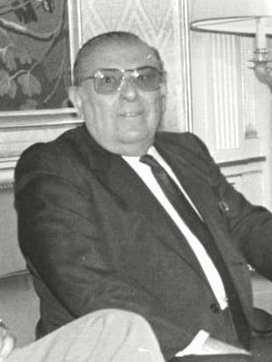
- Alfonso Escámez in 1988

Senator in the Cortes Generales by appointment of King Juan Carlos I

Marquess of Águilas
- In office June 15, 1977 – January 2, 1979

Personal details
- Born: Alfonso Escámez y López; January 1, 1916 Águilas, Spain
- Died: May 16, 2010 (aged 94) Madrid, Spain
- Occupation: Politician, businessperson, banker

Alfonso Escámez, 1st Marquess of Águilas (1 January 1916 – 16 May 2010) was a Spanish banker. He was the president of Banco Central from 1973 until 1992. He was awarded the title "Marquess of Águilas" by King Juan Carlos I.

Escámez died on 16 May 2010, at the age of 94.
