= Casino de Madrid =

Building in Madrid

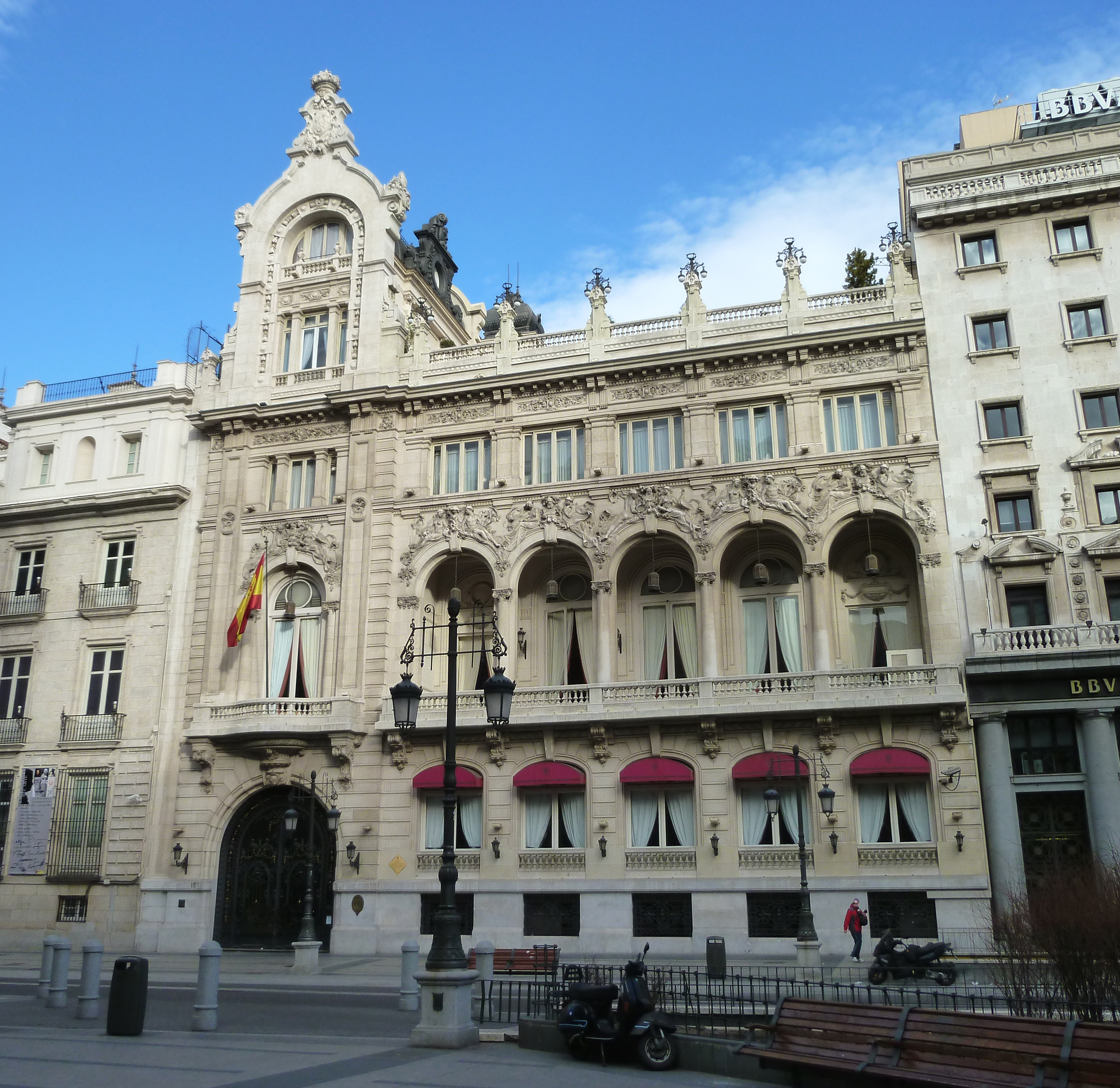
- Exterior view in 2011

- Location within Spain
- 40.417777°N 3.700228°W
- Location: Madrid, Spain

Site notes
- Architect: José López Sallaberry

Spanish Cultural Heritage
- Official name: Casino de Madrid
- Type: Non-movable
- Criteria: Monument
- Designated: 1993
- Reference no.: RI-51-0006877

The Casino de Madrid is currently located in Madrid, Spain on number 15 Calle de Alcalá. It was born as a social club in 1836, outside of politics and with the intention of being a place where its members could congregate in peace. It was declared Bien de Interés Cultural in 1993.

== History ==
The year 1836 is the official start of the club's activities because it was then it was endowed, for the first time, with internal statutes and regulations. The Casino arose at a time in which the spirit of association was appearing in Europe. This period was marked by the creation of new societies that abandoned the traditional 18th century institutional model based on enlightened academies that were created for the recreation of the upper classes. The Casino had in its beginnings in several venues, all of them located throughout diverse premises in central Madrid. The name of the society also underwent changes, starting as simply Casino, later being designated Casino del Príncipe (due to its initial location on calle del Príncipe), until finally adopting the name "Casino de Madrid". The austere decoration of the first Society location was replaced by progressively more elegant and luxurious locales. The birth of the Casino coincided with a political period of transition in which the liberal state arose in Spain from the Old Regime. Hence the Casino, being a liberal organization, became a model to follow in provincial capitals in the Spain of the late 19th century.

It would not be until the year 1910 (after a long construction process that lasted five years) that it would move into its current headquarters on Calle de Alcalá, just when the casino was reaching a thousand members. This casino venue is a richly decorated building that offers various luxury social services to its club members. The headquarters of the Casino became a space for the representation of the Madrid elite of the time, capable of generating social capital among its members. The premises of Calle de Alcalá were, in short, a meeting point for the club members. At the end of the 20th century, it underwent a period of decline which was escaped by a rethinking in the management of the Society: The coexistence of the activity of the partners with private social activities managed by a concession company called Gran Círculo. This company is in charge of the operation of some of the services of the Casino. In 1993 the building and its content were declared an Bien de Interés Cultural. At present it is a space that hosts various social events, such as celebrations, conferences, and official visits. All of them coexisting with the society of current club members.

== Architecture and building ==
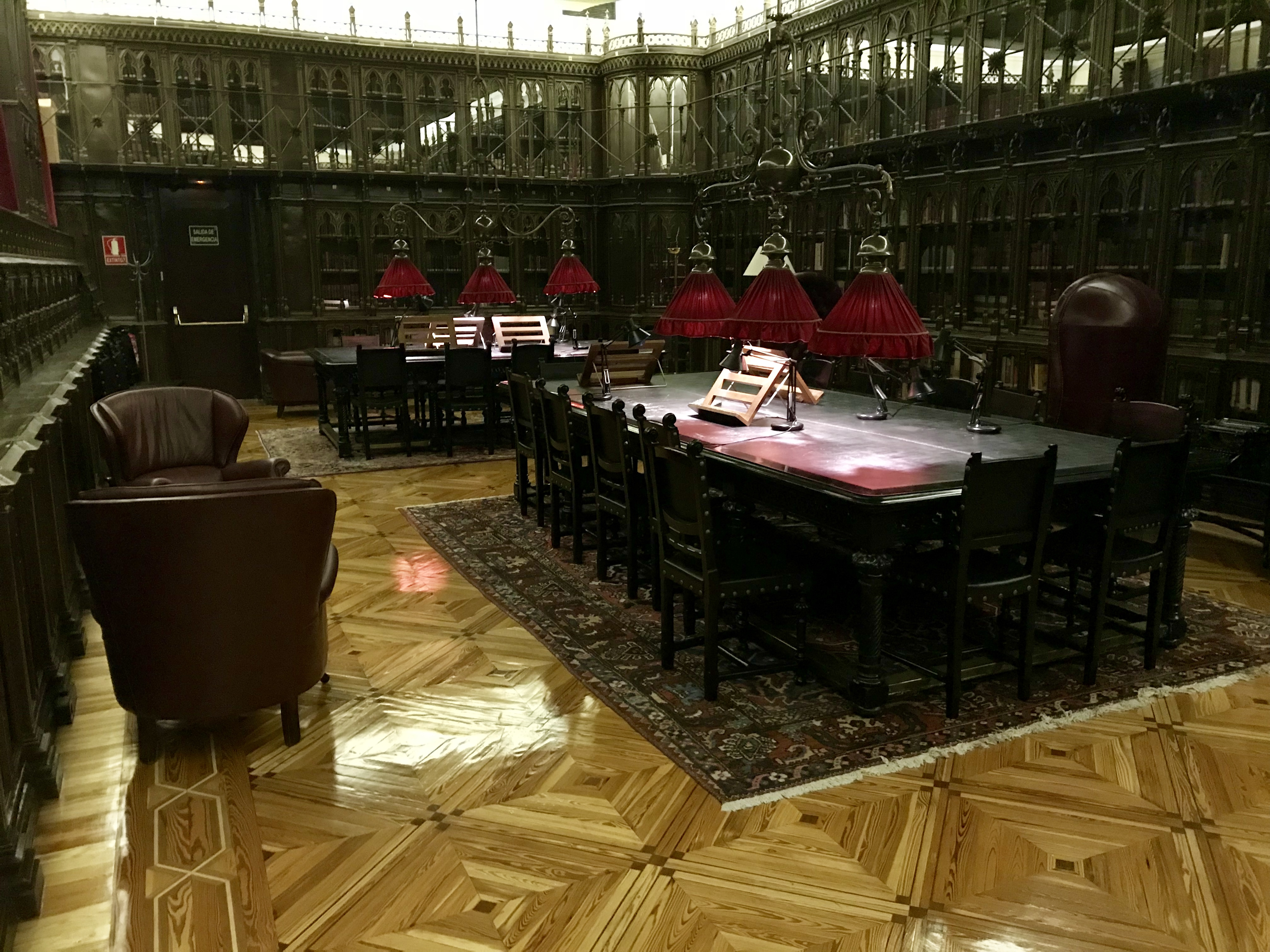
Neo-Gothic library made of wrought iron by the Asins metalworks company, originally created for the former Casino premises in the nearby Palacio de la Equitativa.

The building of the Casino de Madrid, facing Calle de Alcalá, was designed in the early 20th century in a late eclectic style influenced by European Modernism. It was conceived in 1903 as a prominent urban belvedere and was designated a Bien de Interés Cultural in 1993.

The exterior features a former carriage entrance with wrought-iron gates. Inside, the main architectural element is the Escalera de Honor (Grand Staircase), designed by José López Sallaberry and sculpted by Ángel García Díaz. The building contains nine principal halls with a total capacity of about 1,200 people, including the Salón Real and the Puerta del Sol Hall, decorated by Antonio Gomar. Facilities also include dining rooms, billiard rooms, card rooms, a library, administrative offices, a gym, and sauna. Interior decoration includes paintings by Emilio Sala, Cecilio Plá, Álvarez de Sotomayor and Romero de Torres, sculptures by Mateo Inurria and Mariano Benlliure, stained glass by Maumejean, carpets from the Real Fábrica de Tapices, and furniture by Víctor Laborde, Robert Gillow and the jewellers Mellerio dits Meller.

== Membership ==
The Casino de Madrid was established as a private social club for the upper classes in the late 19th and early 20th centuries. It originally operated as a male-only institution. Admission was restricted and based on a sponsorship system ("padrinazgo"), requiring nomination by an existing member. Members are traditionally known as "casinistas". Full members ("socios de número") paid fees and held voting rights, while temporary members included foreign diplomats. During parliamentary sessions, non-resident members of the Senate of Spain and the Congress of Deputies were granted access.

In the 19th century, the club employed a large domestic staff, with approximately one servant per 30 members in 1837 and one per 13 by 1860. Women were admitted as full members for the first time in 1987; previously, their access was limited to certain areas when accompanied. Corporate membership was later introduced, allowing legal entities to appoint representatives. The institution was modelled on British gentlemen’s clubs such as Boodle's and Brooks's. Its membership historically consisted mainly of figures from finance, politics, the military, journalism and law, forming influential elite social networks in Madrid.
