= Bise (disambiguation) =

The bise is a northern wind in France and Switzerland.

Bise or BISE may also refer to:

== Places ==
- Lake Bise, France
- Bise (crater), a crater on Mars
- Bise, Okinawa, a village in Japan
- Cape Bise, a geographic feature on the Motobu Peninsula, Okinawa, Japan

== People with the surname ==
- Marguerite Bise, French chef

== Other uses ==
- Board of Intermediate and Secondary Education (disambiguation), multiple bodies
- Bodies in the space environment, a project on the International Space Station
- Business & Information Systems Engineering, a German journal Wirtschaftsinformatik
- "La Bise", the French name for cheek kissing
- La Bise (restaurant), a defunct French restaurant in Washington, D.C.

== See also ==
- Cornettes de Bise
