= Le Fournil =

French bakery and restaurant in Seattle, Washington, U.S.

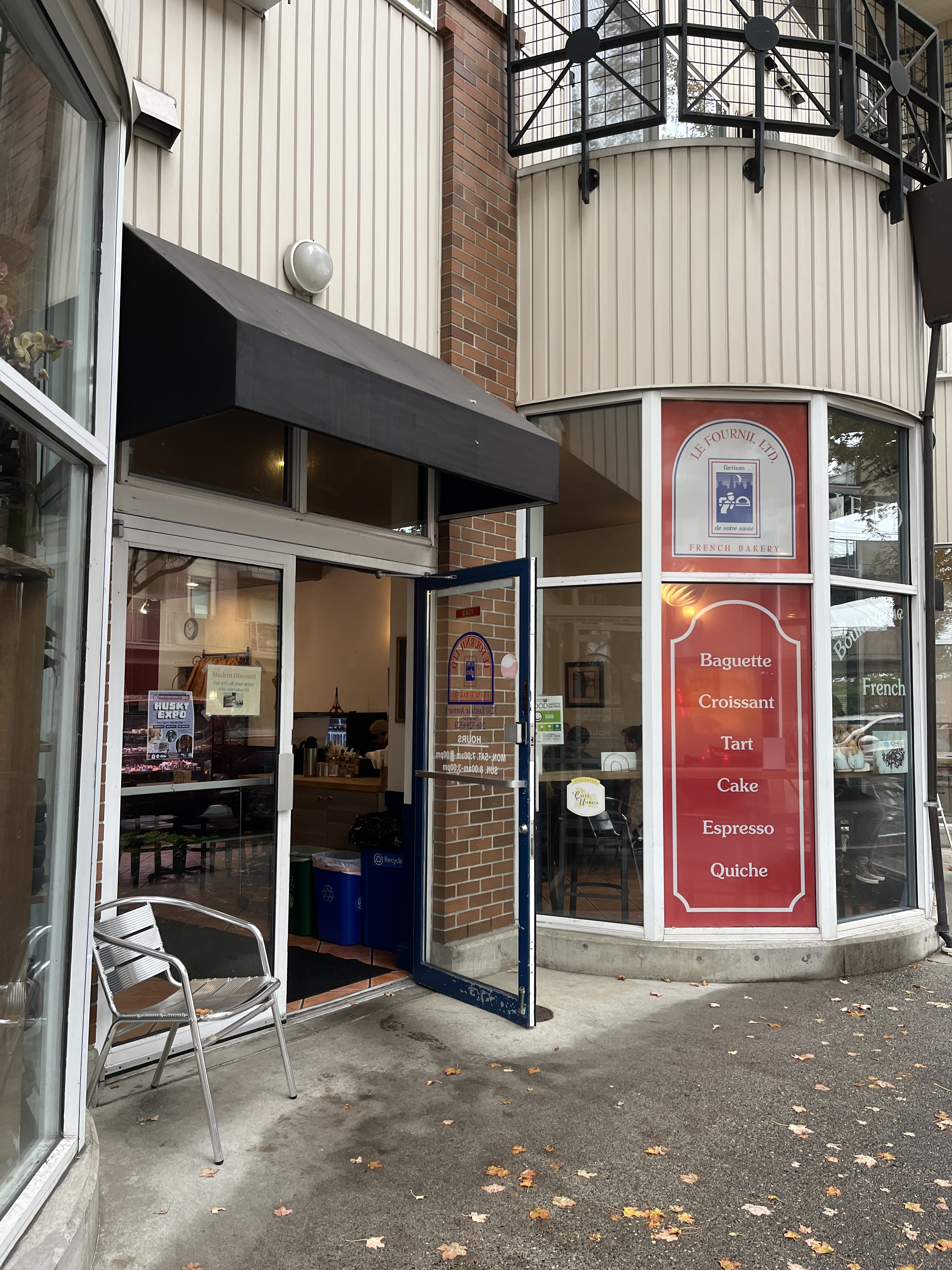
- The bakery's exterior in 2024
- Interactive map of Le Fournil

Restaurant information
- Established: 1997
- Owner: Nicolas Paré
- Food type: French
- Location: 3230 Eastlake Avenue E Suite A, Seattle, King, Washington, 98102
- Coordinates: 47.6508°N 122.3215°W

Le Fournil is a French bakery and restaurant in Seattle, in the U.S. state of Washington. It opened in 1997.

== Description ==
The French bakery and cafe Le Fournil operates in Seattle's Eastlake / Portage Bay area, near Lake Union. The menu includes baguettes and other French breads, as well as cakes, cookies, croissants, quiches, salads, sandwiches, tarts, and other baked goods and desserts. During the holiday season, Le Fournil offers sponge cake-and-ganache bûche de Noël.

== History ==
The bakery opened in 1997. French-born Nicolas Paré is the owner.

Le Fournil has supplied Whole Foods Market, as well as local establishments Café Allegro and Volunteer Park Cafe & Pantry.

== Reception ==
Lara Douglass recommended the business in Eater Seattle's 2016 overview of the city's "outstanding" egg sandwiches. Rosin Saez included Le Fournil in Seattle Metropolitan's list of seventeen "superb" international bakeries in the metropolitan area.

== See also ==
- List of bakeries
- List of French restaurants
