= Bastide (restaurant) =

Defunct restaurant in West Hollywood, California, U.S.

- Interactive map of Bastide

Restaurant information
- Food type: French
- Location: 8475 Melrose Place, California, 90069, United States
- Coordinates: 34°5′1.5″N 118°22′33″W

Bastide was a Michelin-starred French restaurant in West Hollywood, California. The restaurant closed in 2011.

== See also ==
- List of defunct restaurants of the United States
- List of French restaurants
- List of Michelin-starred restaurants in California
