= MaMou (restaurant) =

Restaurant in New Orleans, Louisiana, U.S.

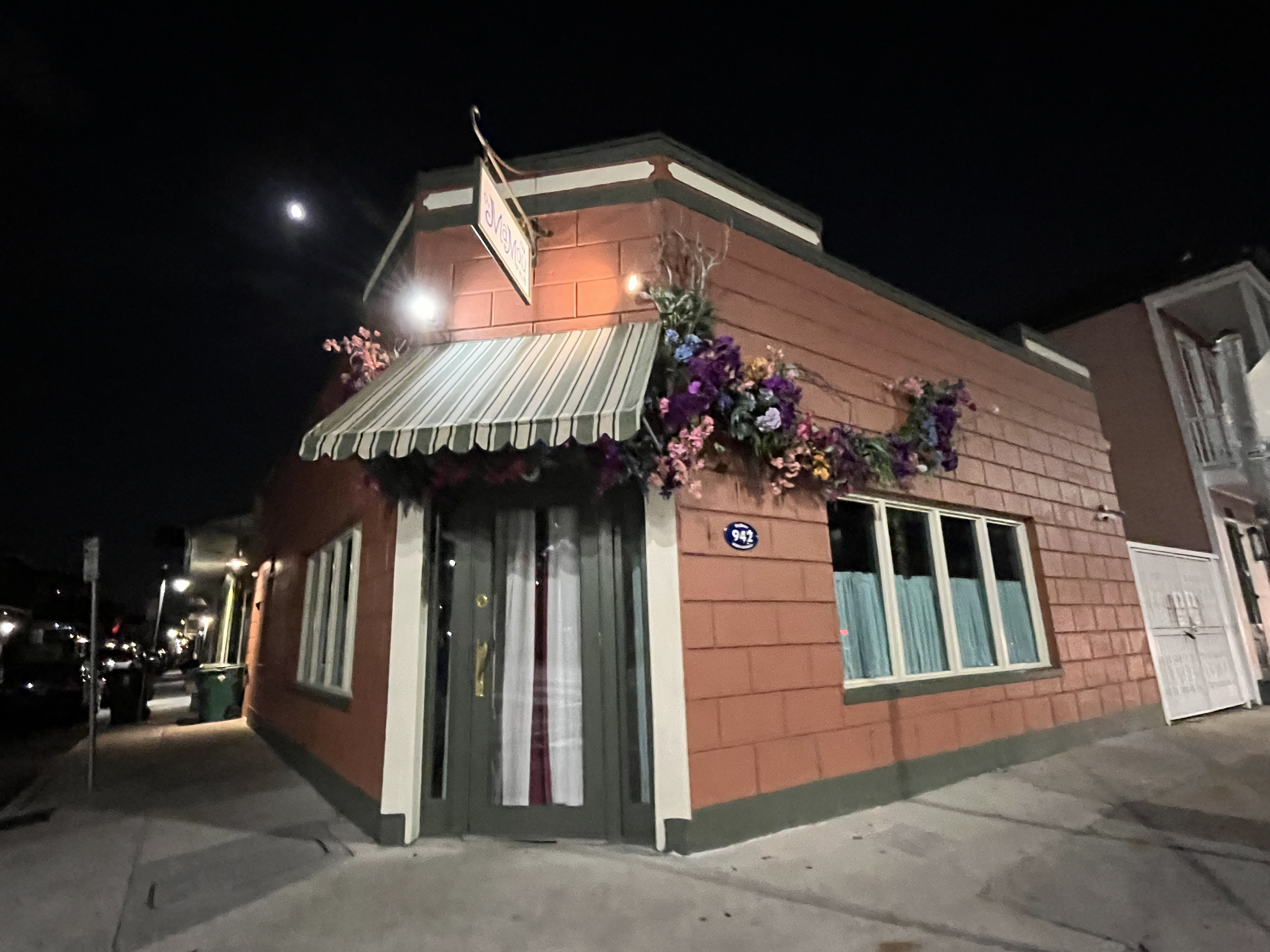
- The restaurant's exterior at night, 2023
- Interactive map of MaMou

Restaurant information
- Food type: French
- Location: 942 North Rampart Street, New Orleans, Louisiana, 70116, United States
- Coordinates: 29°57′46″N 90°3′58″W

MaMou is a French restaurant in New Orleans, Louisiana. Established in November 2022, the business was included in The New York Times's 2023 list of the 50 best restaurants in the United States.

== See also ==
- List of French restaurants
