= Verjus (restaurant) =

French restaurant in San Francisco, California, U.S.

- Interactive map of Verjus

Restaurant information
- Food type: French
- Location: 550 Washington Street, San Francisco, California, United States
- Coordinates: 37°47′45″N 122°24′10″W

Verjus is a French restaurant in San Francisco, California, United States. It was included in The New York Times's 2025 list of the nation's fifty best restaurants.

== See also ==
- List of French restaurants
