= Taix (restaurant) =

French restaurant in Los Angeles, California, U.S.

- Interactive map of Taix

Restaurant information
- Established: 1927
- Closed: March 29, 2026
- Food type: French
- Location: 1911 Sunset Blvd., Los Angeles, California, 90026, United States
- Coordinates: 34.0782°N 118.2614°W
- Website: taixfrench.com

Taix (formerly Les Freres Taix) was a French restaurant in Los Angeles, California, founded in 1927. The restaurant complex, located at 1911 Sunset Boulevard in the city's Echo Park neighborhood, featured open and private dining rooms, banquet halls, and a cocktail lounge with live music called the 321 Lounge. The restaurant closed on March 29, 2026, and is slated to re-open in 2029 following redevelopment of the property.

== History ==
The Taix family came to Los Angeles from the Hautes-Alpes region of France in 1870 and opened a hotel in downtown Los Angeles. French immigrants represented 20% of the city's population in the middle of the 19th century, and the neighborhood that is today's Chinatown was home to a French hospital, French theater, and weekly French-language newspaper. Owners Marius Taix, Marius Taix, Jr., and Louis Larquier ran the casual restaurant with French country meals served at long communal tables. The brick building had a tin ceiling, hanging chandeliers, and dark wood floors. Owing to its location in the civic center, the restaurant was popular with government workers and reporters from the Los Angeles Times, and held a special table reserved for staff. When the restaurant was demolished, the Los Angeles Times noted that its patrons “included the celebrated and the notorious of Los Angeles civic life.”

The building at 321 Commercial Street near Union Station had originally housed a pharmacy belonging to Marius Taix, and during prohibition the restaurant served “medicinal” wine to city officials and other select customers in a private dining room. The original Taix closed in 1964 when it was purchased by the city of Los Angeles and replaced with a parking structure.

Two years before the closure, Marius Taix Jr. and Louis Larquier opened a new Taix in the Echo Park neighborhood of Los Angeles. The New York Times described the architecture of the restaurant as “Los Angeles chalet.” Food critic Lois Dwan described the fare in 1970 as “bountiful portions of simply prepared foods at moderate prices.” Taix is a destination for baseball fans before or after a game at nearby Dodger Stadium. The 321 Lounge is named for the restaurant's original address at 321 Commercial Street in Los Angeles.

Fourth-generation owner Michael Taix sold the restaurant to real estate developers in 2019 who plan to replace it with a multi-story apartment building. In October 2020, the Los Angeles Cultural Heritage Commission began discussions on the designation of the Taix building as a Los Angeles Historic-Cultural Monument. In 2021 it was decided the building would not be a monument, but rather the property and restaurant features, thereby allowing the demolition and redevelopment to proceed.

== See also ==
- List of French restaurants

== Bibliography ==
- Geary, George (2016). L.A.'s Legendary Restaurants. Santa Monica Press. ISBN 9781595800893.
- Greenwood, Roberta (1996). Down by the Station: Los Angeles Chinatown, 1880-1933. Cotsen Institute of Archaeology Press. ISBN 978-0-917956-87-4.
- Bauer, Linda (2016). Recipes from Historic California A Restaurant Guide and Cookbook. Taylor Trade Publishing. ISBN 978-1589793484.
