= Bistro Jeanty =

Restaurant in Yountville, California, U.S.

- Interactive map of Bistro Jeanty

Restaurant information
- Owner: Philippe Jeanty
- Chef: Philippe Jeanty
- Food type: French
- Location: 6510 Washington Street, Yountville, Napa, California, 94599, United States
- Coordinates: 38°24′3.7″N 122°21′35.5″W
- Website: bistrojeanty.com

Bistro Jeanty is a French bistro in Yountville, California, United States. The restaurant has previously received a Michelin star.

== Description ==
The exterior of Bistro Jeanty contains red-and-white awnings, flower boxes, and "extra-wide" shutters.

Bistro Jeanty is a French bistro. Its menu consists of tomato soup in a bread bowl, mussels and French fries, along with cassoulet, steak au poivre, and escargots. Coq au vin is also served. Desserts include a crème brûlée with chocolate, as well as Crêpes Suzette with orange butter.

== Reception ==
Andrew Steinthal of The Infatuation described Bistro Jeanty as an "all-purpose spot". The sole meunière received some criticism for having "muddy and tired" flavors.

The restaurant had received a Michelin star from 2007 until 2009.

== See also ==
- List of French restaurants
- List of Michelin-starred restaurants in California
