= Apéro (restaurant) =

French restaurant in Washington, D.C., U.S.

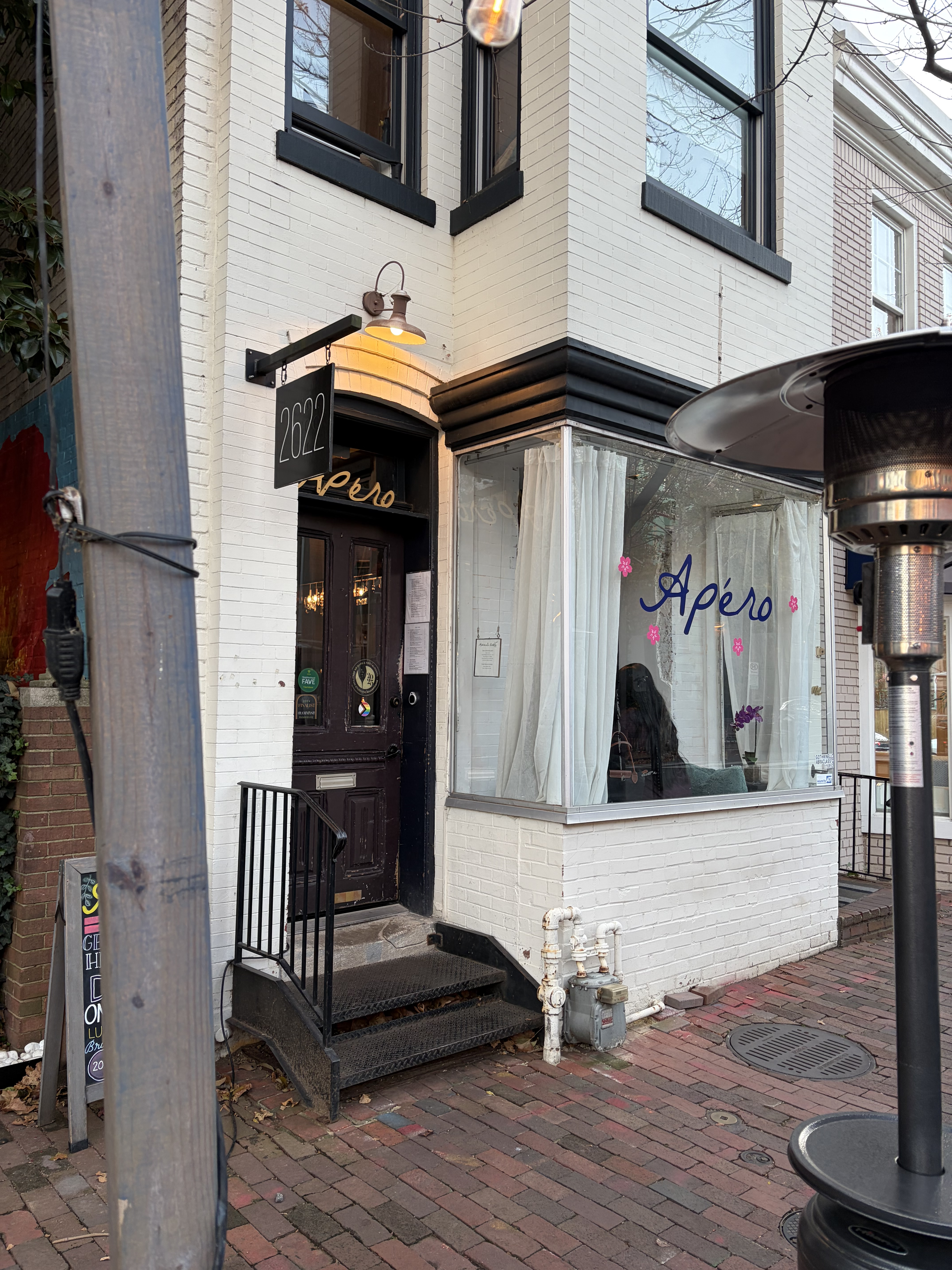
- The restaurant's exterior in 2025
- Interactive map of Apéro

Restaurant information
- Established: May 19, 2021
- Owner: Elli Benchimol
- Food type: French
- Location: 2622 P Street NW, Washington, D.C., 20007, United States
- Coordinates: 38°54′33.2″N 77°3′19.8″W
- Website: www.aperodc.com

Apéro is a French restaurant in Georgetown, Washington, D.C.

== History ==
Apéro opened on May 19, 2021. Elli Benchimol is the owner and sommelier.

== Reception ==
Tim Ebner included Apéro in Thrillist's 2022 list of Georgetown's best restaurants. Austa Somvichian-Clausen included the business in the website's 2023 list of 16 romantic restaurants in Washington, D.C., "for a perfect date night".

== See also ==
- List of French restaurants
