= Brandon Lee (pornographic film actor) =

American pornographic actor

- DVD cover of The Best of Brandon Lee (Note: Brandon Lee is the only Asian American porn actor to have a "best of" video compilation. (Nguyen 2014, p. 32)) (1999) by Catalina
- Born: Jon Enriquez; March 18, 1979 (age 47); United States
- Other name: Sean Martinez
- Occupations: Porn actor; Navy plane mechanic; chef
- Height: 5 ft 7 in (1.70 m)

Brandon Lee (born Jon Enriquez; March 18, 1979) is a Filipino-American former gay pornographic film actor. He is regarded as the first gay Asian porn star, the first famous Asian top, and arguably the most popular Asian pornographic actor in contemporary gay male culture.

== Pornography career ==
Lee started in the industry in 1997 at the age of 18 after being discovered by adult film director Chi Chi Larue at a bathhouse. He chose the name of actor Brandon Lee as his porn name. His first movies were under Catalina Video for the Asian niche market but he crossed over into mainstream gay pornography by 1998. He worked as a top which was unusual at that time for an Asian actor in US or European gay pornography. One of the most famous interracial movie in 1998 was Fortune Nookie, directed by Chi Chi Larue, with Niko Thai, Erik Tenaka, Tishiro Ho.

An analysis of Lee's work, and his place in the gay pornography industry, written by Nguyen Tan Hoang (Nguyễn Tấn Hoàng), appeared in the book Porn Studies (Linda Williams, Duke University Press). According to Richard Fung, Asian men were usually portrayed asexually in Western culture, and Nguyen argued that Lee's position in gay pornography challenged these stereotypes. The essay is entitled "The Resurrection of Brandon Lee: The Making of a Gay Asian-American Porn Star."

After starring in seven porn videos for Catalina from 1997 to 1998, Lee took a hiatus. He made his comeback as a Rascal Video Exclusive in 2004, and in Chi Chi Larue's Wicked (2005), bottomed for the first time on screen. Nguyen has published another essay analyzing Lee's porn career, titled "The Rise, and Fall, of a Gay Asian American Porn Star", in his book A View from the Bottom: Asian American Masculinity and Sexual Representation.

Lee was awarded the "Wall of Fame" award at the 2015 Grabby Awards in Chicago, IL. Matthew Rettenmund included Lee in his 2019 list of "History's 250 Greatest Gay-Porn Stars" on Boyculture.com at #39.

== Other careers ==
Lee joined the U.S. Navy in 1998, while he was still active in porn, and served till 2003. He studied at Embry-Riddle Aeronautical University in Arizona to become a plane mechanic. He did a tour of Iraq, where he repaired jet cockpits for the Navy.

In 2003, he graduated from Le Cordon Bleu in pastry and savory programs, and worked for Princess Cruises, eventually becoming the executive chef at the Michelin-starred restaurant Ortolan in Los Angeles.

He relocated to San Francisco in 2010, and started a catering business.

Lee is also a musician, and has scored four porn films. He has done theatre as well; and in 2006, he played the role of Takeshi Kawabata in Nearly Naked Theatre’s production of Take Me Out.

== Personal life ==
Lee was born in Mobile, Alabama. His father was a Coast Guard cook, who later worked for a commercial food and beverage company. He is Filipino by ethnicity.

== See also ==
- List of pornographic performers by decade
