= Ortolan (restaurant) =

Defunct French restaurant in Los Angeles, California, U.S.

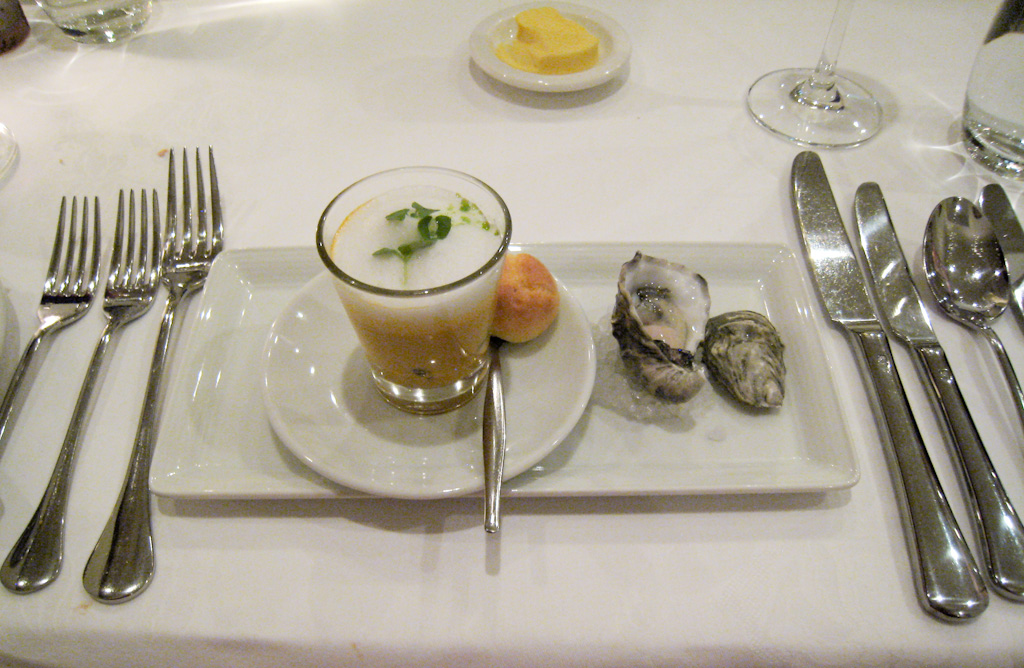
- Amuse plating at Ortolan (2009).
- Interactive map of Ortolan

Restaurant information
- Established: 2005; 21 years ago
- Closed: 2011; 15 years ago
- Food type: French
- Rating: (Michelin Guide)
- Location: 8338 West 3rd Street, Los Angeles, California, 90048, United States
- Coordinates: 34°4′21.5″N 118°22′17″W

Ortolan was a Michelin-starred French restaurant in Los Angeles, California, United States. The fine dining establishment opened in 2005 and closed in 2011.

French chef Christophe Émé opened it in partnership with actress Jeri Ryan, with whom he was in a relationship at that time and later got married.

Former gay porn star Brandon Lee used to be executive chef at Ortolan.

== See also ==
- List of defunct restaurants of the United States
- List of French restaurants
- List of Michelin-starred restaurants in California
