= Heavenly Creatures (restaurant) =

Wine bar and bottle shop in Portland, Oregon, U.S.

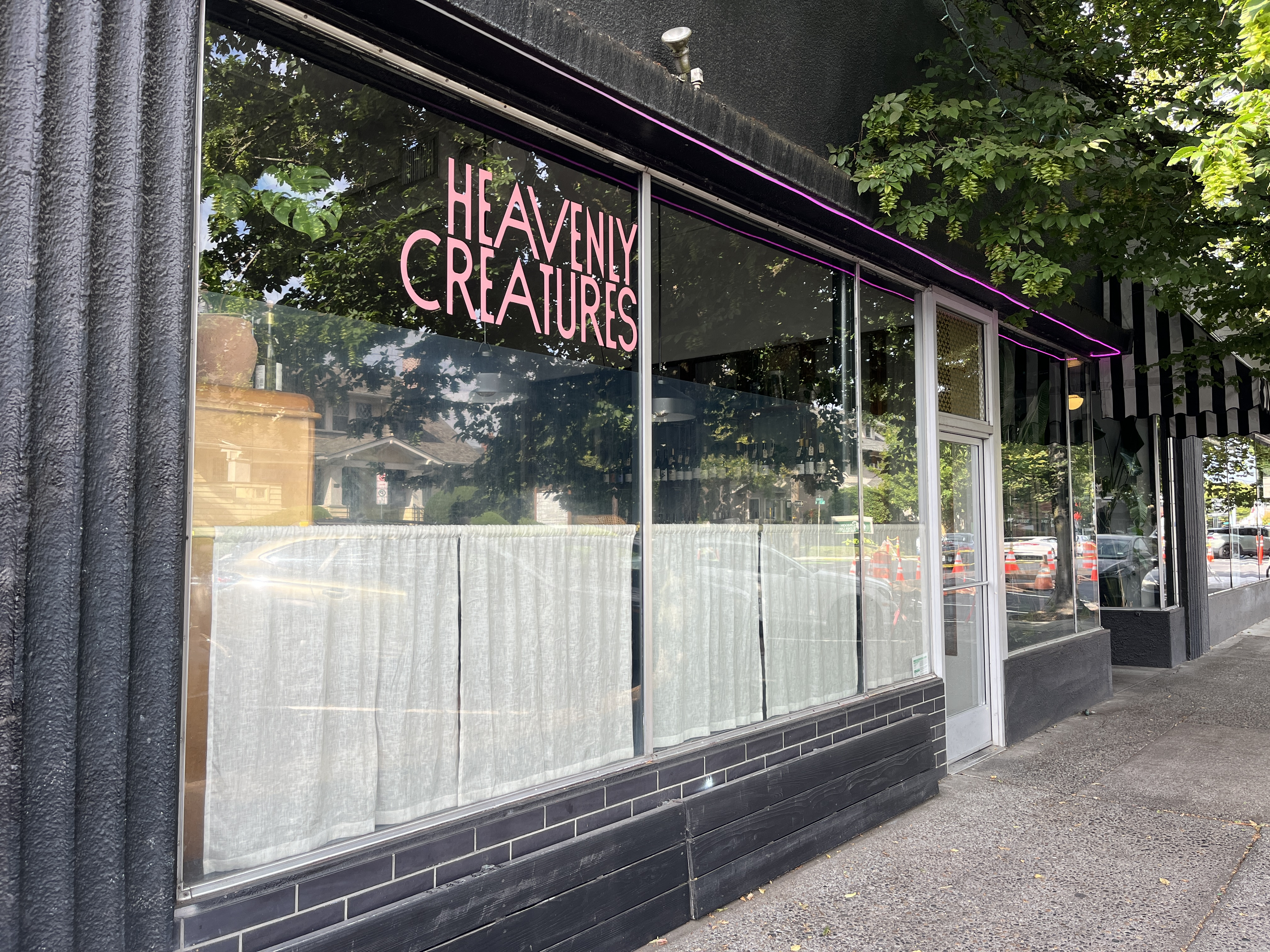
- The restaurant's exterior, 2025
- Interactive map of Heavenly Creatures

Restaurant information
- Established: 2022
- Food type: French
- Location: 2218 Northeast Broadway, Portland, Multnomah, Oregon, 97232, United States
- Coordinates: 45.5348°N 122.6426°W
- Website: heavenlycreaturespdx.com

Heavenly Creatures is a wine bar and bottle shop in Portland, Oregon, United States. The restaurant opened in the Sullivan's Gulch neighborhood of northeast Portland in 2022. It has garnered a positive reception and was named one of Portland's ten best new restaurants by The Oregonian in 2023.

== Description ==
The French wine bar and bottle shop Heavenly Creatures, which is named after the 1994 film of the same name, operates on Broadway, in event space affiliated with Coopers Hall Winery and Taproom in the Sullivan's Gulch neighborhood of northeast Portland. According to Eater Portland, the inside of Heavenly Creatures is "meant to feel cozy and lightly midcentury, with coral-pink-and-white-speckled tables and a curved bar". Brooke Jackson-Glidden wrote, "The space is tight, light low, giving evenings here both the relaxed air of European wine bars and anticipatory buzz of an evening of small delights."

The interior has walls lined with bottles, and the food menu includes schmaltz beignets, shrimp in lobster oil, yellowtail toast, and soft cheeses served alongside potato chips. The restaurant has also served grilled Iberico pork with anchovy and lavender, as well as smoked mussel tonnato. Heavenly Creatures has a seating capacity of approximately 20 people, and stocks approximately 120 to 150 types of wine from various regions.

== History ==
Inspired by the natural wine bars of Barcelona, sommelier Joel Gunderson and chef Aaron Barnett opened Heavenly Creatures on October 26, 2022, in the space previously occupied by Nightwood Society.

== Reception ==
Heavenly Creatures won in the Best New Bar category of Eater Portland's Eater Awards in 2022. In the website's 2022 overview of "where to drink wine in Portland right now", Alex Frane and Zoe Baillargeon called the bar "classy" and "elegant". The website's Jackson-Glidden wrote in 2024: "Heavenly Creatures on Broadway is so sweet and pretty; its bar is lined with flowers and candles, and the whole space has this sort of bistro energy I love. Yes, it's a wine bar, but the food is fantastic and super snack-y — definitely get the whipped Camembert and the yellowtail toast, and maybe one other plate."

Heavenly Creatures ranked tenth in The Oregonian's 2023 overview of Portland's best new restaurants. Matthew Trueherz of Portland Monthly called the business "an example of a restaurant whose food, in theory, plays sidekick to the vino". In 2024, the magazine included Heavenly Creatures in a list of the city's 50 best restaurants, and Bon Appétit said, "While wine is undoubtedly the focus, the chefs are doing remarkable work." The business ranked number 12 in Resy's 2025 list of the nation's top 100 dining destinations.

== See also ==
- List of French restaurants
