= Benno (restaurant) =

Defunct restaurant in New York City

- Interactive map of Benno

Restaurant information
- Established: November 8, 2018
- Closed: December 15, 2021
- Location: 7 East 27th Street, New York City, New York, 10016, United States
- Coordinates: 40°44′38″N 73°59′13.2″W

Benno was a restaurant in New York City, in the U.S. state of New York. The fine dining establishment served French, Italian, and Mediterranean cuisine.

== See also ==
- List of defunct restaurants of the United States
- List of French restaurants
- List of Italian restaurants
- List of Michelin-starred restaurants in New York City
