= Frevo (restaurant) =

Restaurant in New York City

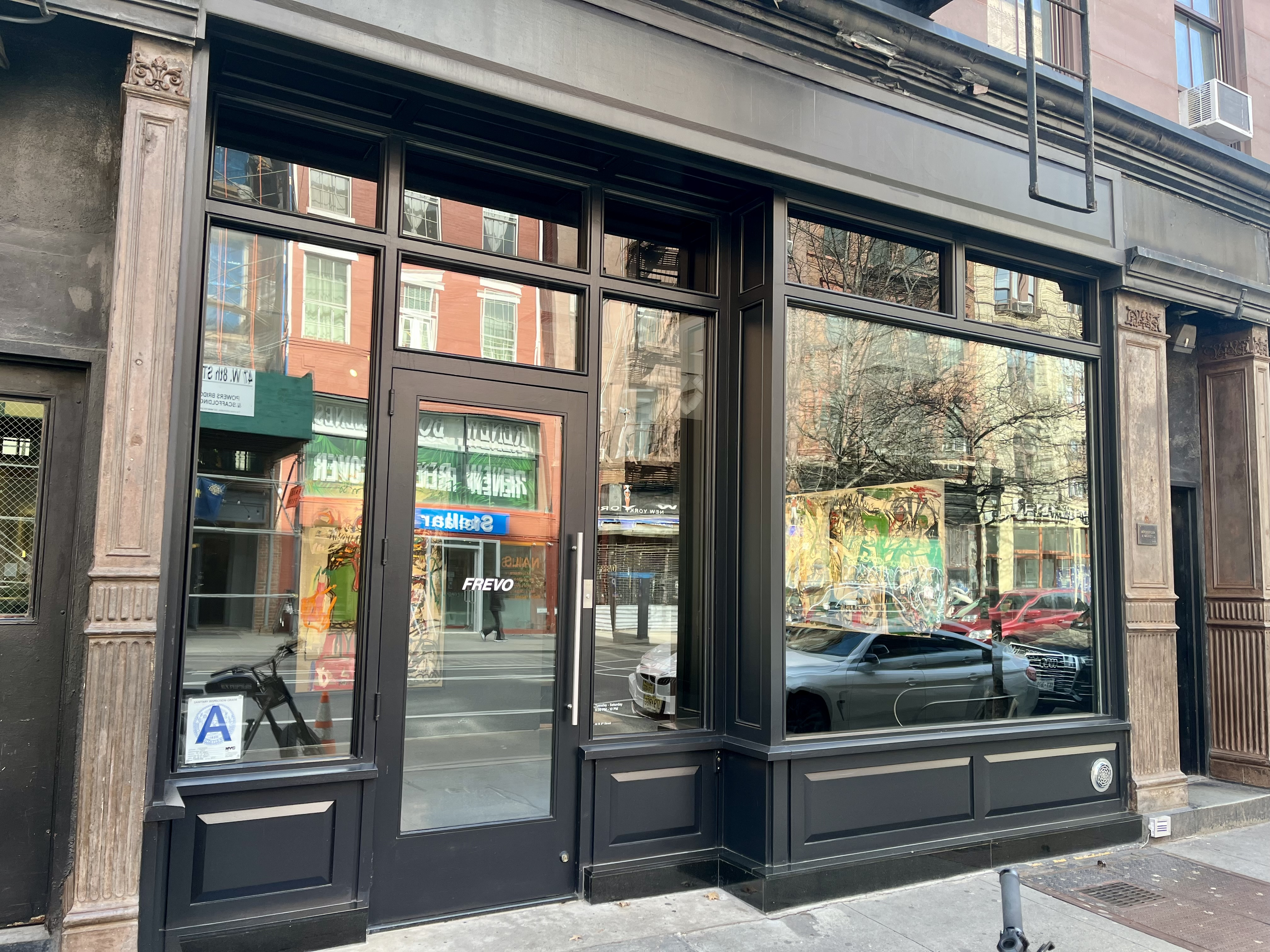
- Frevo in March 2024
- Interactive map of Frevo

Restaurant information
- Established: May 2019
- Owner: Bernardo Silva
- Head chef: Franco Sampogna
- Food type: International
- Rating: Michelin Guide
- Location: 48 West 8th Street, New York City, New York, 10011, United States
- Coordinates: 40°43′59.3″N 73°59′55.3″W
- Seating capacity: 16-seat counter
- Reservations: Reservations only
- Other information: Tok Reservations
- Website: https://frevonyc.com/

Frevo is a restaurant in the Greenwich Village neighborhood of New York City. The seasonal French tasting menu consisting of 10 courses is located hidden behind an art gallery. The restaurant was awarded a Michelin star in 2022.

== See also ==
- List of French restaurants
- List of Michelin-starred restaurants in New York City
