= List of French restaurants =

This is a list of notable French restaurants. French cuisine consists of cooking traditions and practices from France, famous for the rich tastes and subtle nuances with long and rich history. France, a country famous for its agriculture and independently minded peasants, was long a creative powerbase for delicious recipes, that are both healthy and refined. Knowledge of French cooking has contributed significantly to Western cuisines and its criteria are used widely in Western cookery school boards and culinary education. In November 2010, French gastronomy was added by the UNESCO to its lists of the world's "intangible cultural heritage".

== Notable French restaurants ==
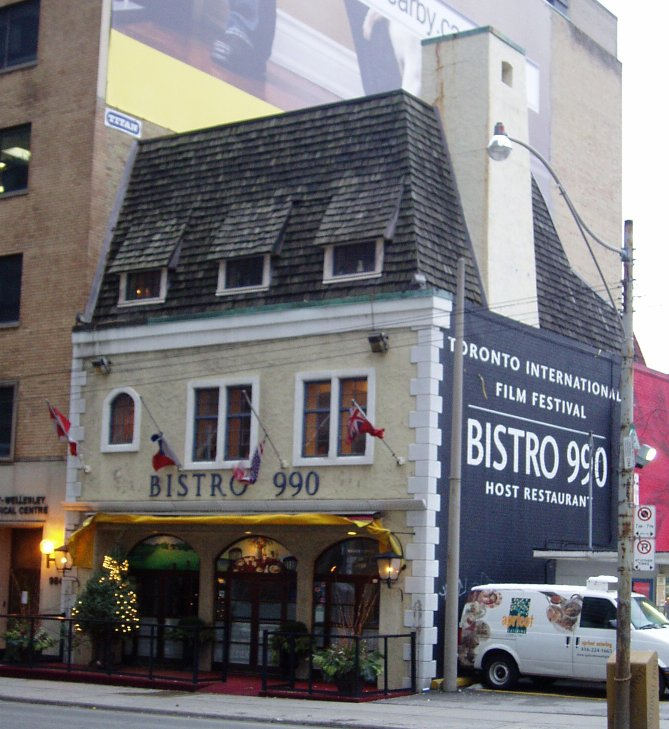
Bistro 990, Toronto, Ontario

- Alain Ducasse at the Dorchester, London
- Alo, Toronto
- Alobar Yorkville, Toronto
- Les Amis, Singapore
- Arpège, Paris, France
- L'Atelier de Joël Robuchon
  - L'Atelier de Joël Robuchon (London)
  - L'Atelier de Joël Robuchon (Tokyo)
- Aubergine, London
- Bagatelle, Oslo, Norway
- Berowra Waters Inn, New South Wales, Australia
- Bistro 990, Toronto, Ontario, Canada
- Café des Artistes, Puerto Vallarta, Mexico
- Café Rouge, United Kingdom
- Café Royal, London
- Caprice, Hong Kong
- Chauncy, Heathcote, Victoria, Australia
- Chez Bruce, London
- Chez Dominique, Helsinki, Finland
- Les Créations de Narisawa, Tokyo, Japan
- L'Escargot, London
- La Ferme de Mon Père, Megeve, France
- Fitzgerald, Rotterdam, Netherlands
- Fouquet's, Paris
- Gaddi's, Hong Kong
- Galvin at Windows, London
- Gary's
- Le Gavroche, London
- Green Tangerine, Hanoi
- Hexagon, Canada
- Lumière, Vancouver, Canada
- Maison Boulud, Singapore
- Maison Novelli, London
- Le Manoir aux Quat' Saisons, Oxford, England
- Maxim's Paris, Paris
- Mr & Mrs Bund, Shanghai, China
- L'Opéra restaurant, Paris
- OD Urla, Ismir, Turkey
- Pied à Terre, London
- Pierre, Hong Kong
- Restaurant André, Singapore
- Restaurant Guy Savoy, Paris
- The Restaurant Marco Pierre White, London
- Rhubarb Le Restaurant, Singapore
- Roussillon, London
- Seinpost, Schevenigen, Netherlands
- Sketch, London
- St. Lawrence, Vancouver, British Columbia
- Sud 777, Mexico City
- La Société, Toronto, Canada
- La Tante Claire, London
- Teruar Urla, Izmir, Turkey
- Tom Aikens, London

=== United States ===
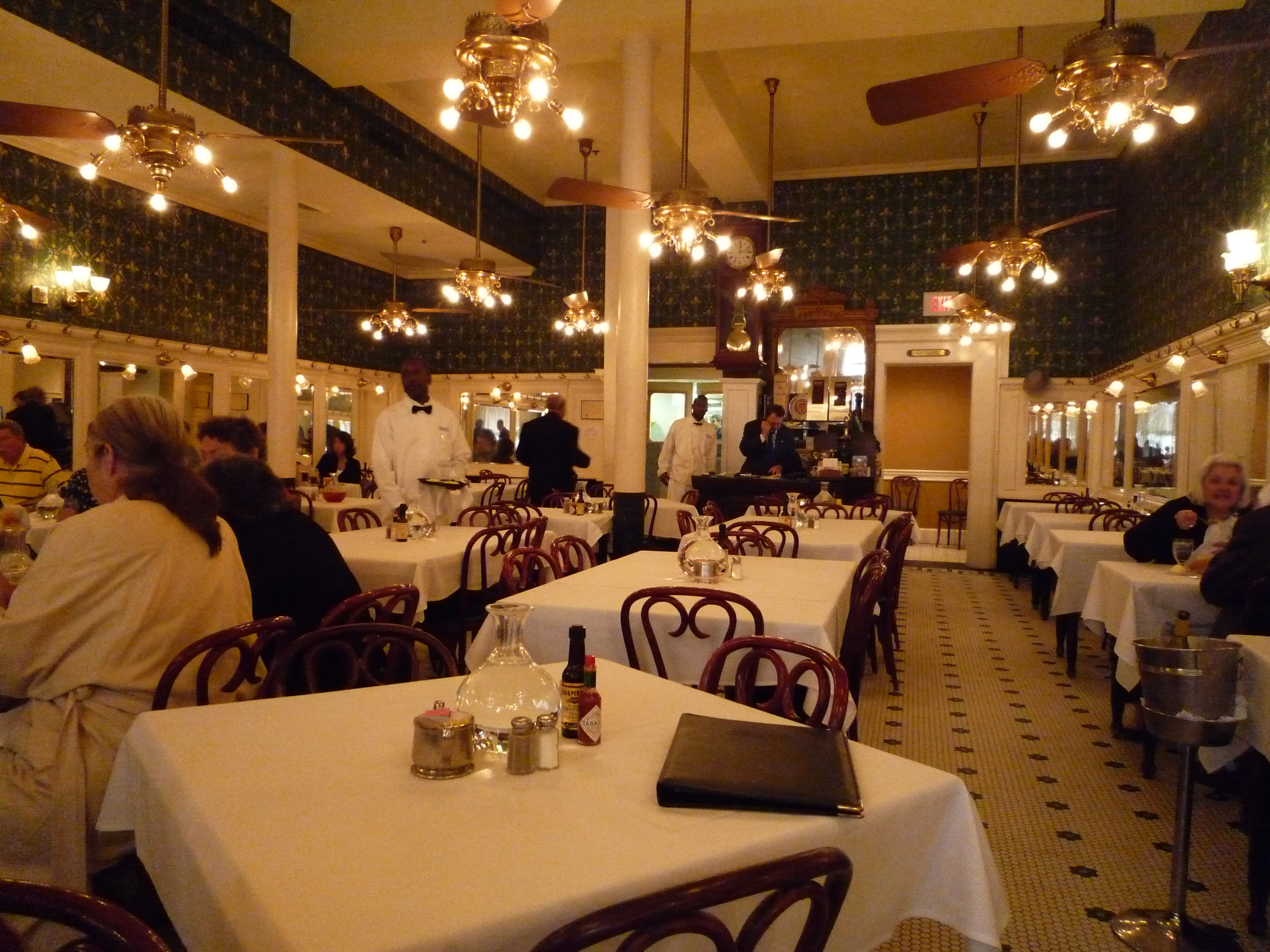
Galatoire's, New Orleans, Louisiana

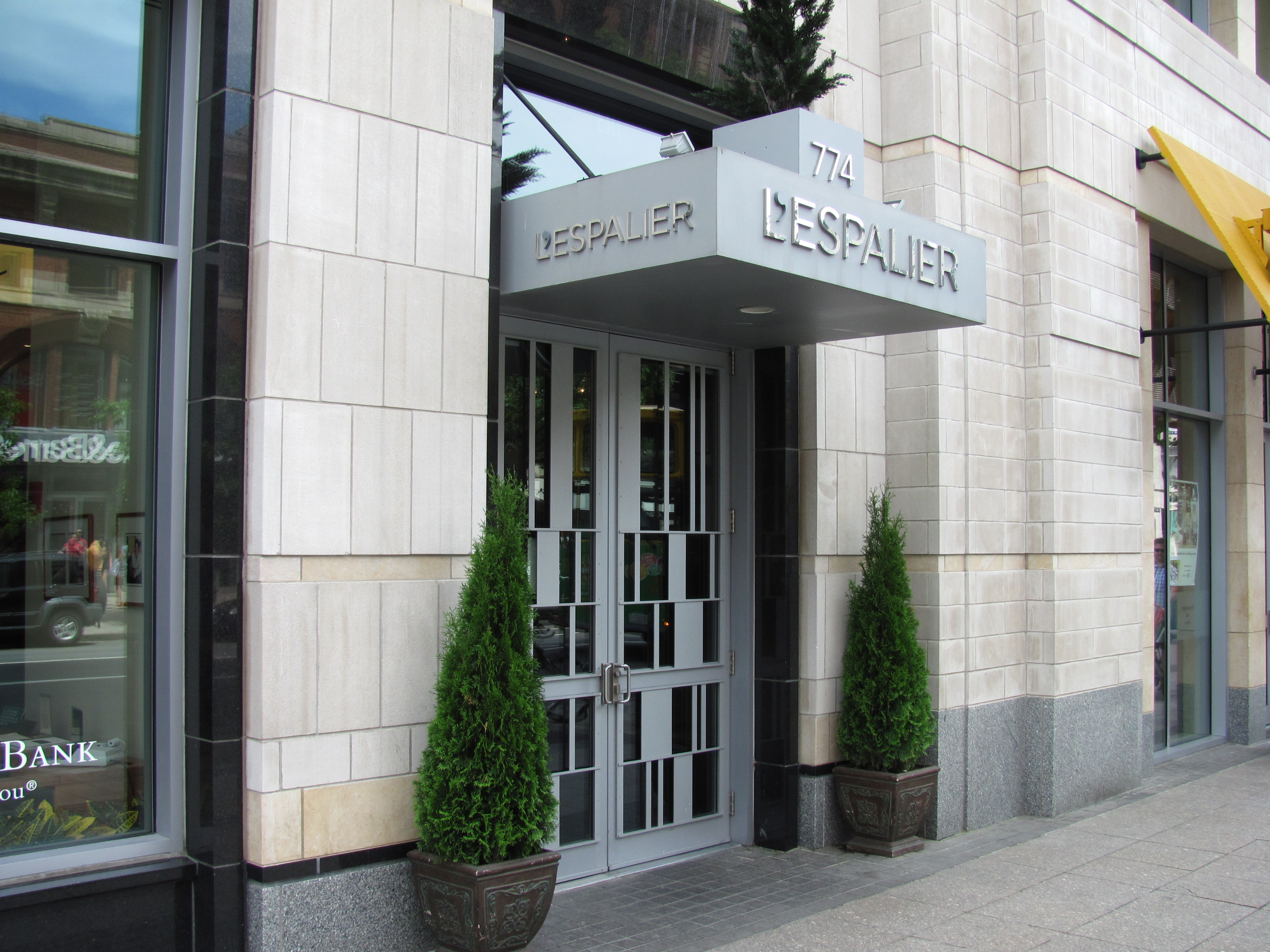
L'Espalier, Boston, Massachusetts

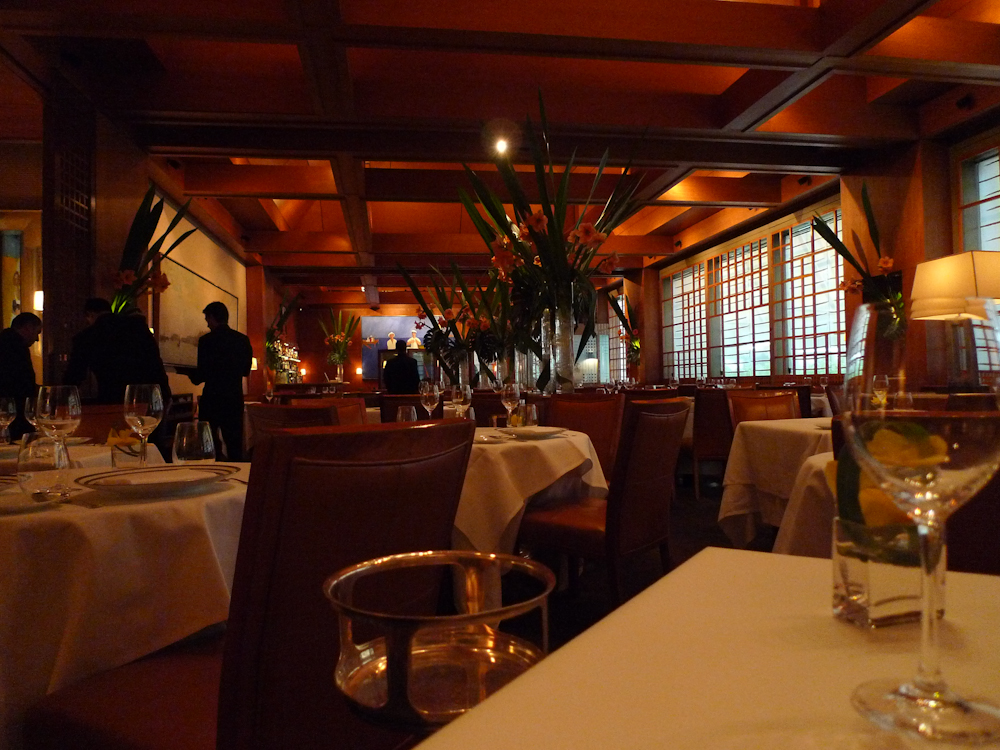
Le Bernardin, New York City

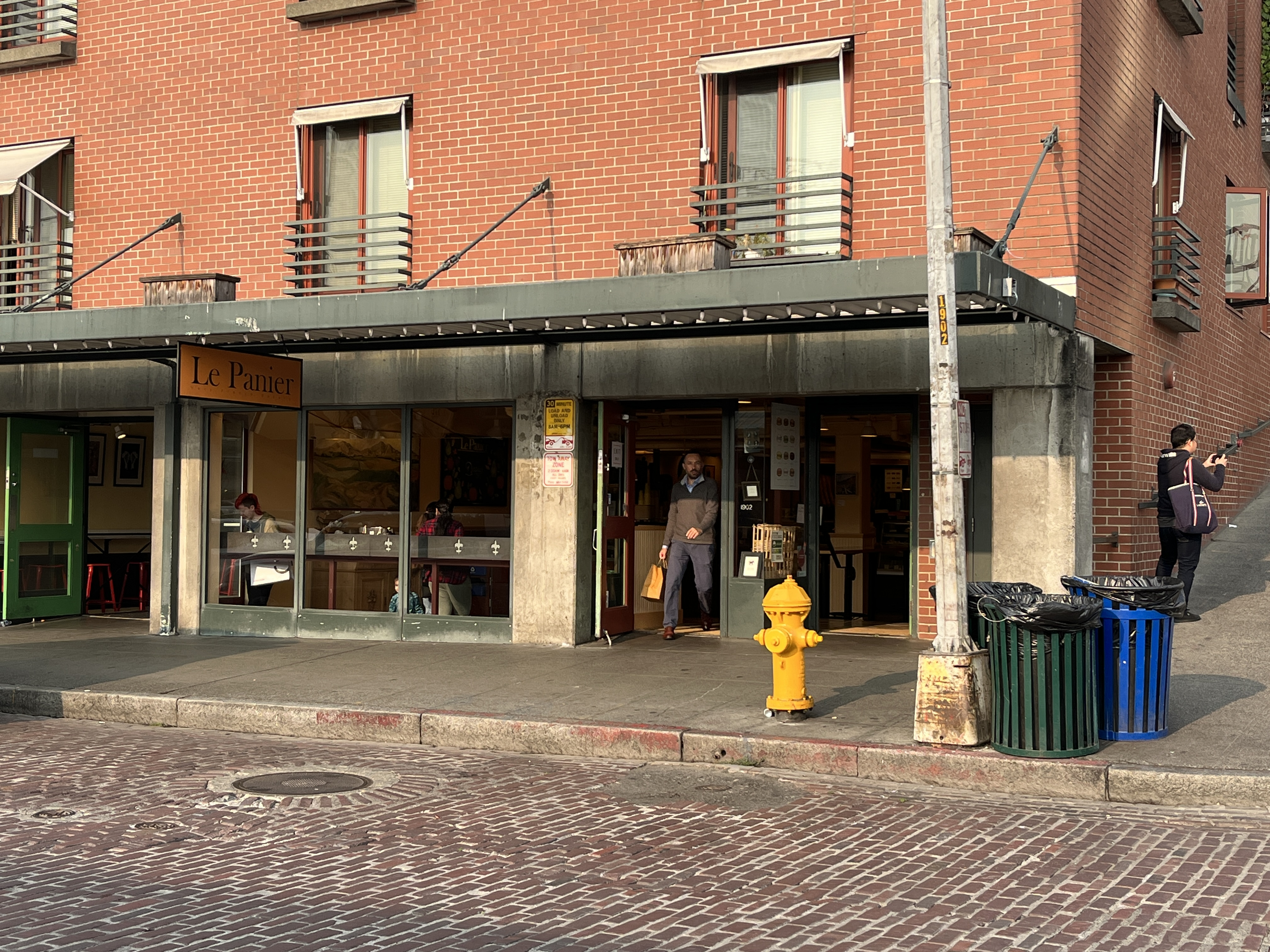
Le Panier, Seattle, Washington

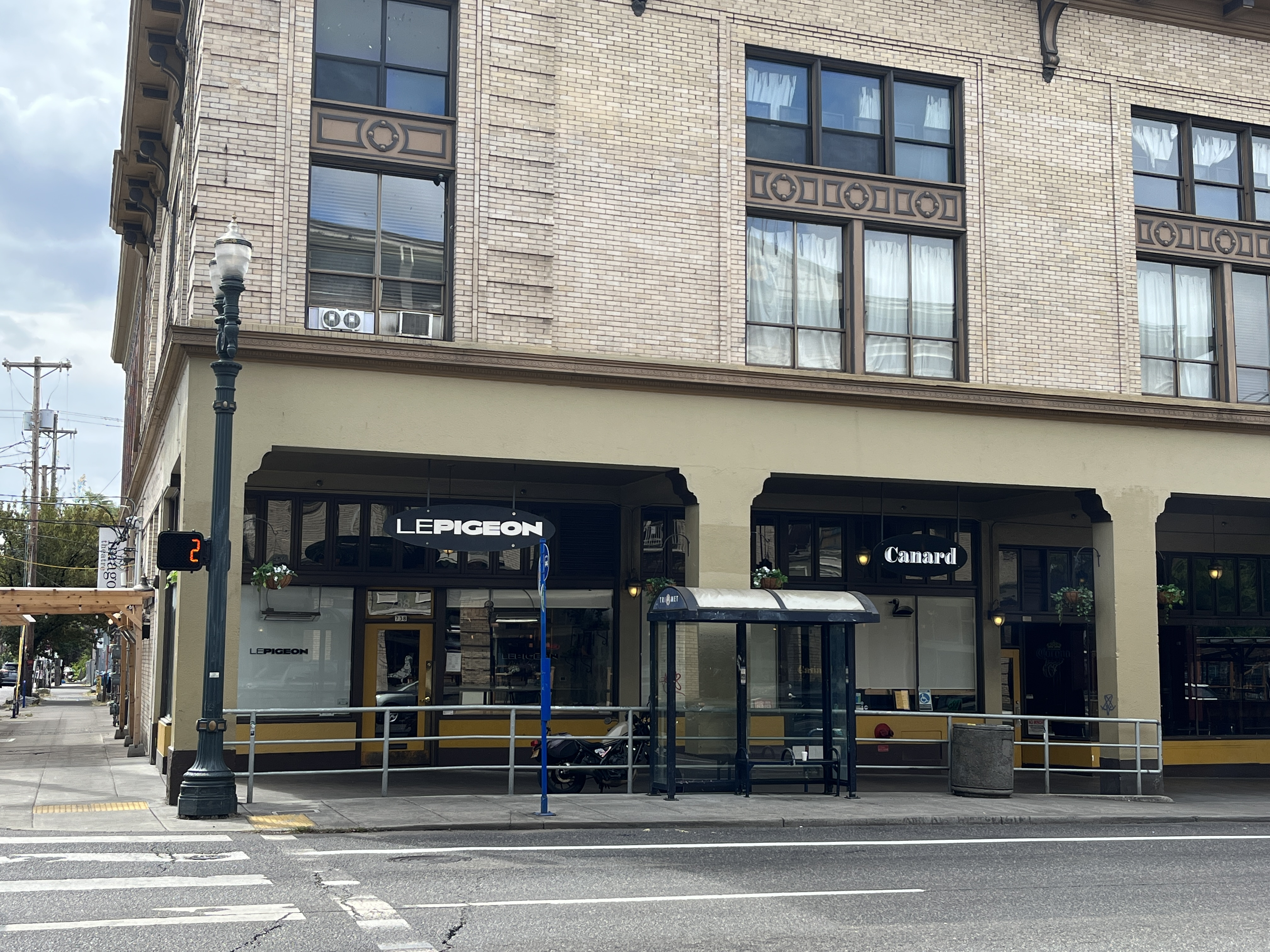
Le Pigeon, Portland, Oregon

Notable French restaurants in the United States include:

- Alex, Las Vegas, Nevada
- An Xuyên Bakery, Portland, Oregon
- Andre's, Las Vegas, Nevada
- Apéro, Washington, D.C.
- Atelier Crenn, San Francisco, California
- Aviary, Portland, Oregon
- L'Atelier de Joël Robuchon, Miami, Florida
- Balthazar, New York City
- Bastide, West Hollywood, California
- La Bastide by Andrea Calstier, New York City
- Baumé, Palo Alto, California
- Beast, Portland, Oregon
- Bell's, Los Alamos, California
- Benno, New York City
- La Bise, Washington, D.C.
- Bistro Agnes, Portland, Oregon
- Bistro Jeanty, Yountville, California
- Bouchon, Yountville, California and Las Vegas, Nevada
- Bouley, New York City
- Brasserie Julien, New York City
- Brasserie Montmartre, Portland, Oregon
- Broussard's, New Orleans
- Camphor, Los Angeles, California
- Café Boulud, New York City
- Cafe Campagne, Seattle, Washington
- Cafe Chambord, New York City
- Café des Artistes, New York City
- Canard, Portland, Oregon
- Chez Machin, Portland, Oregon
- Chez Paul, Chicago, Illinois
- Chez TJ, Mountain View, California
- Citrin, Santa Monica, California
- Coquine, Portland, Oregon
- Corton, New York City
- Daniel, New York City
- L'Échelle, Portland, Oregon
- Elephant Walk, Massachusetts
- Eleven Madison Park, New York City
- Essential by Christophe, New York City
- Everest, Chicago
- Fenouil, Portland, Oregon
- Fleur de Lys, San Francisco, California
- La Folie, San Francisco
- Le Fournil, Seattle
- Frevo, New York City
- Galatoire's, New Orleans, Louisiana
- La Goulue, New York City
- La Grenouille, New York City
- Hamersley's Bistro, Boston
- Heavenly Creatures, Portland, Oregon
- Jean-Georges, New York City
- Jeune et Jolie, Carlsbad, California
- Joël Robuchon, Las Vegas
- Knife Pleat, Costa Mesa, California
- L'Espalier, Boston, Massachusetts
- Le Cirque, Las Vegas, New York City
- Le Happy, Portland, Oregon
- Le Panier, Seattle
- La Parisienne French Bakery, Seattle
- Le Bec-Fin, Philadelphia, Pennsylvania
- Le Bernardin, New York City
- Le Coucou, New York City
- Le Jardinier, New York City
- La Côte Basque, New York City
- Little Bird Bistro, Portland, Oregon
- Locke-Ober, Boston
- Loulay, Seattle
- Lutèce, Las Vegas
- Lutèce, New York City
- La Madeleine, United States
- MaMou, New Orleans
- Marmite, Seattle
- Mas, New York City
- Masa's Wine Bar & Kitchen, San Francisco
- Maurice, Portland, Oregon
- Mélisse, Santa Monica, California
- Mimi's Cafe, United States
- My Loup, Philadelphia
- Nico, San Francisco
- One If By Land, Two If By Sea Restaurant, New York City
- L'Orange, Portland, Oregon
- Ortolan, Los Angeles
- Pasjoli, Santa Monica
- Le Pavillon, New York City
- Le Papillon, San Jose, California
- Per Se, New York City
- Philippe's, Los Angeles
- Le Pichet, Seattle
- La Provence and Petite Provence
- Le Pigeon, Portland, Oregon
- Red Cow, Seattle
- Restaurant Marché, Bainbridge Island, Washington
- Restaurant Yuu, New York City
- RIA, Chicago
- St. Honoré Boulangerie, Portland, Oregon
- St. Jack, Portland, Oregon
- Taix, Los Angeles
- Trois Mec, Hollywood, California
- Tru, Chicago
- Verjus, San Francisco

== See also ==
- Brasserie
- Friterie
- Haute cuisine
- L'Entrecôte
- List of French cheeses
- List of French desserts
- List of French dishes
- Lists of restaurants
- Pâtisserie
