= Chez Paul =

- Interactive map of Chez Paul

Restaurant information
- Established: 1945
- Closed: 1995
- Previous owner: Paul Contos
- Coordinates: 41°53′40.07″N 87°37′31.11″W

Chez Paul was a French restaurant in Chicago, Illinois. Established in 1945 by Paul Contos, Chez Paul became famous under Paul's son, Bill. It was the oldest French restaurant in Chicago, and was only exceeded in prestige by Le Francais. Both restaurants have closed.

Bill Contos died in April 1993, and though the restaurant was struggling, his wife, Regina kept it open for a few more years, long enough to see its 50th anniversary.

Paul Contos opened Chez Paul at Delaware Avenue off Michigan Avenue, but moved it into the Robert Hall McCormick II mansion in 1964 at 660 North Rush Street, after refurbishing the building. The steps and pillars are marble, as is the mantel in the Louis Room, which was presented to McCormick when he was ambassador to Italy by Victor Emannuel III, King of Italy.

A replica of the restaurant's interior was used for a scene in the 1980 film The Blues Brothers. Bill Contos said of the replica, "It was either that or ship the McCormick mansion to the West Coast, and this just seemed easier." A similar set was used in the 1986 movie Ferris Bueller's Day Off.

Chez Paul closed in 1995, and the building is currently used for office space.

== See also ==
- List of French restaurants
