= St. Honoré Boulangerie =

Bakery in the U.S. state of Oregon

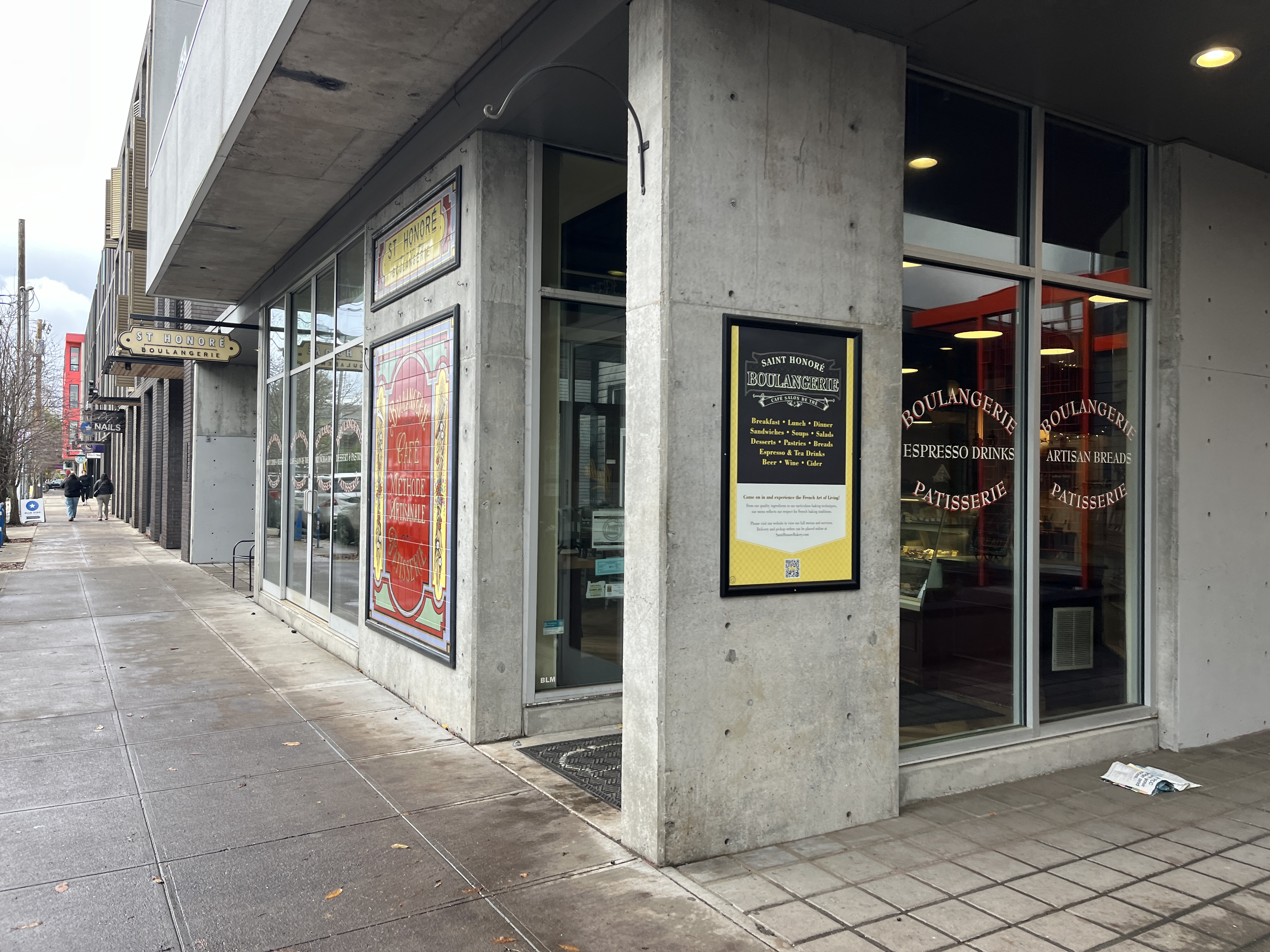
- Exterior of the St. Honoré Boulangerie in southeast Portland, 2024

Restaurant information
- Food type: French
- Location: Portland; Lake Oswego, Oregon, United States

St. Honoré Boulangerie, also known as St. Honoré Bakery, is a bakery in the U.S. state of Oregon. The Portland-based business operates five locations.

== Description ==
The French bakery St. Honoré Boulangerie operates in the U.S. state of Oregon. The menu includes breads, salads, sandwiches, soups, quiches, tarts, croissants, macarons, hard ciders, and almond cakes, among other baked goods and pastries. There are gluten-free options. The location in southeast Portland has custom painted tiles.

== History ==
According to The Oregonian, the business was started by spouses Dominique and Stephanie Geulin in 1993; other sources suggest the business was established in 2003. The original storefront opened on Thurman Street in northwest Portland's Northwest District in 2003. A second location opened in Lake Oswego in 2007, and a third location opened at the intersection of Division Street and 33rd Place in southeast Portland's Richmond neighborhood in 2013. A fourth location opened in downtown Portland's Morgan Building in 2016. In mid April 2024, a kitchen and fifth location opened on Macadam Avenue in south Portland. The restaurant has a patio and outdoor seating, but no indoor seating. The kitchen is used to supply all locations.

Dominique Geulin is the owner and head baker. He has also been described as the chief executive officer and president. On behalf of the bakery, Geulin accepted the award for Business of the Year from Lake Oswego's chamber of commerce in 2023.

== Reception ==
Brooke Jackson-Glidden and other writers included St. Honoré in Eater Portland's 2024 list of the city's best French restaurants.

== See also ==
- List of bakeries
- List of French restaurants
