= La Provence and Petite Provence =

Chain of bakeries in Portland, Oregon

Logo

La Provence and Petite Provence are related chains of French bakeries in the Portland metropolitan area, in the United States. There were seven locations in the area, as of November 2017. In Portland, there are locations on Alberta Street and Division Street, and there are also locations in Beaverton, Hillsboro, Lake Oswego, and The Dalles, as well as Vancouver, Washington. Petite Provence Boulangerie and Patisserie, or simply Petite Provence, has been described as a spin-off of La Provence.

== Description and history ==
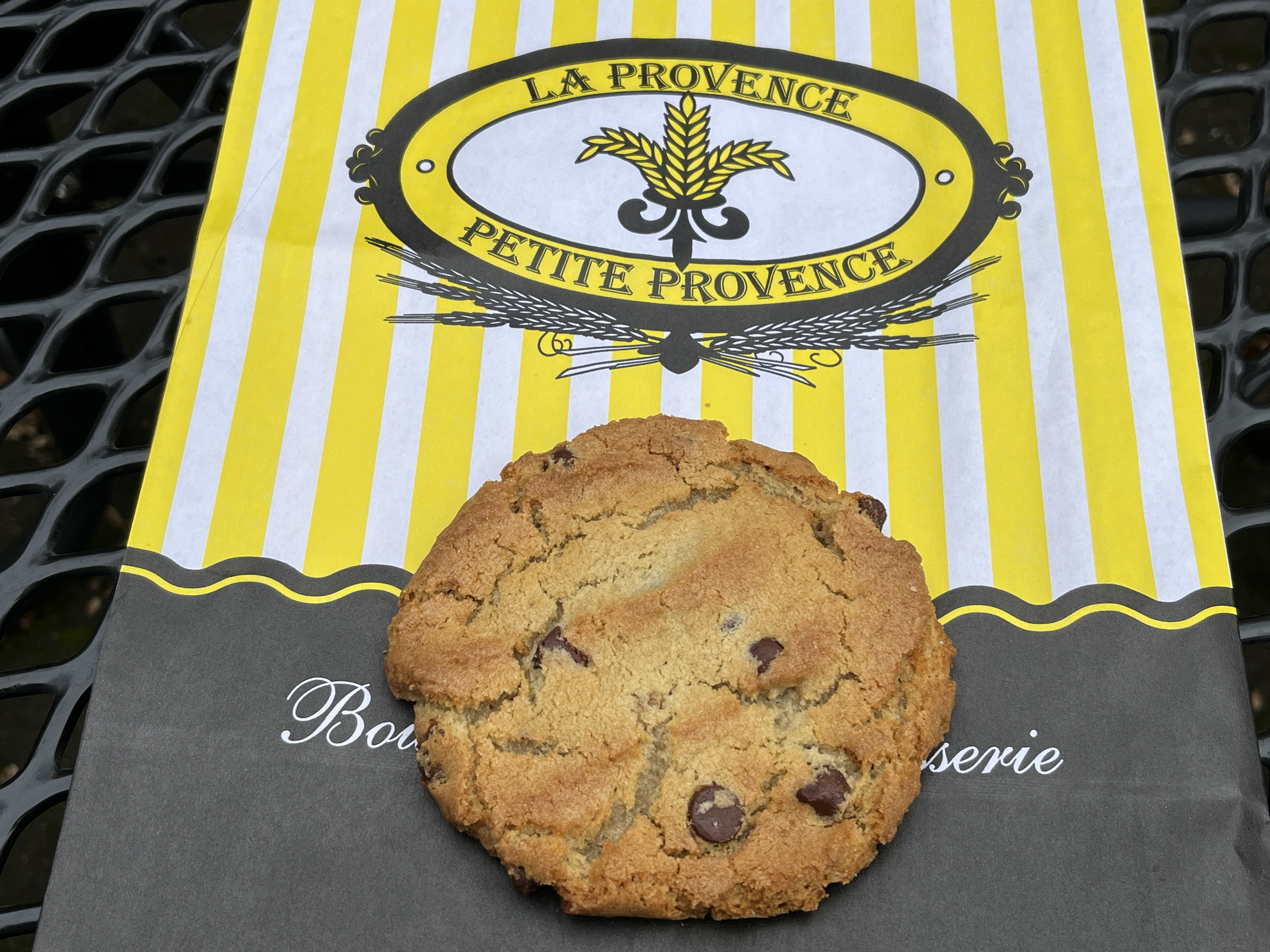
Chocolate chip cookie on top of a paper bag branded with both La Provence and Petite Provence, 2024

The chains of French bakeries serve breakfast items like omelettes, a salmon hash, and coffee drinks, as well as desserts. The locations offer king cake for Mardi Gras. There has also been a location at Portland International Airport.

=== La Provence ===
La Provence opened in Lake Oswego in 1996. La Provence has also operated in northeast Portland, southeast Portland, and The Dalles. In Beaverton, La Provence has operated in Progress Ridge TownSquare. La Provence has operated at Cedar Hills Crossing since October 2024.

Alain Machtelinckx is a co-owner of La Provence.

=== Petite Provence ===
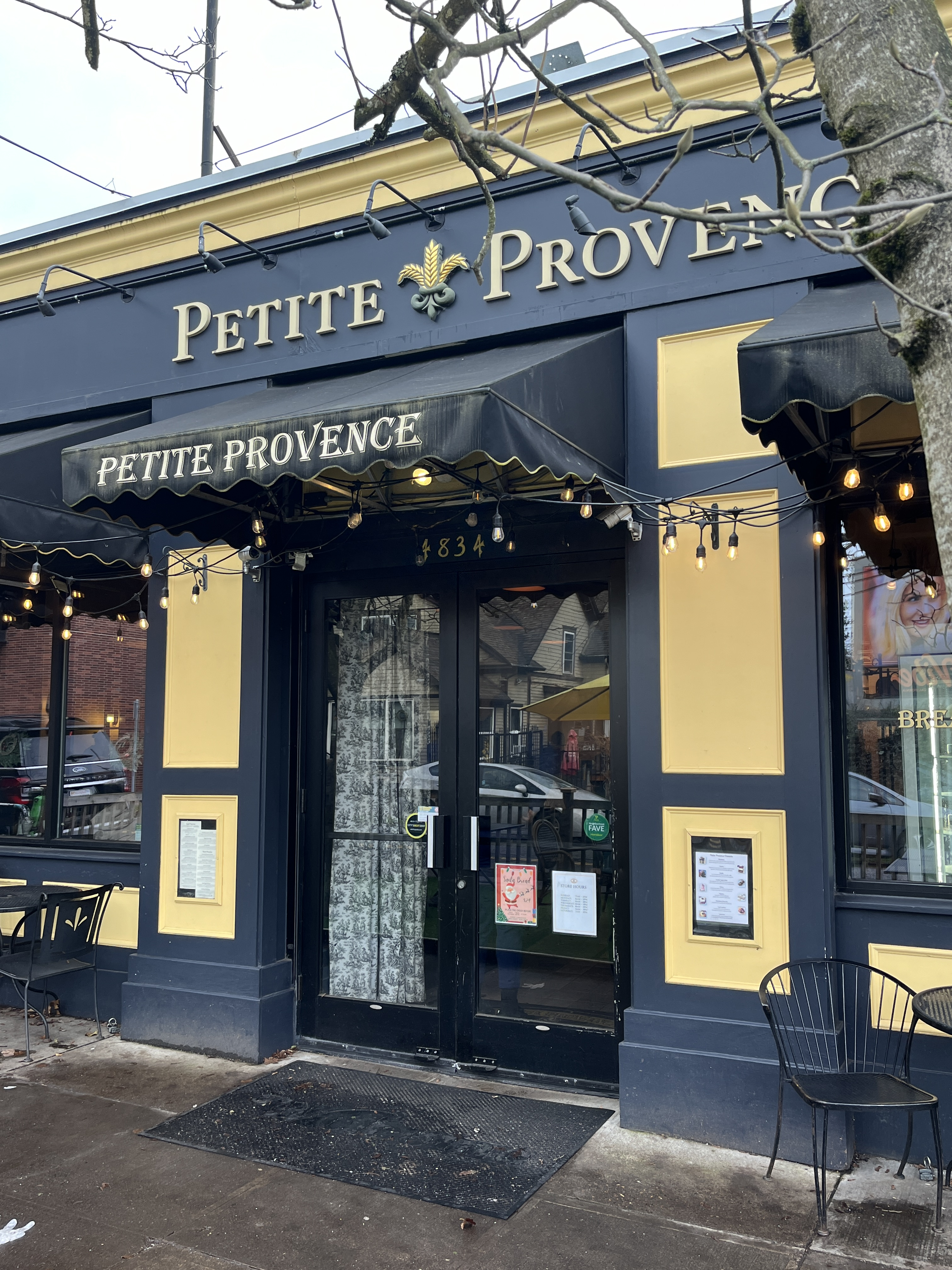
Exterior of Petite Provence, southeast Portland, Oregon, 2024

Petite Provence has been described as a spin-off of Lake Oswego-based La Provence. Petite Provence serves Eggs Benedict, quiches, sandwiches (including Monte Cristos), a scramble with brie and sausage, and soups (including French onion), as well as breads and baked goods such as baguettes and croissants. Some locations also offer dinner service.

The interior of Petite Provence along Alberta has tile floors and wicker chairs.

== Reception ==
Krista Garcia included Petite Provence in Eater Portland's 2024 overview of the city's best French onion soups. Brooke Jackson-Glidden and other writers also included Petite Provence in the website's 2024 list of Portland's best French restaurants.

== See also ==
- List of bakeries
- List of French restaurants
- List of restaurant chains in the United States
