= Le Happy =

Defunct restaurant in the U.S. state of Oregon

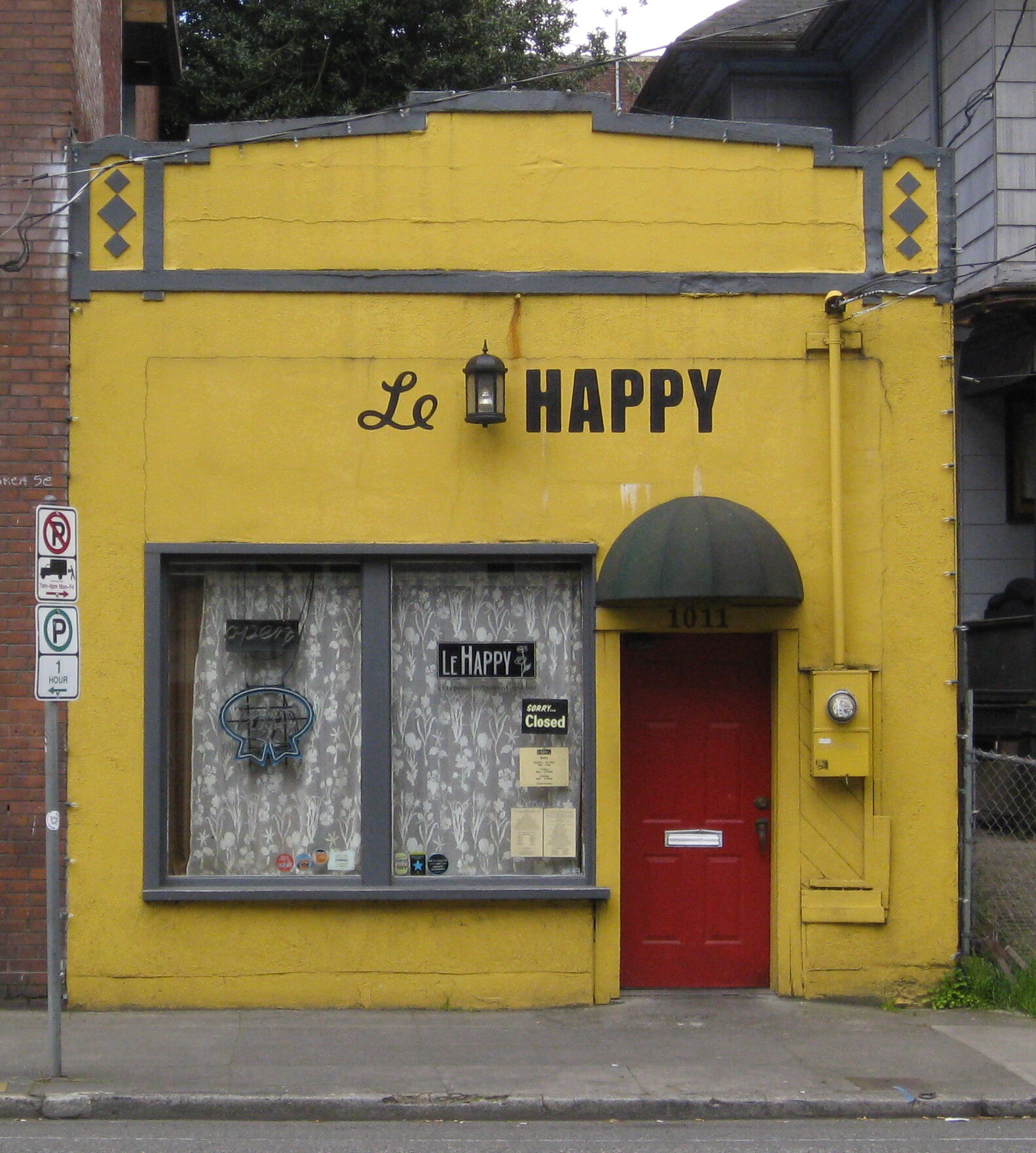
- Exterior of the crêperie's previous location in Portland, Oregon's Northwest District, in 2008
- Interactive map of Le Happy

Restaurant information
- Food type: French
- Location: 1011 Northwest 16th Avenue, Portland, Multnomah, Oregon, 97209, United States
- Coordinates: 45.53024°N 122.68762°W
- Website: www.lehappy.com

Le Happy was a crêperie in Sandy, Oregon, United States. Previously, the restaurant operated in northwest Portland's Northwest District. Le Happy has closed permanently.

== Description ==
Le Happy was a crêperie on Proctor Boulevard in Sandy, Oregon. Previously, the family-friendly establishment operated in the Northwest District of northwest Portland. In Portland, Le Happy was known as a late-night destination, operating from 5pm to 1am Monday through Thursday, 5pm to 2:30am on Friday, and 6pm to 2:30am on Saturday. The exterior featured a yellow façade and a string of white lights. Inside is a small kitchen to house a single chef. Interior decorations included red lights, artificial flowers above the bar, broken eyeglasses affixed to the wall, and votive candles set at tables. Board games were available for use by diners.

=== Menu ===
The restaurant's menu featured both savory and sweet crêpes with a variety of ingredients. Savory options included Ma Provence (chicken, cheeses, tomatoes) and Le Trash Blanc (bacon and cheddar cheese). Other savory ingredients included black beans, cilantro, cucumbers, ham, onions, panang sauce, and tofu. Sweet crêpes included Citron Gingembre, which contains lemon curd and ginger. Other ingredients for sweet crêpes included fruits, berry preserves, semisweet chocolate sauce, and whipped cream. Crêpe meals for children had cheddar cheese and came with a toy. Salads were also available as entrees. Beverages included beer, ciders, cocktails, coffee, juices, teas, and wine.

== History ==
In 2012, the restaurant contributed food and wine to "Fresh French Shorts", Northwest Film Center's annual showcase of short films by emerging French directors. The series was sponsored by Alliance Française de Portland and screened at the Portland Art Museum. Le Happy also supported Portland State University's "MFA Monday Night Lecture Series", a series of free public lectures.

== Reception ==
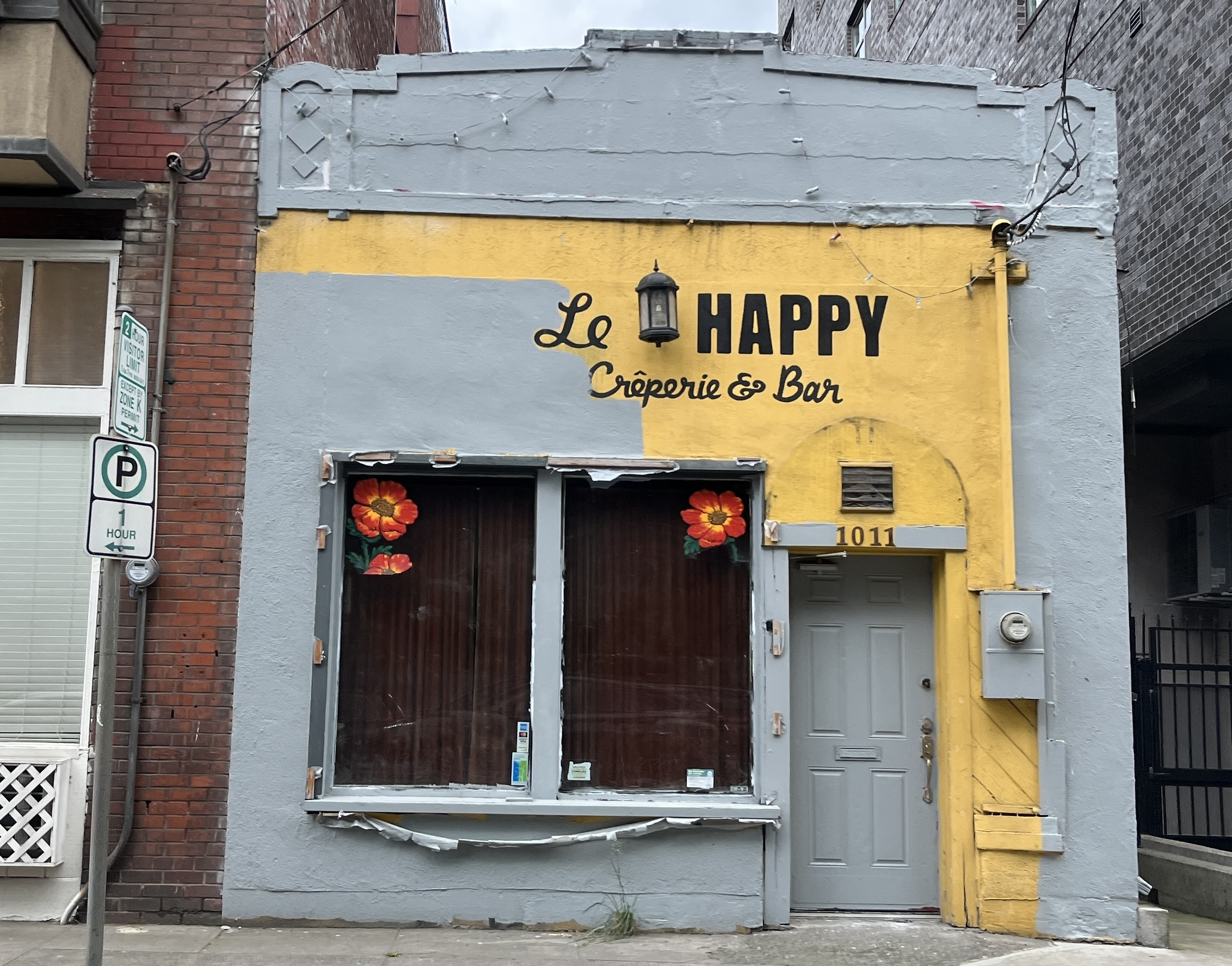
The building that previously housed Le Happy in 2024

The Portland Mercury described the restaurant's atmosphere as "lively and intimate without feeling crowded" and its food "delicious in every way". Portland Monthly said the crêperie "[masquerades] as a trendy dive bar" and is a "solid late-night option for Northwest nommers". Willamette Week called Le Happy an "ideal balance of sassy and sweet" and said the sweet crêpes "are the ones that really sing". Spin magazine called it a "classy joint" in their "Underground Guide" of the city, which featured local favorites of the Portland-based indie rock band The Thermals.

The crêperie was featured in several guide books of Portland, including as a "Best Late Night" establishment in Food Lovers' Guide to Portland, Oregon (2014) and as a recommended French food restaurant in Moon Oregon (2014), which called it a "hipster faux-dive bar". Fodor's said Le Happy was a "romantic dinner-date spot" and a "cozy place" for a drink and snack. Like Spin, the book called the restaurant "classy", but "not without a sense of humor", noting the inclusion of a can of Pabst Blue Ribbon with the Le Trash Blanc. Frommer's Portland Day by Day said the restaurant was "charming" and "seems straight out of a Paris side street". It was included in at least one published walking tour of the Northwest District's Slabtown area.

In 2023, Levi Rogers included Le Happy in Eater Portland's overview of recommended eateries in Sandy.

== See also ==
- List of defunct restaurants of the United States
- List of French restaurants
