= Bell's (restaurant) =

Restaurant in Los Alamos, California, U.S.

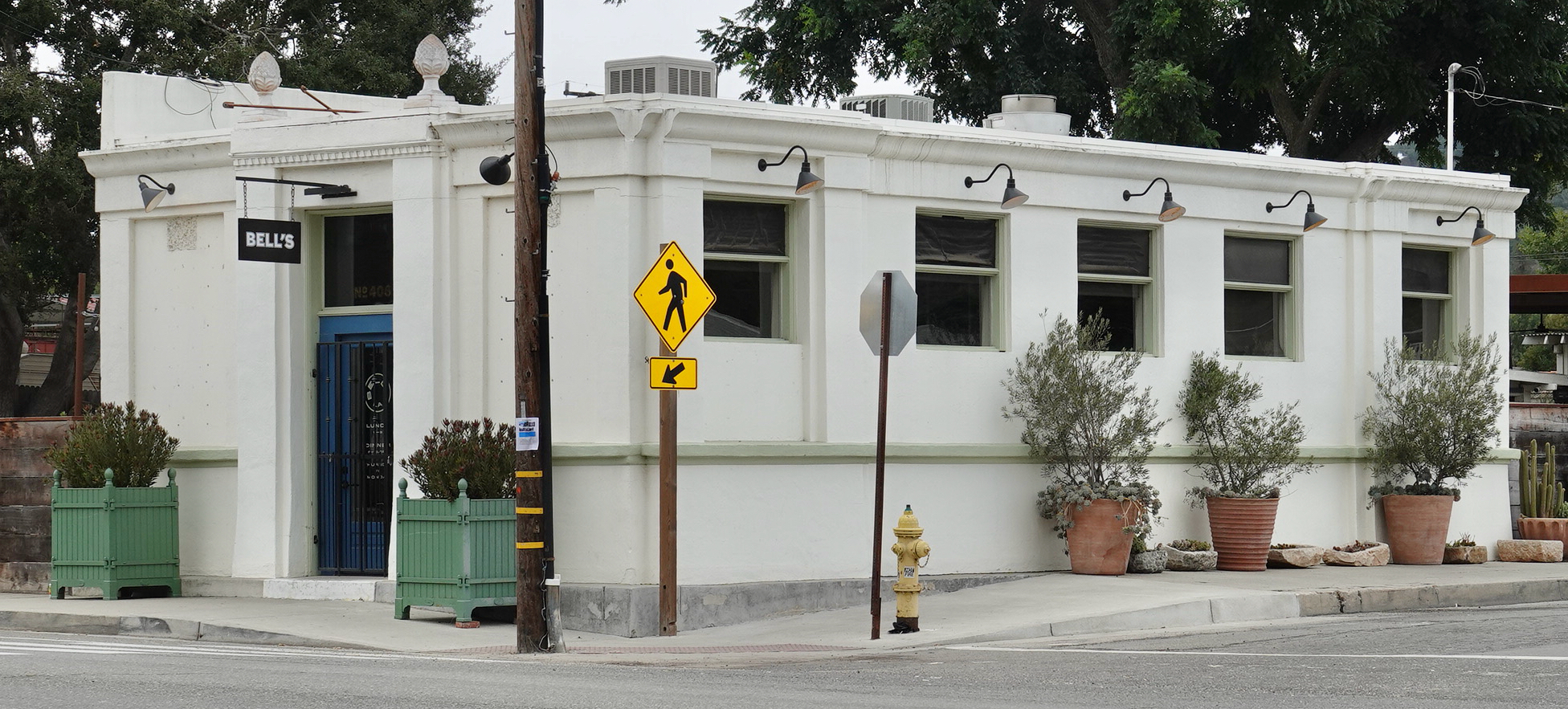
- Bell's in October 2025
- Interactive map of Bell's

Restaurant information
- Owners: Greg and Daisy Ryan
- Head chef: Daisy Ryan
- Food type: Californian; French
- Rating: (Michelin Guide)
- Location: 406 Bell Street, Los Alamos, Santa Barbara, California, 93440, United States
- Coordinates: 34°44′38.3″N 120°16′45.7″W
- Website: bellsrestaurant.com

Bell's is a restaurant serving Californian and French cuisine in Los Alamos, California. The restaurant has received a Michelin star.

== Description ==
Bell's serves a French-inspired menu. Its dishes include moules-frites, while desserts include a Santa Barbara uni crêpe cake and black pepper cookies.

== History ==
The restaurant opened a branch seafood restaurant called Bar Le Côte on September 2, 2021.

== Reception ==
Bell's has received one Michelin star, denoting "high quality cooking". Condé Nast Traveler described Bell's as a "shining star", praising the wine, food, and service.

== See also ==
- List of French restaurants
- List of Michelin-starred restaurants in California
