= L'Échelle (restaurant) =

Restaurant in Portland, Oregon, U.S.

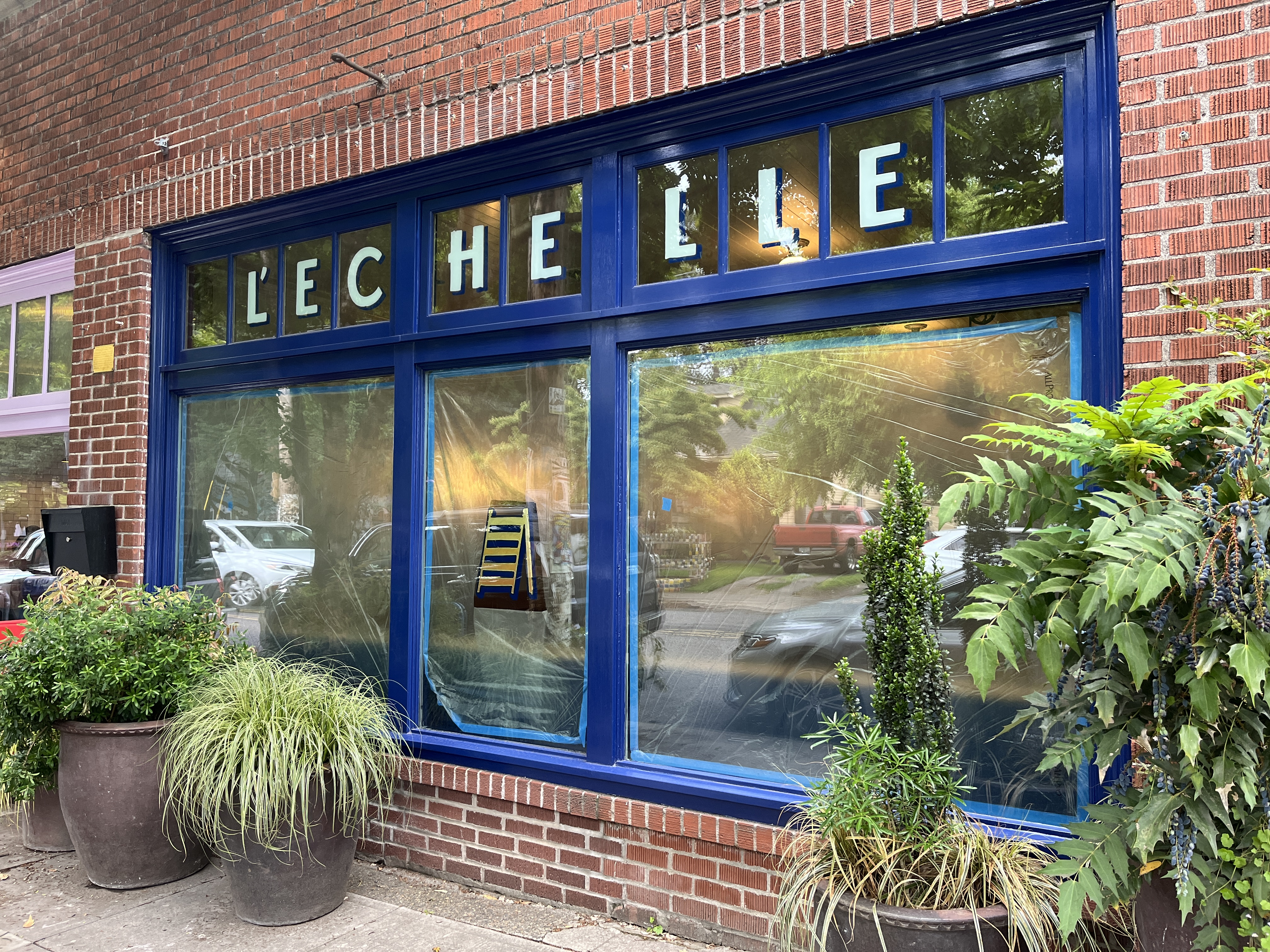
- The restaurant's exterior, 2025
- Interactive map of L'Échelle

Restaurant information
- Food type: French
- Location: 4537 Southeast Division Street, Portland, Multnomah, Oregon, United States
- Coordinates: 45°30′19″N 122°36′55″W
- Reservations: No
- Website: lechellepdx.com

L'Échelle is a restaurant in Portland, Oregon, United States. It opened in August 2024, as the final project of American chef Naomi Pomeroy, who died in July 2024.

== Description ==
The French-inspired restaurant L'Échelle, which translates to "the ladder" in French and is named after the Prince song "The Ladder", operates on Division Street in southeast Portland's Richmond neighborhood. According to Eater Portland, L'Échelle serves "lighter versions of French bistro food" with locally sourced ingredients. The menu has included French onion soup, country-style rabbit pate, chicken schnitzel with chickpea panisse, and bread from Cafe Olli with shallot butter. The restaurant has open seating and does not take reservations.

== History ==
Luke Dirks opened L'Échelle on August 15, 2024, near the intended future space that previously housed The Woodsman Tavern. L'Échelle's launch was impacted by the death of chef Naomi Pomeroy, who died on July 13, 2024. L'Échelle began operating as a casual and "experimental" pop-up bistro, and planned to become a full service restaurant in 2025. As of late 2024, Dirks was fundraising for a permanent space.

Mika Paredes was announced as the executive chef in February 2025. The restaurant began operating again on May 28, 2025.

== Reception ==
Janey Wong of Eater Portland said of dining at the temporary location: "Sitting in the garden where the pop-up is held with a glass of wine in hand, it almost felt like I was dining al fresco in Europe instead of right off Division Street." The website's Zoe Baillargeon included the business in a 2025 list of Portland's best new restaurants and food carts. The business ranked number 34 in Resy's 2025 list of the nation's top 100 dining destinations. Hannah Wallace included the business in Condé Nast Traveler's 2025 list of Portland's 23 best restaurants. L'Echelle was named Restaurant of the Year by The Oregonian. The newspaper's Michael Russell also included the business in a 2025 list of Portland's ten best new restaurants. He included the French onion soup in The Oregonian's list of Portland's 25 best dishes of 2025. Alex Frane included the business in Portland Monthly's 2025 list of restaurant opening that defined the city in 2025.

== See also ==
- List of French restaurants
