= La Parisienne French Bakery =

Bakery in Seattle, Washington, U.S.

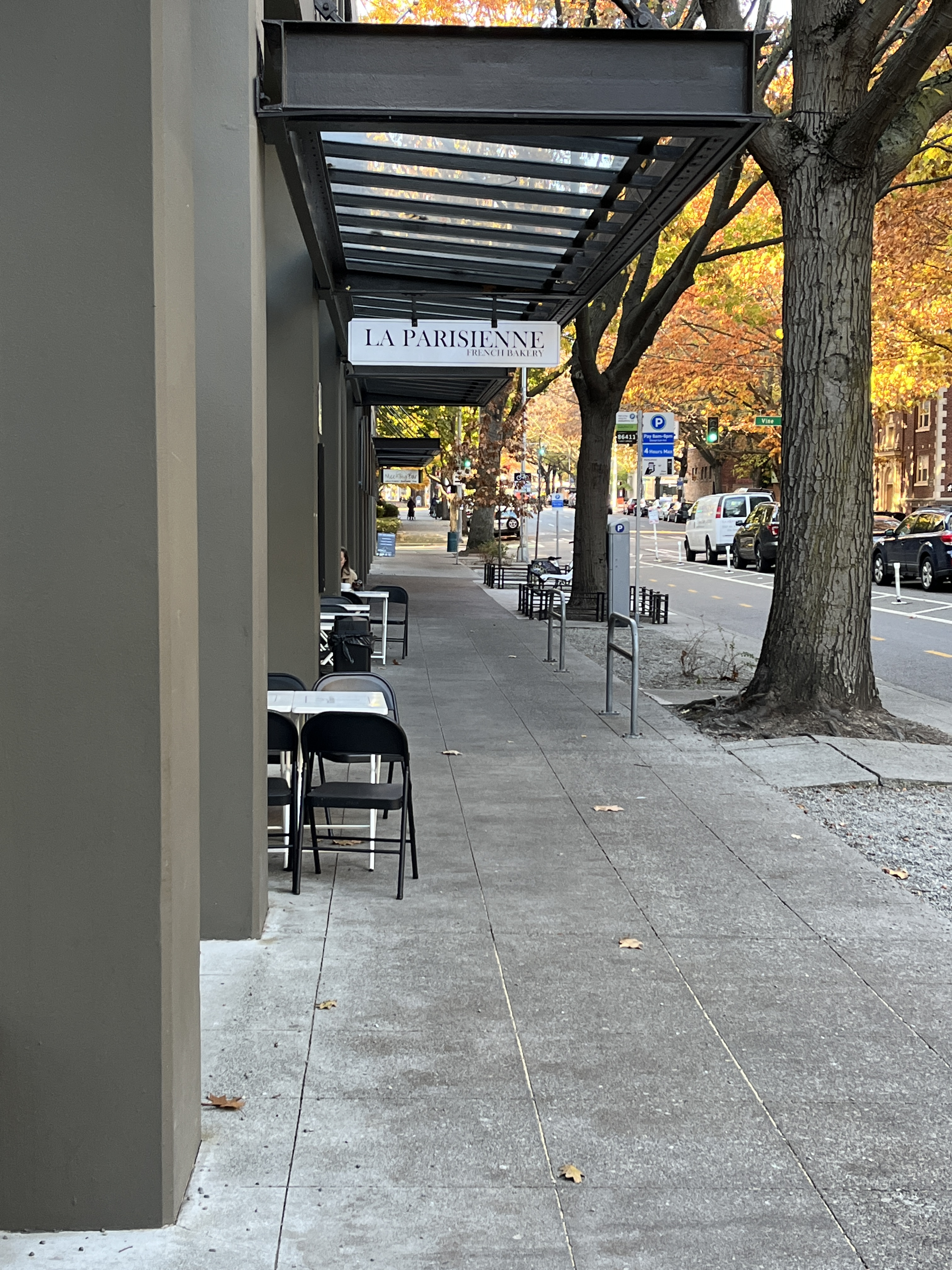
- The bakery's exterior, 2022
- Interactive map of La Parisienne French Bakery

Restaurant information
- Location: 2507 4th Avenue, Seattle, King, Washington, 98121, United States
- Coordinates: 47.6167°N 122.3466°W
- Website: laparisienneseattle.com

La Parisienne French Bakery is a French bakery in Seattle's Belltown neighborhood, in the U.S. state of Washington. Owned by the Morin family, the business has also operated an outpost in Bellevue.

== Description ==
La Parisienne is a traditional French bakery on Fourth Avenue in downtown Seattle's Belltown neighborhood. The business has sold galette des rois, described by Seattle Magazine as "a French style" of king cake.

== History ==
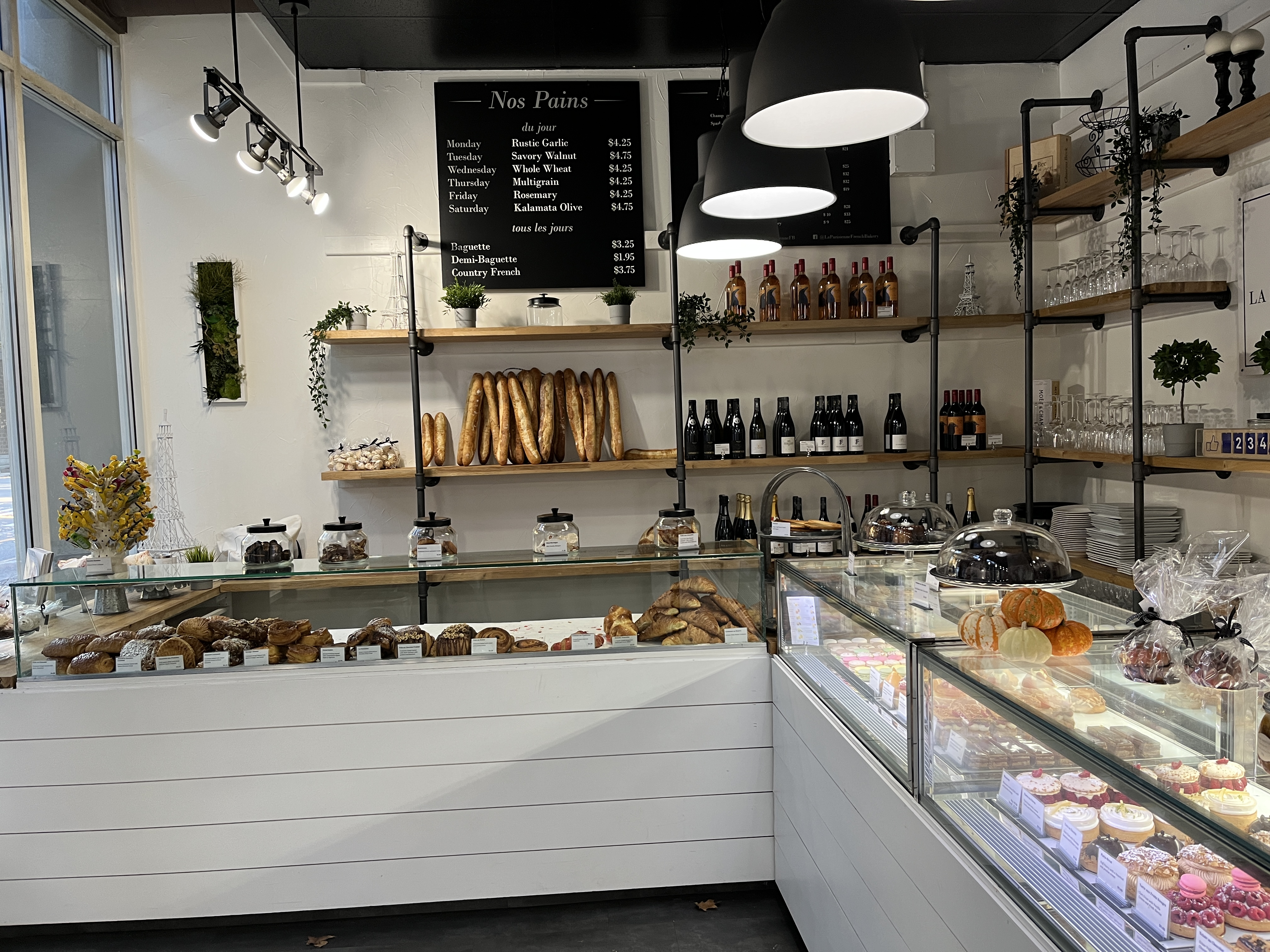
Interior in 2022

In 2015, following the November 2015 Paris attacks, "La Parisienne bakery flew the French flag ... and opened its doors to the local community. By noon, the bakery was bursting at the seams with people spilling out on to the sidewalk. They hugged and kissed one another -- some wearing French flags around their necks, others carrying flowers." Mayor Ed Murray joined the gathering of approximately 150 people, which included a moment of silence. According to KING-TV, "Murray's spokesman [said] they wanted to honor those affected by the horrific attacks." Attendees also sang "La Marseillaise", France's national anthem.

In 2018, the bakery opened an outpost in Bellevue, in collaboration with Cépaé Tasting Room. Megan Hill of Eater Seattle wrote, "The bakery's selection, meant to complement the wines next door, includes pastries from croissants to Paris-Brest, lunch options like salad nicoise, sandwiches, and quiches, and, in the evening, boards with charcuterie, seafood, cheese, and vegetables."

La Parisienne products were featured at Amazon's first Go Grocery store as of 2020.

== Reception ==
Christina Ausley included the croissants in the Seattle Post-Intelligencer's 2019 overview of the city's "busiest bakeries and their iconic pastries", as well as the newspaper's 2020 overview of Seattle's best croissants.

== See also ==
- List of bakeries
- List of French restaurants
