= Coquine =

Restaurant in Portland, Oregon, U.S.

- Interactive map of Coquine

Restaurant information
- Established: July 16, 2015
- Owners: Katy Millard and Ksandek Podbielski
- Head chef: Katy Millard
- Food type: French, with Japanese and Southern influences
- Dress code: Casual
- Location: 6839 Southeast Belmont Street, Portland, Multnomah, Oregon, 97215, United States
- Coordinates: 45°31′1.5″N 122°35′32.8″W
- Seating capacity: ~30 people
- Reservations: Required
- Website: www.coquinepdx.com/welcome

Coquine is a restaurant located in the Mount Tabor neighborhood of Portland, Oregon, United States. The restaurant serves French-inspired food made from ingredients purchased from local farms as well as Stumptown Coffee. In October 2026, the owner announced plans to close by the end of the month, expand the space, and reopen as Katy Jane's.

== History ==
Co-owner Katy Millard was born in Rhodesia to an American father and Portuguese mother, but the family left during the uprising when the country became Zimbabwe, settling in Mobile, Alabama. As a child, she would make six-hour pasta dishes with her father. Later, Millard worked in restaurants in Mobile and in East Lansing, Michigan. After finishing college, Millard decided to spend two months backpacking Europe. On the trip, her father took her to the Guy Savoy restaurant, where she had a meal that "changed her life." Millard returned to the restaurant the next day where she met Guy Savoy and gave him her resume. Savoy hired Millard to work at one of his satellite bistros, where she worked for five years. Later, she worked for Daniel Patterson at Coi in San Francisco and helped him open Plum, his restaurant in Oakland, California. Millard's husband and co-owner, Ksandek Podbielski was also born in a small town in West Germany where his mother was a school teacher and his father was serving in the United States Army. He later returned to the United States, eventually moving to Oregon and working at a vineyard, where he managed the winery's hospitality department. Podbielski soon began working in restaurants as well.

In 2012, Millard and Podbielski started a pop-up restaurant series called the Coquine Supper Club at Dancing Roots Farm in Troutdale, Oregon, wineries, and special events. Millard and Podbielski opened Coquine in July 2015 serving only dinner and expecting to operate primarily as a coffee shop. On August 7, 2015, Coquine began serving counter service lunch and breakfast.

In July 2017, Coquine began serving full service lunch.

Katy Jane's Oyster Bar has been described as a sibling restaurant to Coquine.

== Reception ==
In 2015, its opening year, Coquine was named Restaurant of the Year by Eater Portland and Katy Millard was nominated for Chef of the Year. Coquine was also a finalist in the 2016 James Beard Foundation Awards and was named one of Bon Appétit's top fifty "best new restaurants". The Oregonian named Coquine the 2016 Restaurant of the Year. The newspaper's Michael Russell later included the business in a 2025 list of the 21 best restaurants in southeast Portland. He also ranked Coquine number 3 in The Oregonian's 2025 list of Portland's 40 best restaurants.

In 2017, 2018, 2019, and 2020, Katy Millard was nominated by the James Beard Foundation for Best Chef: Northwest. In October 2021, Coquine was listed in the New York Times' 2021 Restaurant List as one of "50 places in America we're most excited about right now." Coquine Market was included in Time Out Portland's 2025 list of the city's eighteen best restaurants. Hannah Wallace included the business in Condé Nast Traveler's 2025 list of Portland's 23 best restaurants.

== See also ==
- List of French restaurants
