= Jeune et Jolie (restaurant) =

Restaurant in Carlsbad, California, U.S.

- Interactive map of Jeune et Jolie

Restaurant information
- Owner: John Resnick
- Head chef: Eric Bost
- Food type: French
- Rating: (Michelin Guide)
- Location: 2659 State St., Carlsbad, California, 92008, United States
- Coordinates: 33°9′46.9″N 117°21′6.2″W
- Website: https://www.jeune-jolie.com/

Jeune et Jolie is a Michelin-starred French restaurant in Carlsbad, California, United States.

== See also ==
- Lilo (restaurant)
- List of French restaurants
- List of Michelin-starred restaurants in California
