= La Goulue (restaurant) =

French restaurant in New York City, U.S.

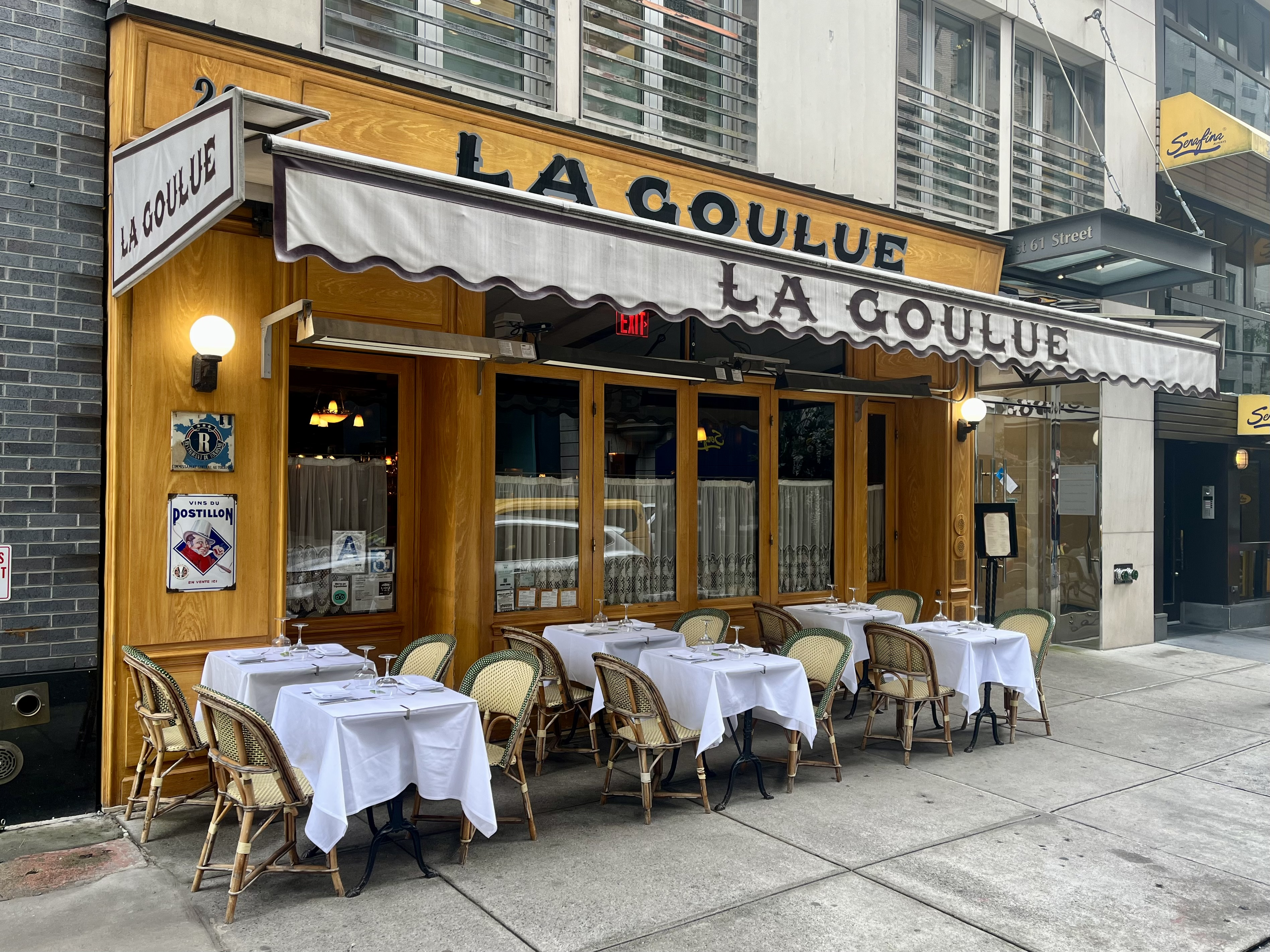
- La Goulue in 2023
- Interactive map of La Goulue

Restaurant information
- Established: February 21, 1973
- Food type: French
- Location: 29 East 61st Street, New York City, New York, 10065, United States
- Coordinates: 40°45′53″N 73°58′12″W
- Website: lagouluerestaurant.com

La Goulue is a French restaurant in New York City that originally opened in 1973, and, after closing in 2009, reopened in 2017. The restaurant had a Michelin star until 2008.

== See also ==
- List of French restaurants
- List of Michelin-starred restaurants in New York City
