= Chez Machin =

French restaurant in Portland, Oregon, U.S.

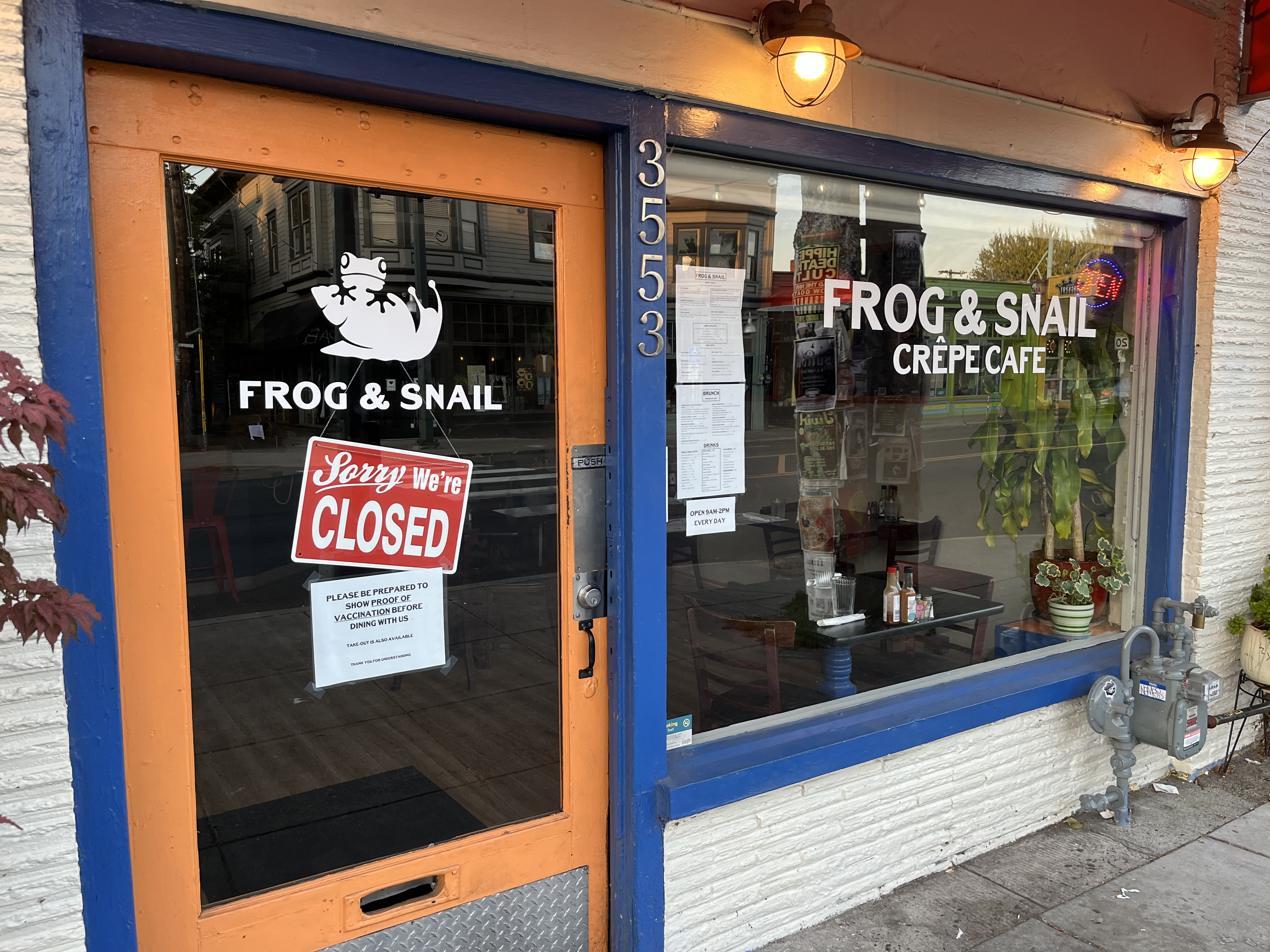
- The restaurant's exterior, 2022
- Interactive map of Chez Machin

Restaurant information
- Closed: 2023
- Food type: French
- Location: 3553 Southeast Hawthorne Boulevard, Portland, Multnomah, Oregon, 97214, United States
- Coordinates: 45.5123°N 122.6276°W
- Website: frogandsnail.com

Chez Machin (later Frog & Snail) was a French restaurant in Portland, Oregon. The crêperie operated in southeast Portland's Sunnyside neighborhood. Its name was changed to Frog & Snail in 2020, during the COVID-19 pandemic. It closed in 2023, following the owner's death.

== Description ==
Chez Machin, later known as Frog & Snail, was a crêperie in southeast Portland's Sunnyside neighborhood. In 2004, Katie Shimer of the Portland Mercury described Chez Machin as a "small, welcoming restaurant" with a "wide open front door, red and white checked tablecloths, and calming French bistro atmosphere". She also said the tables "offer a comfortable distance, so you can feel free to propose marriage or break up with someone, without everyone eavesdropping".

In 2011, Allison Jones of Portland Monthly wrote, "The space is tiny, cozy, and very French, with a great back patio that is a welcome respite from busy Hawthorne." The restaurant's exterior featured a small red replica of the Eiffel Tower and the interior had a mural by Gus Van Sant.

=== Menu ===
The French menu included savory and sweet varieties of buckwheat crêpes, including a gluten-free option. The La Bèchamel had black forest ham, Swiss cheese, mushrooms, scallions, and béchamel sauce, and the L'Allemande had bacon, potatoes, caramelized onions, and roasted red pepper coulis. The Classic had Nutella, banana, and crumbled graham crackers. Savory varieties included the BBQ, the Grilled Cheese, and the German, which had potatoes au gratin, caramelized onion jam, bacon, scallions, and homemade crème fraîche. The menu also included quiches and French onion soup. Salads included the Salade Regim (spring greens, green apple, toasted almonds, gorgonzola, and vinaigrette) and the Salade Bistro, which had bay shrimp, avocado, hard-boiled egg, and Dijon vinaigrette. Drink options included coffee and wine.

== History ==
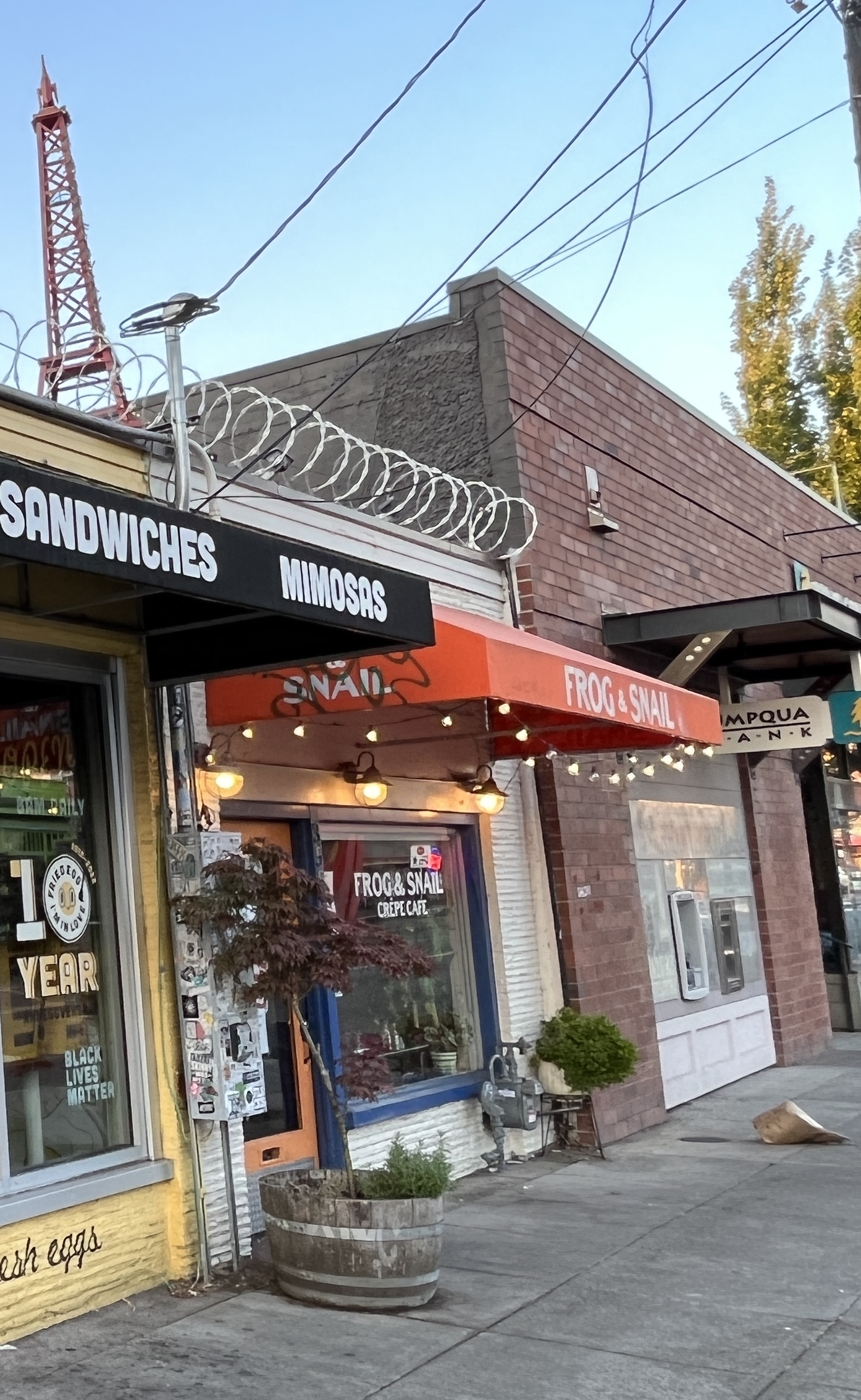
Frog & Snail with its Eiffel Tower replica, 2022

Gus Van Sant painted the mural in 1986, when the building housed a Macheezmo Mouse restaurant.

In 2007, Eric John Kaiser celebrated the release of his debut album L'Odyssée by performing at Chez Machin. The restaurant was burglarized in 2017.

In 2020, during the COVID-19 pandemic, Chad Bernard changed the restaurant's name to Frog & Snail and overhauled the menu. The restaurant closed in 2023, following Bernard's death.

== Reception ==
The Portland Mercury's Katie Shimer wrote in 2004:

Unlike a lot of restaurants, Chez Machin does an excellent job of pairing the rich sauces and cheese you crave, with the healthy, fresh foods you wish you were eating more of. They also do that thing good Portland restaurants do where they combine the romantic 'dining out' atmosphere with a price that won't make your eyes bug out like Roger Rabbit. 'Twixt the greasy pub grub and patchouli stank that is Hawthorne Boulevard, this little Parisian slice is a blessed sanctuary.

In 2011, Portland Monthly's Allison Jones wrote, "Prices are higher here, but the sit-down cafe experience is top-notch." In 2017, Carrie Uffindell of Eater Portland included Chez Machin in a list of "the best creperies and crepe-centric cafés throughout the city" and said the restaurant is among Portland's "more traditional French-rooted options".

== See also ==
- List of French restaurants
