= Restaurant Yuu =

Restaurant in New York City

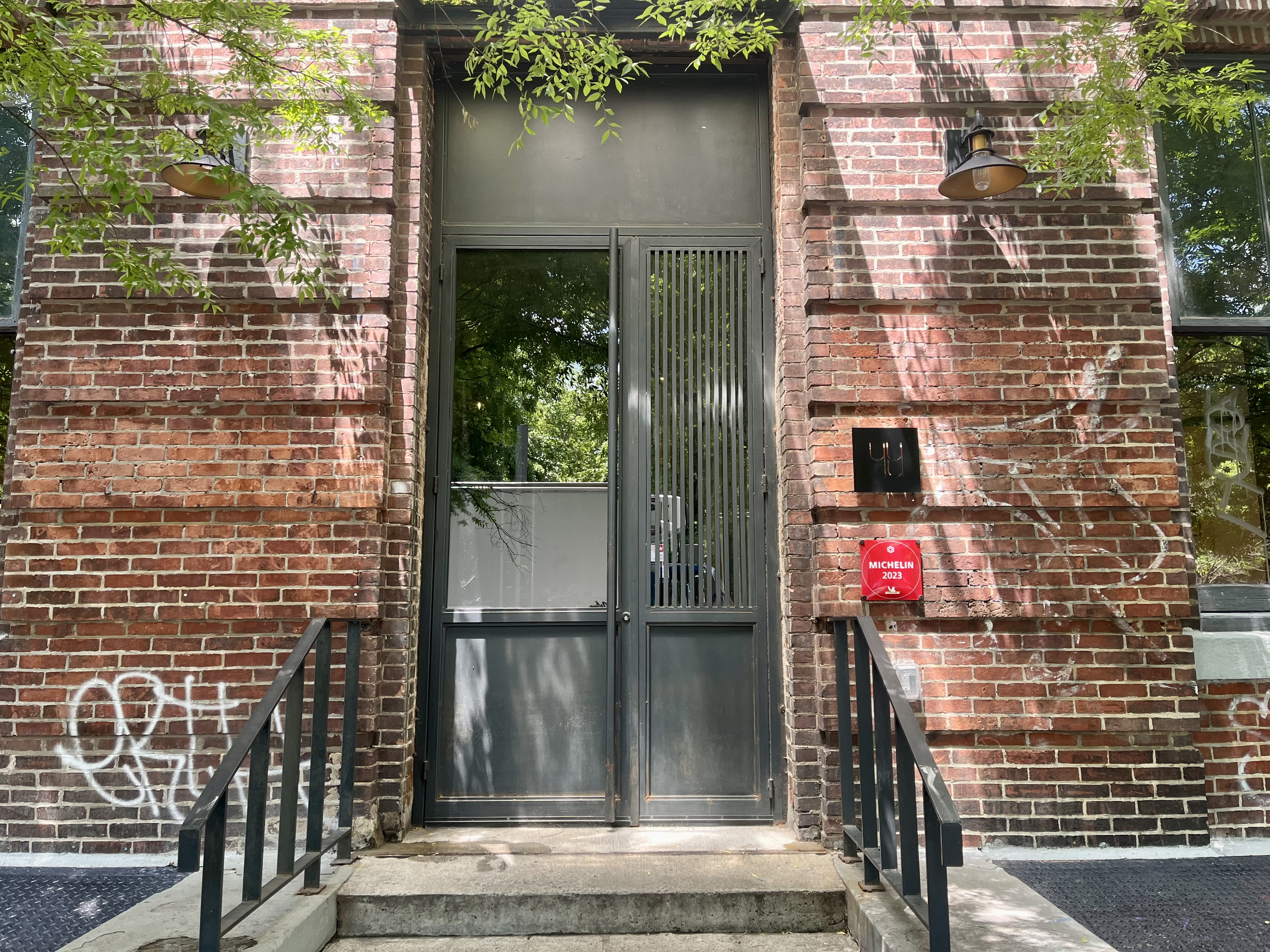
- The restaurant's exterior in 2024
- Interactive map of Restaurant Yuu

Restaurant information
- Established: May 2023
- Owner: Yuu Shimano
- Chef: Shuji Furukawa
- Pastry chef: Masaki Takahashi
- Dress code: French cuisine with Japanese influence
- Rating: Michelin Guide
- Location: 55 Nassau Avenue, Brooklyn, New York, 11222, United States
- Coordinates: 40°43′24″N 73°57′09″W
- Seating capacity: 18
- Reservations: Reservation only
- Website: www.yuunewyork.com/restaurantyuu/

Restaurant Yuu is a restaurant in Brooklyn, New York. It has received a Michelin star.

== See also ==
- List of French restaurants
- List of Michelin-starred restaurants in New York City
