= Lilo (restaurant) =

Restaurant in Carlsbad, California, U.S.

- Interactive map of Lilo

Restaurant information
- Head chef: Eric Bost
- Rating: (Michelin Guide)
- Location: 2571 Roosevelt Street, Carlsbad, California, 92008, United States
- Coordinates: 33°9′52″N 117°21′5″W
- Seating capacity: 22-seat counter
- Other information: 12-course tasting menu

Lilo is a Michelin-starred restaurant in Carlsbad, California, United States. It was included in The New York Times's 2025 list of the nation's 50 best restaurants.

Lilo, coined from The Dictionary of Obscure Sorrows, is a made-up word to describe “a friendship that can lie dormant for years only to pick right back up instantly, as if no time had passed since you last saw each other.”

== See also ==
- Jeune et Jolie (restaurant)
- List of Michelin-starred restaurants in California
