= Macheezmo Mouse =

Restaurant chain based in the U.S. state of Oregon

Restaurant information
- Established: 1981
- Closed: May 2003
- Food type: Mexican
- Location: United States

Macheezmo Mouse was a fast food Mexican restaurant chain based in the U.S. state of Oregon.

== Description ==
Macheezmo Mouse served Mexican food with a focus on fast service, fresh ingredients, and inexpensive, healthy menu options. In 2016, a 90s retrospective by The Oregonian's Lizzy Acker remembered the chain's "affordable, 'healthy' food in a fast casual environment everybody's mom loved."

== History ==
William "Tiger" Warren founded Macheezmo Mouse in collaboration with Michael Vidor in 1981, adapting the restaurant's name from one of his nicknames. While the company made a brief and unsuccessful attempt to expand to the San Francisco Bay area, by 1994 it had grown to include 13 locations in the Portland and Seattle areas, when it made an initial public offering in an effort to fund growth and ongoing operations. At the time, despite annual operating profits of $789,000, the company's total operations had resulted in "negative retained earnings" and showed working capital of negative $640,000. The stock price opened at $6/share and briefly rose as high as $11, allowing the chain to grow to a peak of 23 restaurants. However, same-store sales fell by 25% over the next year and profits collapsed to a third of IPO levels, sending the stock falling to $3.25/share by the end of September 1995. In 1997, the company closed its remaining Seattle stores, and by 1999 the stock was trading for "pennies", despite expanding its offerings into packaged burritos offered through regional Costco stores. Founder William Warren died on November 27, 1999, when the de Havilland Beaver he was piloting crashed into the Columbia River just after takeoff.

After a continued decline, the company closed its last four restaurants and filed for Chapter 7 bankruptcy in May 2003, leaving many employees unpaid.

=== Attempts to Relaunch ===
In 2010, Diane Hall, one of the company's early directors, attempted to revive the restaurant's "Boss Sauce" as a bottled product.

Jeff and Danell Burlingame, who met while working at Macheezmo, later purchased the company's trademarks, recipes, and operations guides from Hall and in 2013 announced plans to relaunch the chain. Their IndieGoGo campaign was intended to crowdfund $87,000 as proof of interest for investors, but was unsuccessful, raising less than $5,000. The Burlingames continued attempts to revive the chain through 2015, expressing hopes that "one or a handful of larger investors" would help provide $250,000 in funding for an initial location. As of 2022 no relaunch has occurred.

== Gus Van Sant mural ==
A restaurant in southeast Portland featured an interior mural by Warren's friend, Gus Van Sant. The mural was believed to be painted over, but was rediscovered in 2013 (Chez Machin, later Frog & Snail).

== See also ==
- List of casual dining restaurant chains
- List of restaurant chains in the United States
