= Citrin (restaurant) =

French restaurant in Santa Monica, California, U.S.

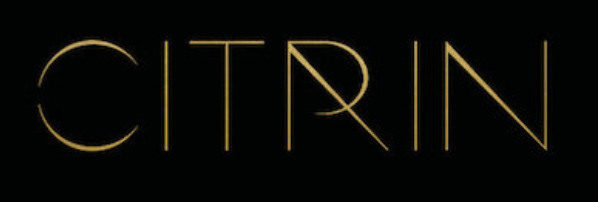
- Interactive map of Citrin

Restaurant information
- Owner: Josiah Citrin
- Head chef: Josiah Citrin
- Chef: Ken Takayama
- Food type: French
- Rating: (Michelin Guide)
- Location: 1104 Wilshire Boulevard, Santa Monica, California, 90401, United States
- Coordinates: 34°1′28″N 118°29′28.8″W
- Seating capacity: 99
- Website: www.citrinandmelisse.com/citrin

Citrin is a Michelin-starred French restaurant in Santa Monica, California, United States.

== Description ==
Citrin is located in the same building as its sister restaurant, Mélisse. Unlike Mélisse which offers a tasting menu-only format, Citrin offers a modest prix-fixe along with à la carte options.

The restaurant has a seating capacity of 99.

== See also ==
- List of French restaurants
- List of Michelin-starred restaurants in California
