= La Bastide by Andrea Calstier =

French restaurant in New York, U.S.

- Interactive map of La Bastide by Andrea Calstier

Restaurant information
- Food type: French
- Rating: (Michelin Guide)
- Location: 721 Titicus Road, North Salem, New York, 10560, United States
- Coordinates: 41°20′13″N 73°33′48″W

La Bastide by Andrea Calstier is a Michelin-starred French restaurant in the U.S. state of New York.

== See also ==
- List of French restaurants
- List of Michelin-starred restaurants in New York City
