= Restaurant Marché =

Defunct restaurant on Bainbridge Island, Washington, U.S.

- Interactive map of Restaurant Marché

Restaurant information
- Coordinates: 47.6254°N 122.5195°W
- Website: restaurantmarchebainbridge.com

Restaurant Marché was a restaurant on Bainbridge Island, Washington, United States. Owners Greg and Betsy Atkinson opened the French bistro in 2012. The business closed permanently in June 2025.

== See also ==
- List of defunct restaurants of the United States
- List of French restaurants
