= Mélisse =

French restaurant in Santa Monica, California, U.S.

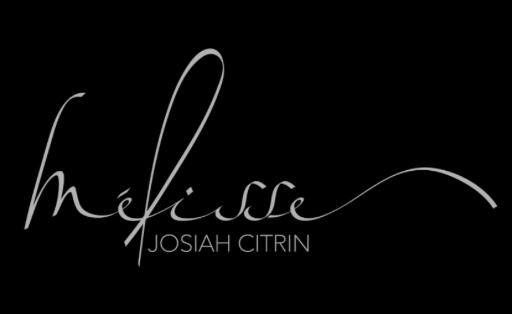
- Interactive map of Mélisse

Restaurant information
- Established: 1999; 27 years ago
- Owner: Josiah Citrin
- Head chef: Josiah Citrin
- Chef: Ken Takayama
- Food type: French
- Rating: (Michelin Guide)
- Location: 1104 Wilshire Boulevard, Santa Monica, California, 90401, United States
- Coordinates: 34°1′27.7″N 118°29′28.4″W
- Seating capacity: 14
- Other information: $400 10-course tasting menu
- Website: www.citrinandmelisse.com

Mélisse is a Michelin-starred French restaurant in Santa Monica, California.

== History ==
The restaurant was established in 1999.

Mélisse is located in the same building as its sister restaurant, Citrin.

== See also ==
- Citrin
- List of French restaurants
- List of Michelin-starred restaurants in California
