= La Bise (restaurant) =

French restaurant in Washington, D.C., U.S.

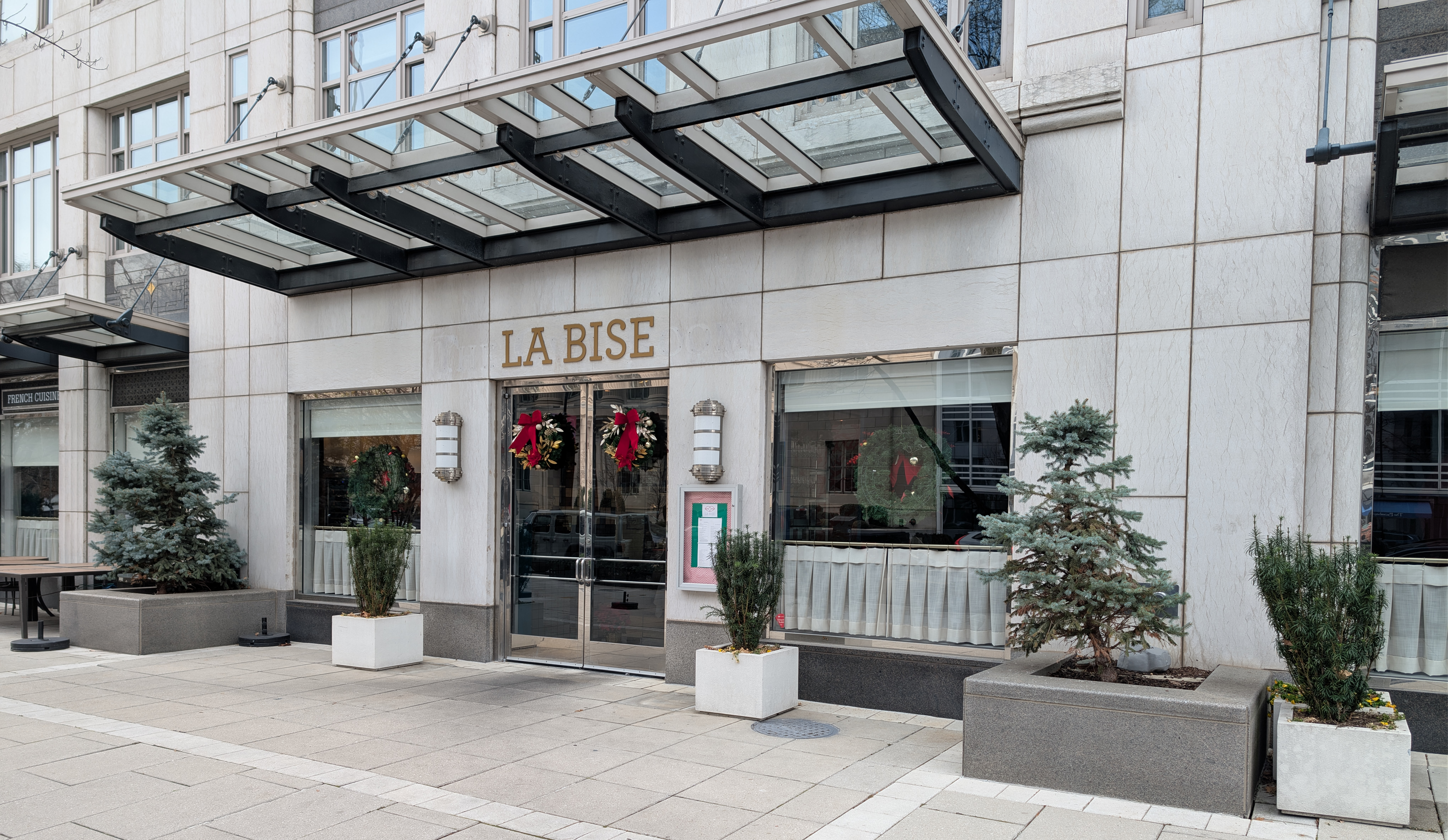
- The restaurant's exterior, 2025
- Interactive map of La Bise

Restaurant information
- Food type: French
- Location: 800 Connecticut Avenue NW, Washington, D.C., 20006, United States
- Coordinates: 38°54′1.7″N 77°2′18.7″W

La Bise is a French restaurant in Washington, D.C., United States. Tyler Stout is the executive chef. The menu has included steak tartare, Rohan duck breast, black truffle risotto, and Maine lobster with pineapple.

== See also ==
- List of French restaurants
