= Volunteer Park Cafe & Pantry =

Restaurant in Seattle, Washington, U.S.

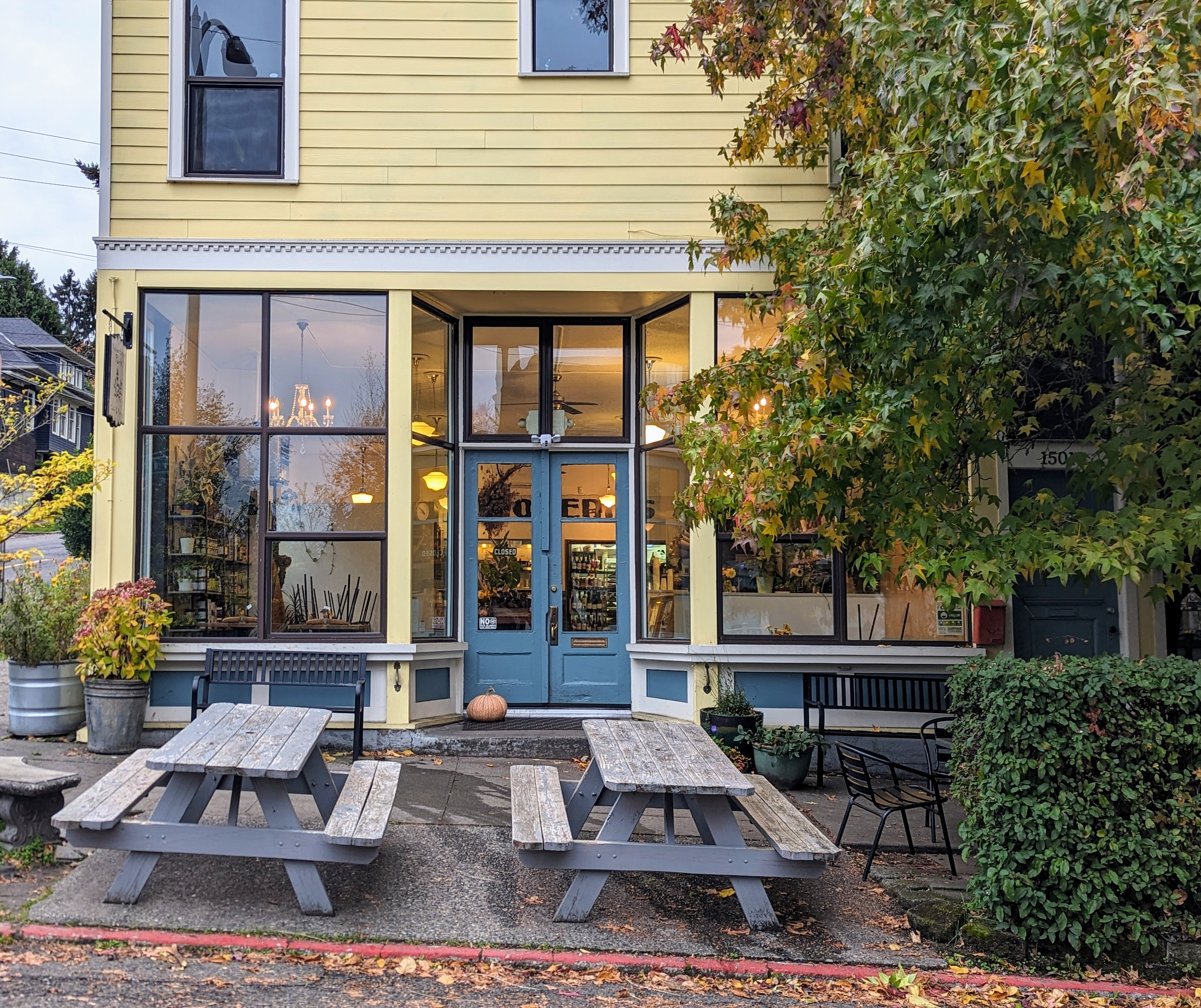
- The restaurant's exterior in 2023
- Interactive map of Volunteer Park Cafe & Pantry

Restaurant information
- Location: Seattle, Washington, United States
- Coordinates: 47°37′56.8″N 122°18′36.3″W

Volunteer Park Cafe & Pantry (VPC) is a restaurant in Seattle, in the U.S. state of Washington. Housed in a 1900s building that previously operated as a convenience store, the business is owned by James DeSarno. Previously, Ericka Burke was the owner.

== Description ==
Volunteer Park Cafe & Pantry (VPC) is a restaurant operating from a small yellow house at the intersection of 17th Avenue East and Galer Street in Seattle's Capitol Hill neighborhood. Eater Seattle has described the business as a "hybrid coffee shop, bottleshop, and corner market".

Thrillist says, "VPC is slinging great pies daily, as well as refreshing libations and a stellar hangover-cure style brunch." The New York Times has described VPC as "cozy".

The menu has included avocado toast with za’atar, egg and cheese sandwiches, matzo ball soup, and Israeli couscous salad, and the pantry has stocked preserved blueberries, vegan chocolate, and canned tomatoes. VPC has also served cakes, cookies, and other rotating seasonal pastries.

== History ==
VPC is housed in a c. 1904 building that previously operated as a convenience store. The restaurant closed in 2020, before reopening in 2021 under a new owner James DeSarno, a local architect and vintner. VPC is overseen by pastry chef Crystal Chiu and manager Melissa Johnson.

== Reception ==
Allecia Vermillion included the business in Seattle Metropolitan's 2022 list of "exceptional" breakfast sandwiches. Emma Banks and Bradley Foster included VPC in Thrillist's 2022 list of "The Absolute Best Brunches in Seattle Right Now".
