= Lac de Bise =

Lake in France

- Location within France
- Location: La Chapelle-d'Abondance, Haute-Savoie
- Coordinates: 46°19′45″N 6°45′52″E
- Basin countries: France
- Max. length: 300 m (980 ft)
- Max. width: 150 m (490 ft)
- Surface area: 32 ha (79 acres)
- Max. depth: 1.2 m (3 ft 11 in)
- Water volume: 8,000 m^{3} (280,000 cu ft)
- Surface elevation: 1,502 m (4,928 ft)
- Islands: 0

Lac de Bise is a lake in Haute-Savoie, France. It is located within the commune of La Chapelle-d'Abondance, in the French Chablais, east of the Cornettes de Bise.

== See also ==
- List of lakes of France
