= Richard Chen =

Richard Chen is the current executive chef at Chyna Club, a Chinese restaurant inside Fontainebleau Las Vegas and the former executive chef of Wing Lei, a Chinese restaurant inside Wynn Las Vegas.

== Early life and education ==
Chen was introduced to catering at the age of seven by his parents who ran a restaurant in Taiwan. The family moved to the United States and re-established a new restaurant in suburban Chicago where Richard continued assisting them. Chen graduated at the Culinary Institute of America in Hyde Park, New York.

== Career ==
In 1986 he was appointed chef at the La Vista International Hotel (which was in December 1995 renamed as Marriott World Trade Center).

He then returned to Chicago to become a chef in Euro-French cuisine at the Ritz-Carlton Chicago.

In 2002, Chen became Chef de Cuisine and manager of the fusion restaurant Shanghai Terrace at The Peninsula Chicago. Chicago magazine named it as one of its "Best New Restaurants" in 2002 and Zagat listed it in the "Top Food, Service and Décor" category.

While at the Shanghai Terrace, Chen also became executive chef of Wing Lei starting April 28, 2005 after an extensive recruitment campaign by Steve Wynn himself. The 2008 Las Vegas Michelin Guide awarded it one star, making it the only Chinese restaurant in North America to have earned the honor. It has also received the 2008 AAA Four Diamond award. The name Wing Lei is derived from the translation of the Chinese character for Wynn and means "forever prosperous".

Chen married Cathy Yee in the summer of 2006. Cathy owns the Chinese restaurant Ya Fei in the Robinson neighborhood in Pittsburgh. Kathy herself was named Pittsburgh Magazine's Restaurateur of the Year.

Chen then opened his contemporary Chinese restaurant, Richard Chen Pan Asian Cuisine, on August 1, 2008, in the recently re-identified Eastside development in East Liberty neighborhood of Pittsburgh with executive chef Simon Lewis and general manager Alec Chipman and co-owner and wife Cathy Chen. It featured upscale dining for Pan-Asian cuisine in a fusion-inspired interior. EDGEstudio from Pittsburgh's Garfield neighborhood designed the 120 seat, 4,600-square-foot (430 m^{2}) interior. In its short 9 months of operations, it became locally favoured and was a semi-finalist for best new restaurant for the 2009 James Beard Foundation Award. It temporarily closed April 29, 2009 and permanently closed on April 30, 2009, citing economic concerns. A pan-Asian restaurant has opened in the space. Pittsburgh Magazine readers voted it the 2009 "Worst Loss to the Local Dining Scene".

In May 2011, Chen left Wing Lei to start Kushi Yama in Amarillo, Texas.

Chen has repeatedly explained to various interviewers how his French influenced light Chinese plates, which require impeccable technique in the making, differ so evidently from popular Chinese take-out food.
