= Awakening (Wynn Las Vegas show) =

Las Vegas stage production at the Wynn

- Genre: Contemporary pop theater
- Show type: Resident show
- Date of premiere: November 7, 2022
- Final show: October 10, 2026

Creative team
- Executive Producer: Bernie Yuman
- Producer and Director: Baz Halpin
- Producer and Character Designer: Michael Curry
- Producer for Wynn: Rick Gray
- Writer: Kelly Sue DeConnick
- Composer: Brian Tyler
- Composer (water and air): Kris Pooley
- Production Designer: George Tsypin
- Costume Designer: Soyon An
- Lighting Designers: Jules Fisher; Peggy Eisenhauer
- Sound Designer: Peter Hylenski
- Illusion Designer: Paul Kieve
- Screen Graphics Director: Tom Colbourne
- Choreographers: Mandy Moore; Phillip Chbeeb; Kevin “Konkrete” Davis Jr. Tracy Phillips; Alex Suarez; Zoi Tatopoulos
- Supervising Choreographer: Nolan Padilla
- Official website

Awakening was a marquee theater production at Wynn Las Vegas. The final performance was on October 10th, 2026. It was set in a 360-degree theater and includes illusions, music, dance and puppetry. It replaced Wynn’s long-running show, La Rêve, following five years of development and $120 million in production cost, including a custom-built 60-foot stage for theater in the round, with custom LED screens built into the stage. The show’s recorded narration was provided by Academy Award winner Anthony Hopkins and was led by producers Baz Halpin, Bernie Yuman and Michael Curry.

== Development ==
The show followed La Rêve as Wynn’s marquee show in Las Vegas. It launched following “extensive” renovations to the Awakening Theater at Wynn that include a glass stage and custom LED screens. At a $120 million investment, the show is the single most expensive production put on by Wynn. Producer Baz Halpin, who also worked on Usher’s Super Bowl halftime and the Taylor Swift Eras Tour, described the team’s goal as to create the "most technologically advanced show on the Strip."

According to the show’s creators, Awakening was an 80-minute show that “tells the epic tale of IO, a reluctant hero” who "braves the trials of unique worlds on her quest to reunite Light and Darkness." The show was set in a 360-degree theater in the round with dichroic glass and embedded lights and screens, resulting in a "kaleidoscope of light" effect. Each of the 1,600 seats has individual stereo speakers, for a total of 3,200 speakers of surround sound.

Awakening featured a cast of 60 artists, with a total of more than 300 costumes inspired by haute couture. It was produced by Baz Halpin, Bernie Yuman and Michael Curry in a team with "multiple Emmy and Tony award winners." Choreographers included Mandy Moore, Phillip Chbeeb, Kevin Davis Jr., Tracy Phillips, Alex Suarez, Zoi Tatopoulos and supervising choreographer Nolan Padilla.

The original score was created by Emmy-nominated composer Brian Tyler. The score included music inspired by electronica, hip hop, reggaeton and dancehall. It was played through a system that includes two speakers at each of the 1,600 seats in the theater, for a total of over 3,200 speakers.

Animatronics, including large-scale puppetry, were designed by Michael Curry. The show included "elaborate, oversized pieces" of puppetry, including "a larger-than-life whale floating through the air."

The show’s producers claimed that the show incorporated at least three "illusion techniques" "that have never been seen before."

In 2024, Halpin invited Mandy Moore to refresh the show following their joint work on the Eras Tour.

== Reception ==
The USA Today said that Awakening’s "producers set out to make a show that was unlike anything else in Las Vegas." The Las Vegas Review Journal’s initial review called the show "powerful" and noted that the dancers "impressively mix traditional styles with the show’s powerful light-and-sound technology." A separate review called it "lavish, ambitious and adventurous." The Las Vegas Sun called it "next bar-setting Las Vegas entertainment spectacle."

The show was named "Best Production Show" by the Southern Nevada Hotel Concierge Association. It was also named “one of the best Vegas shows” by US News and Travel and Leisure.
