= Alessandro Stratta =

American celebrity chef and restauranteur (born 1964)

- Born: October 29, 1964 (age 62); Marquette, Wisconsin
- Education: California Culinary Academy
- Culinary career
- Cooking style: French, Mediterranean, and Italian
- Current restaurant
- Prado (Scottsdale)

Alessandro Stratta (born October 29, 1964) is an American celebrity chef and restaurateur. Stratta played the role of Iron Chef Italian on the television show Iron Chef USA. He was the recipient of the James Beard Foundation award for Best Chef Southwest in 1998 and was executive chef and owner of his famous namesake restaurant, Alex, in Las Vegas until its closure on January 15, 2011. He was later diagnosed with colon cancer and became a cancer survivor. He was the executive chef and owner of "Tapas by Alex Stratta" in the Las Vegas suburb of Summerlin, until it closed in 2015. In 2016, Stratta became executive chef de cuisine at Prado restaurant at the Omni Hotel in Paradise Valley, Arizona.

== Biography ==
=== Early life ===
Stratta is a fourth-generation hotelier born to parents from locales well known for their culinary traditions; his Italian father is from the Piedmont region, and his French mother from Nice along the Côte d'Azur. As his father was president of Princess Hotels & Resorts, he spent much of his early life living in luxurious resorts in countries all over the world, including Singapore, Malaysia, Italy, France, Mexico, and Pakistan; this upbringing helped him become fluent in French, Italian, Spanish, and English. Stratta attended the California Culinary Academy in San Francisco, California and graduated with honors in 1983.

=== Culinary development ===
Stratta began his career as a patissier-in-training at the Stanford Court Hotel. He then accepted an internship at the Hôtel de Paris in Monaco; soon after, Alain Ducasse invited Stratta to join the team at his Louis XV restaurant there. After two years, Stratta returned to the United States, and at Ducasse's recommendation began working for Daniel Boulud at Le Cirque in New York City. Both Ducasse and Boulud acted as mentors who heavily influenced Stratta's development as both a chef and restaurateur; Stratta credits Ducasse with showing him "how to make basic, simple food taste phenomenal", and Boulud for his creative influences as well as business skills.

=== As executive chef ===
In 1989, Stratta took on the executive chef position at Mary Elaine's restaurant at The Phoenician resort in Scottsdale, Arizona. While there, he was featured in Food & Wine Magazine as one of "America's Ten Best New Chefs". Under his tenure, the restaurant earned a 4-star rating from the Mobil Travel Guide and also received critical acclaim as the best restaurant in the Phoenix area.

In 1998, Stratta became executive chef of the Renoir restaurant at The Mirage in Las Vegas after being invited by Steve Wynn. The restaurant earned Mobil Travel Guide's highest rating of 5 stars just six months after opening.

In 2005, Stratta opened his namesake restaurant Alex – once again at the invitation of Steve Wynn, but this time for the grand opening of Wynn's namesake casino resort and country club, Wynn Las Vegas. Stratta's restaurant was billed as a "triumph" and has been extremely well reviewed; it received ratings of 5 stars from the Mobil Travel Guide, 5 diamonds from the AAA Restaurant Ratings, and 2 stars from the Michelin Guide.

In 2025, he joined Belmont Kitchen & Cocktails in Scottsdale, Arizona as executive chef.

=== Television ===
In 2001, Stratta was chosen as Iron Chef Italian on the now-defunct television show Iron Chef USA, where he was nicknamed the "Italian Scallion". Although he describes himself as "not that competitive", Stratta decided to appear on the show because he is a fan of the original Iron Chef show from Japan. In his only battle appearance on the show, he defeated chef Marcus Samuelsson. On March 2, 2011, it was announced that Stratta would be one of the contestants competing in the third season of Bravo's reality competition show Top Chef Masters. He was eliminated during the sixth episode, placing seventh in the competition.

== Awards ==
- America's Ten Best New Chefs, Food & Wine Magazine, 1994
- Best Chef Southwest, James Beard Foundation, 1998
- Two Stars Michelin Guide for Alex
- AAA Five Diamond Award for Alex
- Five Stars Mobil Travel Guide for Alex
- Gaming Hall of Fame 2006 Inductee

== Restaurants ==
- Alex at Wynn Las Vegas (Las Vegas)
- Stratta at Wynn Las Vegas (Las Vegas)
- Tapas by Alex Stratta (Las Vegas)
- Prado at Omni Scottsdale Resort & Spa at Montelucia (Scottsdale)
- Salt & Pepper at Tivoli Village (Las Vegas)
- Belmont Kitchen & Cocktails Scottsdale, Az
