= Mizumi =

Coordinates: 36.1268688°N 115.169954°W

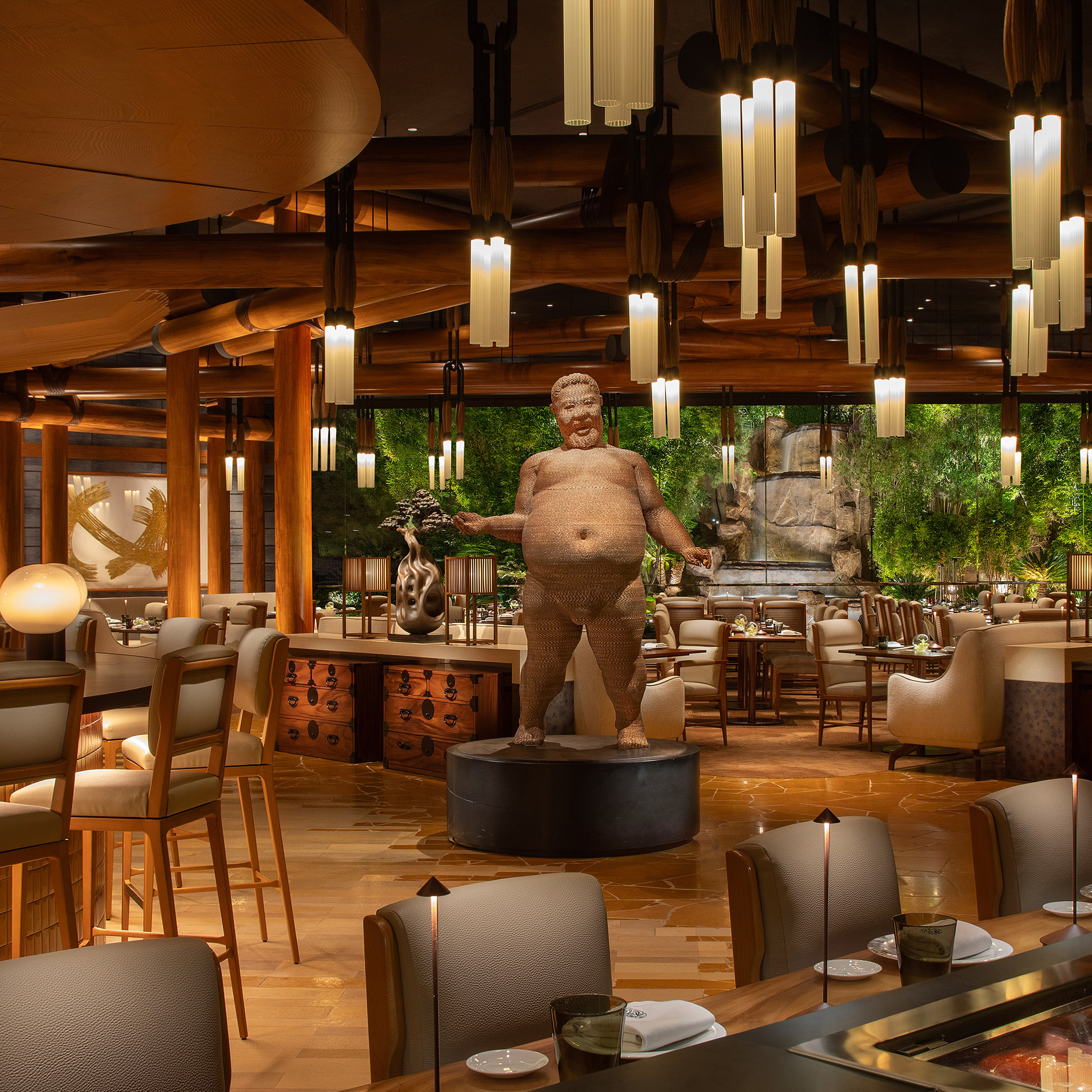
- Interactive map of Mizumi

Restaurant information
- Established: 2006
- Rating: (Macau location)
- Location: 3131 Las Vegas Blvd S, Las Vegas, Clark County, Nevada, Nevada, 89109, United States
- Website: www.wynnlasvegas.com/dining/fine-dining/mizumi

Mizumi is a Japanese fine dining restaurant within Wynn Macau and Wynn Las Vegas on the Las Vegas Strip. Mizumi serves "freshly sourced Japanese ingredients presented creatively as tempura, teppanyaki and sushi."

There is also a Michelin-starred Mizumi location at the Wynn Palace Cotai. Jeff Ramsey serves as executive chef of the Las Vegas location and executive chef Hironori Maeda helms the Wynn Palace location.

== History ==
The first Mizumi opened in Wynn Macau in 2006. The second Mizumi location opened at Wynn Las Vegas in the former space of Okada on May 4, 2012 under the leadership of executive chef Devin Hashimoto. The restaurant was later headed by executive chef Min Kim.

The Las Vegas Mizumi restaurant was extensively renovated in 2023 to install "dramatic teak beams and traditional Japanese wood joinery, deep indigo blue, lantern lighting, and natural stone floors."

Following the renovation, Jeff Ramsey was named executive chef. Jeff Ramsey previously opened Kintsugi in 2019, which was named a Michelin-selected restaurant in 2022 and 2023. Ramsey competed and won as a challenger on Iron Chef Thailand in 2022.

== Cuisine ==
According to Eater Las Vegas, the menu is known for "selections of nigiri; chilled Pacific oysters; chawanmushi egg custard with uni, caviar, and black truffle; and A5 wagyu beef fried rice." It additionally notes a "robatayaki grill offers black tiger shrimp with lemon, lamb chops with maple miso butter, and chicken yakitori."

Mizumi and its fellow Wynn restaurant SW Steakhouse are the only restaurants in the Las Vegas area with a license to serve the rare Hokkaido snow beef.

According to Condé Nast, the restaurant offers one of the most premium sake selections available, heavily featuring Junmai Daiginjo sakes. Japanese sake maker Dassai debuted three varieties of sake at Mizumi.

== Reception ==
Conde Nest described the Las Vegas restaurant as offering "some of the most prized cuisine in Las Vegas in a romantic, magical environment." Mizumi has been named among the best sushi restaurants in Las Vegas, the best Japanese restaurants in Las Vegas, top Las Vegas luxury experiences, and it was also called one of the best restaurants with a waterfront view in Las Vegas. Forbes highlighted the sake program as a standout in Las Vegas, particularly the nine-course sake-pairing omakase program.

Mizumi in the Wynn Palace, Macau received one Michelin star. The original Macau location received two Michelin stars in 2018 through 2023; Michelin does not currently publish a guide to Las Vegas restaurants so no Las Vegas restaurants are currently eligible for recognition. The Wynn Palace Macau location of Mizumi has been named one of the “top 100 tables” in the world, as well as being named to the Forbes Travel Guide star rating list.

== See also ==
- List of Michelin-starred restaurants in Hong Kong and Macau
- List of restaurants in the Las Vegas Valley
