= Delilah (restaurant) =

American restaurant group

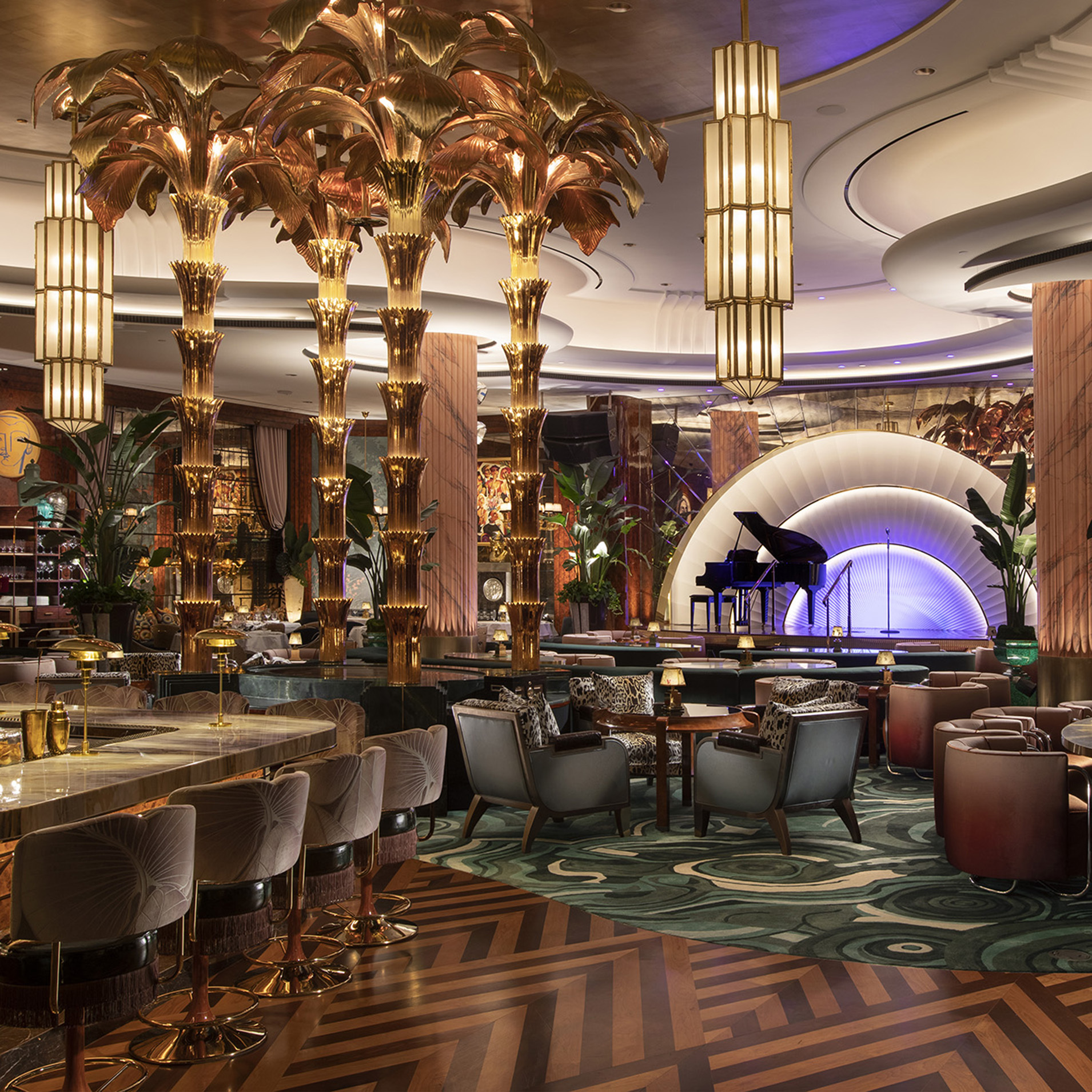
- Delilah at Wynn Las Vegas
- Company type: Private
- Genre: Supper club
- Founded: 2016, West Hollywood
- Number of locations: West Hollywood, Miami, Las Vegas
- Area served: United States
- Website: https://www.delilahrestaurants.com/

Delilah is an upscale "modern supper club" with locations in West Hollywood, Miami, and within Wynn Las Vegas on the Las Vegas Strip. It was developed by h.wood Group, and in the case of the Las Vegas location, co-developed by Wynn Resorts and h.wood Group.

An international outpost of Delilah has been announced for Wynn Al Marjan Island, in Ras Al Khaimah, UAE, and is scheduled to open with the resort in 2027.

== History ==
The Las Vegas restaurant opened in 2021 as one of the “most anticipated” restaurants in the Las Vegas valley with a “heightened feeling of extravagance” relative to other Delilah locations. The on-Strip location inside Wynn was described in reviews as "channel[ing] the opulent jazz cabaret-dining rooms of a bygone era like L.A.'s Cocoanut Grove, Vegas' Copa Room and Havana's Tropicana Club".

The restaurant group is named after a fictional "Delilah," who represents the spirit of the restaurant. Todd-Avery Lenahan, of Wynn Design & Development and designer of the Wynn location, noted that the design inspiration for the Las Vegas "Delilah" was "part Rita Hayworth, part Lucille ball, all showgirl."

Delilah is known for its "no photos" policy, which has been lifted only for special events, such as the Las Vegas Grand Prix after-party at Wynn and the Philadelphia Eagles' Super Bowl victory party, also at Wynn on the Las Vegas Strip.

== Cuisine ==
Delilah features American food, and is noted for being "heavy on steak and seafood." The beef Wellington for two and late-night menu options are noted in reviews. Other reviewers note the "slutty brownie" dessert, named after Kendall Jenner, the carrot soufflé with candied cornflakes, and the "perfect mimolette fondue macaroni gratinee." The Las Vegas location offers a signature caviar service as well.

In Las Vegas, Delilah at Wynn is unique in offering an "elaborate" Saturday brunch service with live music. Reviews mention rich brunch foods such as thick-cut brioche French toast with berries and mascarpone and an omelet topped with caviar.

== Reception ==
The Las Vegas location has been reviewed as making visitors "feel like you've been transported back to the 1950s and to the glitz and glamour of early Las Vegas showrooms and nightclubs." Condé Nast Traveler called it "one of the top 25 best restaurants in Las Vegas", while it was also called "one of the hardest tables to book" in Las Vegas.
