= Wynn Las Vegas =

Hotel and casino in Paradise, Nevada, US

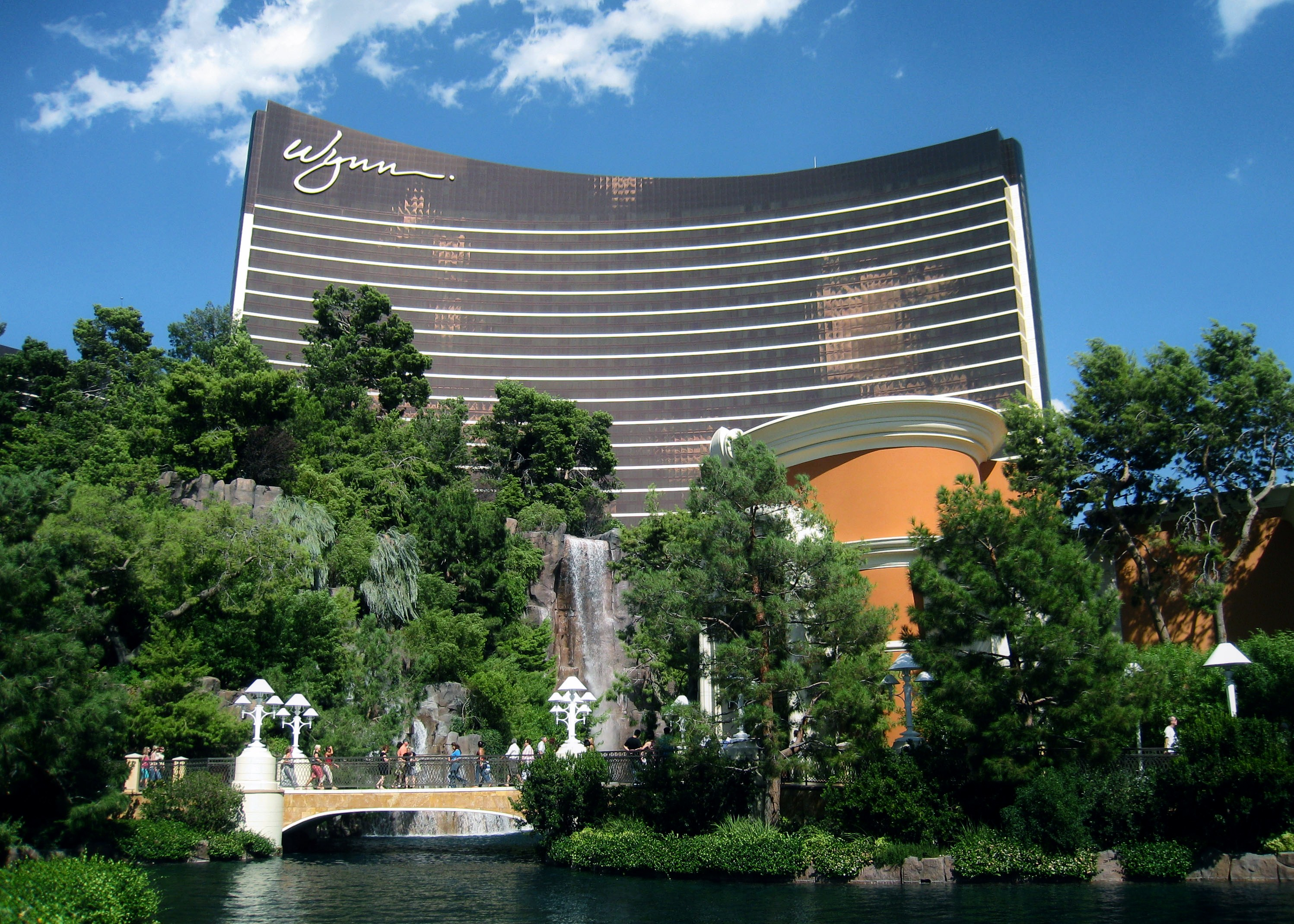

- Location within Las Vegas Strip Location within Nevada
- Interactive map of Wynn Las Vegas
- Location: Paradise, Nevada, U.S.; 3131 South Las Vegas Boulevard; 36°07′43″N 115°9′59″W
- Opened: April 28, 2005; 21 years ago
- No. of rooms: 2,716
- Gaming space: 111,000 sq ft (10,300 m^{2})
- Permanent shows: Le Rêve (2005–2020); Awakening; Lake of Dreams
- Signature attractions: Wynn Golf Club
- Notable restaurants: The Buffet at Wynn; Cipriani; Delilah; Four Sixes Ranch Steakhouse; Mizumi; Pisces; SW Steakhouse; Wing Lei
- Casino type: Land-based
- Owner: Wynn Resorts
- Renovated in: 2011, 2022
- Website: wynnlasvegas.com

Wynn Las Vegas, often simply referred to as Wynn, is a luxury resort and casino located on the Las Vegas Strip in Paradise, Nevada, United States. It is owned and operated by Wynn Resorts, and was built on the former site of the Desert Inn resort, which opened in 1950. Casino developer Steve Wynn purchased and closed the Desert Inn during 2000, with plans to build a new resort on the site. The design phase lasted two and a half years, and construction began on October 31, 2002, with Marnell Corrao Associates as general contractor. At a cost of $2.7 billion, Wynn Las Vegas was the most expensive resort ever built, beating Wynn's $1.6 billion Bellagio, which opened on the Strip in 1998.

Wynn Las Vegas opened on April 28, 2005, with 2,716 rooms and a 111,000 sq ft (10,300 m^{2}) casino. At the time, its 45-story hotel tower was the tallest building in Nevada. A sister property, Encore Las Vegas, was opened by Wynn Resorts in December 2008. Located directly north of the resort, Encore added a second hotel tower and additional gaming space, as well as several restaurants and clubs. In total, the 215-acre (87 ha) Wynn complex contains 4,748 rooms and 188,786 sq ft (17,538.8 m^{2}) of gaming space. Wynn declared his $5.2 billion complex finished in May 2010, following additions made at Encore.

Unlike most Strip resorts, the Wynn does not feature a theme. In a break from Wynn's previous resorts, it also lacks a free attraction for pedestrians. Instead, an artificial mountain obscures most of the attractions, meant to evoke curiosity and lure people into the resort. A 3-acre (1.2 ha) lake is surrounded by the mountain and several restaurants, and is the site of a show called Lake of Dreams, which features singing animatronics.

The Desert Inn's golf course was kept and redesigned to become the Wynn's course. Upon opening, the resort also included the state's only Ferrari and Maserati dealership, which later closed in 2015. The property has two shopping areas, Wynn Esplanade and Wynn Plaza, the latter replacing the dealership in 2018. Tryst, a popular nightclub by Victor Drai, opened in 2005 and operated for 10 years.

Since its opening, Wynn Las Vegas has received numerous accolades, including the AAA Five Diamond Award and the Five Star award from Forbes Travel Guide. The accolades also extend to its restaurants, including Alex, a French eatery by chef Alex Stratta which eventually closed in 2011. Another restaurant, Wing Lei, is the first Chinese restaurant in the U.S. to receive a Michelin Star. Other popular restaurants include The Buffet at Wynn, Sartino's, Mizumi, Pisces and Delilah, among others.

The resort's main show was Le Rêve, which opened with the property in 2005. It had a successful run in the Wynn Theater before closing in 2020, due to the COVID-19 pandemic. The show was replaced by Awakening, after extensive renovations to the theater.

A second venue, the Broadway Theater, was also built with the resort. It was later renamed the Encore Theater, after the sister resort property, and is now situated between the two resorts. The Encore Theater has hosted numerous shows, including Avenue Q and Spamalot, as well as entertainers such as Beyoncé, Danny Gans, and Garth Brooks.

In 2006, table game dealers at the resort protested a new policy requiring them to share tips with their supervisors. The policy sparked years of litigation between Wynn and the dealers, with a $5.6 million settlement eventually reached in 2021.

== History ==
Wynn Las Vegas was built on the former site of the Desert Inn, a casino resort which opened in 1950. Local developer Steve Wynn purchased the resort in 2000, as a birthday present for wife Elaine Wynn. Wynn had recently sold his company, Mirage Resorts, and used the money to buy the Desert Inn. The resort was closed later that year, with plans to build a new one in its place. Wynn partnered with businessman Kazuo Okada and his company Aruze, which would help finance the project. In August 2001, Wynn unveiled specific plans for the project, which would retain the Desert Inn's golf course. The resort was expected to open sometime in 2004. Wynn expected it to compete against his former Bellagio resort, which he had recently sold along with Mirage Resorts.

=== Name ===
Wynn announced the resort's initial name, "Le Rêve" (French for "The Dream"), in October 2001. It was named after a 1932 Picasso painting that Wynn had purchased. Wynn trademarked the "Le Rêve" name earlier in 2001, and later purchased the rights from the Le Rêve hotel in West Hollywood, California.

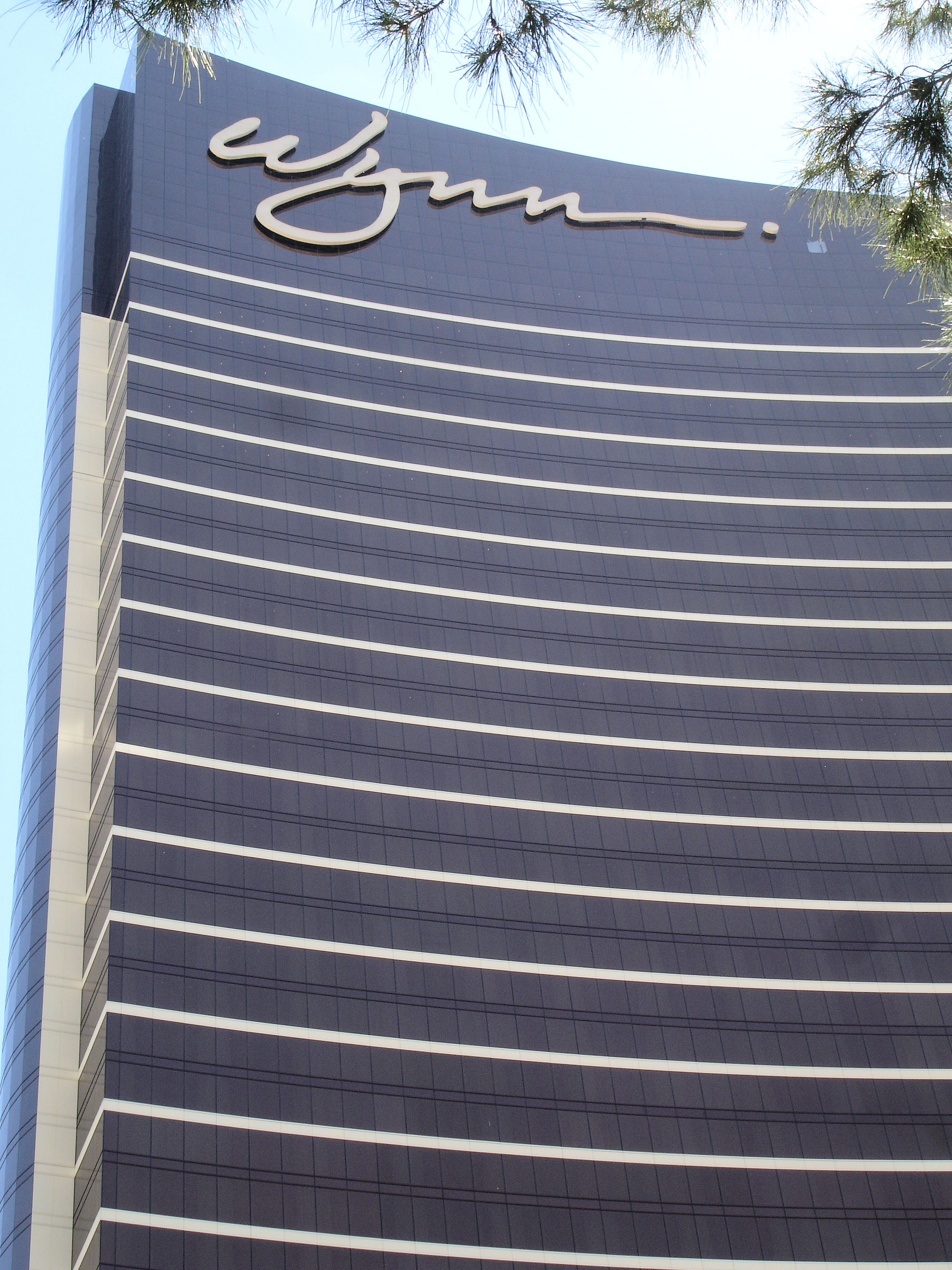
Wynn tower signage

In June 2003, Wynn announced that he had renamed the resort after himself; market research showed that "Wynn" had better name recognition. According to Wynn: "No one knows what Le Reve is. No one knows how to pronounce it". "Wynn" was once considered as a name for his previous resorts, The Mirage and Bellagio. By the time of the name change, he was already planning to build the Wynn Macau resort in China, and said, "Others have finally convinced me that the Wynn name would allow us to cross-market and offer a consistency of branding for all our properties". Three individuals in particular helped convince him to change the name: businessmen Barry Diller, Donald Trump, and film director Steven Spielberg.

France was opposed to the 2003 invasion of Iraq, and this was also a reason for changing the resort's name. According to chief architect DeRuyter Butler: "The name Le Reve is very closely tied to France, which was an opponent to our political approach to Iraq. It wasn't anything derogatory toward France, but Mr. Wynn started to look at other potential names".

Wynn's surname signature is used as the resort's logo, and is present in illuminated lettering along the top of the hotel tower. The logo ends with a period punctuation mark. According to longtime local reporter Steve Friess, the resort "screamed Wynn Period as if to say, 'This is the Wynn. Period.' Wynn once told me as much, explaining it was a subtle way of saying that this is the definition of his embodiment as a resort, the ultimate". In a 2005 commercial, Wynn himself promoted the resort as "the only one I've ever signed my name to".

=== Financing and construction ===
The Desert Inn's Augusta Tower was imploded in October 2001, and construction on the new resort was scheduled to begin two months later. However, this was delayed by complications in excavating the former site of the Augusta Tower. The resort was expected to cost $1.6 billion, and the start of construction was further delayed by difficulty acquiring funds.

By June 2002, the project cost had increased to $1.8 billion. This would make it the most expensive casino resort in the world, topping Wynn's $1.6 billion Bellagio. Wynn announced that the project would be partly financed by bank loans and Aruze, in addition to an initial public offering (IPO) in Wynn Resorts. Wynn had previously wanted to retain private ownership and dismissed the idea of selling stock to raise financing. Wynn Resorts hoped to raise $470 million through the IPO, selling one-third of its shares; the remainder would be held by Wynn himself and Aruze. Ahead of the IPO launch, Wynn traveled around the U.S. to pitch his plans, spending three weeks on the road. Investors were apprehensive about the project because of the lengthy construction schedule ahead. In response, Wynn Resorts reduced the share price to attract investors.

Marnell Corrao Associates, which built Wynn's previous resorts, was hired as general contractor. Groundbreaking took place on October 31, 2002, with a ceremony attended by hundreds of people, including Nevada senators Harry Reid and John Ensign, and former governor Bob Miller. As of June 2003, construction proceeded on a 24-hour schedule, with rebar installation during the day and concrete pours at night. The tower was topped off in February 2004. As project costs increased, another stock offering in Wynn Resorts took place later that year to raise additional financing. Hiring began on November 1, 2004. Within three months, more than 80,000 people applied for jobs at the resort, which would employ 9,000. In total, the resort received 105,000 applications.

As of January 2005, construction crews were working on a 20-hour schedule each day to get the resort finished on time. At a final cost of $2.7 billion, it was the most expensive resort ever built. Analysts anticipated that Wynn Las Vegas would launch a new wave of resort construction on the Strip. The resort was also expected to help transform the northern Strip and attract an upper-class clientele to the area. Several new Strip projects were announced during Wynn's construction, including The Palazzo, CityCenter, Fontainebleau, and Echelon Place.

=== Opening and operation ===
Wynn kept many details about the project secretive until its opening, granting few interviews prior to that point. He said the resort's features were difficult to describe: "That's the reason there hasn't been a lot of chatter about the hotel. It's not because we're trying to keep a secret. This is a place that does not lend itself to verbalization. So, when you start to describe them, you resort to strained attempts to communicate something no one has seen". As the opening approached, Wynn appeared in a commercial promoting the new resort, in which he is shown on the roof of the hotel tower. The advertisement aired during Super Bowl XXXIX in February 2005, and was subsequently broadcast in Phoenix, San Diego, and Los Angeles.

Wynn Las Vegas opened at 12:01 a.m. on April 28, 2005, Elaine's birthday. It was the first new resort to open on the Strip since the Aladdin in 2000. The public opening was preceded by a private charity fundraiser reception for approximately 2,000 guests. An estimated 10,000 people attended the public opening. The resort marked Wynn's return to the Nevada gaming industry, five years after selling Mirage Resorts.

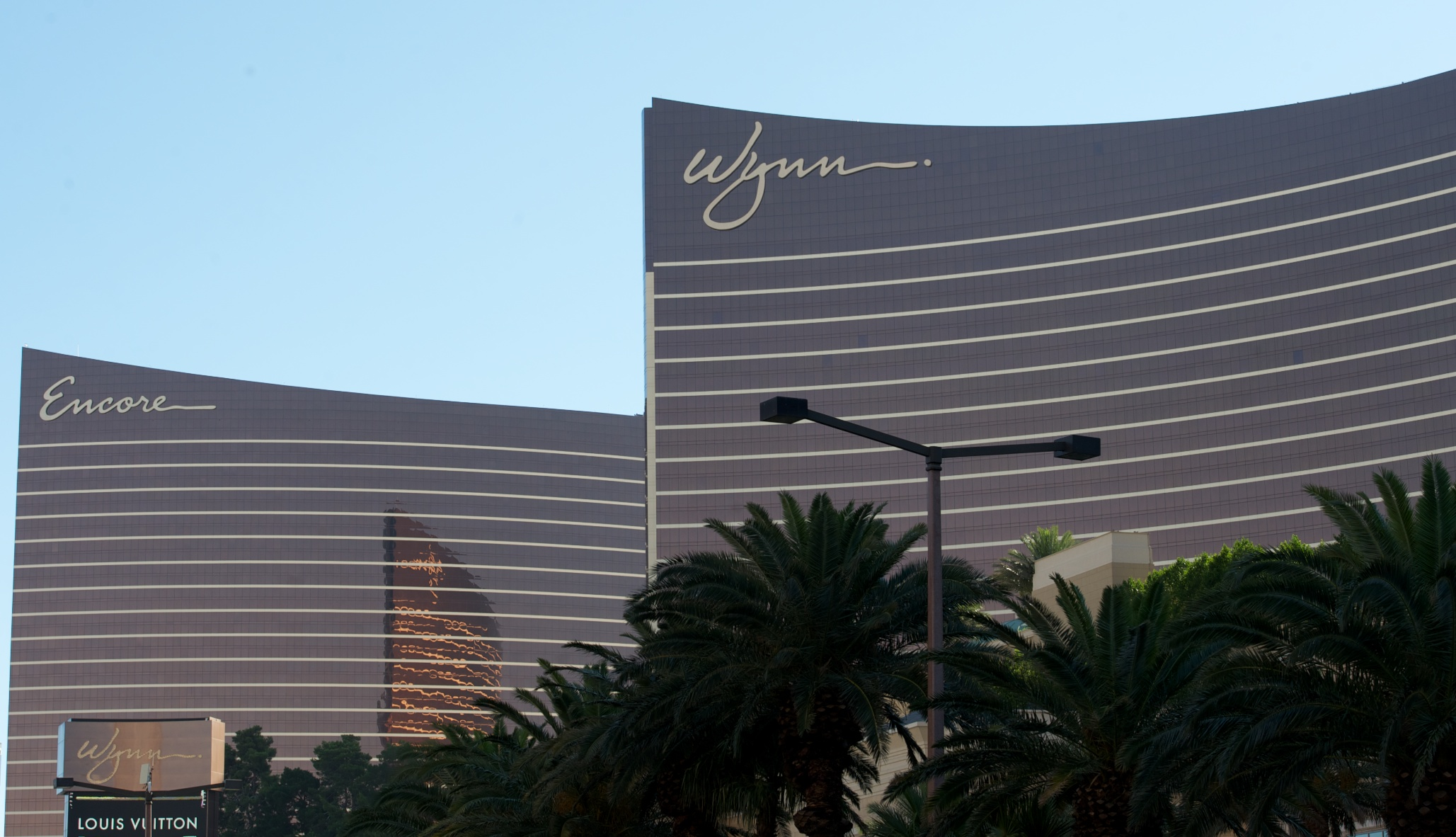
Encore and Wynn hotel towers

Within the first year, changes were made to several resort amenities as part of a fine-tuning effort. A second hotel resort, Encore Las Vegas, was built as a sister property. It opened directly north of Wynn Las Vegas in December 2008, occupying the remainder of the Desert Inn site. Additions were made to Encore in May 2010, at which point Wynn declared the completion of the $5.2 billion Wynn complex. A $99 million renovation of the Wynn hotel was completed in 2011.

In 2013, Wynn tapped Sean Christie to attract film productions to the resort. Christie, who oversaw several nightclubs on the property, put together a team and spent six months promoting the resort for film purposes. Wynn Las Vegas made its feature debut in 2015, with the release of two films: Paul Blart: Mall Cop 2 was shot throughout the resort, while The Squeeze filmed on the golf course. The resort made subsequent appearances in the films Frank & Lola (2016) and The House (2017). By 2017, Wynn Las Vegas had become one of the world's most photographed hotels among the general public.

In March 2020, the Wynn properties were among the first Las Vegas resorts to close as the COVID-19 pandemic reached Nevada. The Wynn complex, along with other local resorts, reopened three months later. In contrast to most other resorts, the Wynn properties reopened with all amenities allowed under state health guidelines. Air travel saw a reduction in the early months of the pandemic, and the Wynn resorts relied largely on drive-in tourists from Arizona and California. However, visitation soon declined after both states endured a surge in COVID-19 cases. Wynn Resorts reduced its work force, and Encore temporarily shifted to a four-day weekly operating schedule. As revenue improved in 2021, a $200 million renovation of the two hotel towers was announced.

In 2022, a stabbing spree occurred in front of the resort.

In 2023, a tunnel was drilled to the Wynn for a future station of the Las Vegas Convention Center Loop, an underground car shuttle service.

=== Union history and tip policy ===
A few months after opening, the resort signed an unprecedented 10-year union agreement with the Culinary Workers Union. Previous agreements at other resorts had only gone up to five years. The Wynn contract covered 4,000 workers; the resort's 600 table game dealers were among those not covered.

In August 2006, Wynn Las Vegas announced a tip-sharing policy requiring its dealers to share tips with their managers. Wynn dealers made up to $100,000 per year, making this among the most profitable positions in the gaming industry. The policy was meant to equalize incomes between dealers and supervisors; the latter earned significantly less income, resulting in a shortage of supervisory positions. Dealers said the policy could cost them $20,000 in annual income. In addition to tips, Wynn also gave supervisors a $5,000 raise. The tip-sharing policy was later implemented at Encore Las Vegas as well.

Two Wynn dealers filed a lawsuit against the resort challenging the policy, but were eventually dismissed by a judge. Two other dealers filed complaints with the National Labor Relations Board (NLRB), and also filed lawsuits against Wynn, alleging that he went on a tirade during a meeting with dealers. In 2007, the Nevada Legislature attempted and failed to pass a bill which would have ended the resort's tip-sharing policy. Later that year, dealers voted to unionize through the Transport Workers Union of America (TWU), hoping to put an end to the policy. A couple of dealers were fired allegedly over their pro-union stance.

An agreement on a final union contract was slow-moving. Meanwhile, litigation regarding the tip-sharing policy continued for several years. In 2010, the state labor commissioner ruled it legal. Later that year, dealers voted to approve a 10-year union contract with TWU. Wynn officials were happy with the agreement, which was identical to one previously offered by the resort a year earlier. Tip-sharing continued under the union contract. The labor commissioner's ruling was appealed by the dealers and later overturned by a judge, prompting further litigation. Federal lawsuits were filed by dealers in 2013 and again in 2018, seeking to recoup lost tip wages. A $5.6 million settlement was reached in 2021, benefiting approximately 1,000 current and former dealers. That year, the dealers voted to join the United Autoworkers Gaming Union in a three-year deal. It protected Wynn dealers from the tip-sharing policy, which remained in effect at Encore.

In a separate case, the resort's nightclub employees were also required to share tips with management. The workers, already covered by the Culinary union, filed a class-action lawsuit against the resort in 2010, alleging that the policy was a violation of union contract. The suit was dismissed the following year by a judge, ruling that the issue should instead be handled through arbitration.

=== Expansion proposals ===
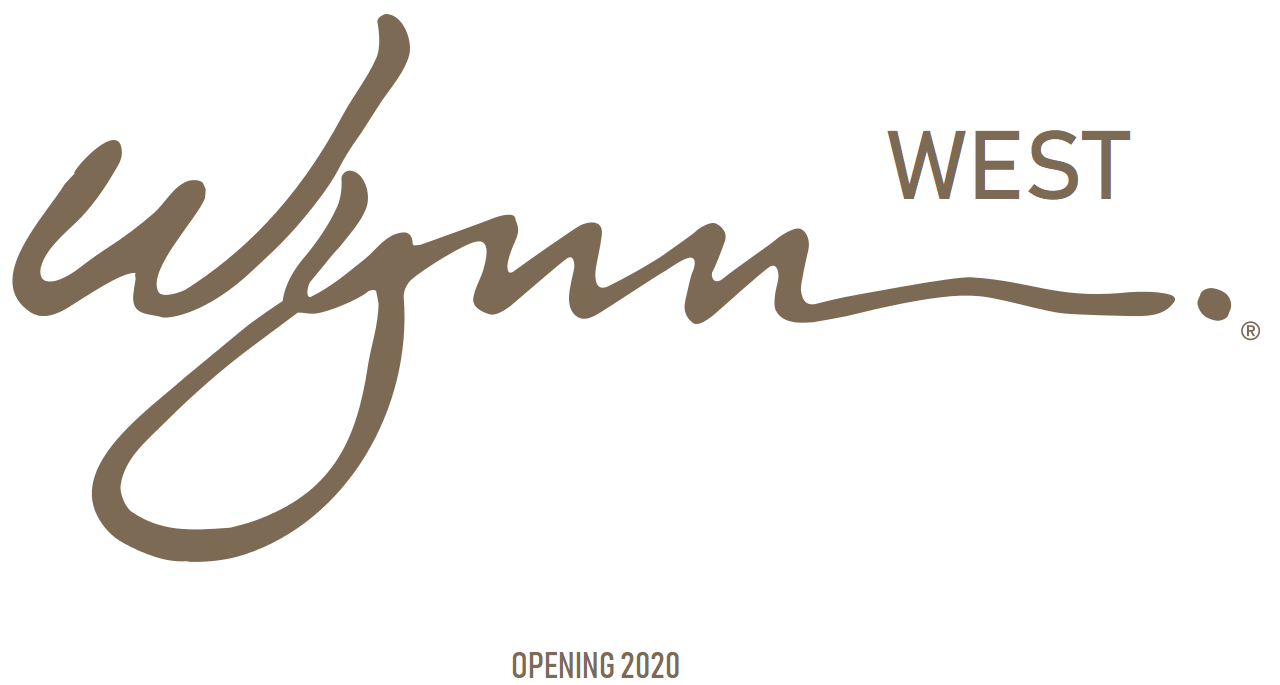
Wynn West logo, advertising a planned 2020 opening

In early 2018, Wynn Resorts bought the 34-acre (14 ha) site where the New Frontier Hotel and Casino stood before its demolition, as well as four adjacent acres, all located across the street from Wynn and Encore. The company planned to build a new casino resort, Wynn West, to complement the existing properties. It would include between 2,000 and 3,000 rooms. However, CEO Steve Wynn resigned from the company shortly after the land purchase, following sexual misconduct allegations against him. Matt Maddox took over as CEO, and plans for Wynn West were shelved.

In 2024, Clark County extended permits for the site, giving Wynn until April 2026 to commence construction on an unnamed resort expansion. The project, to be built on 34.6 acres (14.0 ha), would include a hotel tower with 1,100 rooms, as well as a 28,000 sq ft (2,600 m^{2}) casino and 85,000 sq ft (7,900 m^{2}) of convention space. In the event that Wynn decides not to expand their property or develop the land across the street, Wynn could make up to $1 billion from the sale of that land if they opt to sell.

=== Money-laundering, 2018–2025 ===
In September 2024, the casino agreed to a forfeiture of over $130 million as penalty for "criminal wrongdoing" for allowing an organized network to funnel illicit funds through Wynn Las Vegas during 2018–2024, as part of a Non-Prosecution Agreement with the U.S. Department of Justice (DOJ). State regulators later imposed an additional $5.5 million fine in May 2025, citing persistent non-compliance, despite Wynn's remediation efforts. The penalty is the largest settlement ever paid by a Nevada gaming company to the DOJ.

== Design ==
Unlike most Strip resorts, Wynn Las Vegas does not have a theme. Wynn said: "Our resort will become famous and people will copy us. We're not trying to copy Rome or Italy or New York. It's about the beauty of our desert. It's time for Las Vegas to have its own hotel, its own architecture". He described the design process as "exquisitely uncomfortable" and "the most exciting experience" of his life. According to Wynn Resorts, the "property, rather than a theme, will be the attraction, and, therefore, will have more lasting appeal to customers".

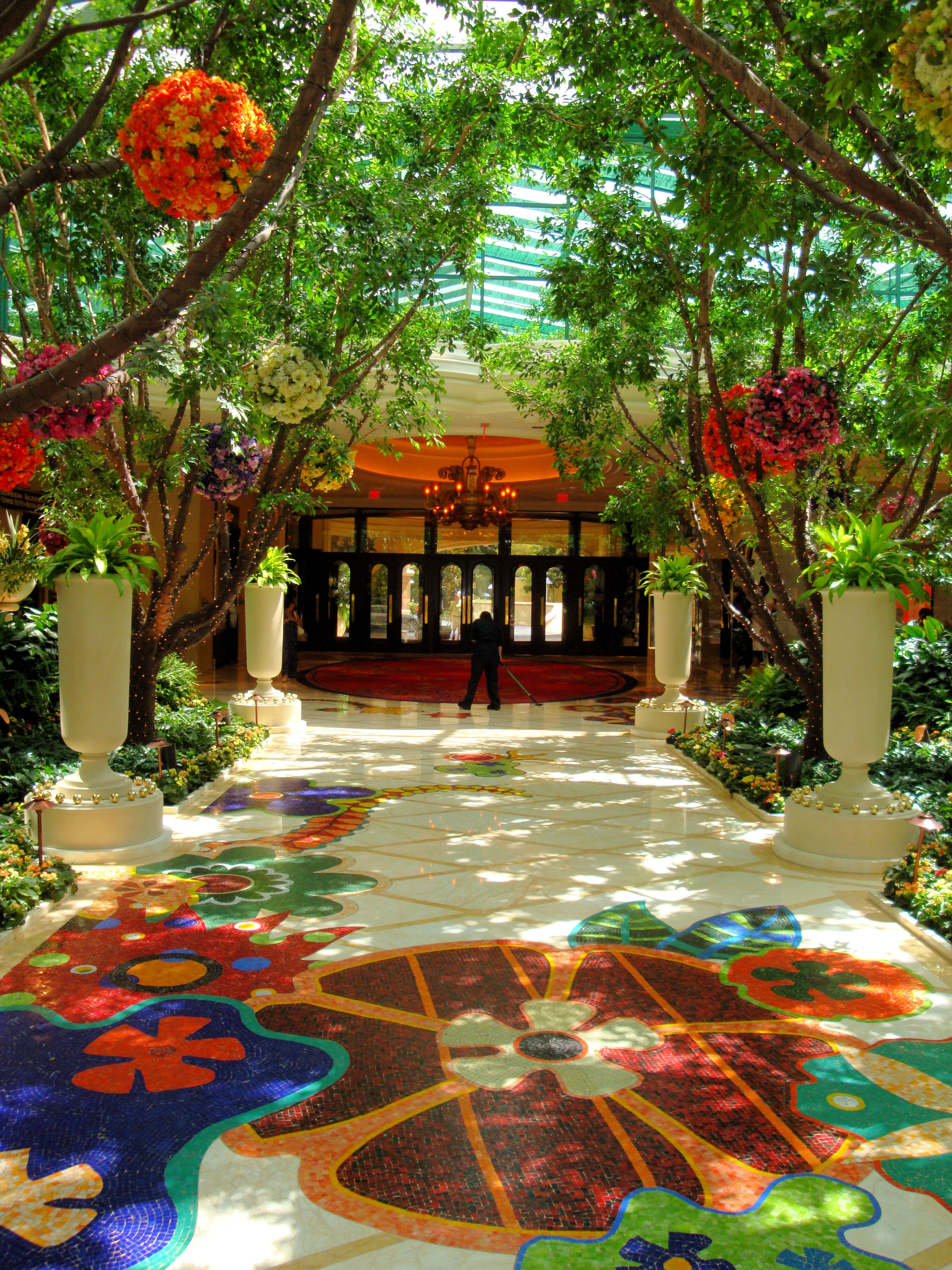
Atrium and indoor garden

Although the resort covers more than 5 million square feet (460,000 m^{2}), Wynn sought to make it feel small and intimate, unlike other resorts. His in-house architectural team was led by DeRuyter Butler. The interior design was largely handled by The Jerde Partnership and Wynn's longtime designer Roger Thomas. In total, more than 130 designers worked on the project, including Jane Radoff, another longtime interior designer for Wynn.

The design team looked to the Bellagio for inspiration, seeking to replicate its success while correcting its mistakes. The design phase lasted two and a half years. Natural light is emphasized throughout the casino and restaurant areas, as well as an indoor garden atrium, similar to the Bellagio's conservatory. The atrium features live trees and plants, as well as flowers that are changed regularly. Red, a lucky color among Asian gamblers, is also used throughout the resort, along with an abundance of flower designs.

The hotel tower has a curved floor plan, and a swooped crown. The tower's exterior consists of bronze reflective glass, and white horizontal stripes every two floors which light up at night. The tower facade was built by Enclos, with consulting from Curtainwall Design & Consulting. Architects had a mixed opinion of Wynn Las Vegas' design. New York architect Ronnette Riley compared the tower to "a big UPS truck" and was critical of its use of reflective glass, which she considered long outdated. Others found the design mature and sophisticated. According to David G. Schwartz, director of the Center for Gaming Research at UNLV, "Wynn invested his very legacy in the new resort, and history will likely vindicate him. Substance over style will be the wave of the future".

Architecture critic Christopher Hawthorne negatively compared Wynn Las Vegas to a "midrise office tower in Houston, circa 1983". Wynn said that critics "missed the point" of the hotel tower's design: "This is a stack of hotel rooms. [...] the reality is that I have to cater to guests. Under that, form follows function". Tom Gorman, also writing for the Los Angeles Times, found the interior of Wynn Las Vegas to be largely derivative of Bellagio, while calling the overall resort "coy" compared to Wynn's previous properties. Fred A. Bernstein of The New York Times called the design of the public spaces "stylistically incoherent (a bit of Italy, a bit of France, more than a bit of Disneyland)", but also found that there "are plenty of nice touches".

== Features ==
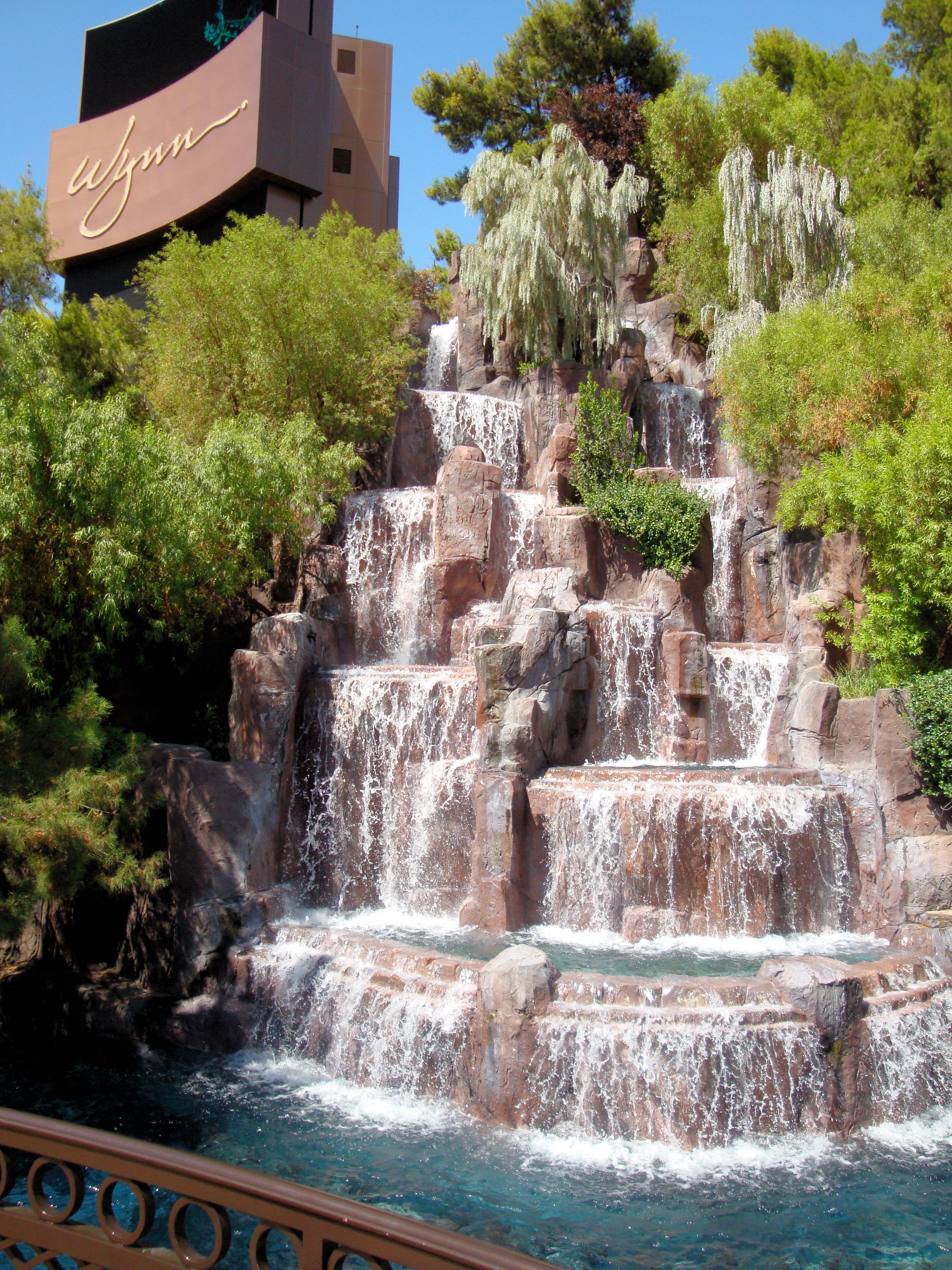
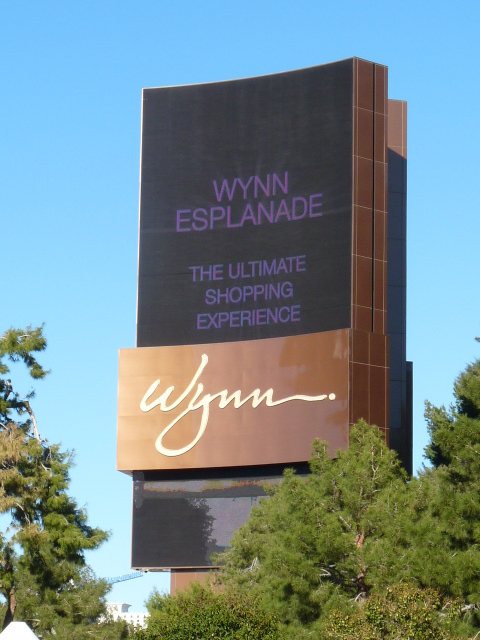
One of the mountain's waterfalls; Wynn's moving sign

The front of Wynn's previous Strip resorts each included free attractions to lure pedestrians inside, such as an artificial volcano at the Mirage, pirate shows at Treasure Island, and the Fountains of Bellagio. In a departure, Wynn Las Vegas obscures its attractions to outside pedestrians by way of an artificial mountain, meant to evoke curiosity and lure people into the resort. It also serves to hide vehicle traffic from guests. The mountain idea was conceived by Steve and Elaine Wynn; the former had previously planned a mountain attraction at the Mirage before scrapping the idea.

The mountain at Wynn Las Vegas was designed by Don Brinkerhoff and designed by his landscape architectural company, Lifescapes International, which worked on Wynn's previous resorts. The mountain rises more than 100 feet (30 m). It is made up of terraced walls, with soil compacted into place. The mountain cost $130 million to build, and includes 1,500 trees, many of them relocated from the former Desert Inn golf course. The mountain also has several waterfalls, some up to 100 feet (30 m) in height. In front of the mountain, and obscured from outside pedestrians, is a 3-acre (1.2 ha) lake overlooked by several restaurants. This area is home to the show Lake of Dreams.

The resort includes a roadside sign along the Strip. It was created by YESCO and measures 135 feet (41 m) in height. It includes an LED screen 100 feet (30 m) high and 50 feet (15 m) wide, with a platform that moves up and down across the screen as an "eraser", presenting new images with each movement.

=== Hotel and casino ===
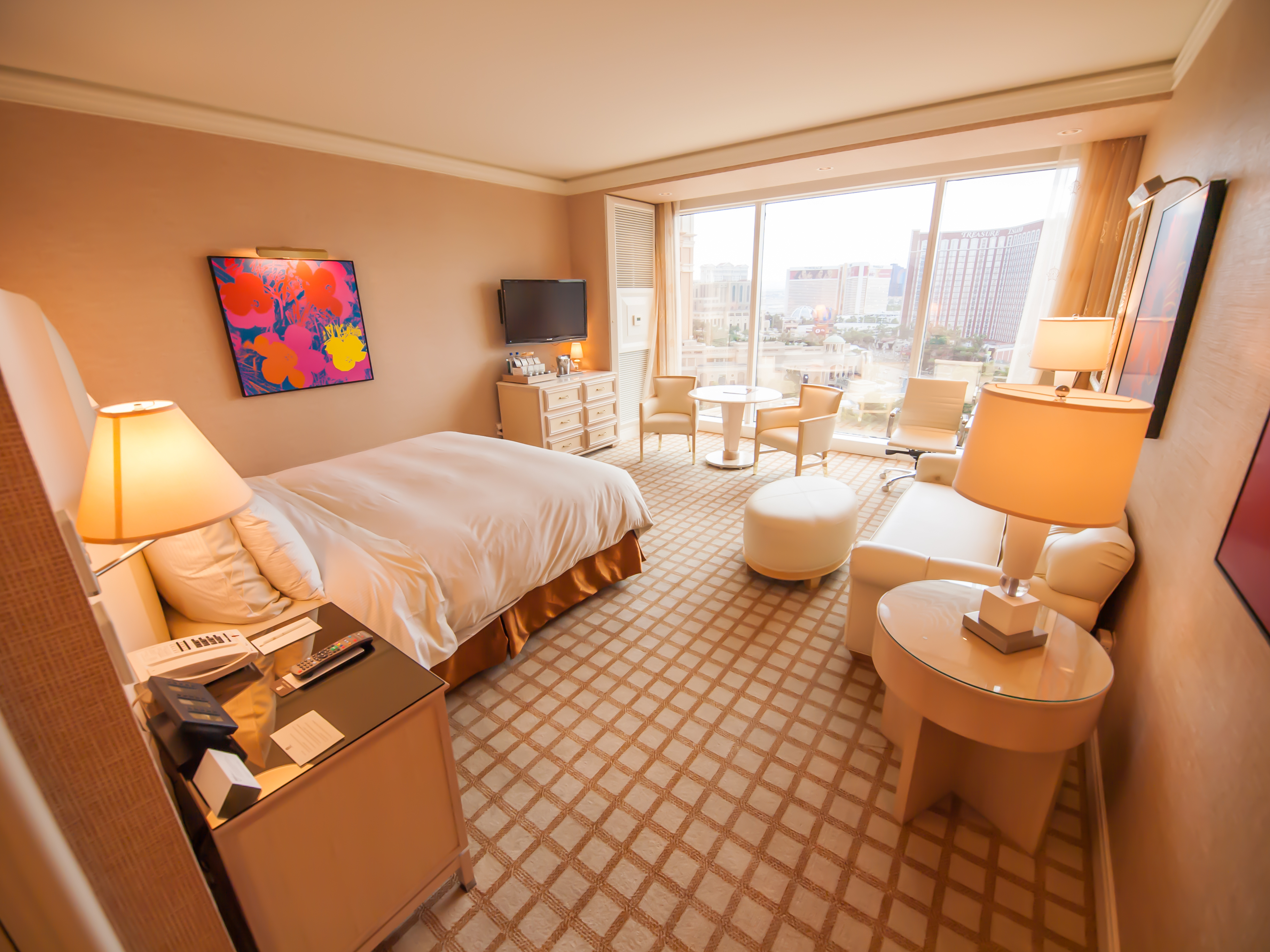
A hotel room at Wynn Las Vegas, 2013

The hotel tower is 45 stories, although its top floor is labeled "60". The tower skips multiple floors, including those containing the number 4, which Chinese gamblers view as unlucky. The tower has a height of 613 feet (187 m). At the time of completion, it was the tallest building in Nevada.

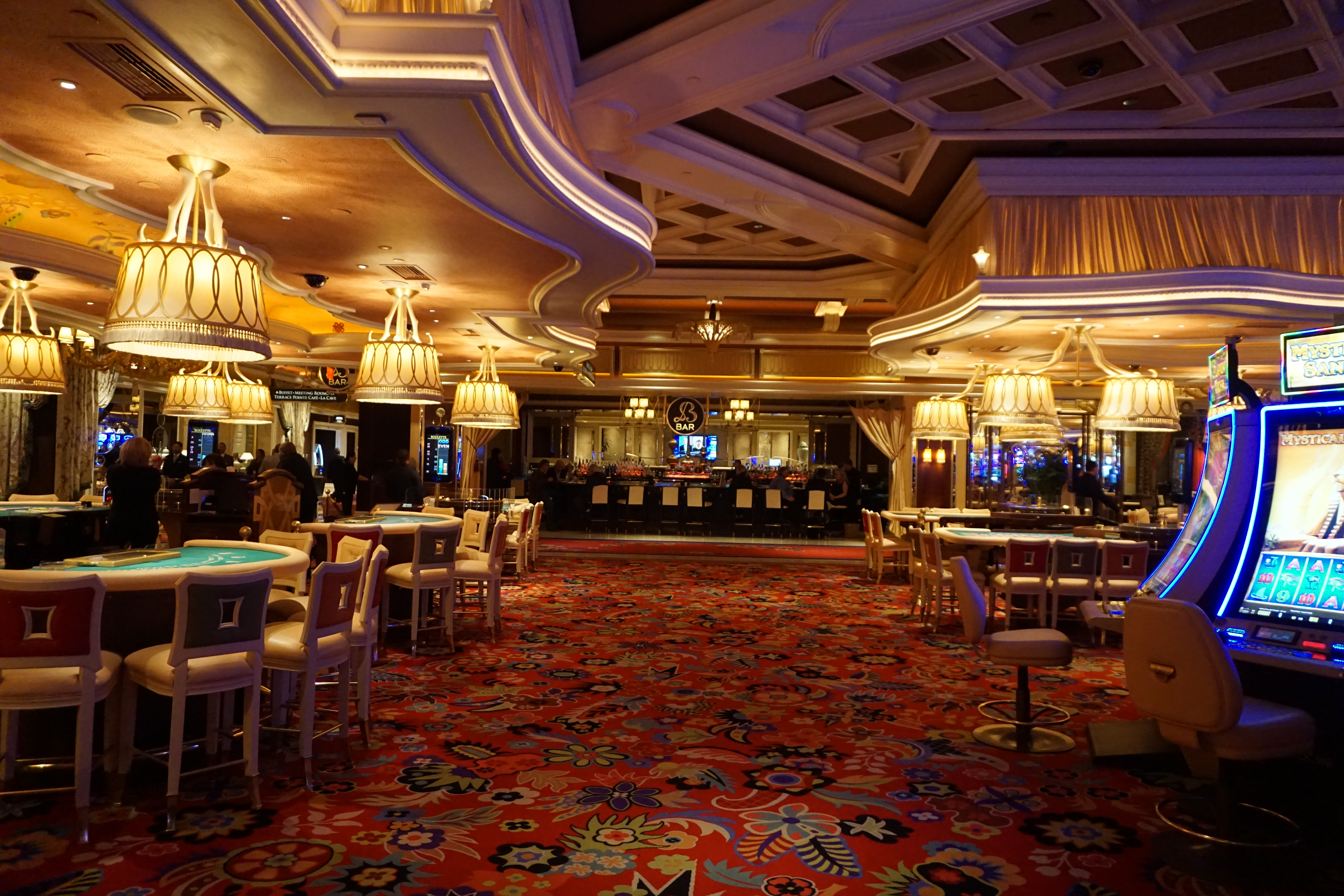
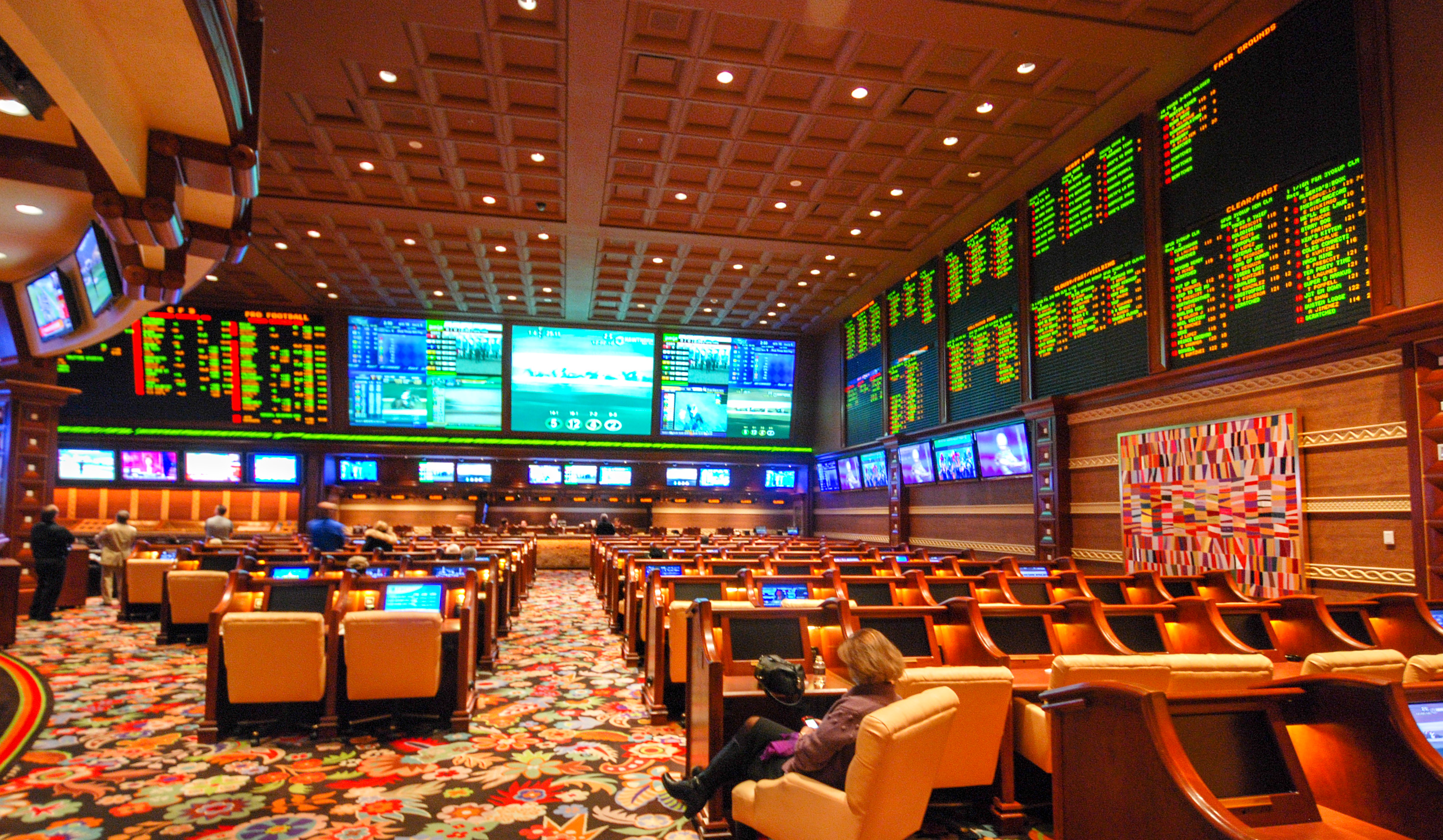
Casino floor and sportsbook

The hotel opened with 2,716 rooms, including 1,800 sq ft (170 m^{2}) suites. The resort includes Tower Suites, a hotel-within-a-hotel. As of 2008, Wynn Las Vegas was the only hotel-casino in the world to have a five-star rating from Mobil Travel Guide, receiving the accolade for its Tower Suites. The property also offered villas on the golf course fairway for its high rollers, a target demographic. As of 2008, the resort had the largest vehicle fleet of Rolls-Royce Phantom limousines in North America. The 10 custom-made vehicles are used for high rollers and celebrity guests. In 2016, the hotel announced that it would place an Amazon Echo in every room, becoming the first resort in the world to do so. The Echo is used to control various aspects of the room, such as temperature and lighting.

The casino measures 111,000 sq ft (10,300 m^{2}). Upon opening, it included 1,962 slot machines and 137 table games. In a break from past casinos, chandeliers were built over each gaming table. In addition, the casino has a poker room, keno lounge, a baccarat salon, and a sports book with a lounge for VIP players. For hotel guests, room keycards doubled as slot cards; Wynn was the first casino to do so. The casino was also among the first in Las Vegas, along with the Hard Rock Hotel to use RFID in its gaming chips to detect counterfeiting. In 2011, the resort became the first in Las Vegas to allow wagers on non-sporting events. The sports book underwent a major renovation in 2017, which included the addition of a video wall measuring 137 feet (42 m) by 11 feet (3.4 m).

The Wynn complex, including Encore, covers 215 acres (87 ha). In total, the complex has 4,748 hotel rooms, and 188,786 sq ft (17,538.8 m^{2}) of gaming space.

The casino features a poker room with 28 tables and runs large seasonal poker tournament series. One such tournament series was the 2023 World Poker Tour Championship which garnered 3,835 players and a $40 million prize pool.

=== Golf course ===
The Desert Inn golf course was retained, receiving a new layout and landscaping to become the Wynn Golf Club. It is the only course on the Strip. The 70-par, 18-hole course measures 6,722 yards, and covers 128 acres (52 ha).

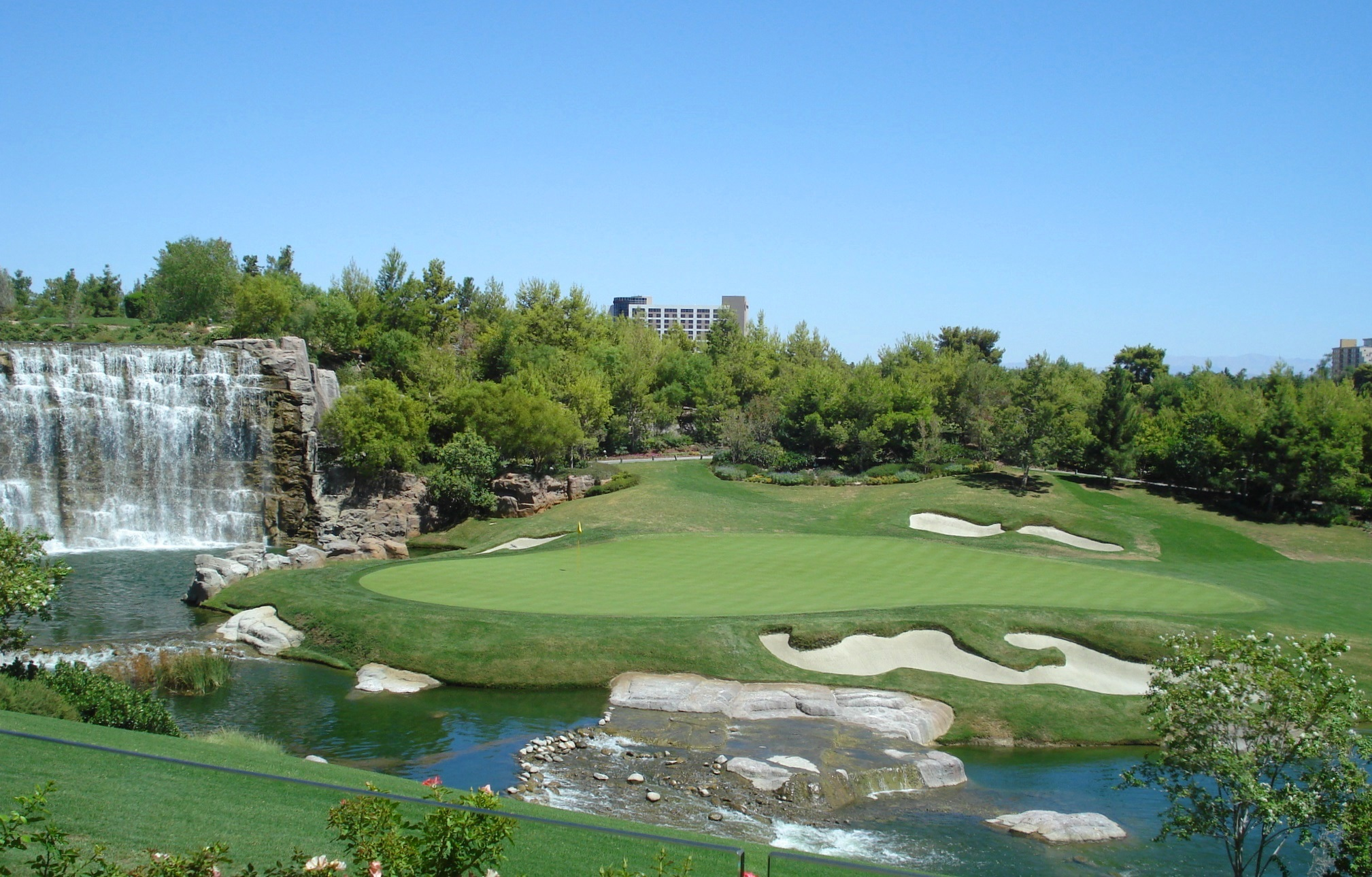
The Wynn golf course in 2008

In 2000, Wynn's company, Valvino Lamore LLC, acquired 41 residential homes at Desert Inn Estates, part of the former resort's country club. The company spent $270 million to buy the golf course and another $50 million for the houses. A dozen remaining homeowners declined to sell and filed suit against Wynn to prevent his redevelopment plans, and he sued them in response. In 2003, Wynn sought to remove state oversight of the property's water by getting a Nevada Assembly bill passed. As owner of the Desert Inn Water Company, Wynn was required to have all his financial plans for the site undergo review by the state's Public Utilities Commission (PUC). He sought to avoid this in the event that he should have to alter his financing plans for the resort. Homeowners objected, believing that Wynn's proposal would give him unreasonable power over their water supply. A modified water bill was signed by Nevada governor Kenny Guinn later that year, eliminating certain financial reporting requirements while allowing the PUC to maintain jurisdiction over the residents. In 2004, Wynn reached an agreement to buy the remaining 10 homes for $23 million.

The Desert Inn course was redesigned by Wynn and Tom Fazio, who both previously worked together on the design for Shadow Creek Golf Course. The Wynn course includes 1,200 trees saved from the former Desert Inn course. The largest trees were left in place; smaller ones were temporarily relocated to a nursery while the course was redesigned. Aside from the trees, a bridge was the only other remnant from the Desert Inn course. New streams and lakes were added to the site, along with elevation changes. The par-70 course measured 7,042 yards.

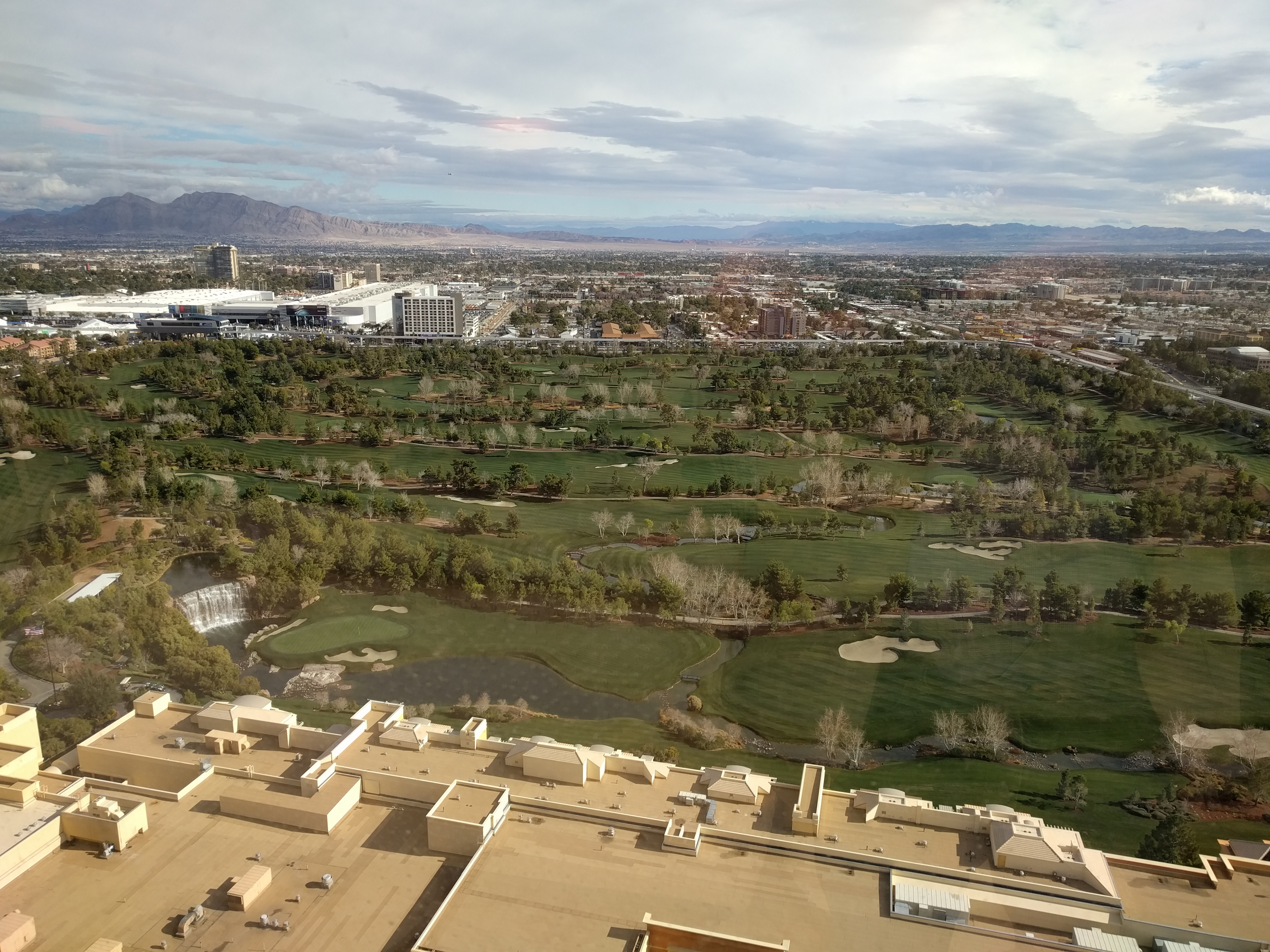
Overlooking the course from the Wynn hotel, 2016

By the end of 2004, Wynn had tentative plans to eventually redevelop the golf course as a mixed-use project revolving around a man-made lake. The project could include hotels, gaming space, and residences, similar to MGM's CityCenter. In 2014, Wynn said he would never redevelop the golf course. He later changed his position and announced new plans for the site in 2016, in the form of Wynn Paradise Park. The project would cost up to $1.6 billion, and would include a hotel and small casino overlooking a lagoon, where guests could take part in various water activities. It would also include a white sand beach and boardwalk. Wynn found the site too valuable to leave undeveloped.

The golf course closed in December 2017, to make way for construction of Paradise Park. Several months later, Matt Maddox took over as CEO of Wynn Resorts, following Steve Wynn's resignation. Commenting on Paradise Park, Maddox said, "We weren't really interested in building a large public swimming pool for the Las Vegas Strip". Plans for the project were scrapped at the end of 2018, after construction costs had risen to $3 billion. A convention facility was the only aspect of the project to proceed, being built on a portion of the golf course. Fazio and his son Logan were hired to revamp the remaining golf course acreage. The redesign included 10 revamped holes and 8 new ones.

The course reopened in October 2019, serving as an additional amenity for the casino's heavily male demographic. The course had lost the Wynn property up to $15 million during its closure. At $550 per round of golf, it was one of the most expensive courses in the U.S. upon its reopening. In 2022, the golf course began hosting the annual Las Vegas Concours d'Elegance automotive event.

The course was also host to the inaugural Netflix Cup, held in conjunction with the 2023 Las Vegas Grand Prix. It has also hosted other events, such as The Match from 2021 to 2023, and the 8AM Invitational in 2024.

=== Restaurants ===
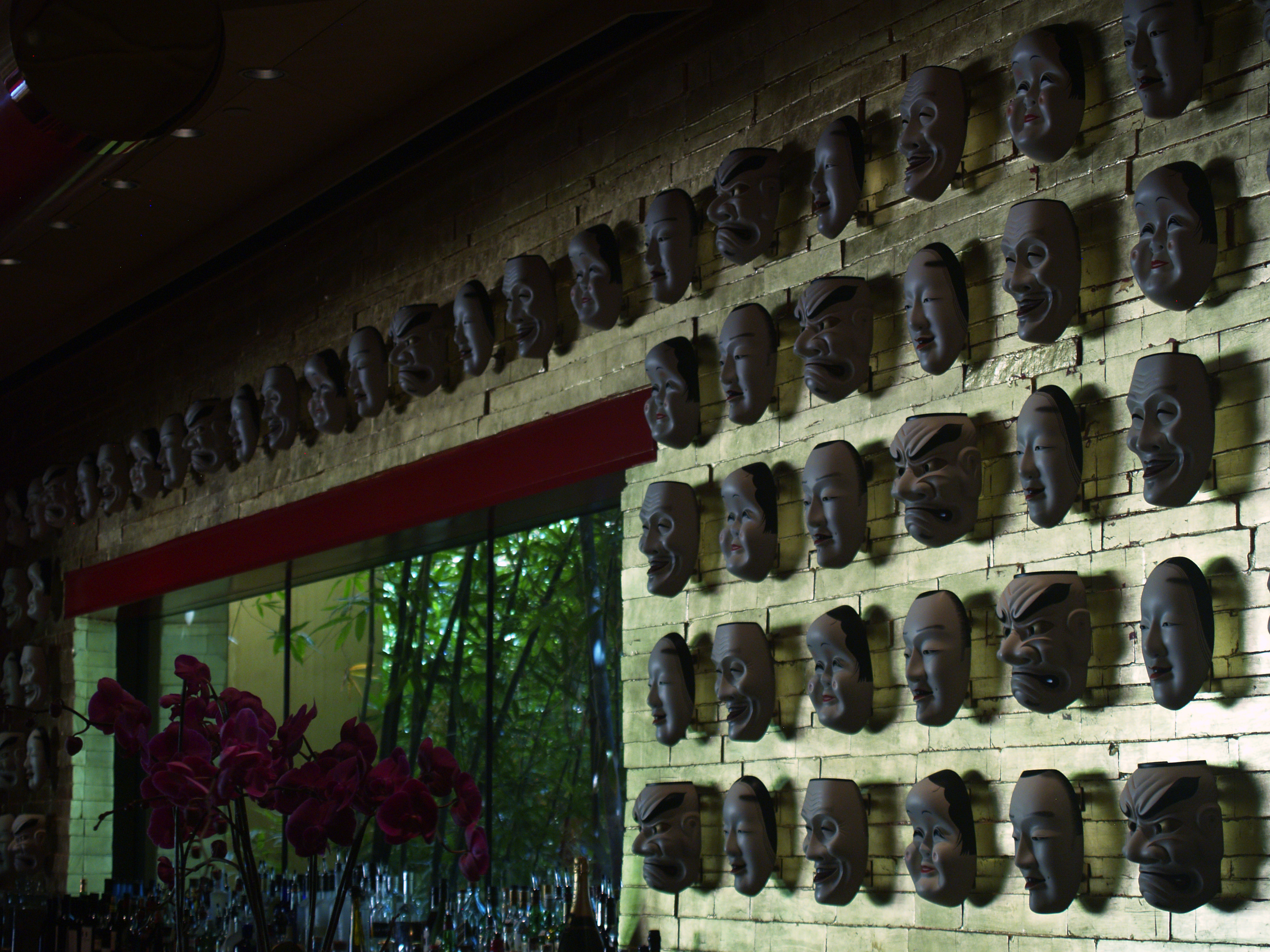
Interior wall at Mizumi, 2012

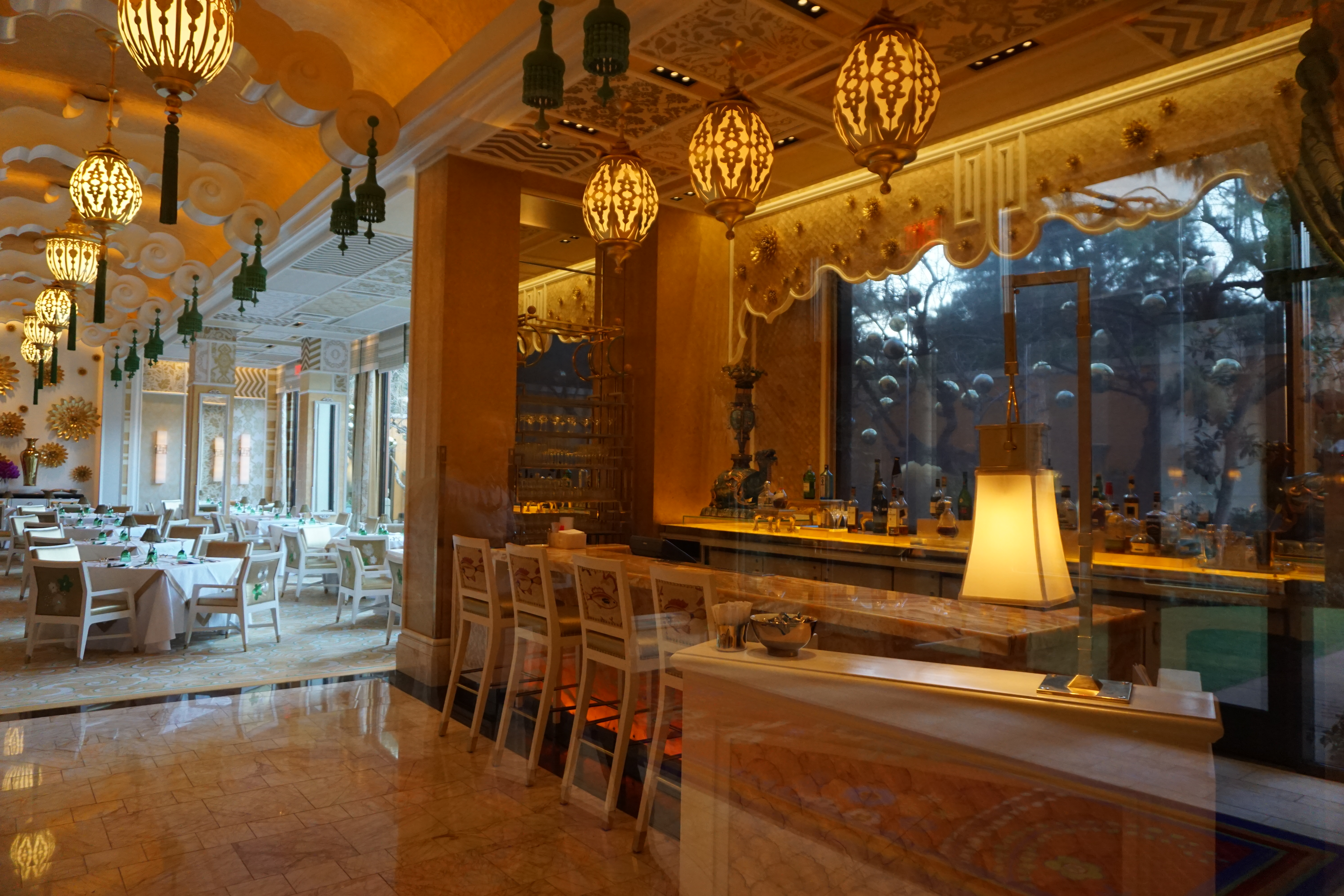
Wing Lei in 2018

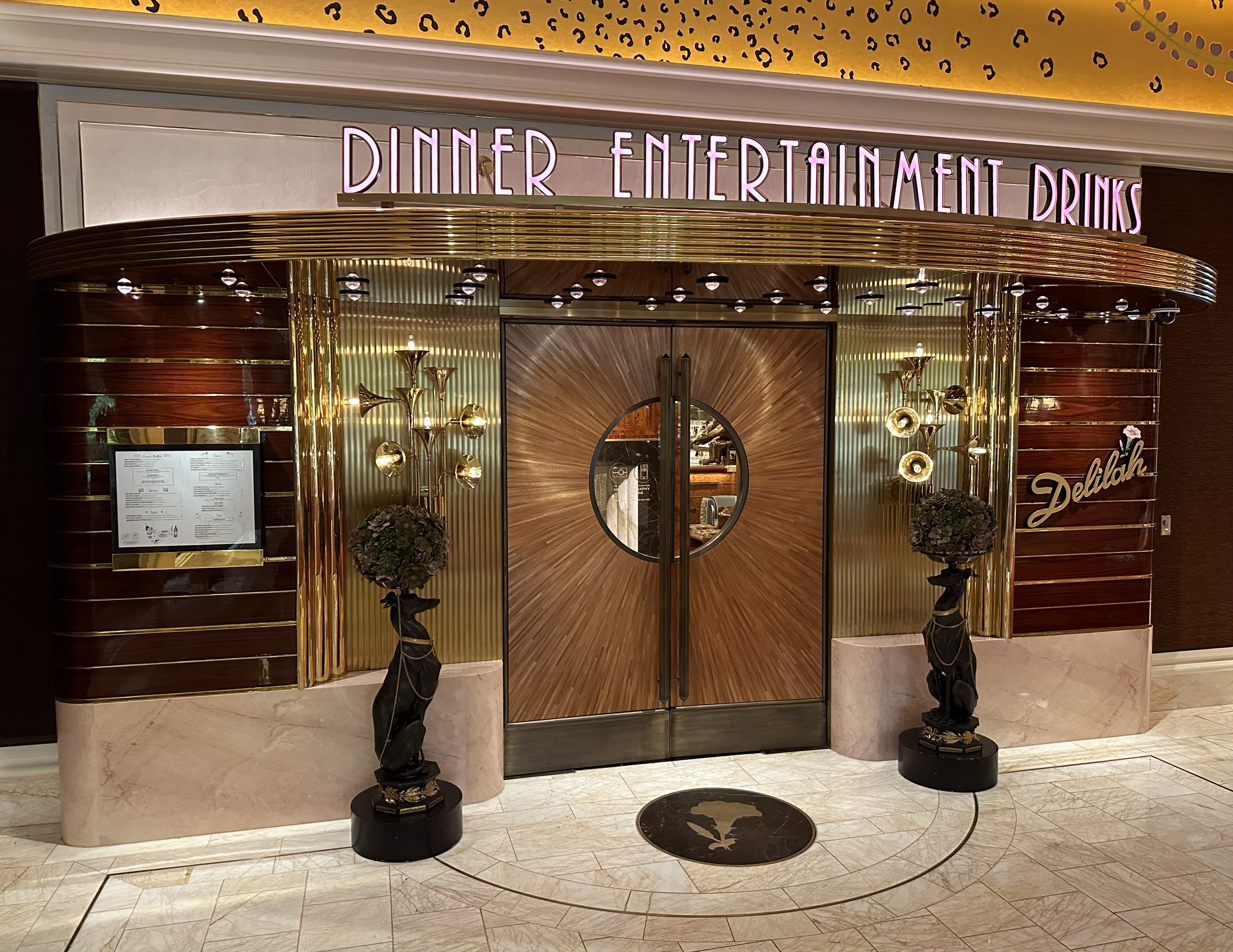
Delilah entrance, 2023

Wynn Las Vegas opened with 18 restaurants, including a buffet and two steakhouses: SW, standing for "Steve Wynn"; and Country Club Grill, overlooking the golf course. The resort's main restaurants were built along the edge of the lake facing the artificial mountain. Unlike other resorts, the restaurants at Wynn Las Vegas are not accessed directly from the casino. According to Wynn: "People know how to find the casino. They don't want to walk out the restaurant door and bump into a slot machine".

Wynn preferred to avoid absentee chefs who oversaw their restaurants from out of town, instead hiring chefs who were willing to move to Las Vegas. Chefs Daniel Boulud and Paul Bartolotta were among those who signed deals with the resort ahead of its opening. Bartolotta Ristorante di Mare imported 1.5 tons of seafood each week, and was among only a few restaurants in the Western Hemisphere to serve langoustine. Bartolotta departed his restaurant in 2015, and it was renamed Costa di Mare later that year. It closed in 2021.

Wynn Las Vegas has had several Asian restaurants, including Okada, a Japanese eatery named after Wynn's business partner Kazuo Okada. It opened along with the resort, and included a sushi bar, a robatayaki grill, and four teppanyaki stations. Takashi Yagihashi served as executive chef. In 2012, Okada was renovated and renamed Mizumi, a common female name in Japan. Mizumi was further renovated in 2024, with Jeff Ramsey named executive chef.

Wing Lei also debuted with Wynn Las Vegas, and would become the first Chinese restaurant in the U.S. to receive a Michelin Star. It was designed by Jacques Garcia, and has views of a garden with 100-year-old pomegranate trees. The restaurant emphasized freshness under chef Richard Chen, featuring five tanks full of fish ready to cook. Aside from Wing Lei, most of the resort's restaurants store their seafood in tanks located in a chilled cooler beneath the casino floor. The cooler houses approximately 3,000 lobsters each month.

Alex, a French restaurant named after chef Alex Stratta, was among the eateries that opened with the resort. It featured a staircase modeled after one featured in the musical Hello, Dolly! Chef Stratta later opened an Italian restaurant, named "Stratta". It replaced Corsa Cucina, an Italian-Mediterranean restaurant which initially featured a grand prix racing theme. Alex closed in 2011; a resort representative said that "high-end French dining is not what people want these days". For five consecutive years leading up to its closure, Alex had won the Forbes Travel Guide Five Star Award and the AAA Five Diamond Award. Stratta's other eponymous restaurant closed in 2012, replaced by a new Italian eatery known as Allegro.

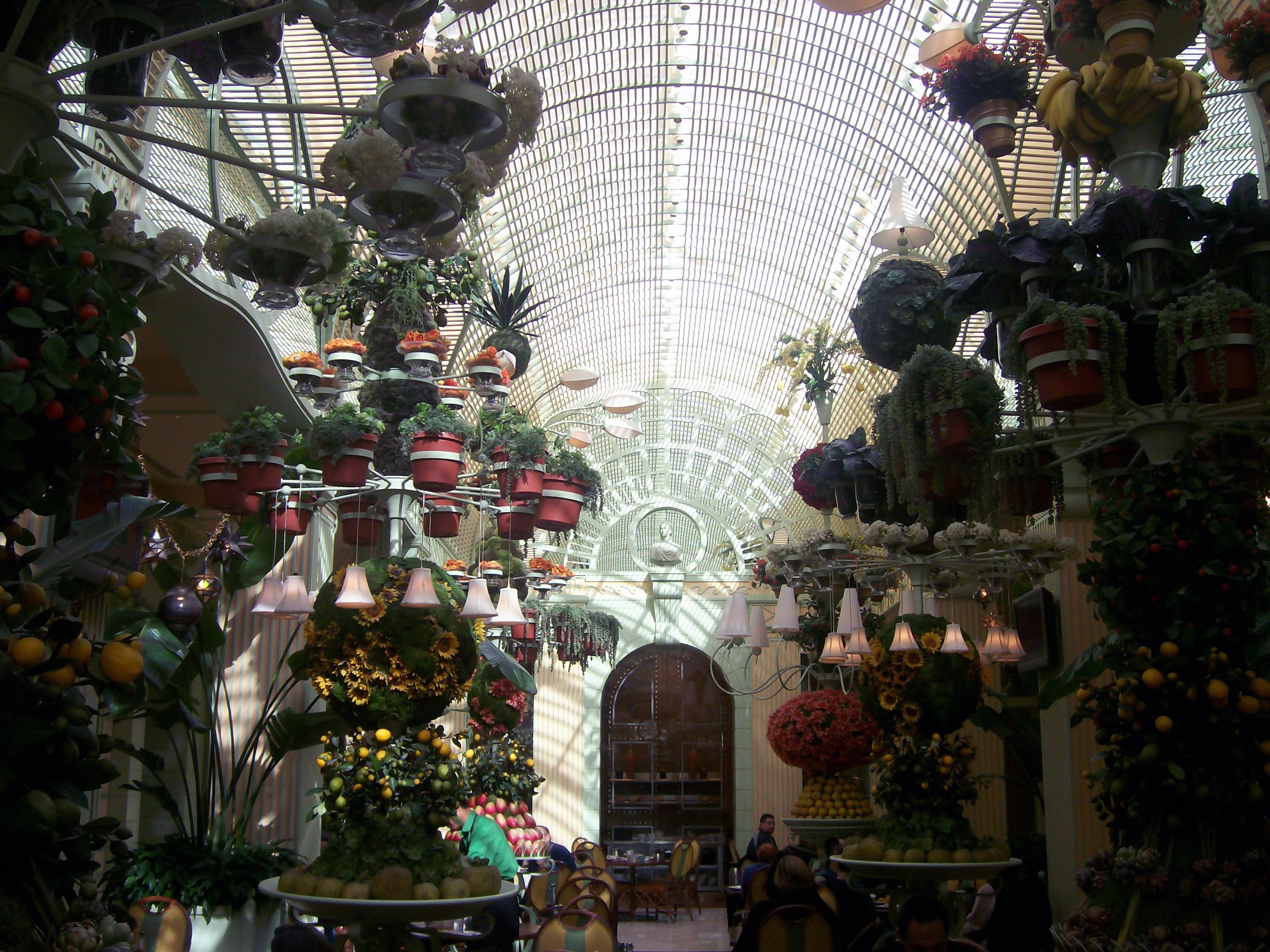
The Buffet at Wynn, 2009

"The Buffet at Wynn" was among the most popular in Las Vegas. Because of health concerns during the early months of the COVID-19 pandemic, the buffet switched to a new format in which servers brought food to the diners. After a few months, Wynn Resorts determined that this concept was unpopular among guests, announcing the buffet's closure later in 2020. The Buffet at Wynn returned in July 2021, with a traditional buffet format.

La Cave Wine & Food Hideaway was opened by Michael Morton in 2010. It underwent a renovation in 2019, adding a garden lounge, and a further renovation in 2024. Cipriani, a chain of Italian restaurants, opened a location at the Wynn in 2018. In 2021, the resort added Delilah, a supper club named after an existing establishment in West Hollywood. Delilah's design is based on Las Vegas supper clubs of the 1950s. Other dining establishments include Tableau, a fine-dining restaurant. In 2024, chef Alon Shaya operated a Mediterranean pop-up restaurant at the resort for nine months. Lakeside, a seafood restaurant overseen by chef David Walzog, closed in 2024. Pisces took its place in mid-2025.

=== Clubs ===
Wynn Las Vegas opened with a water-themed nightclub known as La Bete, French for "The Beast". It served as a restaurant and bar, and would convert to an after-hours club. The club did not meet Wynn's expectations, and the resort's director of nightclub operations departed less than two weeks after the opening. Victor Drai was hired later that year to revamp La Bete. The club closed for a two-month multimillion dollar renovation, reopening as Tryst on New Year's Eve 2005. The new club included more outdoor seating, and was managed by Drai along with brothers Cy and Jesse Waits. Drai departed Wynn Las Vegas in 2010, to pursue other business ventures. Tryst closed in November 2015. It was renovated and reopened in April 2016 as Intrigue, a 14,000 sq ft (1,300 m^{2}) club which would eventually close three years later.

Sean Christie's Las Vegas Nightlife Group operated the Blush nightclub from 2007 to 2011.

Scott Sartiano's Bond Hospitality Group opened a Zero Bond members-only social club on the Wynn property, overlooking the golf course, as well as the adjacent Sartiano's Italian Steakhouse restaurant, in March 2026.

=== Retail ===
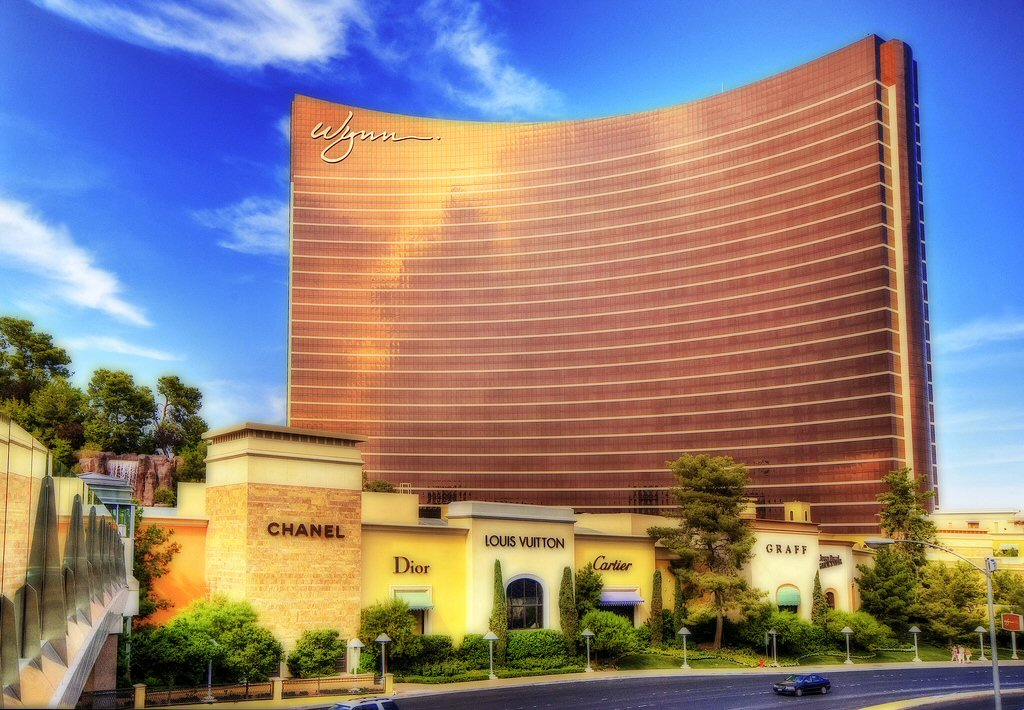
Exterior of Wynn Esplanade, seen along Sands Avenue in 2006

The property opened with an indoor boutique shopping area known as Wynn Esplanade, where the use of skylights is prominent. The retail area measures 76,290 sq ft (7,088 m^{2}). It opened with 32 shops, including several owned and operated by Wynn Resorts. Notable retailers included Cartier, Chanel, Dior, Louis Vuitton, Vertu, and Graff. Fashion designers Jean Paul Gaultier, Manolo Blahnik, and Oscar de la Renta also opened stores at the resort. In addition, Wynn Las Vegas opened with an employees-only convenience store. It is one of five Strip resorts to have such a feature.

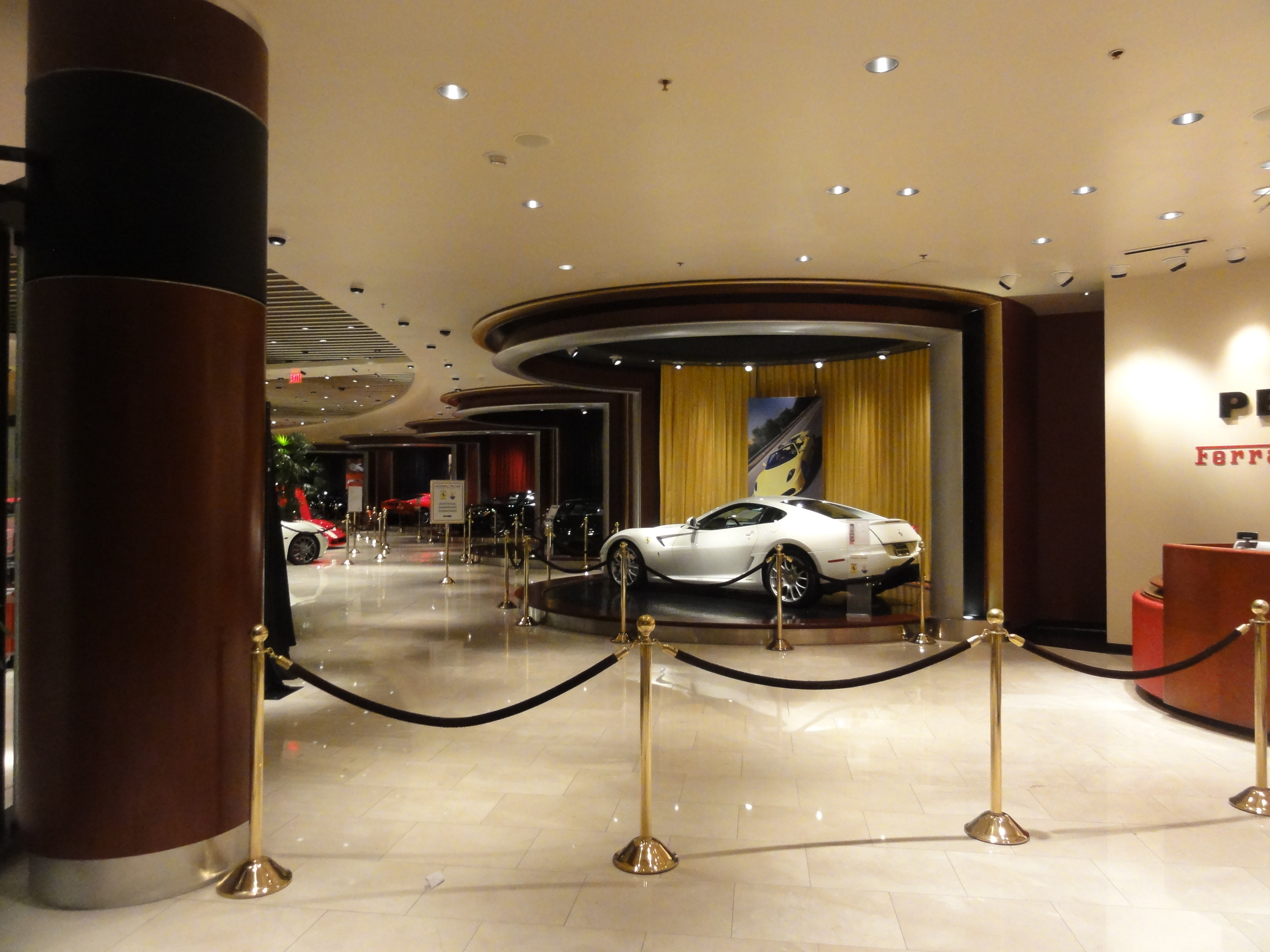
Ferrari and Maserati dealership

The resort also opened with the Penske Wynn Ferrari Maserati dealership, a joint venture between Wynn Resorts and Penske Automotive Group. It was the only Ferrari and Maserati dealership in the state, and included a showroom with new and used vehicles. The dealership proved to be popular among the general public, prompting the resort to start charging a $10 admission fee. In addition to sales, the dealership also leased vehicles out to hotel guests, and included several maintenance bays for owners.

In 2015, Penske and Wynn Resorts chose not to renew the lease on the dealership, which closed at the end of the year. It was replaced by the Wynn Plaza shopping center, which opened in 2018. It measures 70,000 sq ft (6,500 m^{2}), and added 25 upscale retailers, including Breitling SA, Celine, Kiton, Le Labo, Loewe, Omega SA, Stella McCartney, and Rimowa. It is managed by Wynn Resorts and co-owned by Crown Acquisitions.

=== Other features ===
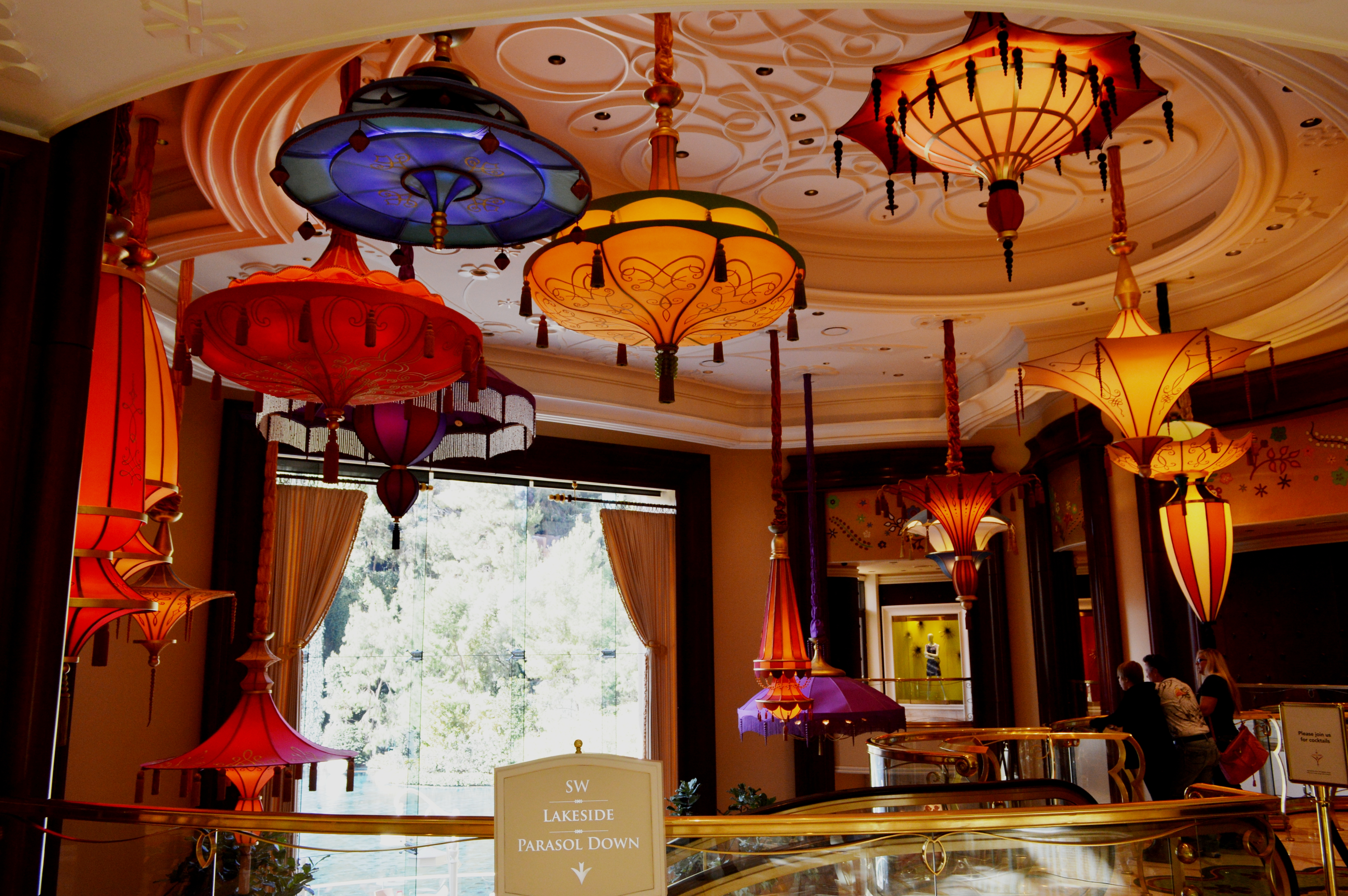
Parasol Up

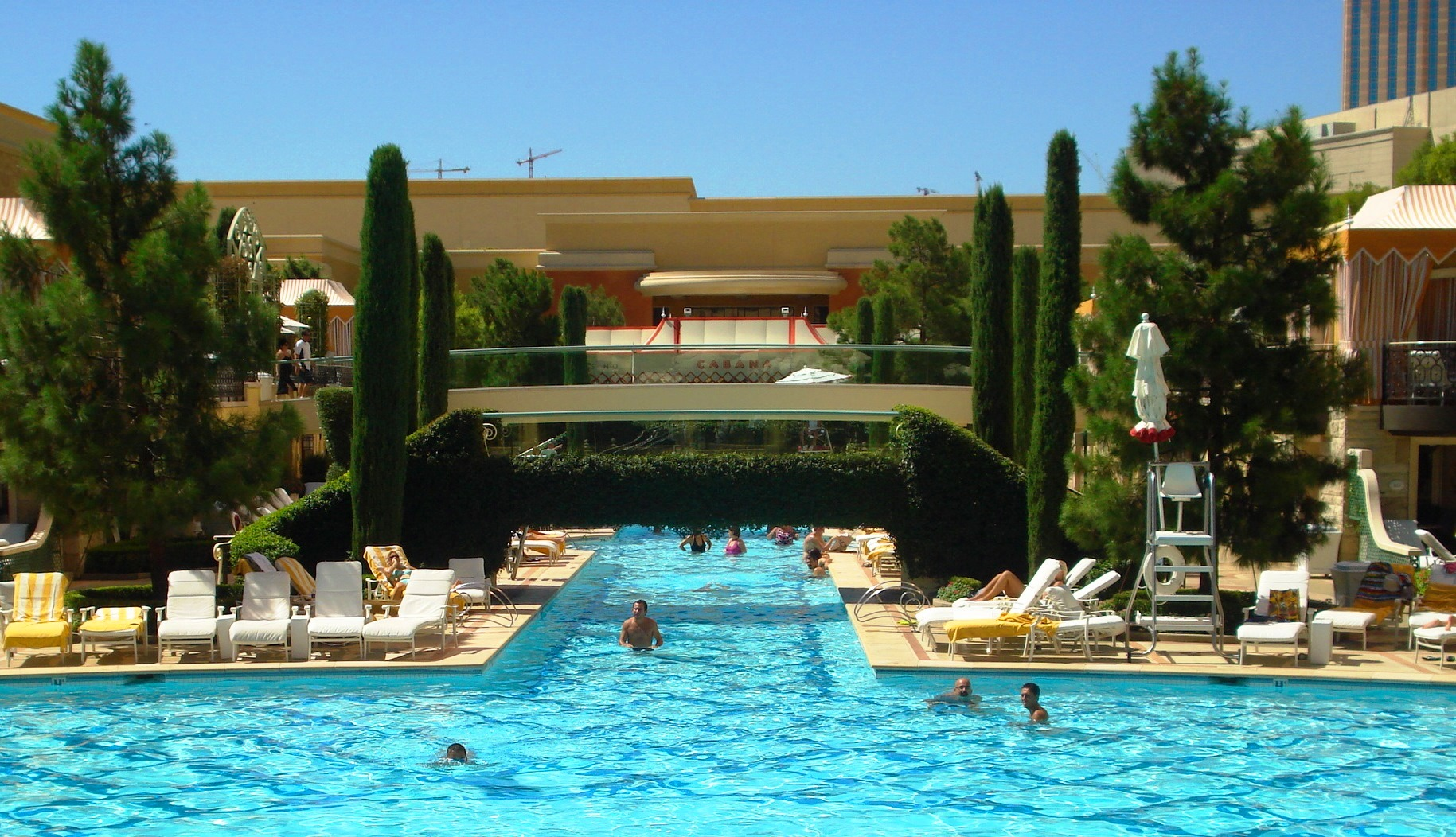
Pool area

Upon opening, the resort had a small art gallery with 15 paintings, including Picasso's Le Rêve and several paintings by Rembrandt and Johannes Vermeer. It closed in 2006 to make way for new retailers, and some of the paintings were then hung around the resort.

Wynn Las Vegas opened with 21 bars. Among them were Parasol Up and Parasol Down, both featuring large parasols that move up and down. The resort also opened with four pools, one of which allowed topless sunbathing.

Convention groups would be a prominent demographic at Wynn Las Vegas, which had 223,000 sq ft (20,700 m^{2}) of space upon opening. Meeting rooms overlooked the golf course. A two-story addition, built for $423 million, was finished in 2020. It brought the resort's total convention space to 560,000 sq ft (52,000 m^{2}).

In 2014, a statue of cartoon character Popeye was put on display in the resort. Wynn paid $28 million for the statue, which is made of stainless-steel and weighs 2,000 pounds. In 2019, the statue was relocated out of state to another resort, Encore Boston Harbor.

Blue Wire, a sports podcast platform, began operating in a $3.5 million studio at the resort in 2021.

== Live entertainment ==
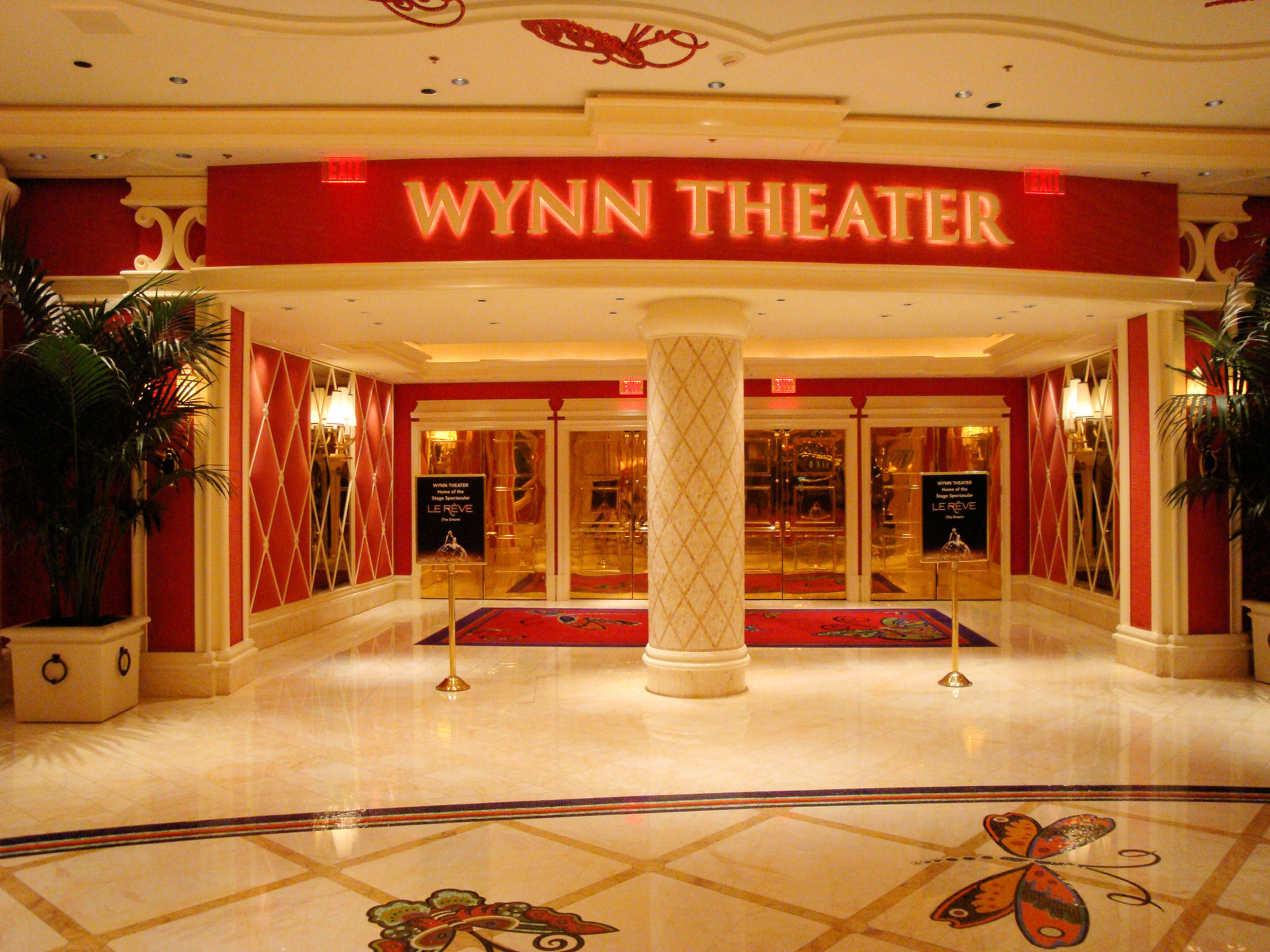
Wynn Theater

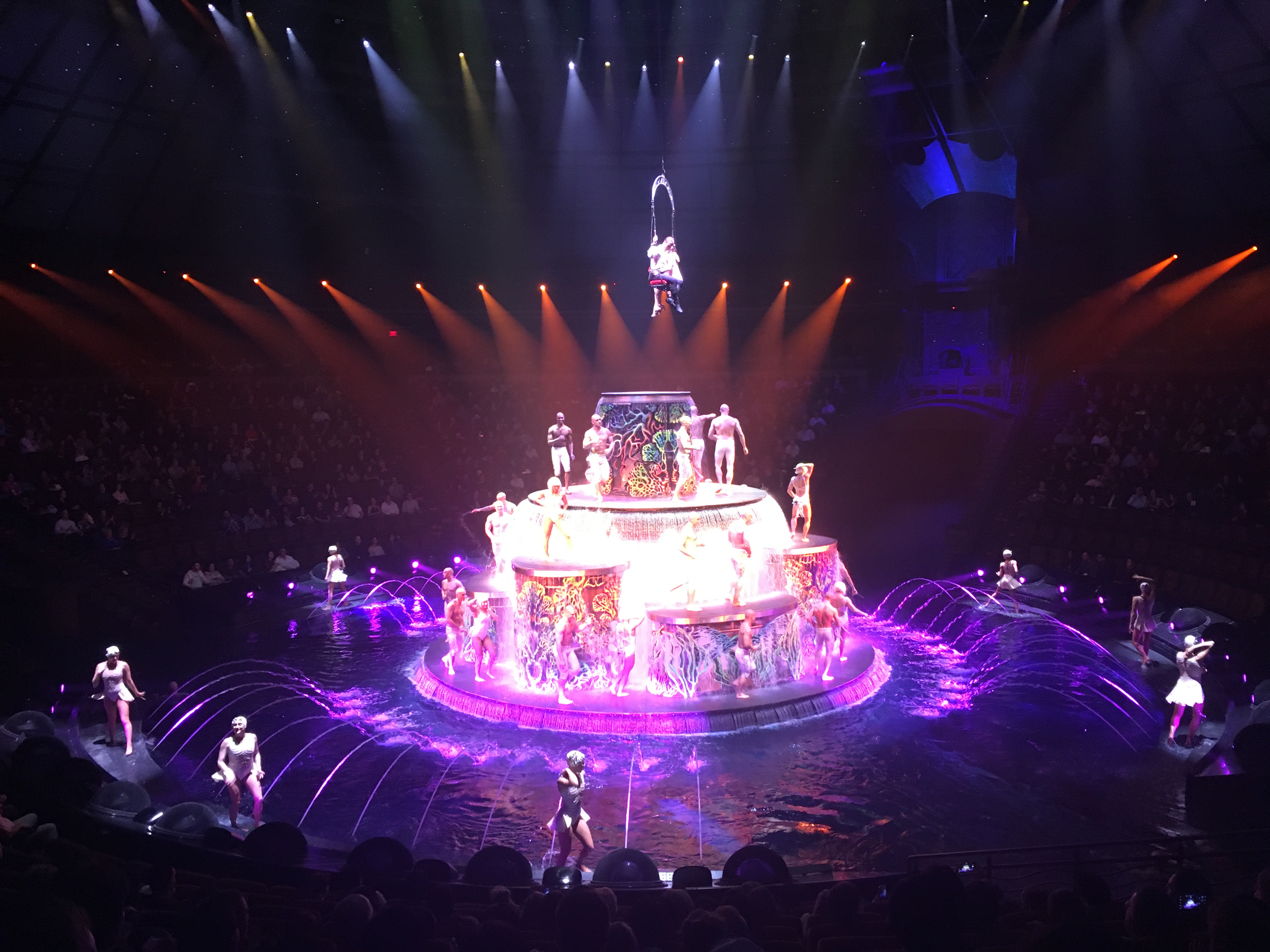
A performance of Le Rêve in 2018

=== Le Rêve and Awakening ===
Wynn Las Vegas' primary production show was Le Rêve, titled after the resort's original name. The aquatic-themed show was directed by Franco Dragone, who previously worked with Wynn to create Mystère (at Treasure Island) and O (at Bellagio). A 10-year deal was signed for the show, with a 5-year renewal option extending it into 2020. Le Rêve featured artistic swimmers, acrobats, aerialists and dancers. It was performed in the Wynn Theater, which had 2,087 seats, with the farthest seat 42 feet (13 m) from the stage. The theater used in the round seating which overlooked a giant central pool used for performances.

Le Rêve cost at least $40 million to create, although initial reception was underwhelming, prompting changes to the show. Wynn bought out Dragone's interest in 2006 and assumed creative control of Le Rêve, making further changes over the years. Le Rêve would go on to become one of the most popular shows in Las Vegas.

The Le Rêve aqua theater was used for film, television and music videos. In 2015, scenes from Paul Blart Mall Cop 2 were filmed in the theater utilitizing the stage. In 2013, Face Off, the reality game show on the syfy channel, filmed their season finale challenge using the theater, as well as performers who underwent make overs that needed to withstand the water and the acrobatic performance. An episode of American Idol was filmed in the theater in 2012. Prior to this in 2010, Brandon Flowers shot his music video "Only the Young" from his first solo album, in the aqua theater featuring the Le Rêve performers.

Le Rêve closed in 2020, due to uncertainty brought on by the COVID-19 pandemic.

Awakening opened in November 2022, and includes music and choreography, as well as large-scale puppetry from puppet designer Michael Curry. The former Le Rêve theater was extensively renovated for Awakening, which incorporates a new stage made of dichroic glass and LED screens. The stage is divided into sections which can be raised and rotated. The redesigned theater includes 1,600 seats. Awakening closed for a two-week period in February 2023, allowing rehearsals for a slightly revamped version of the show. The changes included new music and clarity in the storyline, which had been a source of criticism. Two months later, the show closed for further changes, reopening in June 2023. The revamped show features updated choreography from dancer Mandy Moore, as well as new costumes.

=== Lake of Dreams ===
Lake of Dreams takes place at the resort's 3-acre (1.2 ha) lake. Several restaurants and lounges overlook the show, which includes a giant head made of steel and fiberglass that rises from the lake to sing. Music is emitted from 100 speakers, and footage is also projected onto a waterfall. In addition, the show features a 30-foot (9.1 m) tall frog who sings and dances. The show was designed by Kenny Ortega and Michael Curry Design. As of 2012, the show had put on 30,000 performances.

A $14 million technological upgrade was completed in 2020, after two years in the works. Ortega and the original creative team returned for the revamp project, which included three new animatronics, measuring 28 feet (8.5 m) in height. The animatronics depict female bird characters who sing a variety of songs by female artists. The frog animatronic, which remains in the show, had only covered songs by male singers.

=== Other shows and entertainers ===
In addition to the Wynn Theater, the resort also opened with a second venue, known then as the Broadway Theater, and since renamed the Encore Theater. It originally featured 1,200 seats and was built to host Avenue Q, an adult puppet show which opened at the resort in 2005. Wynn had seen the show in New York and was enthusiastic about it, believing that it could have a 10-year run at his resort. However, it failed to meet his expectations and was closed in May 2006.

Aside from Avenue Q, Wynn had also signed the musical comedy Spamalot to perform at the resort. Wynn Las Vegas initially planned to build a third theater, on part of the resort's golf course, to host the show. This was scrapped in order to preserve the golf course view for guests. After Avenue Q was canceled, Spamalot instead took the over the Broadway Theater, which was renamed the Grail Theater. The show ran from March 2007 to July 2008.

By February 2009, the second venue was renamed the Encore Theater, after Wynn's new sister property. The theater is located between the two resorts, and has 1,480 seats. Singer, comedian and impressionist Danny Gans began performing in the theater that month as headline entertainer, until his death in May 2009.

Beyoncé held her I Am... Yours concert residency at the Encore Theater during mid-2009, and country singer Garth Brooks periodically performed in the theater from 2009 to 2014, with a residency known as Garth at Wynn. Other notable performers in the Encore Theater have included Whoopi Goldberg, Harry Connick Jr., Robbie Williams, Jo Koy, Sarah McLachlan, Sebastian Maniscalco, and Nate Bargatze.

Steve Wynn's Showstoppers opened in the Encore Theater in late 2014. The production musical featured 30 singers and dancers. It was directed by Philip McKinley and choreographed by Marguerite Derricks. The show ended in 2016.

== Accolades ==
Since its opening, Wynn Las Vegas has been a repeat winner of the AAA Five Diamond Award and the Five Star award from Forbes Travel Guide. Wynn Las Vegas and Encore, along with Wynn Palace in Macau, are the three largest Forbes Five-Star resorts in the world. As of 2009, the two spas at the Wynn complex were also the only ones in the state to have five-star ratings. In 2017, readers of Condé Nast Traveler also named the two Wynn resorts as the best hotel property in Las Vegas, noting the high level of luxury. It has since been a repeat winner as named by readers.

== See also ==
- List of casinos in Nevada
- List of tallest buildings in Las Vegas
- List of largest hotels
- List of integrated resorts
