= Alex (restaurant) =

Coordinates: 36°07′46″N 115°09′58″W

- Interactive map of Alex

Restaurant information
- Closed: January 15, 2011
- Food type: French
- Location: Las Vegas Valley, Nevada, U.S.

Alex was a French restaurant located in Las Vegas, Nevada, United States, that held two Michelin stars. It is the namesake restaurant of celebrity chef Alessandro Stratta, Iron Chef USA, and winner of the James Beard Foundation Award for "Best Chef Southwest" in 1998. The restaurant was well known for Stratta's unique approach and attention to molecular gastronomy. The restaurant was considered one of the finest in the United States. It closed indefinitely on January 15, 2011. The food was French with an Italian influence and was offered via a prix fixe menu only.

== Awards and honors ==
- 5 stars, 2006-2010 Mobil Travel Guide
- 5 diamonds, 2006-2010 AAA Restaurant Ratings
- 2 stars, 2008 and 2009 Michelin Guide

== See also ==
- Alessandro Stratta
- List of Michelin-starred restaurants in Las Vegas
- List of restaurants in the Las Vegas Valley
- Wynn Las Vegas
