= Pisces (restaurant) =

Coordinates: 36.1265°N 115.1675°W

PISCES
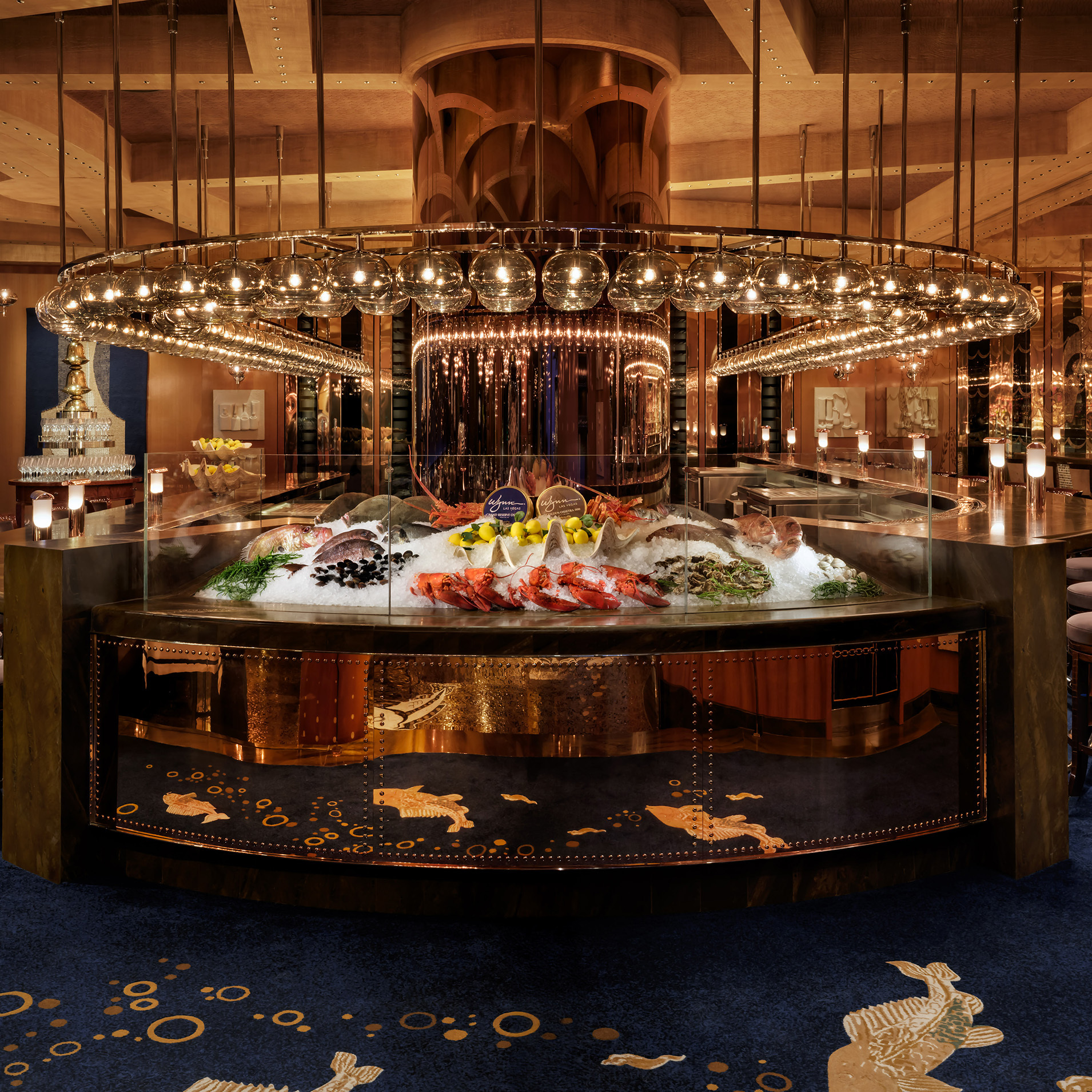
- Seafood bar at PISCES
- Interactive map of PISCES

Restaurant information
- Established: 2025
- Location: 3131 Las Vegas Blvd S, Las Vegas, Clark County, Nevada, Nevada, 89109, United States
- Website: www.wynnlasvegas.com/dining/fine-dining/pisces

PISCES is a Mediterranean restaurant located at Wynn Las Vegas on the Las Vegas Strip. It opened in 2025. Chef Martin Heierling leads the restaurant.

== History ==
Pisces occupies the former location of Lakeside, which closed in 2024. It opened May 10, 2025, following renovation. Pisces has a waterfront view overlooking the Lake of Dreams.

The concept for Pisces was created in-house at Wynn. An extensive renovation overseen by Todd-Avery Lenahan brought 400 murano glass orbs, a mosaic floor of copper-infused glass and numerous other luxury touches to the space to create an "immersive" interior.

Chef Heierling is a 30-year veteran executive chef. Prior to Pisces, Chef Heierling created Sensi at the Bellagio and Silk Road at Vdara.

== Cuisine ==
Pisces "draws inspiration from coastal traditions of the Mediterranean." According to Eater, the menu features "specialty oils from Greece, pasta from Tuscany, refined Mediterranean seafood like grilled dry-aged branzino and rare blue lobsters, and whimsical dessert shaped like fish." A unique dish is the blue lobster, available in two different preparations.

Fish are sourced from the Mediterranean, including Morocco, Spain, Italy, and Greece.

Lobster pasta is considered a specialty of the restaurant, based on a heavily reduced white stock. Forbes highlighted the Kaluga caviar bumps on crisp airbread as a specialty item.

== Reception ==
Eater called the setting “one of the most stunning restaurant spaces on the Las Vegas Strip.” Observer called it “a seafood wonderland with luxury to spare.” It was also called one of the best restaurants with a waterfront view in Las Vegas.

Pisces was named one of the top 100 restaurants in Las Vegas in 2025 as well as “best new mediterranean restaurant” in Las Vegas in 2025, a best new restaurant, and a best seafood restaurant in Las Vegas. GoVisit called it a “gem” that blends a “sophisticated bar atmosphere with an exquisite seafood restaurant.

== See also ==
- List of restaurants in the Las Vegas Valley
