= Wing Lei =

Restaurant in Las Vegas, Nevada, U.S.

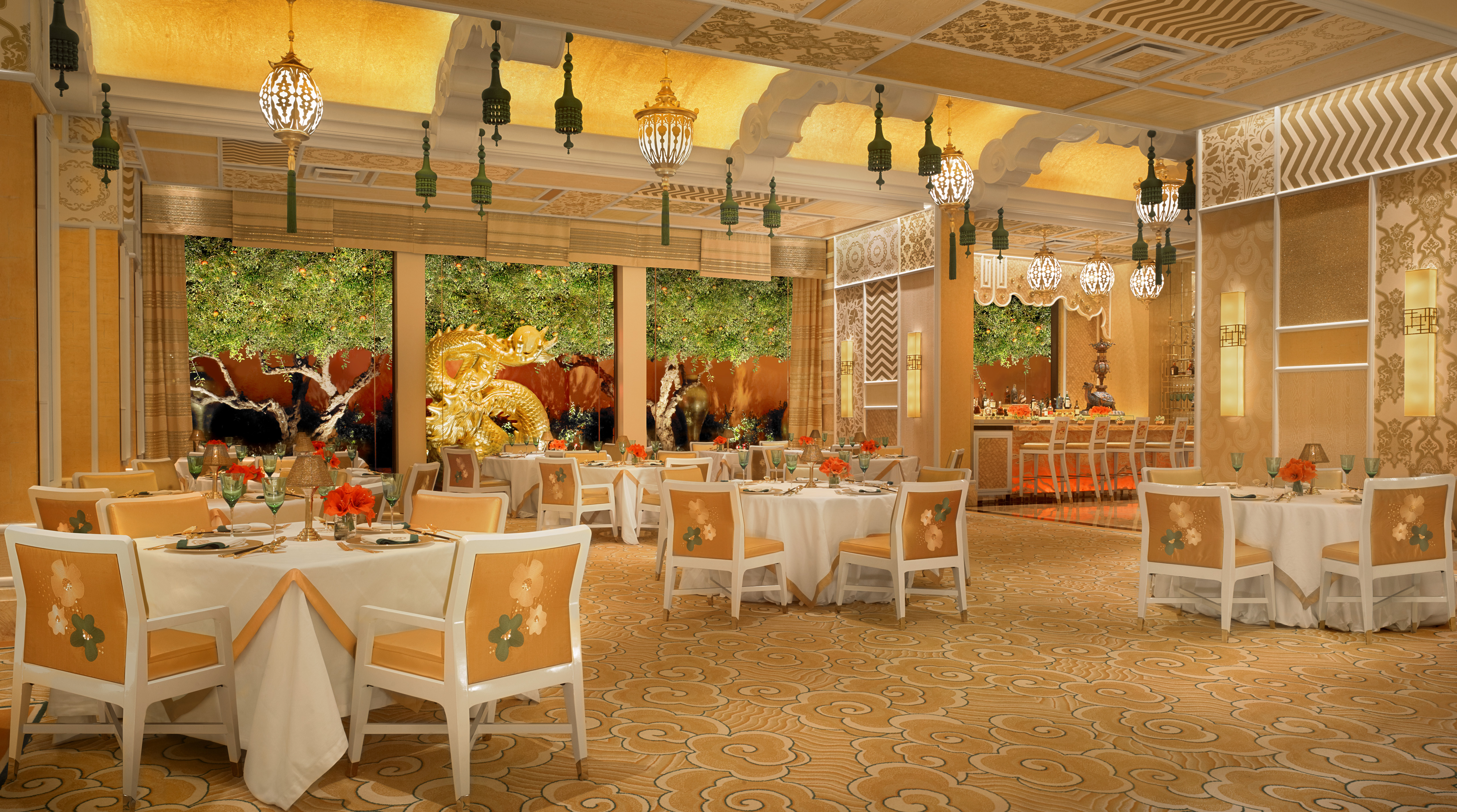
- Wing Lei as seen in 2026
- Interactive map of Wing Lei

Restaurant information
- Established: 2005
- Rating: Macau (Michelin Guide)
- Location: 3131 Las Vegas Blvd S, Las Vegas, Nevada, 89109, U.S.
- Coordinates: 36.1253604°N 115.1658063°W
- Website: www.wynnlasvegas.com/dining/fine-dining/wing-lei

Wing Lei is a Chinese fine-dining restaurant within Wynn Las Vegas on the Las Vegas Strip. Opened in 2005 it is the first Chinese restaurant in the United States to be awarded a Michelin star. It remains the only Forbes Travel Guide five-star Chinese restaurant in North America.

It has a sister restaurant of the same name at Wynn Macau, which carries two Michelin stars.

== History ==
=== Wynn Las Vegas ===
Wing Lei opened with Wynn Las Vegas in 2005 and has remained as one of the founding restaurants still in operation. It is led by Chef Ming Yu.

The restaurant was remodeled in 2013. It currently features private dining rooms for groups, as well as tables that look out over a private garden with 100-year-old pomegranate trees.

The restaurant was first awarded a Michelin star in 2008 and again in 2009. The Las Vegas edition of the Michelin Guide was discontinued in 2010. In 2026, Las Vegas was included in the American Southwest edition of the Michelin Guide, but Wing Lei was not honored with a star.

Wing Lei is also the recipient of the Forbes Travel Guide five-star award each year from 2017 through 2026 and remains the only Chinese restaurant in the United States to win that honor.

=== Wynn Macau ===
Wing Lei inside Wynn Macau, which opened in 2006, is led by executive chef Chan Tak-kwong. The restaurant overlooks Nam Van Lake. The interior colors were inspired by Van Gogh’s Sunflowers; the other most prominent part of the decor is a crystal dragon made of 90,000 individual hand-blown Swarovski crystals that are illuminated by tiny lights. Wing Lei in Macau has been the recipient of one or two Michelin stars every year since 2010.

=== Wynn Palace ===
Wynn Palace, also in Macau, includes the Wing Lei Bar, which was overhauled in 2025. It hosts only 22 guests at a time, with a menu of 12 cocktails.

== Cuisine ==
Wing Lei at Wynn Las Vegas is known for "upscale interpretations of Chinese classics". The most well-known dining experience is the Imperial Peking Duck, served with Mandarin crepes or steam buns. Also commonly discussed are the "three cups sea bass", and a king crab salad with mango and avocado. It is also known for its selection of Chinese teas.

In Macao, Wing Lei inside Wynn Macao has had recommend the cha siu bao (baked barbecue pork buns with sweetened crust) and har gao (steamed shrimp dumplings).

== Reception ==
As the first Chinese restaurant in North America to receive a Michelin star, Wing Lei is called one of the "toughest reservations to get" in Las Vegas and the "most highly acclaimed" dining on the Strip. The Las Vegas Weekly called it a "singular dining destination" among Strip and off-Strip properties. It is known for its service quality and teamwork among service staff. The Washington Post called the cuisine "sumptuous", but noted that the price of the meal meets the quality. Marie Claire UK called it a "must-visit".

The Michelin Guide calls Wing Lei at Wynn Macau "one of the best Cantonese restaurants in Macau" and describes the interior as "strikingly lavish".

== See also ==
- List of Michelin-starred restaurants in the American Southwest
- List of Michelin-starred restaurants in Hong Kong and Macau
