= List of Michelin-starred restaurants in Turkey =

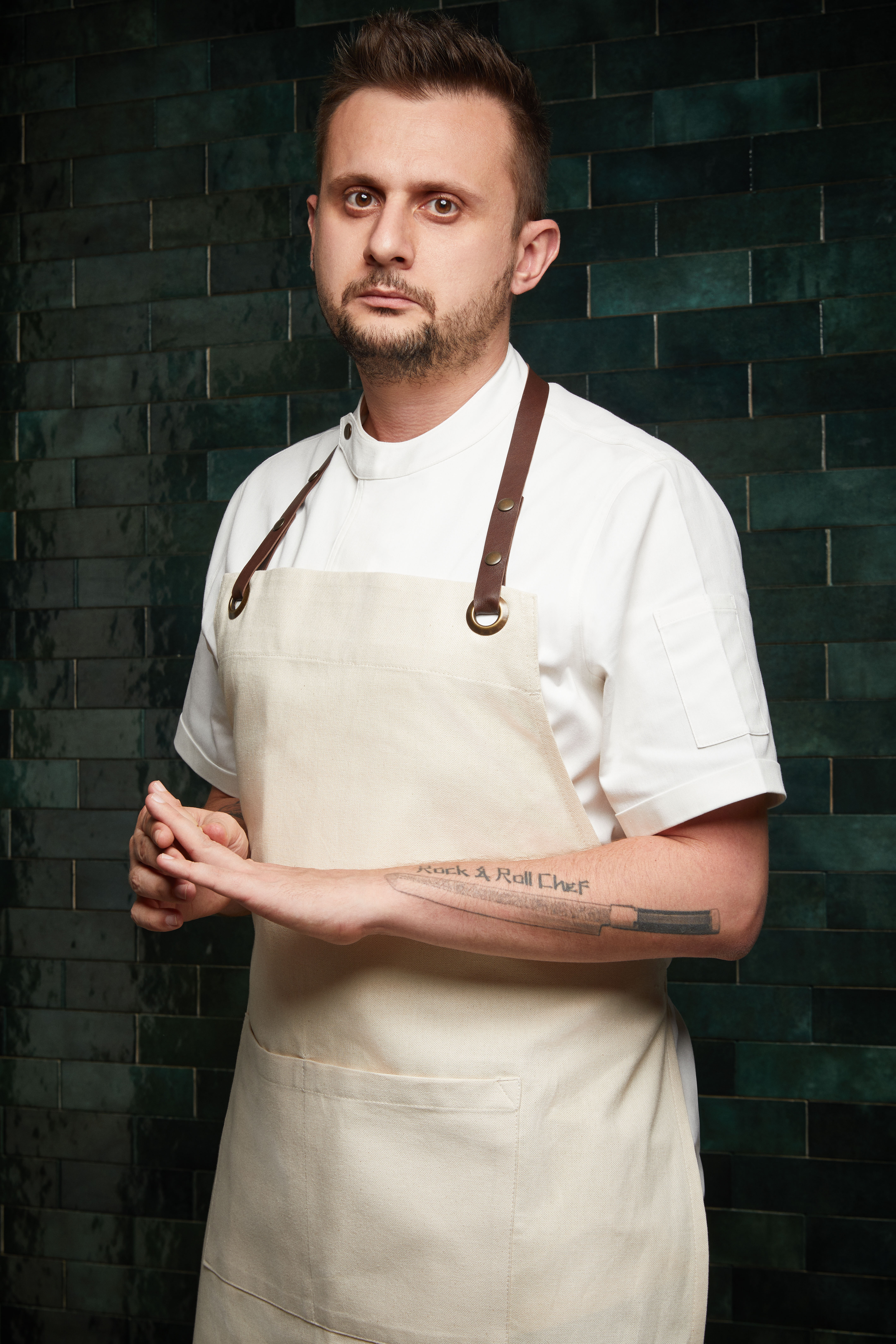
Fatih Tutak, chef and owner of TURK Fatih Tutak

As of the 2026 Michelin Guide (announced in December 2025), there are 17 restaurants in Turkey with a Michelin star rating.

The guide was first launched in Turkey in 2023, initially reviewing restaurants in Istanbul. In 2024, the selection expanded to include Bodrum and İzmir Province. The 2026 edition further extended the guide's reach to the Cappadocia region in Central Anatolia. In 2027, the guide will expand to cover the entirety of the country.

TURK Fatih Tutak and Vino Locale are currently the only restaurants in the country to hold a two-star rating. Several establishments also hold a Michelin Green Star for sustainable gastronomy, including Neolokal and Vino Locale.

== List ==
Key
1 Michelin star	One Michelin star
2 Michelin stars	Two Michelin stars
—	The restaurant did not receive a star that year

Michelin-starred restaurants
Name	Cuisine	Location	2023	2024	2025	2026
Araf	Turkish	Istanbul – Kadıköy	—	—	—	1 Michelin star
Araka	Creative	Istanbul – Sarıyer	1 Michelin star	1 Michelin star	1 Michelin star	1 Michelin star
Arkestra	Fusion	Istanbul – Beşiktaş	—	1 Michelin star	1 Michelin star	1 Michelin star
Casa Lavanda	Mediterranean	Istanbul – Şile	—	—	1 Michelin star	1 Michelin star
Kitchen	Modern	Bodrum – Yalıkavak	—	1 Michelin star	1 Michelin star	1 Michelin star
Maçakızı	Mediterranean	Bodrum – Göltürkbükü	—	1 Michelin star	1 Michelin star	1 Michelin star
Mezra Yalıkavak	Turkish	Bodrum – Yalıkavak	—	—	—	1 Michelin star
Mikla	Mediterranean	Istanbul – Beyoğlu	1 Michelin star	1 Michelin star	1 Michelin star	1 Michelin star
Narımor	Turkish	İzmir – Urla	—	—	1 Michelin star	1 Michelin star
Neolokal	Turkish	Istanbul – Beyoğlu	1 Michelin star	1 Michelin star	1 Michelin star	1 Michelin star
Nicole	Turkish	Istanbul – Beyoğlu	1 Michelin star	1 Michelin star	1 Michelin star	1 Michelin star
OD Urla	French	İzmir – Urla	—	1 Michelin star	1 Michelin star	1 Michelin star
Revithia	Turkish	Nevşehir – Ürgüp	—	—	—	1 Michelin star
Sankai by Nagaya	Japanese	Istanbul – Beşiktaş	—	1 Michelin star	1 Michelin star	1 Michelin star
Teruar Urla	Mediterranean	İzmir – Urla	—	1 Michelin star	1 Michelin star	1 Michelin star
TURK Fatih Tutak	Turkish	Istanbul – Şişli	2 Michelin stars	2 Michelin stars	2 Michelin stars	2 Michelin stars
Vino Locale	Turkish	İzmir – Urla	—	1 Michelin star	1 Michelin star	2 Michelin stars
Reference						

== Criticism ==
In 2025, the guide was criticized for omitting restaurants in key, densely populated regions such as Ankara (Turkey's capital city) and Antalya.

=== Institutional and independence concerns ===
The Michelin Guide's entry into the Turkish market has been criticized by gastronomic publications such as Gastromondiale for its reliance on "Destination Marketing Agreements." Critics, including Vedat Milor, have argued that because the guide's operations in Turkey are funded by tourism ministries or development agencies, its independence may be compromised. It has been alleged that these financial arrangements create a "who pays the piper calls the tune" dynamic, where the guide's priority shifts toward pleasing donors rather than maintaining objective global standards.

=== Methodological criticism ===
Further criticism focuses on the "hasty" nature of the Turkish evaluations, which some experts claim are riddled with contradictions and significant omissions. For instance, highly regarded restaurants like Nazende, Fauna, and Basta! Bistro were noted for not receiving stars despite their culinary substance, while other establishments were perceived as receiving accolades based on their adherence to "Western style" codes such as long tasting menus, expensive presentation, and theatrical staging rather than intrinsic food quality. This has led to a debate on whether the Michelin "star" represents absolute culinary excellence or merely a standardized, market-driven format that favors luxury over traditional Anatolian craft.

== See also ==
- List of restaurants in Istanbul
- List of Turkish restaurants
