= List of restaurants in Istanbul =

This is a list of notable restaurants in Istanbul. It includes a listing of notable cafés. Istanbul is the most populous city in Turkey.

Name	Location	Est.	Food type	Cuisine	Ref.
1924 Rejans	Beyoğlu	1924	Fine	Russian	
Ayaspaşa Rus	Beyoğlu Taksim	1943	Homemade food	Russian	
Beyti	Bakırköy Florya	1945	Kebab	Turkish	
Changa	Beyoğlu Taksim	1999	Homemade food	Fusion	
Güney Restaurant	Beyoğlu	1964			
Hacı Abdullah	Beyoğlu	1888	Homemade food	Ottoman	
Hafız Mıstafa	Fatih	1864	Dessert	Turkish	
Hünkar	Şişli Nişantaşı	1950	Kebab	Ottoman	
Kanaat	Üsküdar	1933	Homemade food	Turkish	
Konyalı	Fatih, Sirkeci	1897	Homemade food	Turkish	
Lebon (^{1})	Beyoğlu	1810	Pastry	French	
Mikla	Beyoğlu	2005	Fine	Turkish	
Pandeli	Fatih Eminönü	1901	Homemade food	Turkish	
Sultanahmet Köftecisi	Fatih	1920	Kofta	Turkish	
Espressolab	Istanbul Bilgi University	2014	Coffee	Café	
Food Palace 1981	Fatih	1981	Kebab	Turkish	
Simit Sarayı		2002	Homemade food	Turkish	

-(^{1}): Closed in 2022

== See also ==
- List of Michelin-starred restaurants in Turkey
