= Sofra (restaurant) =

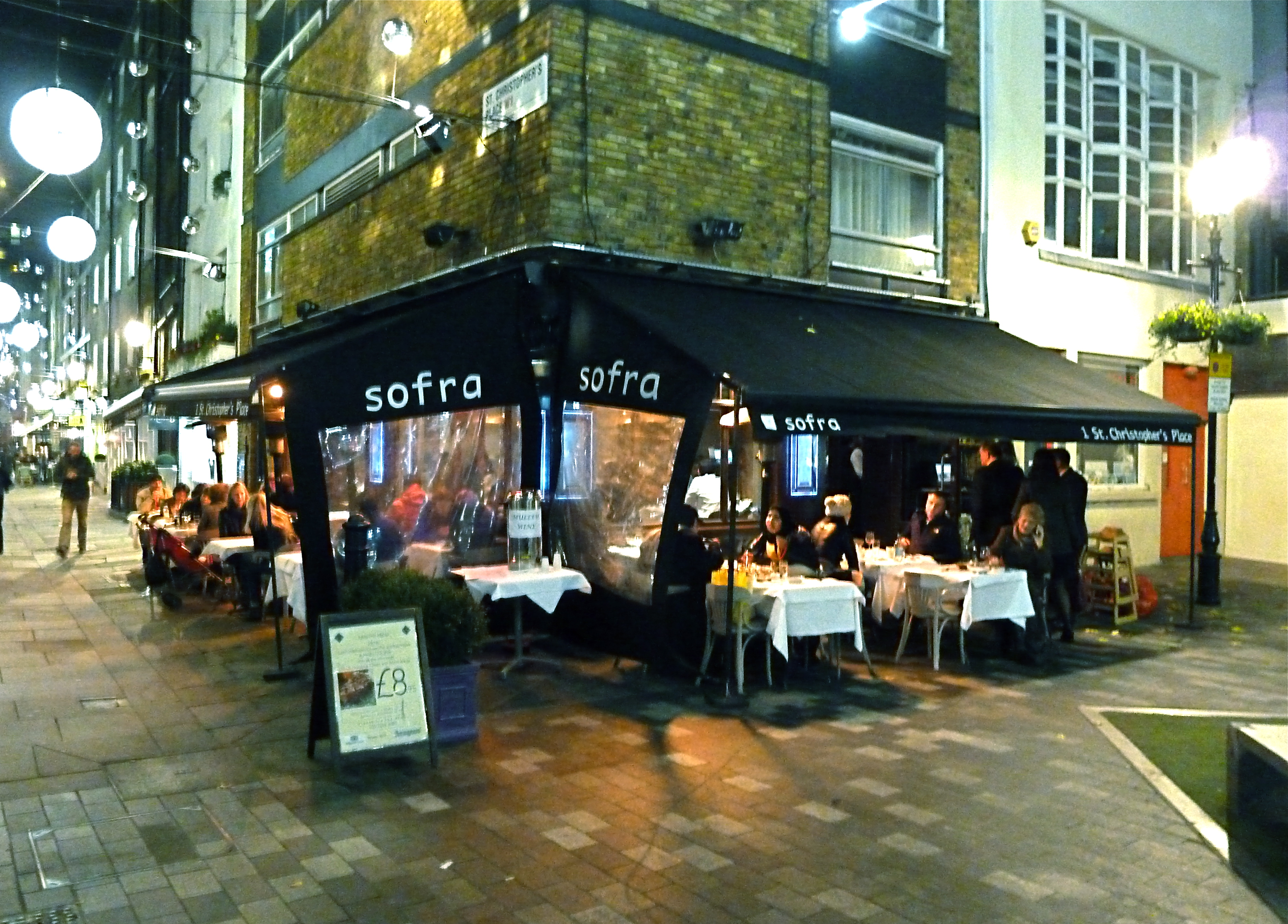

Restaurant information
- Established: 1981
- Owner: Hüseyin Özer
- Chef: Hüseyin Özer
- Food type: Turkish cuisine
- Location: 18 Shepherd Street (Sofra Mayfair); 1 St Christopher's Place (Sofra St Christopher's Place), London, United Kingdom
- Website: www.sofra.co.uk

The Sofra (meaning dining table in Turkish) is a restaurant chain in London, United Kingdom, which serves Turkish cuisine. The chef patron is Hüseyin Özer. It was established in 1981 as a small restaurant, which turned later into a chain of restaurants, currently in Mayfair and St Christopher's Place, off Oxford Street. Sofra restaurants are regarded the best Turkish cuisine restaurants outside Turkey, ranking first in a list published by the newspaper Hürriyet.

The restaurants are simple decorated. Özer declares the reason why there are no paintings on the walls and no music with the words that "his guests are distinguished, who deserve good food, and they go to art galleries or music halls when they wish to enjoy the best of art or music".

Typical Turkish cuisine meze and salads served before main course are fried eggplant, börek (baked filled pastries), falafel (deep-fried ball made from ground chickpeas, broad beans/horse beans), grilled sujuk in addition to broad bean/horse bean, cacık (cucumber with yogurt, dried mint and olive oil), hummus (cooked, mashed chickpeas blended with tahini, garlic in olive oil), baba ghanoush (eggplant mashed and mixed with paprika, garlic in olive oil), tabbouleh (bulgur, tomatoes, cucumbers, finely chopped parsley with onion, garlic in olive oil).

Hüseyin Özer owned an upscale restaurant, named "Özer" after himself, which was located in London's Oxford Circus. It was announced that this restaurant would be closed after its 14-year existence on 20 December 2013 because the lease contract was not extended.

== See also ==
- List of Turkish restaurants
