= Hüseyin Özer =

- Born: 1949 (age 75–76); Reşadiye, Tokat Province
- Culinary career
- Cooking style: Turkish, Ottoman
- Current restaurant(s): Sofra Mayfair, Sofra St Christopher's Place, "Sofra London" Karaköy, Istanbul, Turkey
- Award(s) won: World Food Prize 2011 Entrepreneur of the Year
- Website: huseyinozer.com

Hüseyin Özer (born 1949 in Reşadiye, Tokat Province, Turkey) is a Turkish British executive chef and restaurateur, who owns a restaurant chain based in London.

== Early life ==
Hüseyin Özer was born in 1949, in a village of the Reşadiye town, in Tokat Province situated in northern Turkey. His parents separated when he was very young. Unwanted by his parents, Özer was raised by his grandfather. Unable to attend primary school, he taught himself to read and write.

Working in his village as a shepherd, Özer was sent at the age of eleven, to Ankara in order to earn money, where he became a street kid. To learn English, he bought books. In 1967, he moved to Istanbul, where he found employment in restaurants as a dish washer. He continued to learn English, by paying a tutor to teach him.

Following his military service, Hüseyin went to London in 1975, by bus, as he could not afford to fly there. There, he worked in a döner kebab shop in Mayfair and attended English courses in his spare time.

== Career ==
Özer acquired the döner kebab shop he was working in, and turned it into a restaurant in 1981. His success paved the way for him to open more London restaurants, called "Sofra" (in Turkish dining table), in Covent Garden, Mayfair, Regent Street and St John's Wood. Each restaurant is unique. The menus consist of typical mezes, kebabs and desserts of Turkish cuisine.

He owns up to twenty cafés and restaurants in several locations in London. However, his current focus remains on the two fine dining restaurants.

In addition to his restaurant business, chef Özer runs a catering service company.

Özer has an estimated personal fortune of £37 million, according to television programme, The World's Richest People.

== Social life ==
Dedicated to education, Özer established a trust in Ankara in his early years, which turned into a foundation named "Hüseyin Özer Education Foundation". In a partnership program with Middlesex University, he teaches students how to open and run successful restaurants. He has contributed to the Turkish-English Chamber of Commerce.

== Recognition ==
In 2011, Özer was honoured with the Entrepreneur of the Year award by the Star Network at the World Food Awards. In 2007–2008, his restaurant in Regent Street was recommended by Michelin Guide.

He is one of the three Turkish people who was featured in the Discovery Channel's programme World's Richest People.

In 2011, Hüseyin Özer was given an honorary Doctorate of Letters by the University of Westminster.

== Book ==
- Özer, Hüseyin (1998). Sofra Cookbook. HarperCollins Publishers Ltd. p. 144. ISBN 978-0722536827.
