= List of Turkish restaurants =

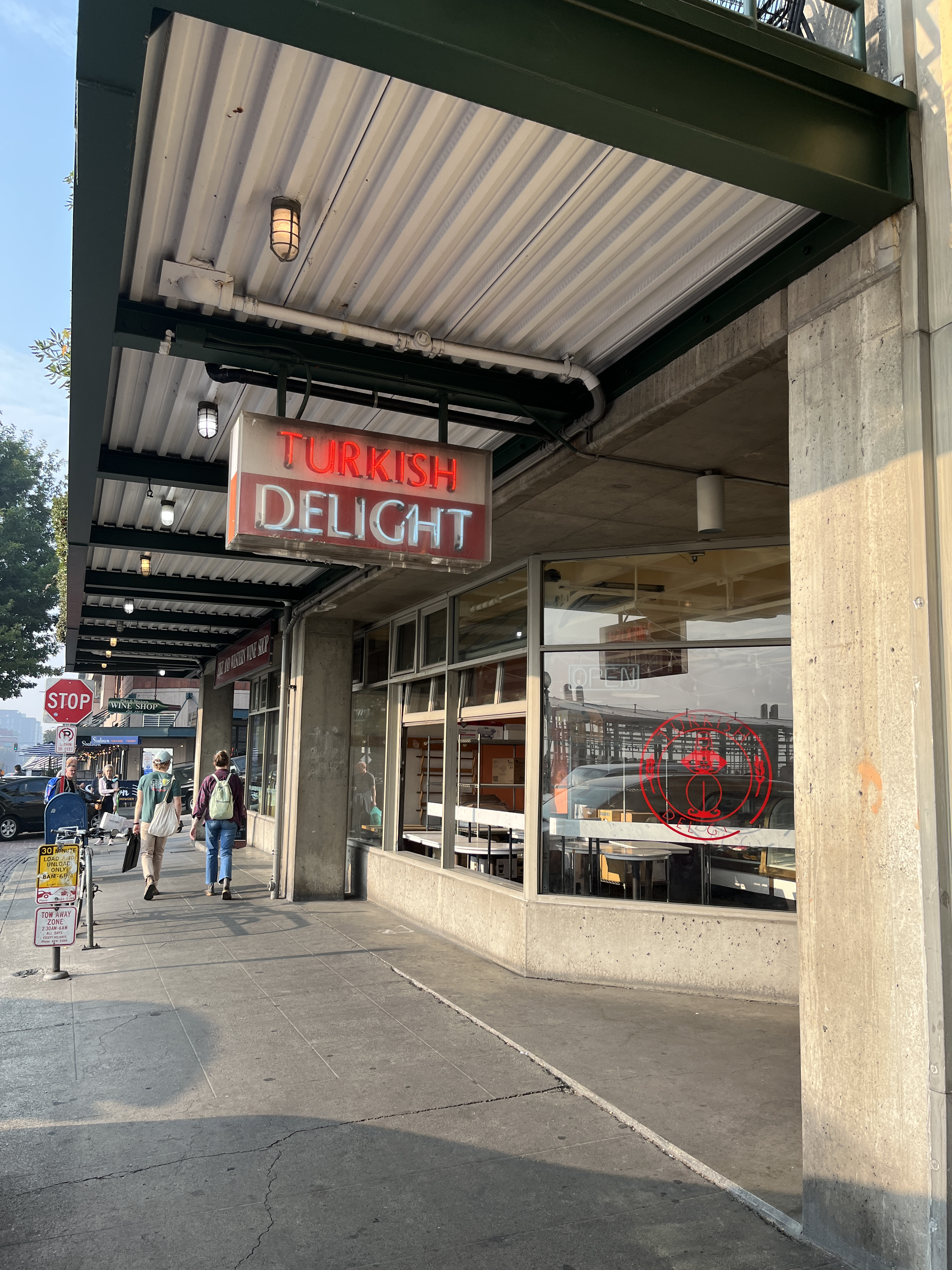
Turkish Delight, Seattle

Following is a list of notable restaurants known for serving Turkish cuisine:

- BigChefs, Ankara
- Dede, Baltimore, County Cork Ireland
- Hamdi, Seattle
- Hünkar, Nişantaşı, Istanbul, Turkey
- Mado, Kahramanmaraş, Turkey
- Meetpoint, Waterloo, Ontario, Canada
- Neolokal, Istanbul, Turkey
- Nicole, Istanbul, Turkey
- Sofra, London, United Kingdom
- TURK Fatih Tutak, Istanbul, Turkey
- Turkish Delight, Seattle
- Vino Locale, Istanbul, Turkey

== See also ==
- List of Michelin-starred restaurants in Turkey
