= TURK Fatih Tutak =

Michelin-starred restaurant in Istanbul

- Interactive map of TURK Fatih Tutak

Restaurant information
- Established: 2019
- Chef: Fatih Tutak
- Rating: (Michelin Guide); 18,5/20 (Gault Millau)
- Location: Istanbul, Turkey
- Coordinates: 41°03′30.4″N 28°58′39.7″E
- Website: turkft.com

TURK Fatih Tutak is a restaurant in Istanbul, Turkey, offering a fine dining experience. Opened in 2019 and managed and chef-owned by Fatih Tutak, it was the first restaurant in Turkey to receive two Michelin Stars, a distinction it now shares with Vino Locale as of the 2026 guide Michelin Stars.

== See also ==
- List of Michelin-starred restaurants in Turkey
- List of Turkish restaurants
