= Arkestra (restaurant) =

Michelin-starred restaurant in Istanbul, Turkey

- Interactive map of Arkestra

Restaurant information
- Established: September 2022
- Chef: Cenk Debensason
- Food type: Fusion
- Rating: (Michelin Guide} 15,5/20 (Gault Millau)
- Location: Istanbul, Turkey
- Coordinates: 41.078489°N 29.031467°E
- Website: arkestra.com.tr

Arkestra is a Michelin-starred restaurant located in the Etiler neighborhood of Istanbul, Turkey. Established in late 2022 by Chef Cenk Debensason and partner Debora İpekel, the establishment is situated in a restored 1960s villa. It is recognized for its "Modern European" cuisine, which integrates classical French techniques with global influences.

== History and Design ==
The restaurant was founded by Cenk Debensason, who trained at the Institut Paul Bocuse, and Debora İpekel, a former music industry executive. The venue is a standalone 1960s residential villa renovated by architect Tayfun Mumcu. The interior design features Art Deco chandeliers and wooden wall paneling, evoking a "relaxed opulence" aesthetic.

The establishment is divided into three distinct areas:

- Arkestra Restaurant: The main dining area focusing on seasonal tasting and à la carte menus, which also extends to an outdoor courtyard.
- Ritmo: A casual bistro offering shared plates and cocktails.
- The Listening Room: An upper-floor audiophile bar featuring high-fidelity sound systems and a curated record collection.

== Cuisine ==
Chef Debensason’s culinary approach utilizes a French technical base for dishes that incorporate diverse cultural influences. Signature dishes include tuna sashimi with sushi rice ice cream and seared sea bass with a Thai-inspired sauce. The beverage program includes a selection of niche Turkish varietals and old-world wines.

== Recognition ==
In 2023, Arkestra was awarded one Michelin Star in the 2024 Michelin Guide for Istanbul, an accolade it maintained in the 2025–2026 edition. The restaurant also holds 3 Toques (15.5/20) from Gault & Millau Turkey.

== See also ==
- List of Michelin-starred restaurants in Turkey
- List of restaurants in Istanbul
