= Khirapat =

Food

Khirapat is a sweet Prasad. It is an offering commonly made by Maharashtrian families for Ganesha.

Khirapat is made from grated dried coconut, misri, dried fruits such as kismis, and nuts such as cashew and badam.
