= Alpal =

Sri Lankan confectionery

Älpäl
- Alternative names: Sakaramoṭan
- Type: Confectionery
- Place of origin: Sri Lanka
- Main ingredients: jaggery/sugar, water

Älpäl, also known as Sakaramoṭan, is a traditional Sri Lankan confectionery. It is similar to pulled jaggery or taffy.

In 1886 Ceylonese Crown Counsel, Louis Nell, in his explanatory list of Portuguese words adopted by the Sinhalese defines älpäl as being a preparation of sugar, vended in the streets by the Chinese and now Tamils. He goes further to state that it comes in two forms of long pieces either resembling the English confectionary known as rock sugar or butterscotch.

Älpäl is considered to be derived from the Portuguese term alfeloa or alfelos, which is described as "clarified sugar flavoured with scented water, boiled until it forms a hard ball, kneaded on a marble slab and pulled, allowed to harden and then broken up".
