= Güney Restaurant =

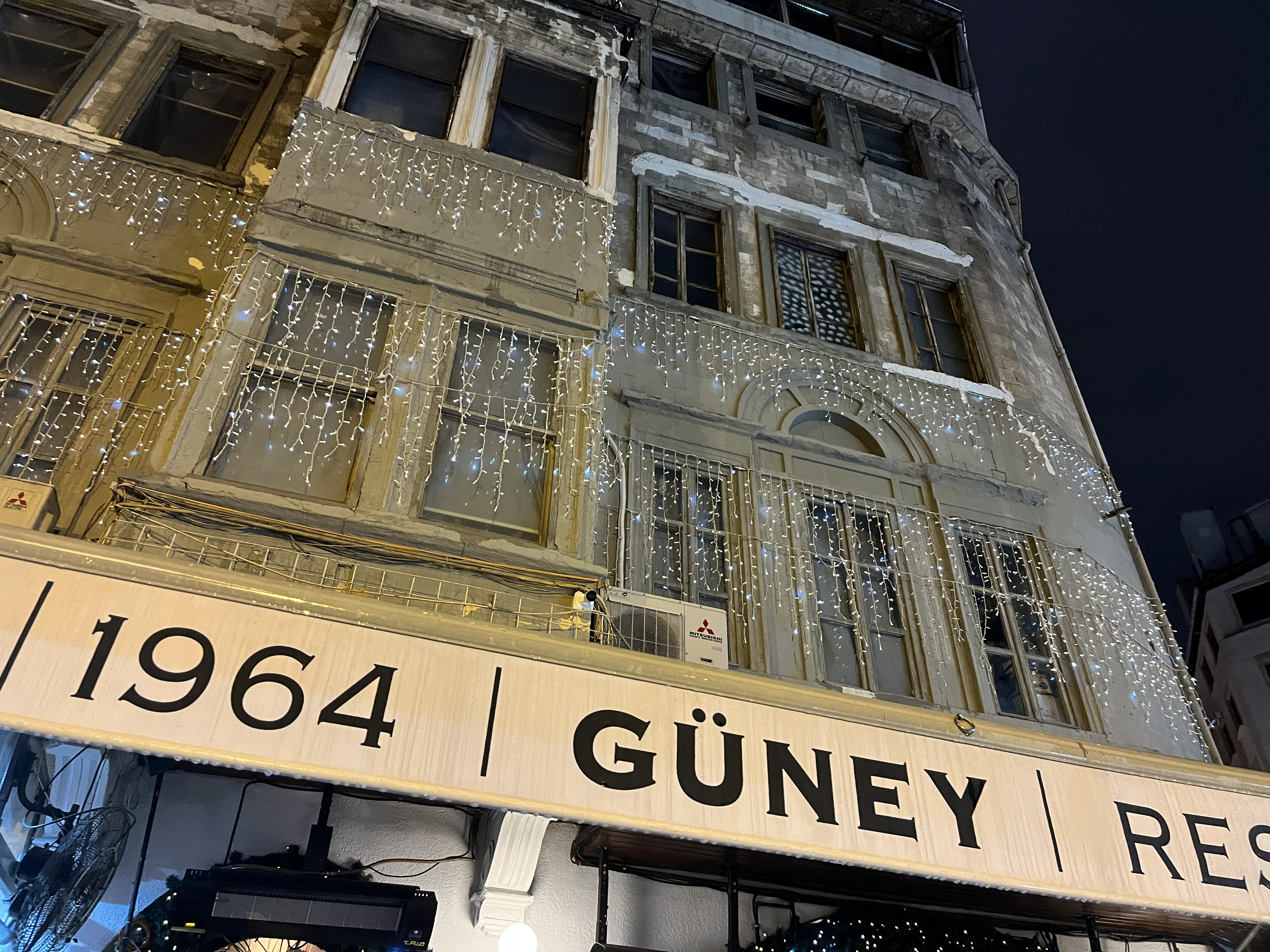
- The restaurant's exterior, 2023

Restaurant information
- Established: 1964
- Location: Istanbul, Turkey
- Website: guneyrestaurant.com

Güney Restaurant is a restaurant in Beyoğlu, Istanbul, Turkey. The business was established in 1964.

== See also ==
- List of restaurants in Istanbul
