= Mehmet Gürs =

Turkish-Finnish chef (born 1969)

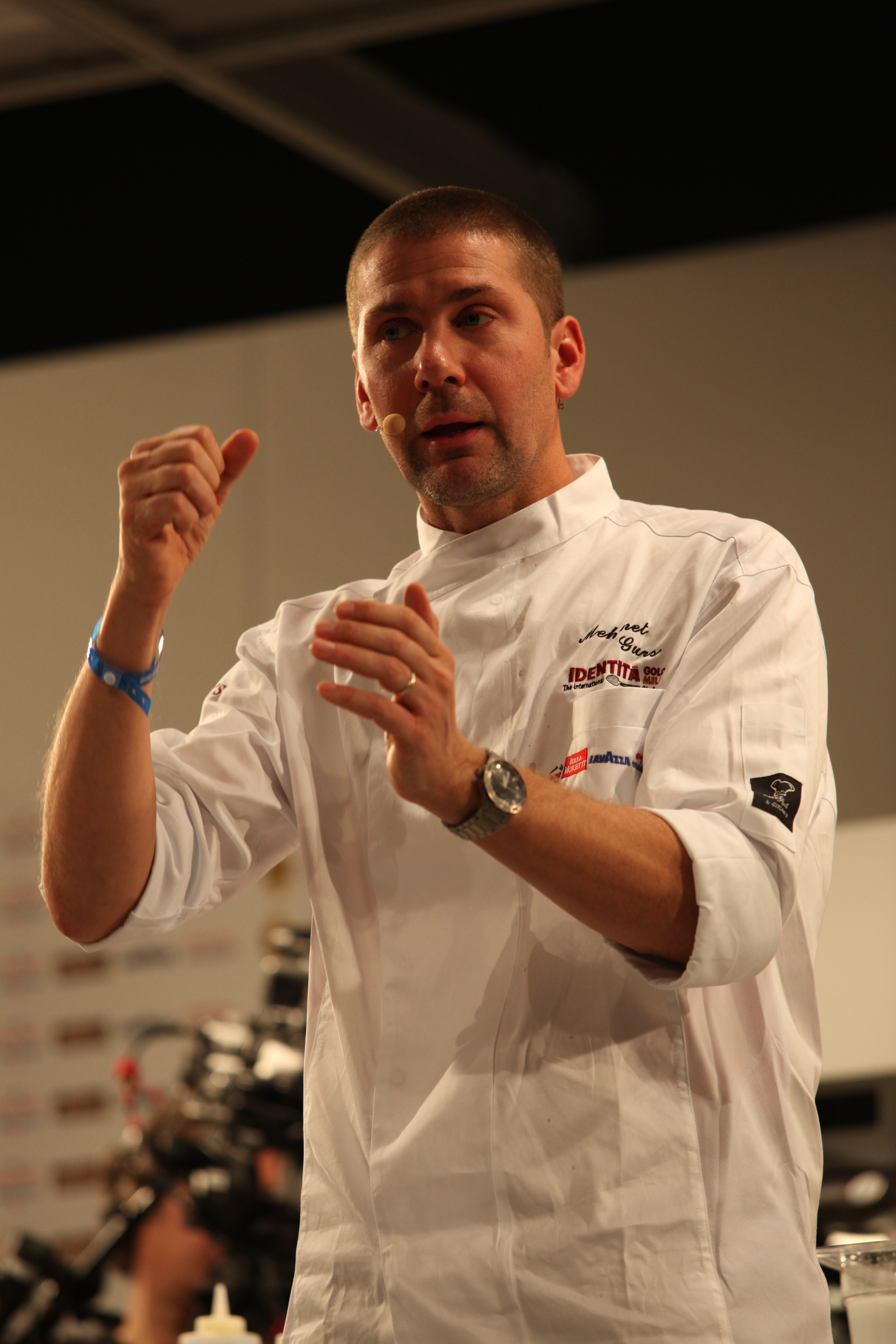
- Gürs in 2011
- Born: Mehmet Gürs; 13 December 1969 (age 56); Ekenäs, Finland
- Culinary career
- Cooking style: Turkish/Finnish
- Current restaurants
- Mikla (Istanbul); Num Num Cafe & Restaurant (7 branches)

Mehmet Gürs (born 13 December 1969) is a Finnish celebrity chef, television personality, restaurateur and consultant. He is considered to be Istanbul's most recognizable chef.

== Biography ==
Gürs was born in Finland to a Turkish father and a Swedish-speaking Finnish mother and grew up in Stockholm and Istanbul. He spent eight years training and working as a chef in the United States; from 1990 to 1993 he studied Hotel, Restaurant and Institutional Management at Johnson & Wales University. In the mid-1990s, he returned to Turkey to start his first restaurant called Downtown; six years later he opened Lokanta and then Mikla in 2005.

Gürs's Istanbul Food & Beverage Group now consists of Mikla, the numnum café & restaurant, Trattoria Enzo, Kronotrop, Terra Kitchen chain and the group's research lab, the workshop.

== Awards ==
- 2001: Best Restaurant/ Downtown - TimeOut Istanbul
- 2002: Best Bar/ NuTeras - TimeOut Istanbul
- 2003: Best Chef/Mehmet Gürs - TimeOut Istanbul
- 2004: Best Bar/ NuTeras - TimeOut Istanbul
- 2006: Best Restaurant/ Mikla - TimeOut Istanbul

== Personal life ==
Gürs has one child. He speaks Swedish, Turkish, French, and English.
