= Araka (restaurant) =

Michelin-starred restaurant in Istanbul, Turkey

- Interactive map of Araka

Restaurant information
- Established: 2018
- Chef: Zeynep Pınar Taşdemir
- Food type: Turkish
- Rating: (Michelin Guide); 15/20 (Gault Millau)
- Location: Kapalı Bakkal Sokak No:8, Istanbul, 34464, Turkey
- Coordinates: 41°07′02″N 29°03′47″E
- Website: araka.com.tr

Araka is a Michelin-starred restaurant located in the Yeniköy district of Sarıyer, Istanbul, Turkey. Established in 2018 by chef Zeynep Pınar Taşdemir, it is recognized for its creative, vegetable-forward approach to modern Turkish cuisine.

== Concept and cuisine ==
Situated in a historic-style building with a secluded rear terrace, Araka's name is derived from the Turkish word for "pea" (araka), reflecting the chef's focus on seasonal vegetables and herbs. The restaurant's culinary philosophy emphasizes the use of local, regional produce, often creating a balance between spicy, savory, and tangy flavors. Chef Taşdemir is known for her original style that prioritizes "simplicity and purity," often using minimal intervention to allow the natural flavors of the ingredients to stand out.

== Awards ==
In 2022, Araka was among the first group of restaurants in Istanbul to receive one Michelin Star in the guide's debut selection for the city. It also holds a rating of 15/20 from the Gault Millau Turkey guide.

== See also ==
- List of Michelin-starred restaurants in Turkey
