= Hacı Abdullah Restaurant =

- Location of Hacı Abdullah Restaurant in Istanbul

Restaurant information
- Established: 1888
- Food type: Ottoman court cuisine
- Location: Hüseyin Ağa Mah., Atıf Yılmaz Cad. 9/A, 34435 Beyoğlu, Istanbul, Turkey
- Coordinates: 41°02′07″N 28°58′49″E
- Website: www.haciabdullah.com.tr

The Hacı Abdullah Restaurant (Turkish: Hacı Abdullah Lokantası) is a historic traditional restaurant in Istanbul, Turkey, specialized in Ottoman court cuisine and Turkish cuisine. It was established in Karaköy, Istanbul in 1888, and since 1916 has been situated in different places in Beyoğlu, Istanbul.

== History ==
The restaurant was established in 1888 by Hacı Abdullah Efendi at the Karaköy Quay in Istanbul, under the name Abdullah Efendi Lokantası during the final period of the Ottoman Empire. The business license was issued by the Ottoman sultan Abdul Hamid II (r. 1876–1909) in person. It became the first officially registered restaurant in Turkey. After 1916, the restaurant was relocated due to an earthquake that had an epicenter close to its original location. The restaurant was relocated again in 1940 to the Sadri Alışık Sok., close to the Turkish cinema business in Beyoğlu, and was renamed Hacı Salih Lokantası. In 1958, the restaurant, known up to that point as Abdullah Efendi ve Hacı Salih Lokantası, moved to its current place. Finally in 1983, the restaurant restored its original name of Hacı Abdullah Restaurant.

In June 2016, Hacı Abdullah Restaurant opened a branch in Ankara to serve the crew of the General Directorate of Forestry in Ankara.

Throughout its history, the Hacı Abdullah Restaurant has been frequently visited by rulers, state officials, and high-ranked politicians, as well as by official and private delegates.

== Ownership ==
The century-old history of the Hacı Abdullah Restaurant is a continuation of the Ahi guild, a tradesman solidarity organization founded by the Bektashi Order preacher Ahi Evran (1169–1261), under the auspices of Hacı Bektaş-ı Veli (1209–1271). Ahi-Order businesses are long-established organizations that have been passed down from father to son or otherwise changed hands through purchase by individuals or companies against a fee. The situation at the Hacı Abdullah Restaurant is an exception to both cases, as it was passed down sometimes from master to apprentice.

When Abdullah Efendi died, his only son Hikmet Abdullah Bey took over the business. During this period, a branch was opened in a large garden in Emirgan, Istanbul, which was later closed. After Hikmet Bey's death, the restaurant was taken over by his next of kin, since he was childless. As the kin did not run the business, Hacı Salih Efendi took over it in 1943; he had worked long years in the restaurant. Abdullah Korun, who came to Istanbul from Siirt in 1962, started working with Salih Efendi in 1967. When Hacı Salih Efendi died in 1982, the restaurant was about to be vacated. Ferit İntiba, a businessman and regular customer named intervened and took ownership of the restaurant at the last minute. After some time, master chef Korun left when İntiba wanted alcoholic beverages to be served in the restaurant. As the business did not run well, İntiba was ousted, and Korun and his brigade de cuisine were called back. They continued to work in the old style and menu. The name Hacı Salih had to be changed due to Turkish business laws. In 1983, the place returned to its initial 1888 name of Hacı Abdullah Lokantası. Abdullah Korun and his partners took over the business completely in 1994. They eventually took ownership of the property, further enlarging the business and making it what it is today.

As of November 2022, the restaurant is run by Turgıt Gülen, the son of one of the four partners.

== Restaurant ==
As of November 2022, the Hacı Abdullah Restaurant is located at Atıf Yılmaz Cad. (formerly Sakızağacı Cad.), 9/A, in the neighborhood of Hüseyinağa in the Beyoğlu district of Istanbul, Turkey.

The restaurant's main hall is capable of serving 650 guests. In addition, there are special lounges of "Lale" ("Tulip") and "Karanfil VIP" ("Carnation VIP"), which are decorated with tiles of the traditional Ottoman art with a floral motif. The main personnel of the Hacı Abdullah Restaurant have 25 to 30 years of experience working there.

== Menu ==
Appreciating the responsibility of being the first licensed restaurant in Turkey, the owners of the Hacı Abdullah Restaurant offer traditional Ottoman cuisine and Turkish cuisine, preserving the recipes for meals that were prepared at the Ottoman court kitchen and the homes in Anatolia. "The variety of those dishes reach at least 6,000, and 250 kinds of dishes could be made from eggplant alone", according to master chef Abdullah. Most of the aforementioned dishes are still being served in the Hacı Abdullah Restaurant seasonally. From soups to olive oil dishes; from grills to meat and vegetable dishes; and from salads and desserts to traditional compotes; the Hacı Abdullah Restaurant prepares menus carefully from a selection of more than 500 dishes, in order to suit the guests' taste and also to accord with Ottoman court cuisine recipes. Among the most preferred dishes are hünkârbeğendi, Elbasan tava, lamb tandoori and lamb shank. The restaurant is renowned for its compotes, comprising 15 to 20 varieties of organic fruits.

All meals are cooked with ingredients brought in from their original regions in specially handcrafted 90-percent copper pots, using special cooking techniques. The third-generation owner of the restaurant states that "Copper pot allows the food cooking slowly, and cooling slowly. Food cooked in copper pot gets very delicious".
