= Novvot =

Variety of rock candy

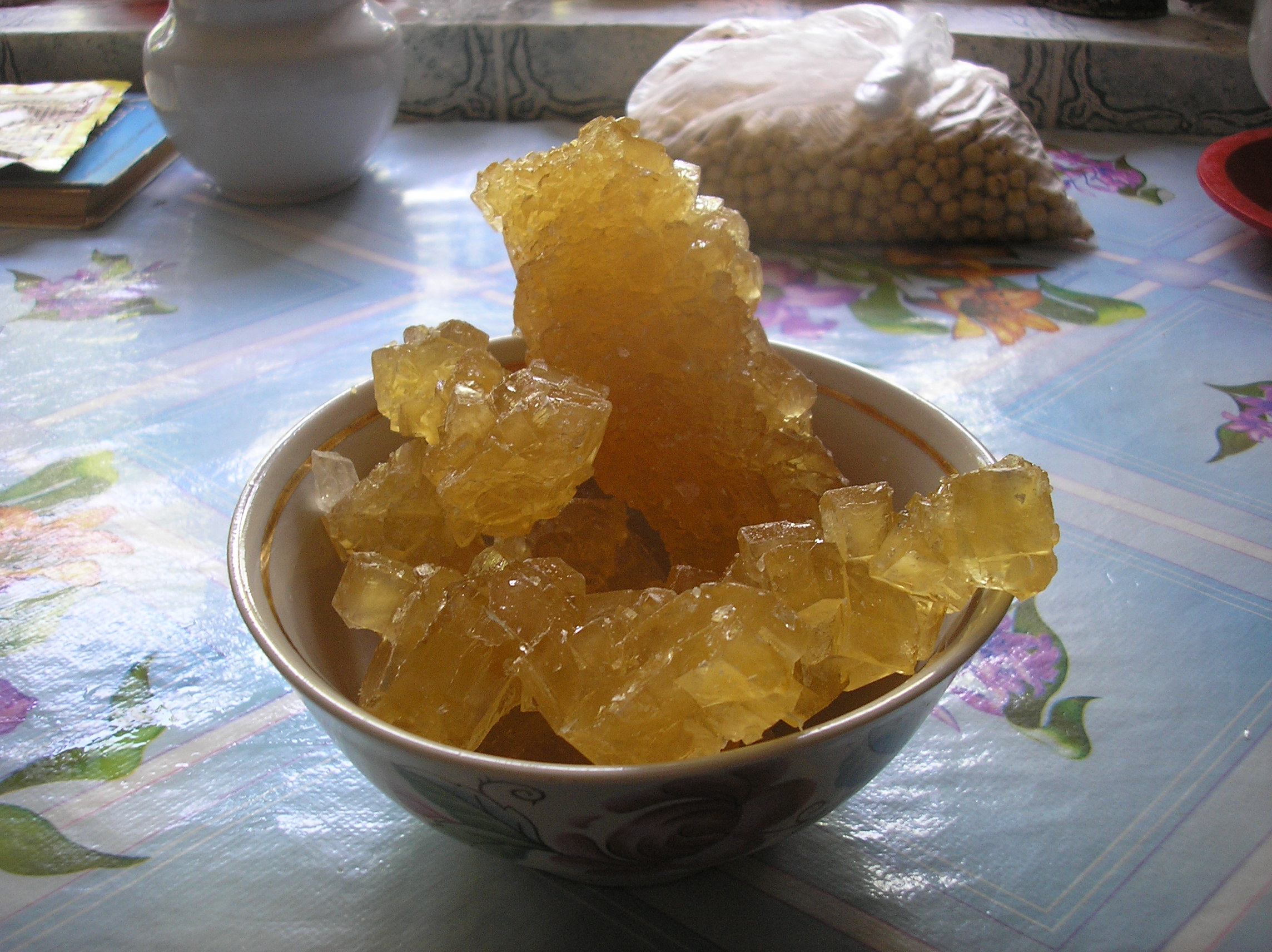
Novvot (nabat) crystals in a bowl

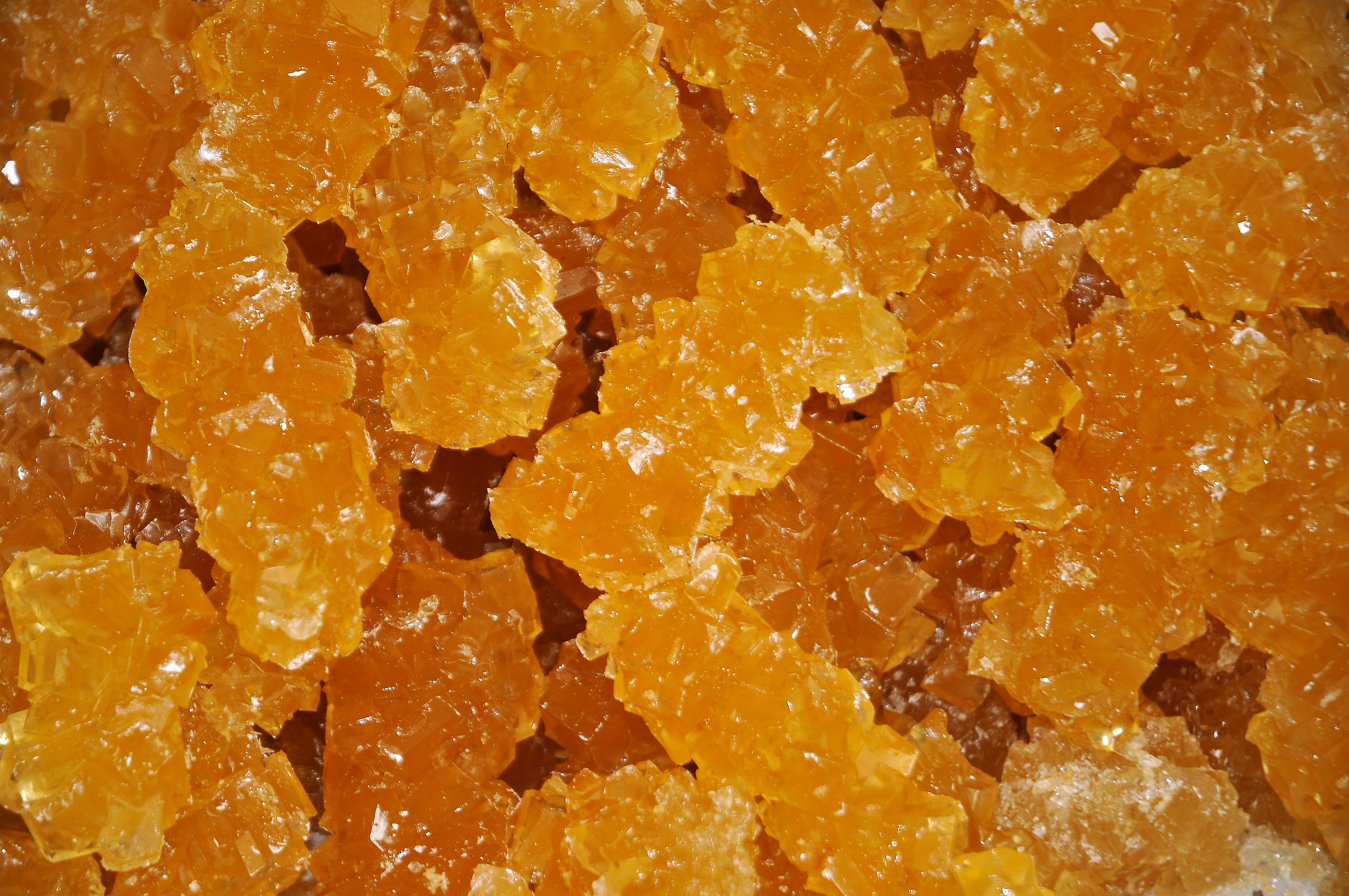
Novvot at Samarkand market

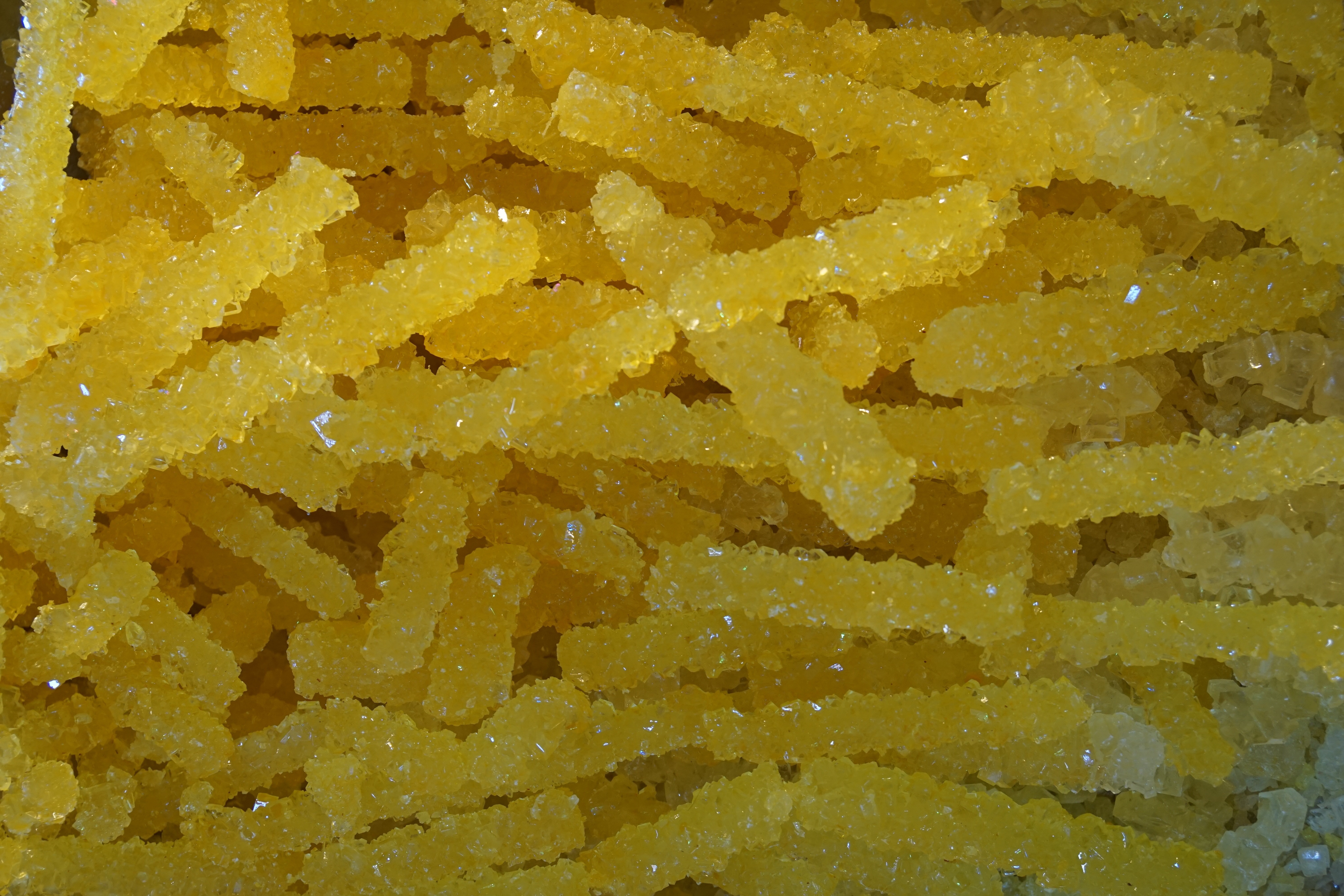
Strings of novvot (Persian sugar)

Novvot (/nəˈvɒt/ nə-VOT; Persian: نبات, romanized: nabāt [næˈbɒːt]), also known as nabat, navat, navot, kinvashakari, Persian sugar or Uzbek sugar, is a type of rock candy popular in Middle East, Near East and Central Asia, particularly Iran, Tajikistan and Uzbekistan. Novvot is prepared from sugar syrup (consisting of over 99% sucrose) and can be colorless or range from white to brownish-yellow.

== Preparation ==
To make novvot, liquid (water or grape juice) and white sugar are boiled, and then poured to a container with threads or sticks, around which novvot crystals form over the period of three days of cooling down. The threads could be made from eggs. For flavoring, saffron or (less often) honey are sometimes added. The former results in more bitter and golden-colored product. Other food coloring substances are sometimes used, which can raise food safety issues in case of the usage of unauthorized substances by small producers and vendors. The process usually results in formation of colorless, white or brownish-yellowish rock candy.

Novvot is 99% recrystallized sucrose formed from saturated syrup.

== Nutrition ==
Novvot has a similar caloric value to that of regular sugar. Uzbek novvot has been described as healthier than regular processed white or cane sugar on its own, as it contains about 60% natural monosaccharide fructose from the fruit juice used in its manufacture that does not require insulin for absorption, making it less harmful for diabetics.

=== In traditional medicine ===
According to folk beliefs and practices of traditional medicine in regions where novvot is popular, it is seen as a healthy type of snack, helpful for digestive problems, lactation and the restless legs syndrome.

== Economy ==
In Iran, most novvot (nabat) is produced in the Razavi Khorasan province, where in the 2020s over 210,000 tons of nabat was produced yearly.

== Cultural significance ==
Novvot is popular in Middle East, Near East and Central Asia, particularly Uzbekistan and Iran (in the latter, the term nabat is more often used). It has roots in Persian cuisine. It is often served together with tea during teatime or used as a sweetner for tea and other hot beverages. Traditionally, navvot was made by dedicated merchants in local settlements, rather than individual families.

Novvot has been described as one of instances of Uzbekistan's intangible cultural heritage by UNESCO.
