= OD Urla =

Michelin-starred restaurant in Urla, Turkey

- Interactive map of OD Urla

Restaurant information
- Chef: Osman Sezener
- Food type: Modern Aegean
- Dress code: Smart casual
- Rating: Michelin green star 16/20 (Gault Millau)
- Location: Urla, Turkey
- Coordinates: 38°20′41.3″N 26°45′44.2″E
- Website: odurla.com

OD Urla is a Michelin-starred restaurant located in Urla, İzmir, Turkey. Established in 2018 by chef Osman Sezener, it is known for its "farm-to-table" approach and modern interpretation of Aegean cuisine.

== Concept and cuisine ==
The restaurant is situated within a family-owned olive grove and operates with a sustainable, zero-waste philosophy. The name "OD" refers to "fire" (od in Old Turkish), reflecting the restaurant's primary cooking method over wood fire and charcoal using an open kitchen concept.

The menu focuses on seasonal ingredients sourced from the restaurant's own garden and local producers in the Urla region. While it incorporates modern techniques, its roots are deeply tied to traditional Aegean and Mediterranean flavors.

== Awards ==
In 2023, during the first-ever Michelin Guide selection for İzmir, OD Urla was awarded one Michelin Star and the Michelin Green Star for its commitment to sustainable gastronomy. It also holds a rating of 16/20 from the Gault Millau guide.

== See also ==
- List of Michelin-starred restaurants in Turkey
