= Meetpoint =

Turkish restaurant in Waterloo, Canada

- Interactive map of Meetpoint

Restaurant information
- Established: 2009, 2020
- Owner: Ugur Akdogan
- Food type: Turkish
- Location: 1 The Boardwalk, #400, Waterloo, Ontario, Canada
- Coordinates: 43.43908°N 80.56410°W
- Website: meetpoint.ca

Meetpoint (stylized in all lowercase) is a Turkish restaurant in Waterloo, Ontario, Canada, at 1 The Boardwalk, #400.

== History ==
Ugur Akdogan is a Turkish Canadian who moved to Canada in 2000. Meetpoint was opened by Akdogan as an eatery in the University Plaza (near the University of Waterloo) in 2009. The restaurant closed in 2015 after Akdogan did not renew his lease. They reopened the restaurant under the same name in January 2020, with Akdogan's relatives Mensure and Selim Yarar helping run it. According to Akdogan, the new location is "classier," and "targeted more towards business clientele and families". Due to COVID-19 lockdowns the restaurant temporarily closed three months after opening. Through limited seating capacity and a patio, the business was able to do "decently", according to Akdogan.

== Food ==
The restaurant bakes flatbreads "fresh in a stone-fired oven". For drinks, tea, beer, wine, Yeni Raki, and liquor are served. For appetizers, options include hummus, borek, shakshuka and stuffed grape leaves, while options for main dishes include fish, lamb, chicken, beef kebab, and kofte. Some desserts served include baklava and sekerpare.

== Reception ==
Jasmine Mangalaseril of The Waterloo Region Record reviewed the restaurant in 2021, and praised the hospitality, food, and menu. Later, in Mangalaseril's 2021 year-end food summary, she praised Meetpoint for having the "Most Memorable Starter" of the year, the grilled eggplant salad.

== See also ==
- List of Turkish restaurants
