= Sankai by Nagaya =

Michelin-starred Japanese restaurant in Istanbul, Turkey

- Interactive map of Sankai by Nagaya

Restaurant information
- Established: March 2023
- Chef: Yoshizumi Nagaya
- Food type: Japanese
- Rating: (Michelin Guide); 15/20 (Gault Millau)
- Location: Cevdet Paşa Caddesi No:34, Beşiktaş, Istanbul, Turkey
- Coordinates: 41°04′40.5″N 29°02′38.9″E
- Website: sankai.com.tr

Sankai by Nagaya is a Michelin-starred Japanese restaurant located in the Bebek neighborhood of Istanbul, Turkey. Situated on the third floor of the historic Bebek Hotel, the restaurant is a partnership between Turkish entrepreneur Can Yıldırım and Michelin-starred chef Yoshizumi Nagaya. It is the first restaurant in Turkey to serve a combination of Kaiseki and Edomae-style sushi. In 2023, within months of its opening, it was awarded one Michelin Star.

== Concept and Design ==
Designed by Mahmut Anlar and GeoID, the restaurant's interior reflects a "home-away-from-home" atmosphere, blending traditional Japanese aesthetics with modernist touches. The venue is highly exclusive, with a seating capacity limited to 24 guests.

The culinary philosophy is built on the "Harmony of Three," representing the collaboration between Executive Chef Yoshizumi Nagaya, Head Sushi Chef Hiroko Shibata, and the local hospitality team led by Can Yıldırım. The restaurant emphasizes the Omotenashi (Japanese hospitality) principle, offering two distinct tasting menus that change seasonally.

== Cuisine ==
Sankai by Nagaya specializes in two traditional Japanese culinary arts:

- Kaiseki: A multi-course haute cuisine that emphasizes seasonality and artistic presentation, overseen by Yoshizumi Nagaya, who gained international fame with his Michelin-starred restaurant in Düsseldorf.
- Edomae Sushi: A technique originating from the Edo period, involving cured or marinated fish. This section is led by Hiroko Shibata, one of the few female master sushi chefs in the industry.

The restaurant sources high-quality local ingredients from Turkish waters while importing specialized Japanese products to maintain authenticity.

== Controversies ==
In 2024, the restaurant's location, Bebek Hotel, and its owner Muzaffer Yıldırım, were subject to significant media allegations regarding unauthorized surveillance of high-profile guests. Reports suggested that businessmen and public figures were secretly recorded for potential blackmail or espionage purposes. Further coverage alleged that these surveillance activities were systematic, describing the situation as a "espionage activity" targeting leaders of major holding companies.

== See also ==
- List of Japanese restaurants
- List of Michelin-starred restaurants in Turkey
