= Nicole (restaurant) =

Restaurant in Istanbul, Turkey

- Interactive map of Nicole

Restaurant information
- Chef: Serkan Aksoy
- Food type: Turkish
- Rating: (Michelin Guide); 15/20 (Gault Millau)
- Location: Istanbul, Turkey
- Coordinates: 41.0302°N 28.9777°E
- Website: nicole.com.tr

Nicole is a Michelin-starred fine-dining restaurant located in the Beyoğlu district of Istanbul, Turkey. Situated on the terrace of Tomtom Suites in the historical Tomtom neighborhood, the restaurant offers views of the Historical Peninsula and the Marmara Sea. Established in 2013, it was originally known for its French-influenced cuisine under founding chef Aylin Yazıcıoğlu. Since late 2021, the restaurant has been led by Executive Chef Serkan Aksoy, focusing on contemporary Anatolian cuisine. In 2022, Nicole became one of the first restaurants in Istanbul to be awarded a Michelin Star.

== History ==
The restaurant is named after Mother Agnès Marthe Nicole, a Franciscan nun who resided in the building during the early 20th century when it served as a convent.

From 2013 to 2019, Nicole was led by co-founder and Executive Chef Aylin Yazıcıoğlu, who implemented a disciplined French culinary style. During this period, Nicole gained international recognition, notably being the highest-ranked Turkish restaurant on La Liste. Following Yazıcıoğlu's departure in late 2019, the restaurant closed for a two-year hiatus during the COVID-19 pandemic. It reopened in December 2021 under the ownership of the Tomtom Suites group with Serkan Aksoy as the new Executive Chef.

== Cuisine ==
Under Chef Serkan Aksoy, a Bolu-native who previously worked at Maça Kızı and Frankie, the restaurant shifted to a "Contemporary Turkish" concept. Aksoy utilizes a "terroir" approach, sourcing seasonal ingredients from a dedicated network of local Anatolian producers.

The menu features modernized versions of traditional folk dishes. A signature course is "Kedi Batmaz," a traditional cornmeal dish from Bolu Province, reimagined as a fine-dining course with caramelized onions, "keş" cheese, and seasonal mushrooms. Another highlighted dish is a delicate lamb dolma, served with smoked yogurt and grape juice, which was specifically noted by Michelin inspectors for its balance of Middle Eastern spices.

== See also ==
- List of Michelin-starred restaurants in Turkey
- List of Turkish restaurants
