= Neolokal =

Michelin-starred restaurant in Istanbul, Turkey

- Interactive map of Neolokal

Restaurant information
- Established: 2014
- Owner: Maksut Aşkar
- Chef: Maksut Aşkar
- Food type: Turkish
- Rating: (Michelin Guide); 17,5/20 (Gault Millau)
- Location: Istanbul, Turkey
- Coordinates: 41.0238°N 28.9734°E
- Website: neolokal.com

Neolokal is a Michelin-starred restaurant located within the SALT Galata building in the Karaköy district of Istanbul, Turkey. Established in 2014 by chef Maksut Aşkar, the restaurant is known for its "New Anatolian Kitchen" philosophy, which aims to reinterpret traditional Anatolian recipes using modern techniques and sustainable practices.

== Concept and cuisine ==
The restaurant is situated in the historic former Imperial Ottoman Bank building. Neolokal's culinary approach, led by Chef Maksut Aşkar, focuses on the preservation of Anatolian food heritage. The menu is designed to bridge the gap between tradition and the future, often utilizing ingredients from the "Ark of Taste" to support biodiversity.

Signature dishes often feature a modern twist on classic flavors, such as hummus served with toasted pine nuts and cinnamon, or slow-cooked lamb with traditional grains. The restaurant also emphasizes a strong wine program, focusing exclusively on local Turkish producers.

== Awards ==
In 2022, Neolokal was awarded one Michelin Star in the inaugural Michelin Guide for Istanbul. It also became the first restaurant in Turkey to receive the Michelin Green Star for its commitment to sustainable gastronomy. Additionally, it holds a high rating of 16/20 from the Gault Millau Turkey guide.

== See also ==
- List of Michelin-starred restaurants in Turkey
- List of Turkish restaurants
