= Turkish Delight (restaurant) =

Restaurant in Seattle, Washington, U.S.

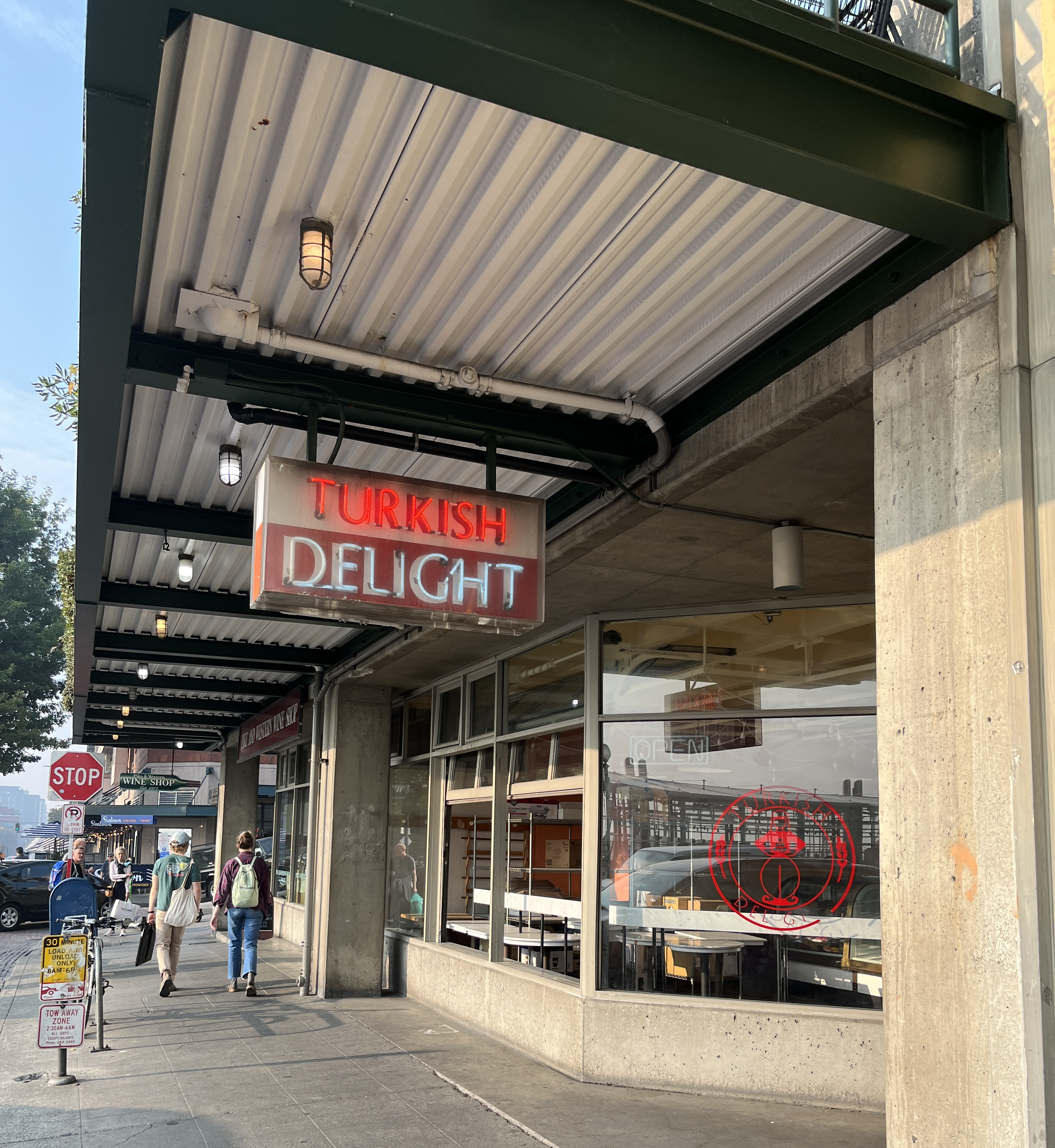
- The restaurant's exterior, 2022
- Interactive map of Turkish Delight

Restaurant information
- Owner: Semra Yavuz
- Food type: Turkish
- Location: 1930 Pike Place, Seattle, King, Washington, 98101, United States
- Coordinates: 47.6104°N 122.3431°W

Turkish Delight is a restaurant at Seattle's Pike Place Market, in the U.S. state of Washington.

== Description ==
The Turkish restaurant Turkish Delight is located on Pike Place in Pike Place Market. In 2010, Jason Sheehan of Seattle Weekly described the business as "the little family-run, 10-table operation at the far end of the market".

The menu has included baklava, doner, gyros, lentil soup, pides, shawarma, tabbouleh, and Turkish delight. The chicken börek has chicken breast, mushrooms, and parsley in filo.

== History ==
Turkish Delight was founded in 1982 by the Bozatli family in Pike Place Market. Semra Yavuz owns Turkish Delight as of 2001–2015. The business has been a vendor at the Northwest Folklife Festival. Turkish Delight operated via take-out during the COVID-19 pandemic.

== Reception ==
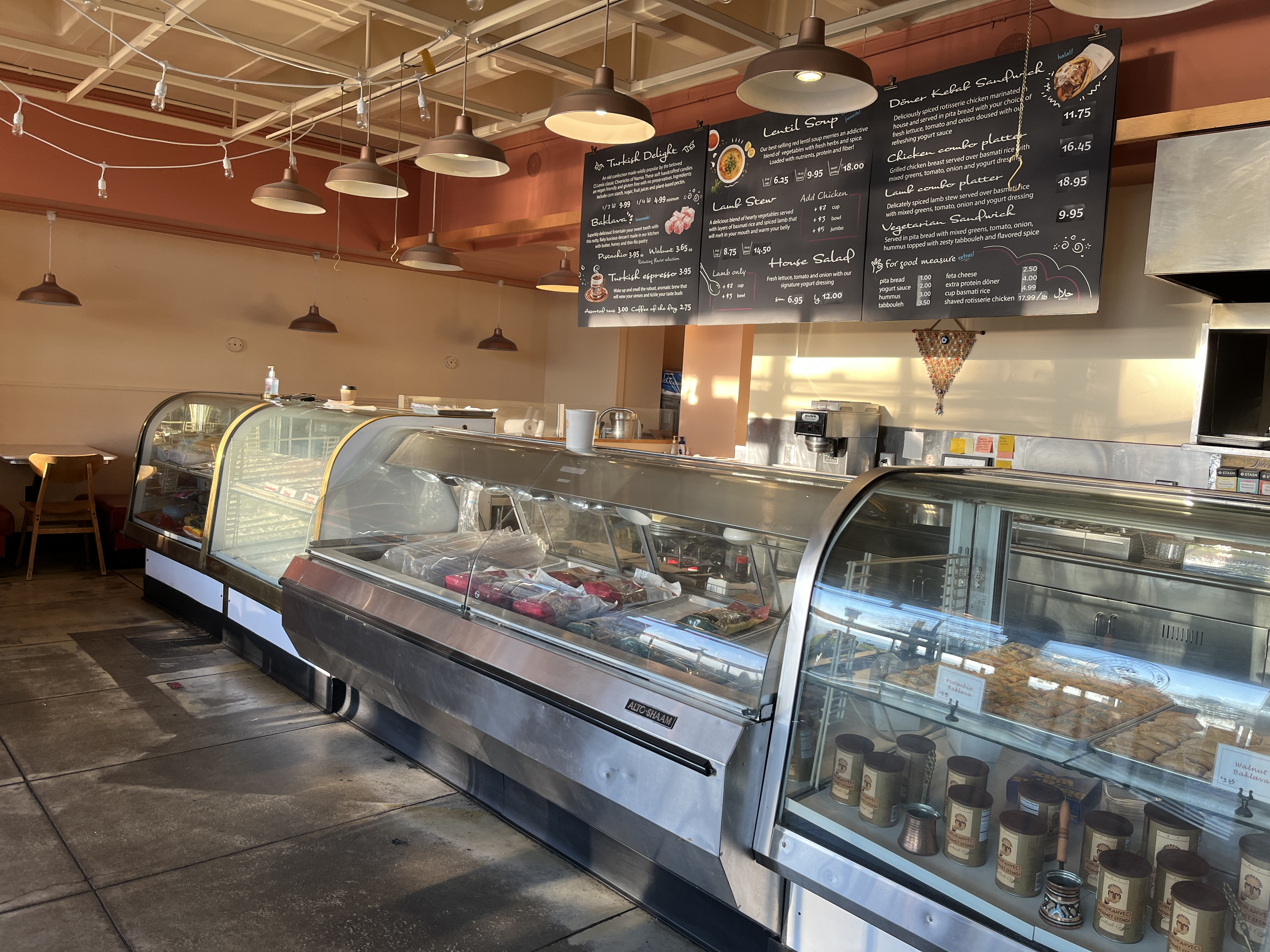
The restaurant's interior, 2022

Jason Sheehan included Turkish delight in Seattle Weekly's 2010 overview of "our favorite restaurants" and said the restaurant "not only offers doner but does a really good job with it, cutting big slabs of meat, laying on the tomato sauce, and making a proper meal of it". He also wrote, "But while any meal at Turkish Delight is guaranteed to be three things—fast, cheap, and hearty—going for the doner adds a fourth promise: It's going to be awesome."

In Seattle Metropolitan's 2011 guide to Pike Place Market, Jessica Voelker wrote, "If you grew up with The Lion, the Witch, and the Wardrobe, don't miss the chance to try Turkish delight candy at Turkish Delight." The Not for Tourists Guide to Seattle has recommended, "Brave the Market crowd for the 3-buck lentil soup."

In 2016, Naomi Tomky included the spinach börek in Thrillist's list of the 50 "best things to eat and drink" at Pike Place Market and said: "With a non-descript storefront and often empty shelves in the cases, this is the kind of local secret you rarely stumble upon in such a tourist attraction: under a thousand crispy layers of filo pastry hides a hearty serving of feta cheese and spinach." Sneha Konda included the doner kabobs in Narcity's 2019 list of 15 "bucket list foods you have to try at Seattle's Pike Place Market once in your lifetime" and wrote, "The flavorful rolls stuffed with kabobs, steaming cups of tea and pistachio baklava will leave you stuffed, happy, yet craving for more."

== See also ==
- List of restaurants in Pike Place Market
- List of Turkish restaurants
