= Teruar Urla =

Michelin-starred restaurant and boutique hotel in Urla, Turkey

- Interactive map of Teruar Urla

Restaurant information
- Established: July 2020
- Manager: Ezgi Serdaroğlu
- Chef: Osman Serdaroğlu
- Food type: French, Mediterranean
- Rating: (Michelin Guide) (Gault Millau)
- Location: Urla, İzmir, Turkey
- Coordinates: 38°15′08″N 26°44′20″E
- Website: teruarurla.com

Teruar Urla is a Michelin-starred restaurant and boutique gastro-hotel located in the Urla district of İzmir, Turkey. Established in July 2020 by Chef Osman Serdaroğlu and Ezgi Serdaroğlu, the establishment is situated in the Kuşçular neighborhood. It is known for its "terroir-focused" culinary philosophy, blending local Aegean ingredients with Mediterranean techniques. In 2023, it became one of the first restaurants in İzmir to receive both a Michelin Star and a Michelin Green Star.

== Cuisine ==
Chef Osman Serdaroğlu, trained in Michelin-starred kitchens in Italy, employs a "less is more" approach, focusing on the essence of local ingredients.

As of 2026, the restaurant operates under the culinary theme "Roots and Layers" (Kökler ve Katmanlar), which explores the depth of Aegean soil and the complexity of simple ingredients. The menu is offered in three formats: a curated Tasting Menu, a dedicated Vegetarian Tasting Menu, and an À La Carte selection. Key highlights include:

- Signature Concepts: The "Roots and Layers" theme is showcased through dishes like "Garden Roots" (composed of seasonal underground vegetables) and multi-layered presentations of local seafood.
- Vegetarian Focus: A specialized "Vegetarian Tasting Menu" emphasizes zero-waste and plant-based innovation, featuring items such as salt-baked seasonal roots and fermented Aegean herbs.
- Local Sourcing: The 2026 menus continue the partnership with LÖSEV Farm for dairy products and utilize geographically indicated produce like the Urla Sakız Artichoke.

== Sustainability ==
In 2023, Teruar Urla was awarded the Michelin Green Star for its leadership in sustainable gastronomy. The restaurant operates a zero-waste kitchen, utilizing on-site composting for soil enrichment. Approximately 90% of all ingredients are sourced from local farmers and producers within a 15-kilometer radius of the Kuşçular village. The wine selection is focused on regional vineyards to minimize the carbon footprint associated with transportation.

== See also ==
- List of French restaurants
- List of Michelin-starred restaurants in Turkey
