= Hamdi (restaurant) =

Restaurant in Seattle, Washington, U.S.

- Interactive map of Hamdi

Restaurant information
- Food type: Turkish
- Location: 4012 Leary Way NW, Seattle, King, Washington, United States
- Coordinates: 47°39′23″N 122°21′43″W
- Website: hamdiseattle.com

Hamdi is a Turkish restaurant in Seattle, in the U.S. state of Washington.

== History ==
Hamdi started as a pop-up restaurant in 2021, before operating as a brick and mortar establishment in Ballard in November 2022. Hamdi is owned by Berk Güldal and Katrina Schult. The 50-seat restaurant operates in the space that previously housed Tarsan i Jane. In 2023, four former employees filed a lawsuit over wage theft; the lawsuit was later dismissed following a settlement.

== Reception ==
Allecia Vermillion included Hamdi in Seattle Metropolitan's list of the city's best new restaurants of 2023. The business was also included in Esquire's 2023 list of the nation's 50 best new restaurants and Eater Seattle's 2024 list of the city's 38 "essential" restaurants.

== See also ==
- List of Turkish restaurants
