= Fatih Tutak =

Turkish chef

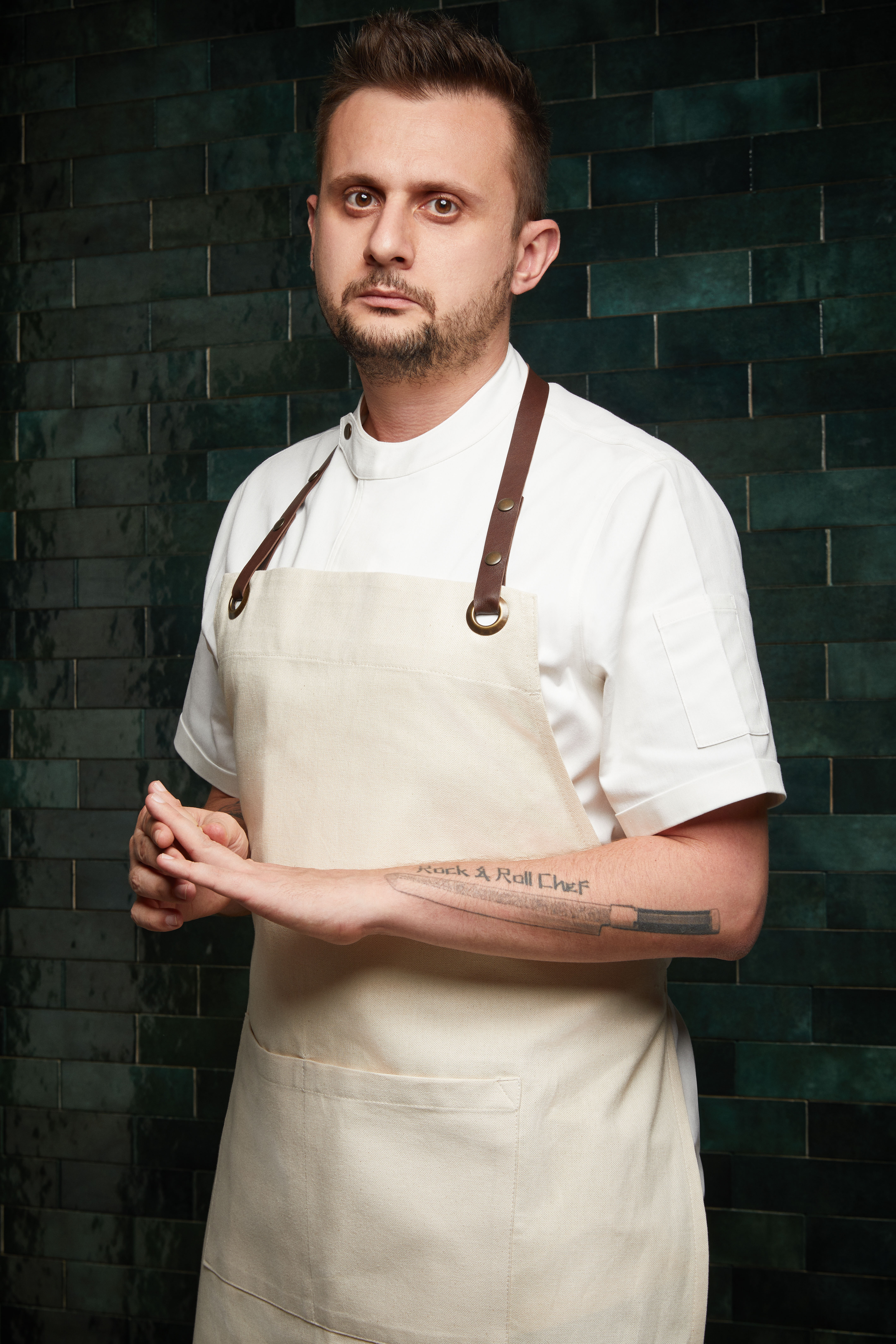
- Born: 31 August 1985 (age 40); Istanbul, Turkey
- Culinary career
- Cooking style: Turkish Food
- Current restaurant: Turk Fatih Tutak
- Award won: Michelin Plate
- Website: turkft.com

Fatih Tutak (born 31 August 1985) is a Turkish chef who is owner of two Michelin star restaurant TURK Fatih Tutak, which CNN Travel listed as one of the "world's best new restaurants for 2020".

== Biography ==
After receiving his first professional education at Bolu Mengen Culinary School and working his apprenticeship under Paul Pairet in Turkey. Tutak worked in China's great port cities such as Qingdao, Beijing and Hong Kong, he then went to Singapore to work at the kitchen of Marina Bay Sands. After that, he worked for a while at 3-Michelin-starred Nihonryori Ryugin led by chef Seiji Yamamoto in Tokyo. He then worked with chef Rene Redzepi at Noma, which was voted the best restaurant in the world by Restaurant (magazine)'s World's Best Restaurants in 2010, 2011, 2012 and 2014 in Copenhagen.

In 2015, he became Head Chef at The Dining Room of The House of Sathorn in Bangkok. In two years he became Director of Culinary Operations, and the restaurant gained international accreditation, both in Asia's 50 Best Restaurants (No.36 in 2017 & No.43 in 2018) and a Michelin plate in the Michelin Guide Thailand 2018–19.

After a while, he offered a menu based on Turkish cuisine in The Dining Room of The House of Sathorn. He created a dish he called 'From my Mom' which was his take on the Turkish dumpling.

He returned to Turkey in December 2019 and opened his first restaurant Turk Fatih Tutak in Istanbul.

== Awards ==
2017: Best 36th Restaurant / The Dining Room of The House of Sathorn - Asia's 50 Best Restaurants

2018: Best 43rd Restaurant / The Dining Room of The House of Sathorn - Asia's 50 Best Restaurants

2018: Michelin Plate / The Dining Room of The House of Sathorn - Thailand Michelin Guide

2020: "Best Chef" Winner / Fatih Tutak & - "Best Restaurant" Winner / Turk Fatih Tutak - Time Out Istanbul 19th Food & Drink Awards

2023: Michelin Guide two stars
