= Kuzu tandır =

Lamb dish from the cuisine of Turkey

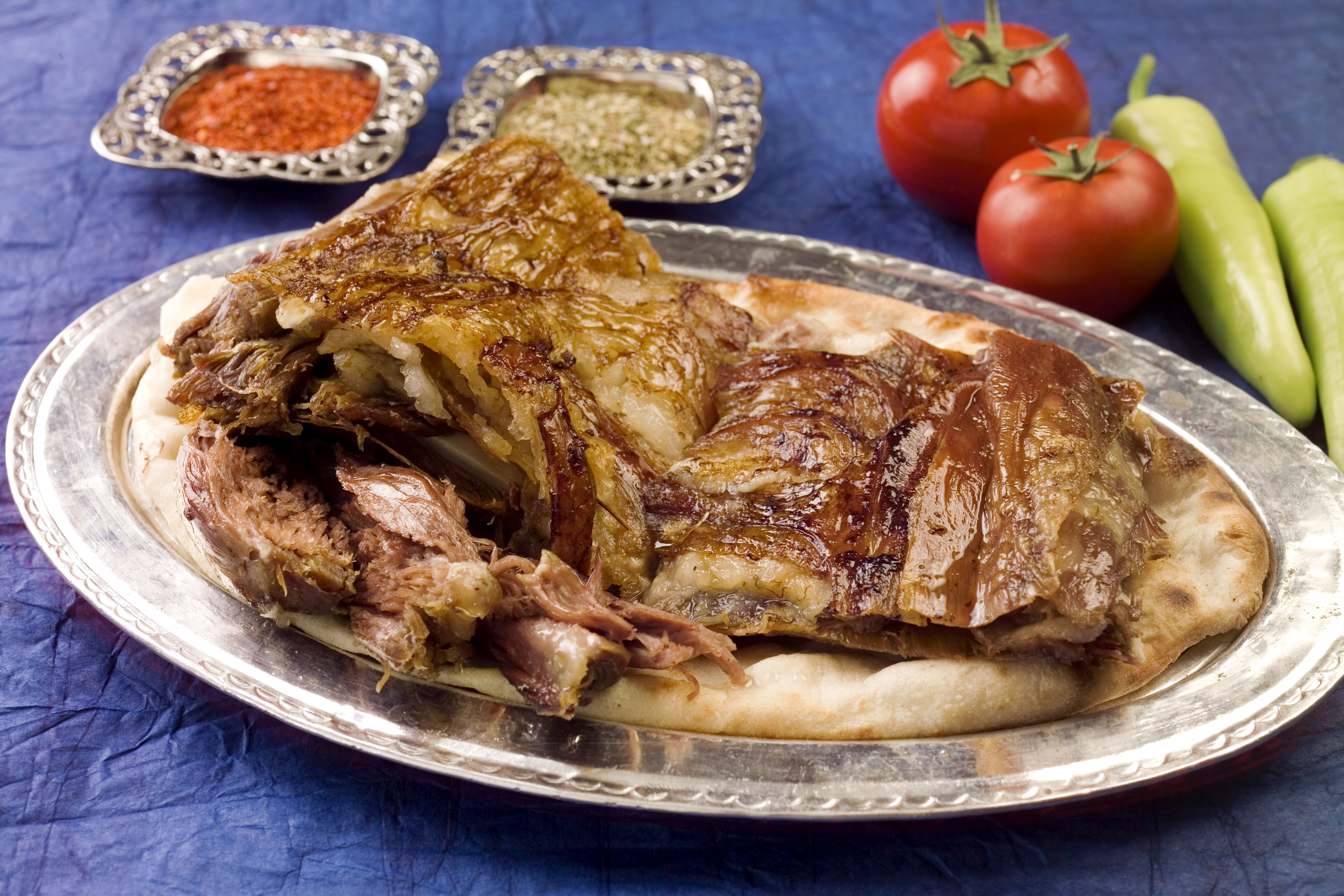
Isparta Lamb tandoori Kebab

Lamb tandoori or tandoori kebab (Turkish: Kuzu tandır or tandır kebabı), is a meat dish in Turkish cuisine. It belongs to the Akşehir region. It is prepared with lamb, onion, tomato, potato and peppers. Lamb pieces (sometimes a whole lamb) baked in an oven called a tandır, which requires a special way of cooking for hours. Served with bread and raw onions.

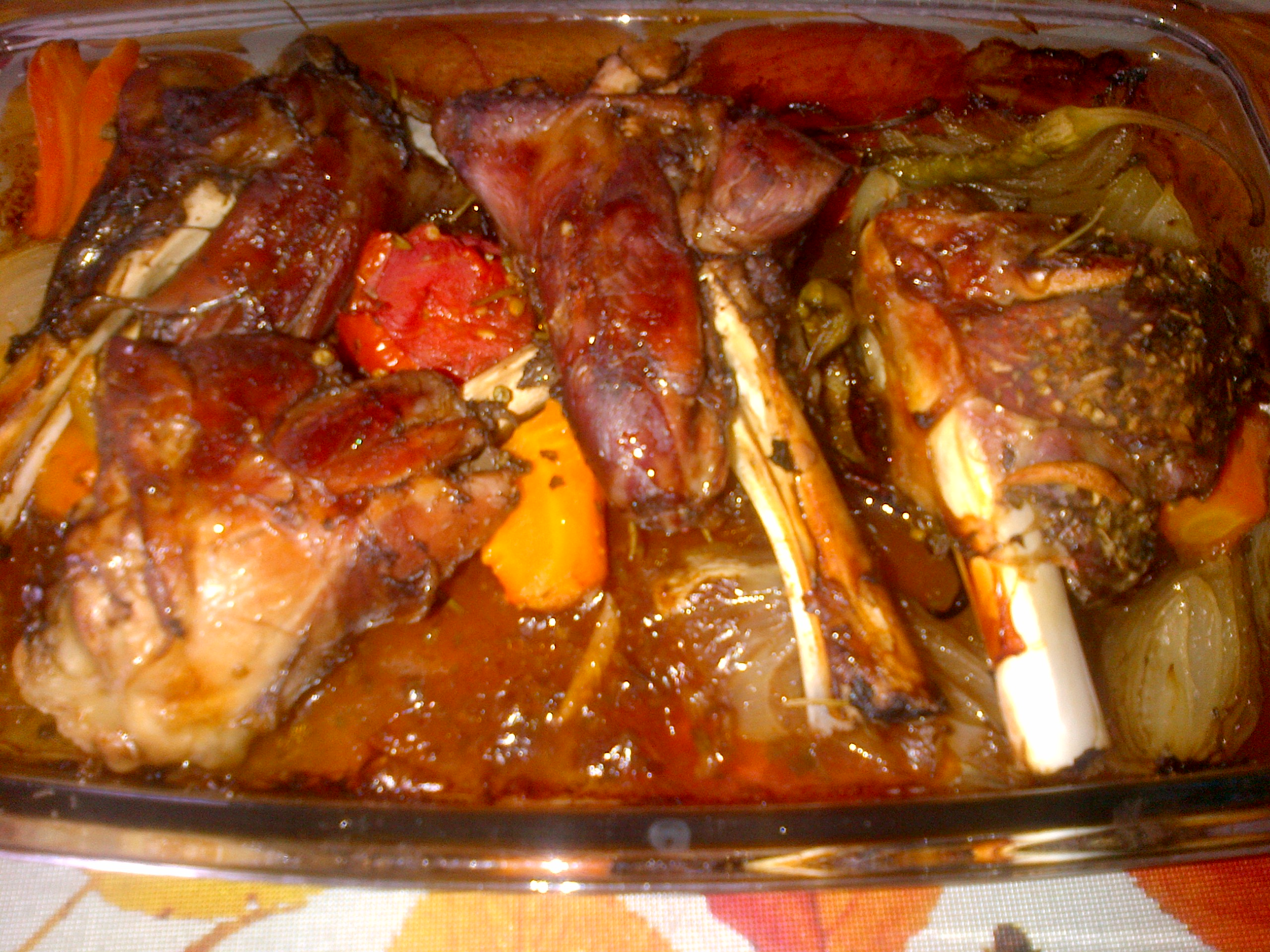
Oven baked version of Kuzu Tandir
