= Mado (food company) =

Turkish ice cream brand

MADO
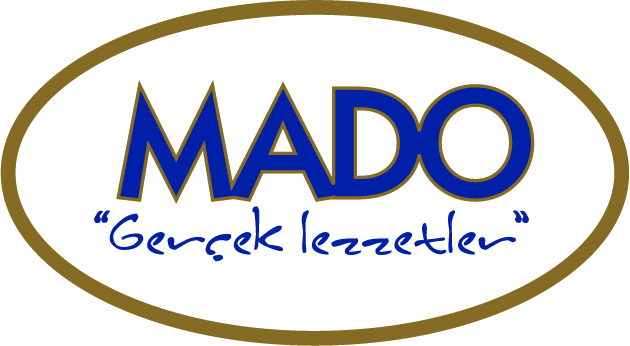
- Type: Corporation
- Genre: Ice cream, desserts, meal
- Founded: 1850; 176 years ago (original) (Kahramanmaraş, Turkey); 1991; 35 years ago (franchise) (Istanbul, Turkey)
- Founder: Yaşar Kanbur
- Headquarters: Kahramanmaraş, Turkey
- Key people: Mehmet Kanbur (chairman)
- Products: Ice-cream, cake, börek, breakfast
- Website: www.mado.com.tr

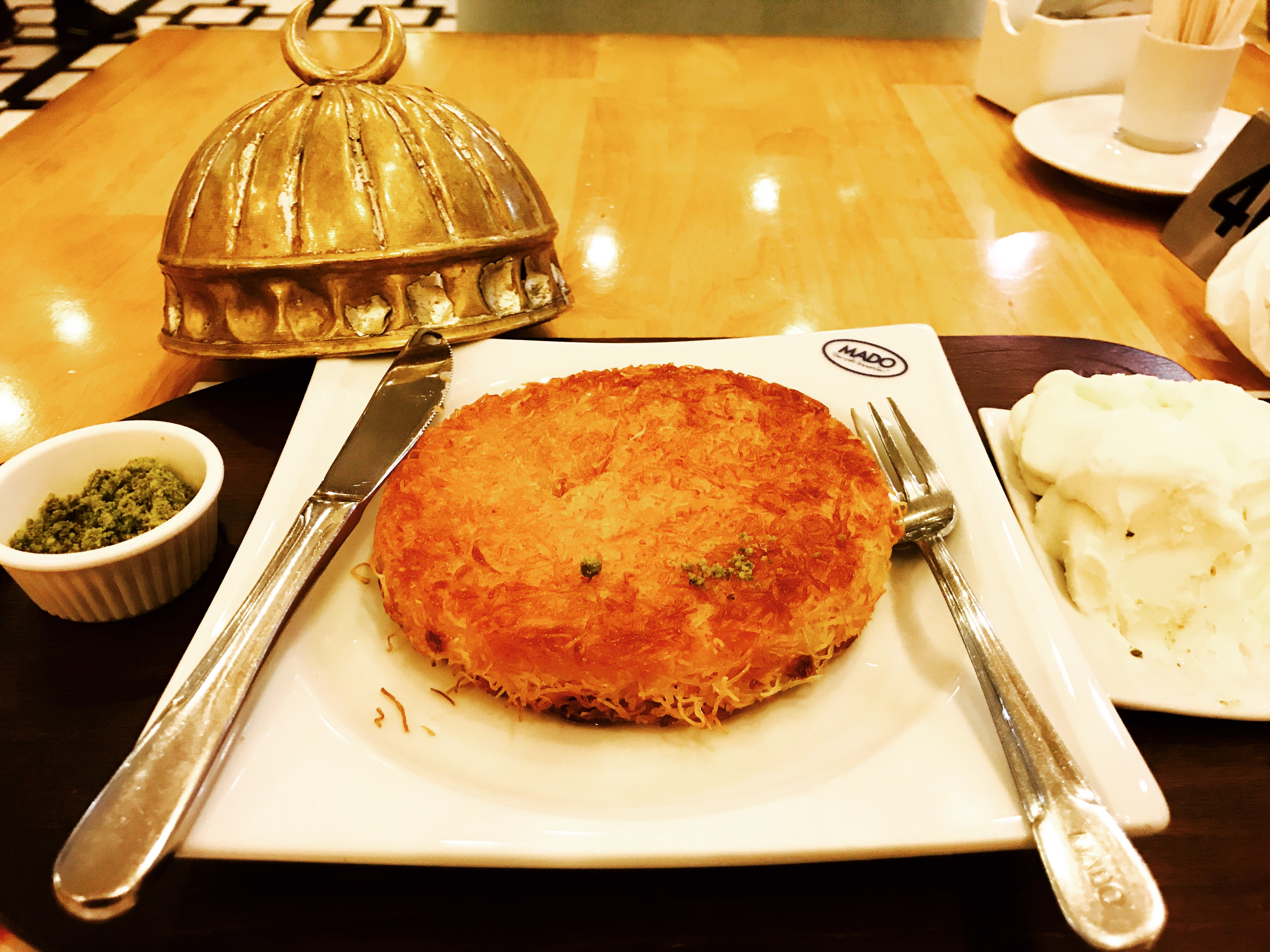
Turkish kanafeh at a MADO

MADO is a Turkish ice cream and pastry brand that has about 300 outlets in Turkey and 22 other countries around the world. The brand gets its name from two words: "Maraş", the former name of the city where the firm is originated; and "Dondurma", the Turkish sort of ice-cream.

== History ==
MADO was founded in 1850 by Yaşar Kanbur. The ice cream shop became a chain after 1991. It has more than 305 restaurants and cafés in Turkey, and also has branches in Australia, Canada, Netherlands, United Arab Emirates, Uzbekistan Lebanon, South Korea, Bosnia and Herzegovina, Cyprus, China, Taiwan, Qatar, Kuwait, Saudi Arabia, Bahrain, Malaysia, Azerbaijan, Kazakhstan, Turkmenistan Egypt, Libya, Iraq, Greece, Georgia, Germany, Jordan ,Oman and South Africa.

In 2019, MADO opened its first shop in Taiwan in a joint venture with the Taiwanese conglomerate Teco Group.
