= Hünkar (restaurant) =

Hünkar Lokantası
- Location of Hünkar Lokantası in Istanbul

Restaurant information
- Established: 1950; 76 years ago
- Owner: Talip Ügümü
- Head chef: Feridun Ügümü
- Food type: Ottoman cuisine
- Location: Mim Kemal Öke Caddesi 21, Nişantaşı, Istanbul, Turkey
- Coordinates: 41.04694°N 28.99306°E
- Website: web.archive.org/web/20081225045337/http://www.hunkar1950.com/

Hünkar (Turkish: Hünkar Lokantası) is a restaurant in Istanbul, Turkey, founded in 1950 in Fatih and moved in 2000 to Nişantaşı, an upscale living and shopping neighborhood. At the same time, a branch was also opened in Etiler, another upscale quarter.

== Background ==
The restaurants are owned and run by restaurateurs Talip Ügümü and his three sons, Feridun, Galip and Faruk, while his grandsons are also in the business, all being the third and fourth generation of a chef family. Their grandfather served as chef of the prominent army general and politician Kâzım Karabekir (1882–1948). The founder of the restaurant, father Talip began his career at age eight in Erzurum as dishwasher in "Seher" Restaurant. After three years, he became kitchen-hand. Already at age fifteen, Talip was a cook. He was inspired to the variety of Ottoman cuisine found in Istanbul as told by travelling traders. In 1950, he decided to go to Istanbul, where he started again as kitchen-hand in famous restaurants at Sirkeci, then a popular restaurant district of the city.

After getting sufficient knowledge in Ottoman-Turkish culinary, Talip Ügümü opened his own premises with only 4-5 tables close to Column of Marcian in Fatih district at age seventeen in 1950. Named after the Ottoman Turkish word Hünkar for sovereign or sultan, the restaurant specialized in typical traditional Ottoman-Turkish cuisine.

Following two successful years, he closed the business, and went to mandatory tmilitary service. Thenafter, his curiosity for the Black Sea Region cuisine took him to Samsun and Trabzon. In 1965, he returned to Istanbul, and reopened his "Hünkar" Restaurant again in Fatih.

In 1998, another "Hünkar" Restaurant was established in Etiler, which is operated by his son Faruk. The restaurant in Fatih was moved in 2000 to Nişantaşı, which is run by his other two sons Feridun and Galip.

== Food ==
The restaurant's specialty, "Hünkar beğendi" (literally: admired by the sultan), a traditional dish prepared of crunchy lamb on a bed of mashed eggplants, associates the establishment's name as well. Another Ottoman speciality is "Ayvalı yahni", (literally: stew with quince), which is prepared daily in the winter months.

The kitchen in Nişantaşı offers around 30 to 35 different dishes cooked daily using seasonal vegetables and fish. Warm dishes are displayed at the counter in front of the kitchen, where customers can choose their dishes on arrival. Specialties include dishes from Istanbul and Anatolia, Cyprus, Greece, Circassia and Armenia.

It is considered one of the best gourmet cuisine restaurants of Turkey. In 2007, Hünkar was chosen 99th of the world's top 100 restaurants by the British Magazine Restaurant.

== See also ==
- List of Turkish restaurants
