= Hafiz Mustafa 1864 =

Turkish purveyor of sweets and delicacies

Hafiz Mustafa
- Company type: Private
- Industry: Confectionery
- Founded: 1864; 162 years ago Istanbul, Ottoman Empire
- Founder: Hadji İsmail Hakkı Bey
- Headquarters: Istanbul, Turkey
- Products: Confectioneries, puddings, teas
- Owner: Ongurlar family
- Website: online.hafizmustafa.com

Hafiz Mustafa 1864 is a Turkish purveyor of sweets and delicacies which originated and is still headquartered in Istanbul.

It was founded in 1864 by Hadji İsmail Hakkı Bey during the reign of Sultan Abdulaziz at shop number 86 on the viaduct which today is known as Hamidiye street in the Fatih district of Istanbul. Hakki Bey began by producing Rock candy. The Hafiz Mustafa operation won 12 gold medals in confectionery in Europe between 1926 and 1938.

In the present it is run by the Ongurlar family who have owned it since 2007. Among their offerings are Turkish delights, baklavas, puddings, teas, and assorted sweets.

Currently the purveyor has over a dozen branches in Turkey, one at the Dubai Mall and one at the Mall of the Emirates in Dubai, and one in London, United Kingdom.
