= Casa Lavanda =

Michelin-starred restaurant and boutique hotel in Şile, Turkey

- Interactive map of Casa Lavanda

Restaurant information
- Head chef: Emre Şen
- Chef: Emre Şen
- Food type: Mediterranean, Farm-to-table
- Rating: (2025–2026) Gault & Millau: 3 Toques (15.5/20)
- Location: Şile, Istanbul, Turkey
- Website: www.casalavanda.com.tr

Casa Lavanda is a Michelin-starred restaurant and boutique hotel located in the Ulupelit village of Şile, Istanbul, Turkey. Established in 2009 by the Şen family, it is recognized for its "farm-to-table" philosophy and Mediterranean-inspired cuisine led by Chef Emre Şen. In 2024, it became one of the first restaurants in Turkey to hold both a Michelin Star and a Michelin Green Star.

== History ==
The foundations of Casa Lavanda were laid in 1992 when the Şen family built a private country house in Ulupelit. Initially a family retreat, the property was transformed into a boutique hotel and restaurant in 2009 by Feryal and Ahmet Şen. The establishment is currently managed by their sons, Ekin Şen and Chef Emre Şen. The transition to professional gastronomy was rooted in the family's Northern Aegean heritage and their tradition of large communal meals.

== Cuisine ==
Chef Emre Şen describes his culinary style as Mediterranean, influenced by classical Italian techniques and a "less is more" philosophy. The menu is built around seasonal availability, with signature dishes including chestnut soup made with Zonguldak chestnuts, handmade egg-yolk tagliatelle, and wild porcini mushrooms sourced from the surrounding forests. The establishment also features a comprehensive wine cellar housing selections from over 20 local Turkish producers and 100 international labels.

== Sustainability ==
Casa Lavanda is a pioneer of sustainable gastronomy in Turkey, managing 2,000 square meters of biodynamic farmland that meets 80% of its vegetable needs. The establishment operates a zero-organic-waste policy, converting all kitchen and garden waste into on-site compost. In 2025, it was awarded a 3-star rating by the Sustainable Restaurant Association (SRA) through the "Food Made Good" standard, achieving a high score of 84%.
