= Rock candy =

Confection composed of relatively large sugar crystals

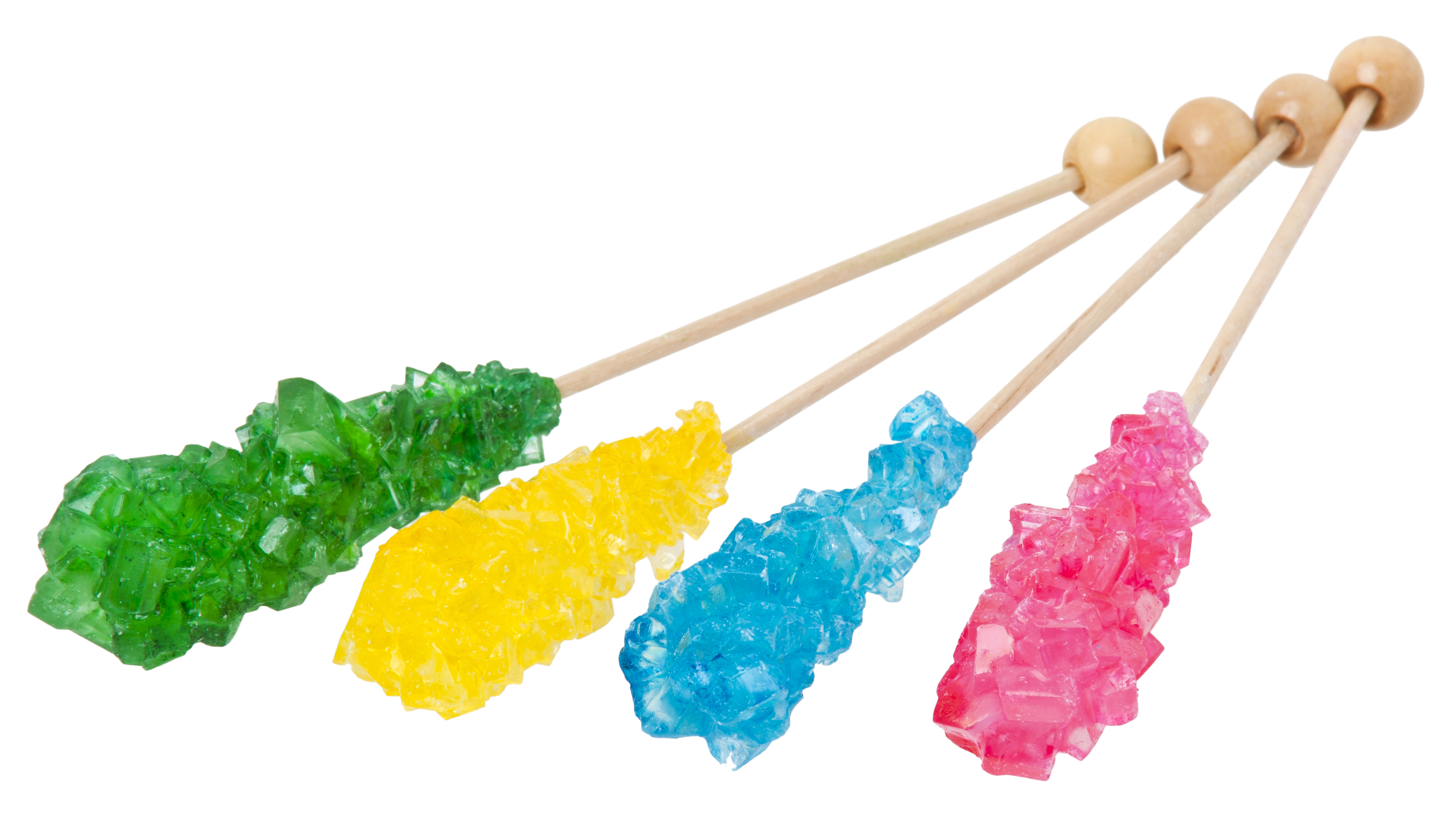
- Colored and flavored rock candy commonly sold in the United States
- Alternative names: Rock sugar
- Type: Confectionery
- Place of origin: India and Iran
- Main ingredients: Sugar, water
- Variations: About 10
- Food energy (per serving): 223–400 kcal (930–1,670 kJ)

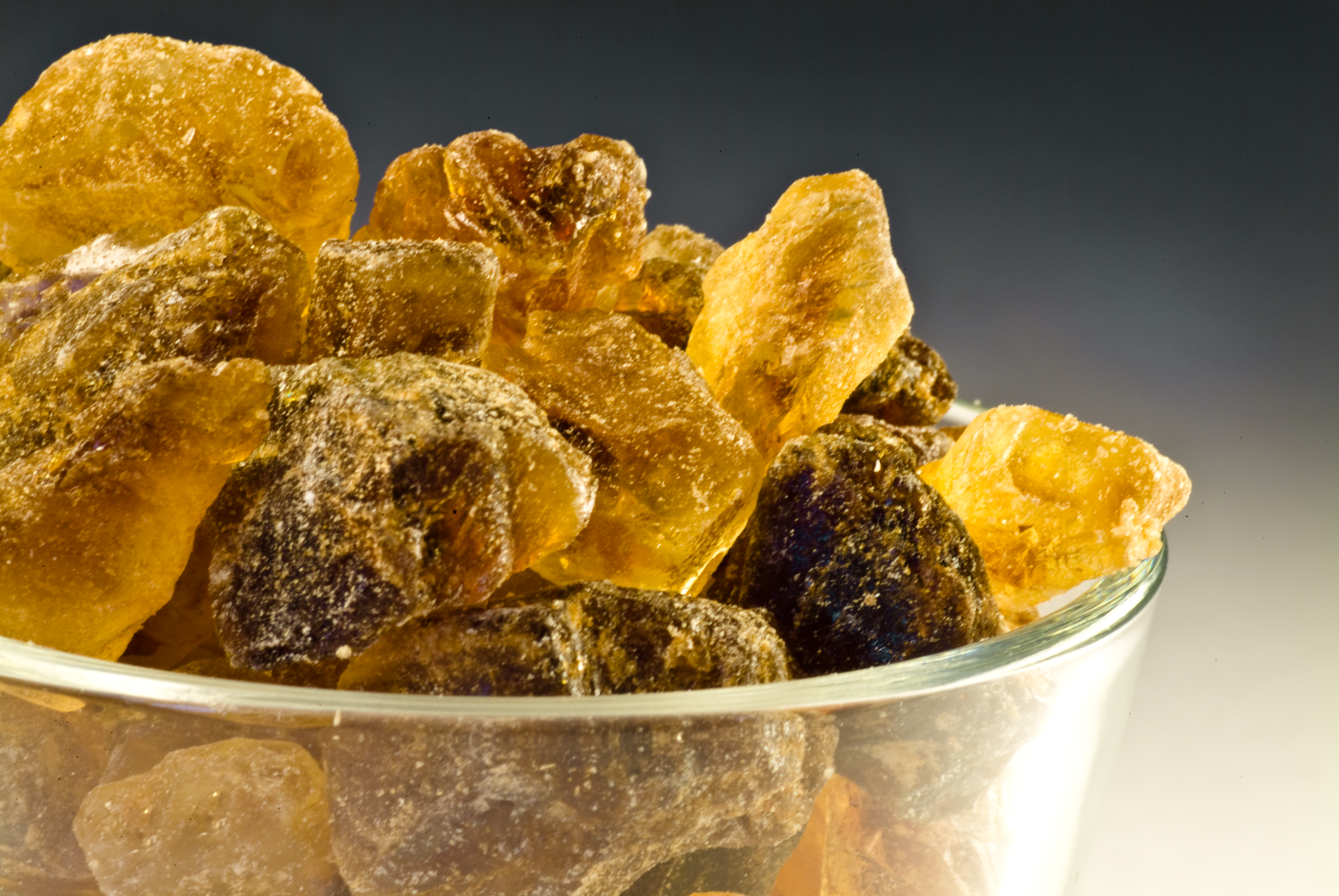
Traditional brown rock sugar

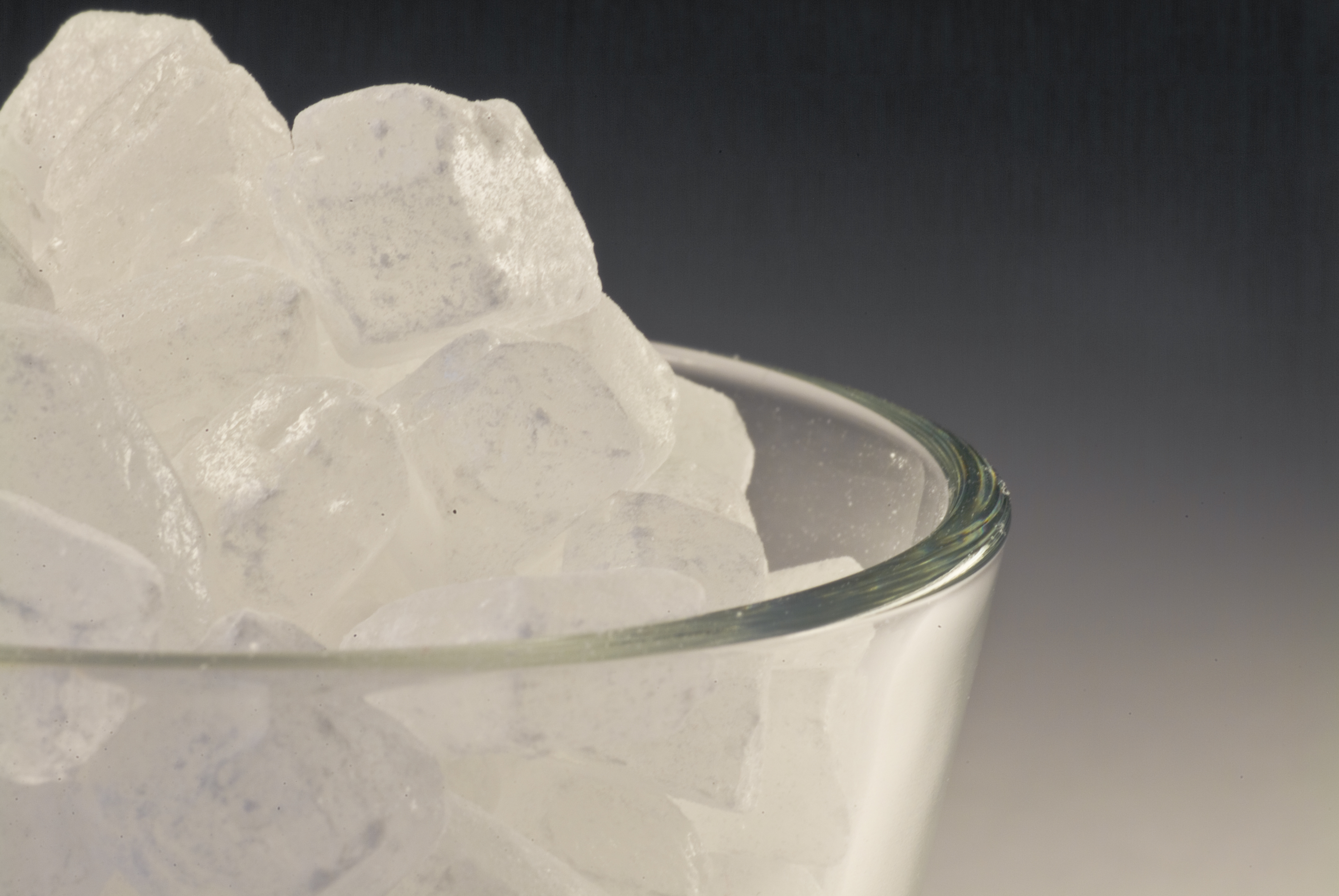
White rock sugar

Rock candy or sugar candy, also called rock sugar or crystal sugar, is a type of confection composed of relatively large sugar crystals. In some parts of the world, local variations are called nabat, navat, or novvot.

This candy is formed by allowing a supersaturated solution of sugar and water to crystallize onto a surface suitable for crystal nucleation, such as a string, stick, or plain granulated sugar. Heating the water before adding the sugar allows more sugar to dissolve thus producing larger crystals. Crystals form after six to seven days. Food coloring may be added to the mixture to produce colored candy.

== Nomenclature ==
Etymologically, "sugar candy" derives from late 13th-century English (in reference to "crystallised sugar"), from Old French çucre candi (meaning 'sugar candy'), and ultimately from Arabic qandi, from Persian qand ('cane sugar'), probably from Sanskrit khanda ('piece of sugar'). The sense gradually broadened (especially in the United States) to mean by the late 19th century "any confection having sugar as its basis". In the United Kingdom, these are sweets, and "candy" tends to be restricted to sweets made only from boiled sugar and striped in bright colors.

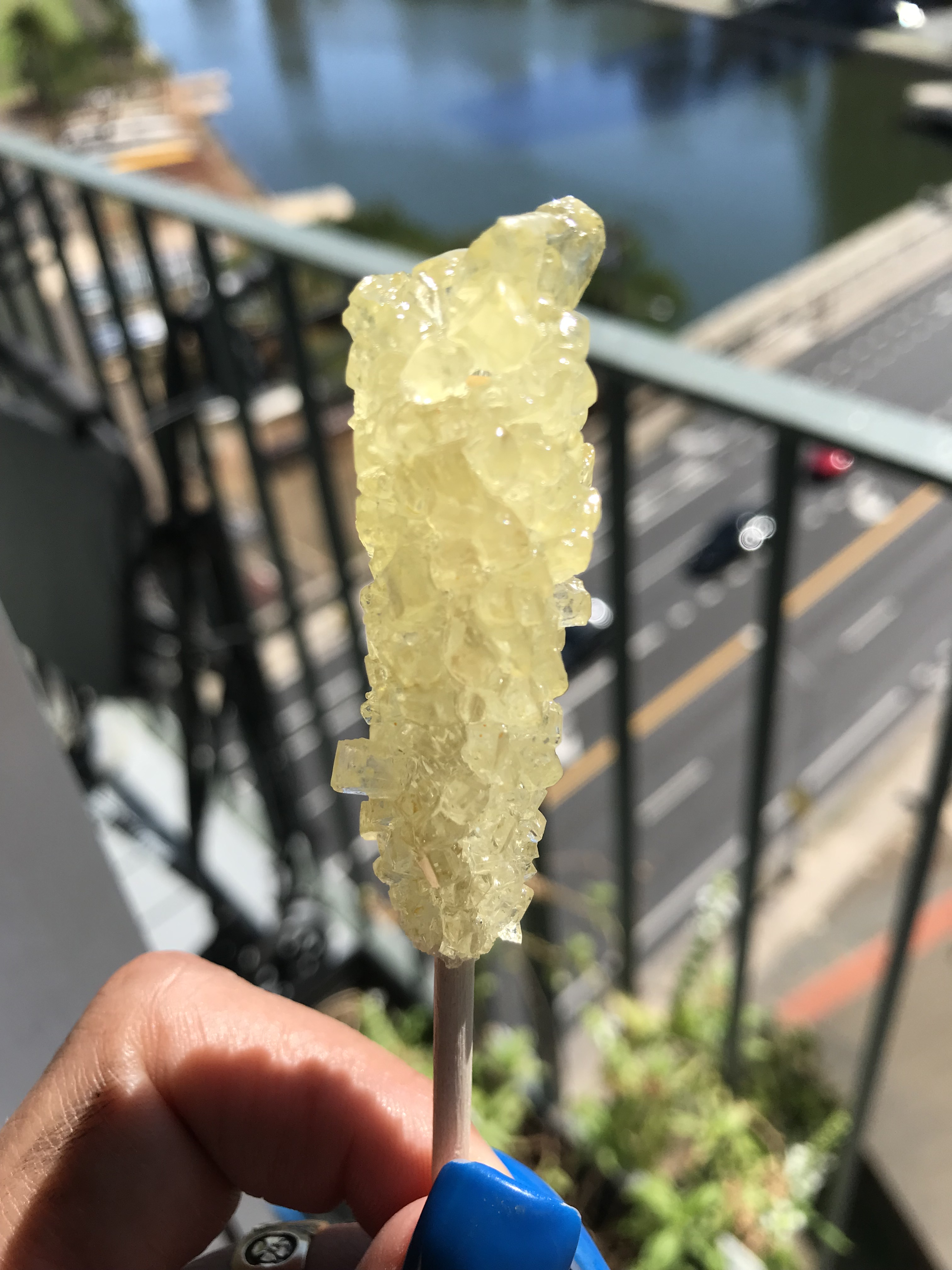
Rock candy in the US

The modern American term "rock candy" (referring to brittle large natural sugar crystals) should not be confused with the British term rock (referring to an amorphous and opaque boiled sugar product, initially hard but then chewy at mouth temperature).

== Origins ==
Islamic writers in the first half of the 9th century described the production of candy sugar, where crystals were grown through cooling supersaturated sugar solutions. One of the famed makers of rock candy in the Muslim east is Hafiz Mustafa 1864 in Istanbul, founded during the reign of Sultan Abdulaziz.

According to the production process, rock sugar is divided into two types: monocrystalline rock sugar and polycrystalline rock sugar.

== Cuisine ==
Rock candy is often dissolved in tea. It is an important part of the tea culture of East Frisia, where a lump of rock sugar (locally called "Kandis") is placed at the bottom of the cup. Rock candy consumed with tea is also the most common and popular way of drinking tea in Iran, where it is called nabat; the most popular nabat flavor is saffron. Rock candy is also prepared in Central Asia under the name of novvot.

It is a common ingredient in Chinese cooking. In China, it is used to sweeten chrysanthemum tea, as well as Cantonese dessert soups and the liquor baijiu. Many households have rock candy available to marinate meats, add to stir fry, and to prepare food such as yao shan. In less modern times, rock sugar was a luxury only for the wealthy. Rock candy is also regarded as having medicinal properties, and in some Chinese provinces, it is used as a part of traditional Chinese medicine.

In Mexico, it is used during the Day of the Dead to make sugar skulls, often highly decorated. Sugar skulls are given to children so they will not fear death; they are also offered to the dead. In the Friesland province of the Netherlands, bits of rock candy are baked in the luxury white bread sûkerbôle. Rock candy is a common ingredient in Tamil cuisine, particularly in the Sri Lankan city of Jaffna. In the US, rock candy comes in many colors and flavors, and is slightly hard to find, due to it being considered old-fashioned.

== Mishri ==
Misri
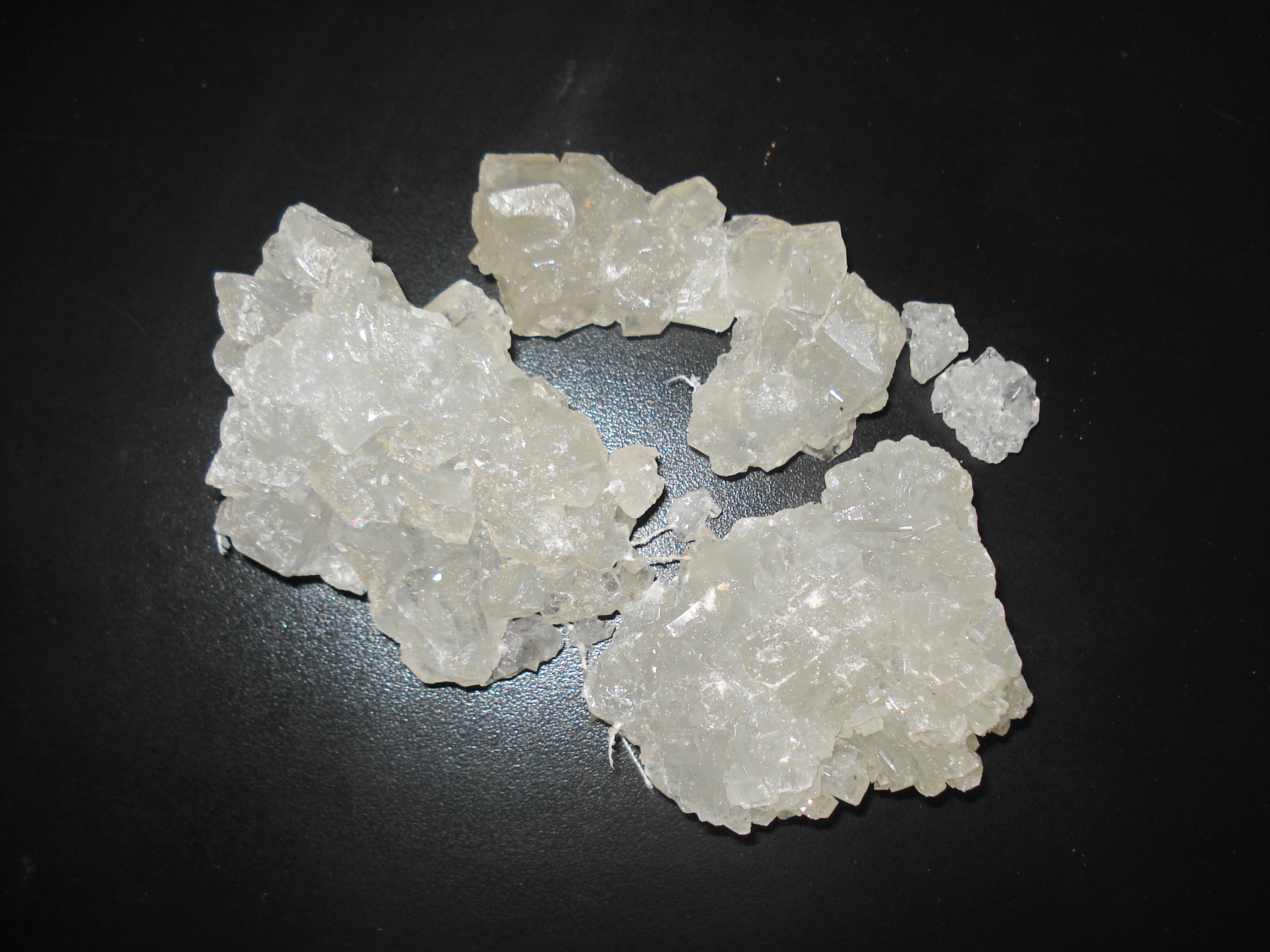
- Misri crystals
- Type: Rock candy or sweetener
- Place of origin: India and Iran

Mishri (or misri) refers to crystallized sugar lumps, and a type of confectionery mineral, which has its origins in India and Iran, also known as rock sugar elsewhere. It is used in India as a type of candy, or used to sweeten milk or tea.

Two Indian dessert dishes made from mishri and khoya (thickened milk) are mishri-mawa (kalakand) and mishri-peda, which are more commonly eaten in northern and western regions of India, including Uttar Pradesh, Delhi, Rajasthan, Punjab, and Gujarat; as well as Odisha and northern coastal Andhra Pradesh.

The Ghantewala Halwai, a sweet shop in Delhi, which began by selling mishri mawa in 1790, is famous for mishri mawa and sells 40 varieties of sweets made from mishri.

== Beverages ==
Rock and rye is a term used both for alcoholic liqueurs and cocktails using rye whiskey and rock candy, as well as for non-alcoholic beverages made in imitation thereof, such as the "Rock & Rye" flavor of soda pop made by Faygo.

== See also ==
- Hard candy
- Konpeitō
- Jaggery, an early form of sugar
