= St Christopher's Place =

Small pedestrianised shopping street in Marylebone, London, England

Coordinates: 51.515638°N 0.150376°W

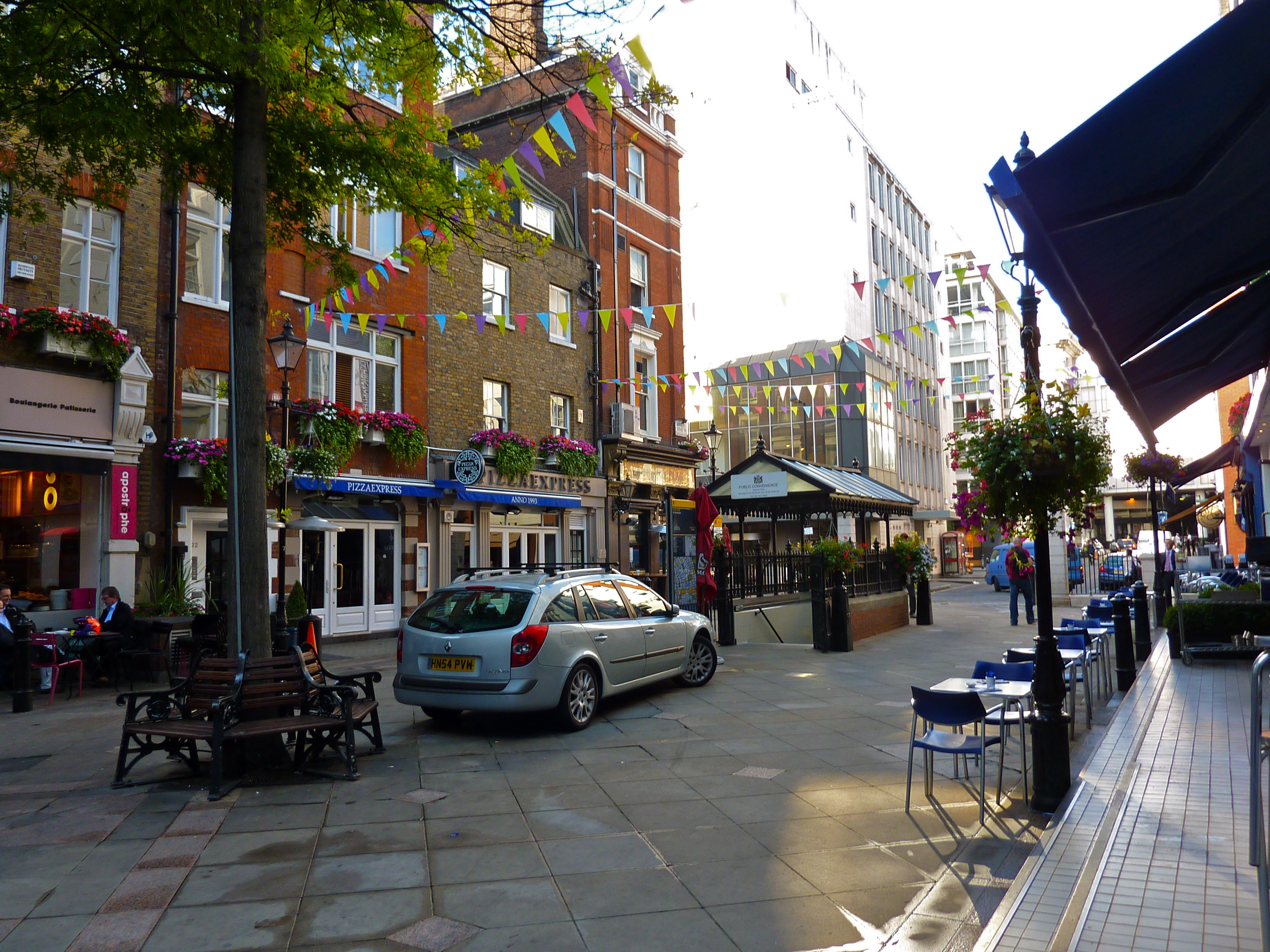
- Length: 0.2 km (0.12 mi)
- Location: London, United Kingdom
- Postal code: W1
- Nearest Tube station: Bond Street
- North end: Wigmore Street
- South end: Oxford Street

Other
- Known for: Shopping

St Christopher's Place is a short pedestrianised shopping street in Marylebone, central London between Oxford Street and Wigmore Street. Its retail units are smaller and higher-end than the major chains located on Oxford Street, similar to nearby South Molton Street.

The entire street lies within the Stratford Place conservation area.
