= Mikla =

Restaurant in Istanbul

- Interactive map of Mikla

Restaurant information
- Established: October 2005
- Owners: IYIG – Istanbul Food and Beverage Group
- Chef: Mehmet Gürs
- Food type: New Anatolian Kitchen
- Rating: (Michelin Guide} 15,5/20 (Gault Millau)
- Location: Meşrutiyet Cad. 15, Tepebaşı, Beyoğlu, Istanbul, Turkey
- Coordinates: 41.03105°N 28.97410°E
- Seating capacity: 100 (indoor) + 140 (outdoor)
- Website: miklarestaurant.com

Mikla is a contemporary restaurant in Istanbul, known for its "New Anatolian Kitchens". Opened in October 2005, Mikla is on the top two floors of The Marmara Pera Hotel located in the historical Pera region, with its view of Istanbul. The restaurant was awarded the Michelin star in October 2022.

== Restaurant ==
Mikla is located on the roof top floor of "The Marmara Pera" hotel. It opened in October 2005. The initial idea was to create a refined but contemporary "Istanbullu" restaurant. Both the menu and the general feel of the restaurant reflect the Turkish-Scandinavian background of Mehmet Gürs, the Chef-Owner who was among the pioneer of the contemporary restaurant scene in Istanbul when he moved to Istanbul in 1996.

The name of the restaurant is derived from "Miklagard", the Old Norse name for Istanbul, meaning "the Great Town".

Mikla launched its "New Anatolian Kitchen" in 2012.

=== Chef-Owner ===
The restaurant's owner and chef Mehmet Gürs was born in Finland to a Turkish father and a Finnish-Swedish mother. Grown up in Sweden, completed his hospitality education and proper training in USA and settled in Istanbul in 1996 to open up his first restaurant. Currently he is the chef-owner of the Food and Beverage Group in Bangladesh.
