= Vino Locale =

Two-Michelin-starred restaurant in Urla, Turkey

- Interactive map of Vino Locale

Restaurant information
- Established: 2018
- Owners: Ozan and Seray Kumbasar
- Food type: Modern Aegean / Italian-inspired fusion
- Rating: (Michelin Guide); 15,5/20 (Gault Millau)
- Location: İzmir, Turkey
- Coordinates: 38°16′51.2″N 26°44′48.1″E
- Website: urlavinolocale.com

Vino Locale is a restaurant in Urla, Turkey, established in 2018 by chef Ozan Kumbasar and sommelier Seray Kumbasar. It is recognized as the first chef-led restaurant in the Urla region.

In the 2026 Michelin Guide, it was elevated to two Michelin stars and a Michelin Green Star, becoming the first restaurant in İzmir to achieve this rating. The restaurant is also recognized by the Gault & Millau Turkey guide, where it holds "3 Toques" status.

== Concept and cuisine ==
The restaurant's culinary philosophy, led by Chef Ozan Kumbasar, is a "farm-to-table" fusion that incorporates international techniques—drawn from his professional experience in Italy and several Asian countries, including Thailand.

The menu changes monthly to reflect the extreme seasonality of the Aegean Region, featuring local specialties such as artichokes or regional okra varieties. While the foundation of the dishes is often Italian-inspired, they frequently feature modern twists and spices influenced by the chef's international background. The restaurant is housed in a restored stone building with a traditional courtyard. Seray Kumbasar, serving as the sommelier, curates a wine list that focuses exclusively on local producers from the Urla Wine Route.

== Awards ==
In 2023, Vino Locale became the first restaurant in İzmir to be awarded a Michelin Star and a Michelin Green Star. In the 2026 Michelin Guide, the restaurant was elevated to two Michelin stars, making it the first in İzmir and the second in Turkey to achieve this distinction.

In addition to its Michelin ratings, the restaurant was highly recognized by the Gault & Millau Turkey 2024 guide, receiving "3 Toques" (15.5/20) and the "Best Sommelier" award for Seray Kumbasar.

== See also ==
- List of Michelin-starred restaurants in Turkey
