= Sofra =

In the Ottoman and Turkish worlds, a yer sofrası is traditionally a low table or tray used as a dining table. In modern Turkish language sofra means a table prepared or set for eating a meal.

== Bibliography ==
- Marianna Yerasimos, 500 Years of Ottoman Cuisine, 2003, ISBN 978-975-23-0161-0
- Metin Saip Sürücüoğlu, "Kitchen Organization, Ceremonial and Celebratory Meals in the Ottoman Empire"
- Ronald T. Marchese, The fabric of life: cultural transformations in Turkish society
- Suraiya Faroqhi, Subjects of the Sultan: culture and daily life in the Ottoman Empire
- Mehrdad Kia, Daily Life in the Ottoman Empire
