= Claude Le Tohic =

French chef and restaurateur

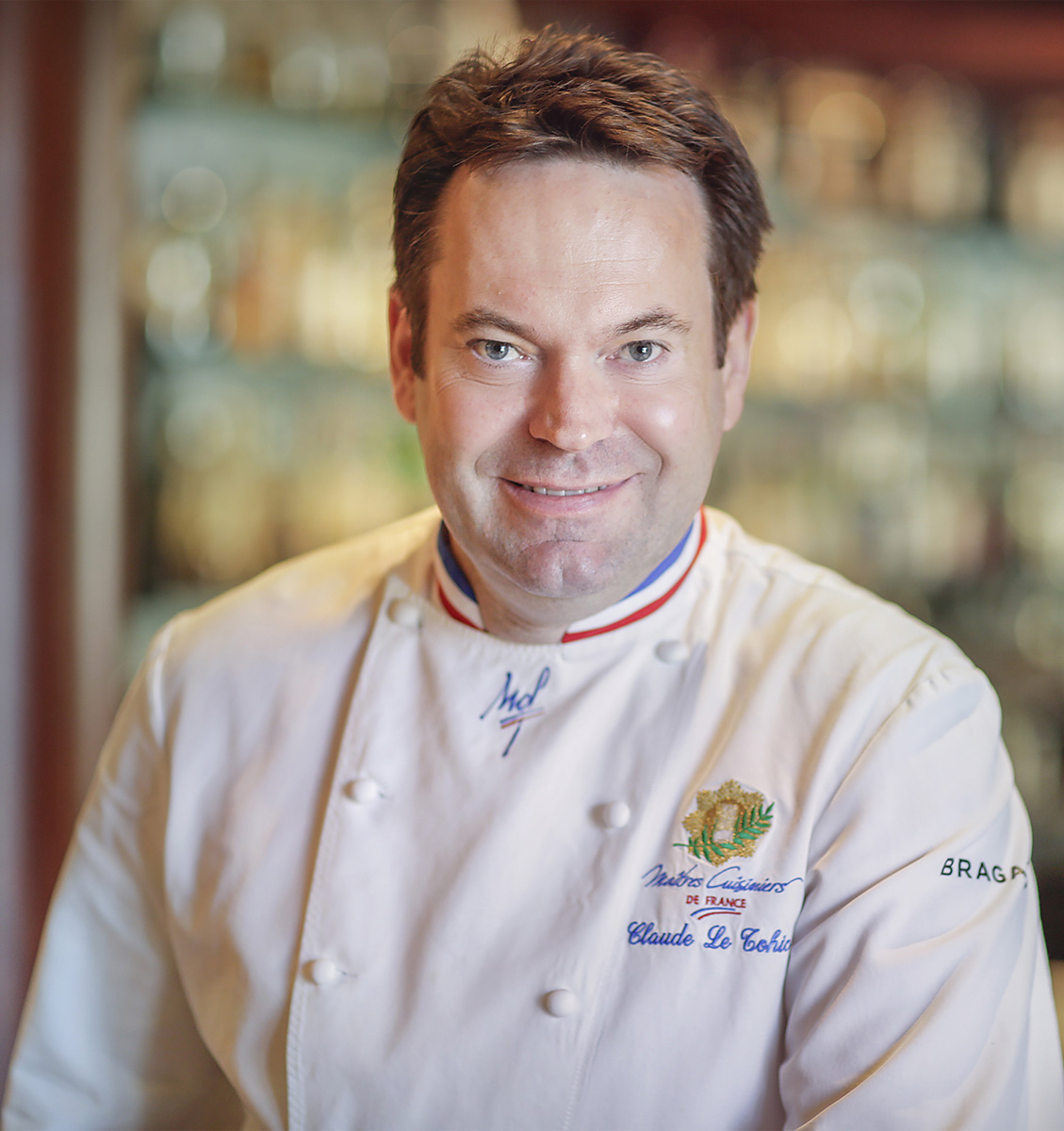
- Claude Le Tohic in 2019
- Born: Brittany, France
- Culinary career
- Cooking style: French
- Current restaurant(s): ONE65
- Award(s) won: Meilleur Ouvrier de France, James Beard Foundation Award, World Champion at the International Catering Cup (ICC)

Claude Le Tohic is a French chef and restaurateur who earned a three Michelin star rating in Las Vegas for his work at Joël Robuchon, in the MGM Grand Hotel. In 2023, Le Tohic led Team USA to win the award of World Champion at the International Catering Cup (ICC) competition. In 2021, Le Tohic received a Michelin Star for his work at O' by Claude Le Tohic, in Union Square, San Francisco. In 2010, he was named Best Chef: Southwest by the James Beard Foundation. In 2004, Le Tohic received the peer-juried Meilleur Ouvrier de France honor. He is the Chef/Partner behind ONE65, a six-story multi-concept culinary destination in San Francisco's Union Square, which includes ONE65 Patisserie & Boutique, Alexander's Steakhouse, Elements at ONE65 (a bar and lounge) and O’ by Claude Le Tohic.

== Early life and education ==
Claude Le Tohic was born and raised in Brittany, France. He learned to cook and run a restaurant while very young, by working at his family's crêperie. After graduating from high-school, Le Tohic pursued cooking by attending culinary school in Vannes, France. Upon graduation, he accepted an apprenticeship at Les Hortensias, a one Michelin star restaurant in Paris.

== Culinary Background ==
Le Tohic began his career at the kitchen of Ghislaine Arabian’s Le Restaurant, a two Michelin star rated restaurant in Lille, France. In 1987, he was offered the position of Chef de Cuisine under Chef Joël Robuchon at Jamin, Chef Robuchon’s first three Michelin star rated restaurant in Paris.

In 2005, Le Tohic was asked by Joël Robuchon to open Joël Robuchon restaurant and L’Atelier de Joël Robuchon, both at the MGM Grand Hotel & Casino in Las Vegas. This partnership between the two chefs featured menus which combined both chefs’ specialties and, in 2010, earned three Michelin stars.

In 2019, Le Tohic opened ONE65 in San Francisco, a six-story multi-concept. ONE65 features four completely distinct designs and cuisines: ONE65 Patisserie & Boutique, Alexander's Steakhouse, Elements at ONE65 (a bar and lounge), and O’ by Claude Le Tohic.

== Awards and honors ==
- Meilleur Ouvrier de France, 2004
- James Beard Foundation Winner, Best Chefs in America 2010.
- Michelin Guide three-star rating
- Michelin Guide one-star rating for his work at O' by Claude Le Tohic, 2021
- International Catering Cup (ICC) World Champion, 2023
