= L'Atelier de Joël Robuchon (Miami) =

French restaurant in Miami, Florida, U.S.

- Interactive map of L'Atelier de Joël Robuchon

Restaurant information
- Established: August 2019; 6 years ago
- Head chef: Christophe Bellanca
- Chef: Alain Verzeroli
- Pastry chef: Salvatore Martone
- Food type: French
- Rating: (Michelin Guide)
- Location: 151 NE 41st Street, Miami, Florida, 33137, United States
- Coordinates: 25°48′52″N 80°11′31.5″W
- Seating capacity: 34

L'Atelier de Joël Robuchon is a Michelin-starred French restaurant in Miami's Design District, Florida. According to The Infatuation, the fine dining establishment has a "cool, futuristic interior and counter seating with a great view of the open kitchen".

== Reception ==
In 2023, Thrillist included the business in lists of Miami's 15 most romantic restaurants and 12 best places to eat alone.

== See also ==
- L'Atelier de Joël Robuchon
- Joël Robuchon
- List of French restaurants
- List of Michelin-starred restaurants in Florida
- List of restaurants in Miami
