= Álvaro Clavijo Martínez =

Álvaro Clavijo Martínez is a Colombian chef and restaurateur based in Bogotá, Colombia. He is the founder and head chef of El Chato, a restaurant recognized in international rankings including The World's 50 Best Restaurants.

== Early life and education ==
Clavijo was born and raised in Bogotá, Colombia. He received his formal culinary training at the Hofmann School of Hospitality in Barcelona, Spain. He spent three years at the institution, gaining technical experience while working in the school's Michelin-starred restaurant. He later returned to Paris to complete further studies at Le Cordon Bleu.

== Career ==
=== Early career ===
After gaining international experience, he worked in some of the world's top restaurants, including establishments in Paris, Per Se in New York, and L’Atelier de Joël Robuchon in New York. During his time at Noma in Denmark, he deepened his commitment to local and sustainable ingredients, which shaped his approach to cooking. Clavijo later returned to Bogotá, where he founded El Chato with the goal of placing Colombian gastronomy on the global stage.

=== El Chato ===
In 2017, Clavijo founded El Chato in Bogotá, a restaurant dedicated to contemporary Colombian cuisine with a strong emphasis on locally sourced ingredients from across the country's diverse regions. The restaurant quickly established itself as one of the leading voices in modern Latin American gastronomy.

In 2018, El Chato entered Latin America's 50 Best Restaurants as the highest new entry, ranked No. 21. Over the following years, it continued to gain international recognition for its progressive interpretation of Colombian cuisine and its consistent presence in regional rankings.

In 2025, El Chato was ranked No. 1 in Latin America's 50 Best Restaurants, becoming the first Colombian restaurant to achieve the top position in the history of the list. This recognition marked a defining milestone for both Clavijo and contemporary Colombian gastronomy.

== Awards and recognition ==
Clavijo has received recognition from The Best Chef Awards, where he was awarded Three Knives in 2024 and 2025. His restaurant, El Chato has appeared in The World's 50 Best Restaurants, including No. 83 in 2022 (extended list), No. 33 in 2023, and No. 25 in 2024.
