= List of Michelin-starred restaurants in the American Southwest =

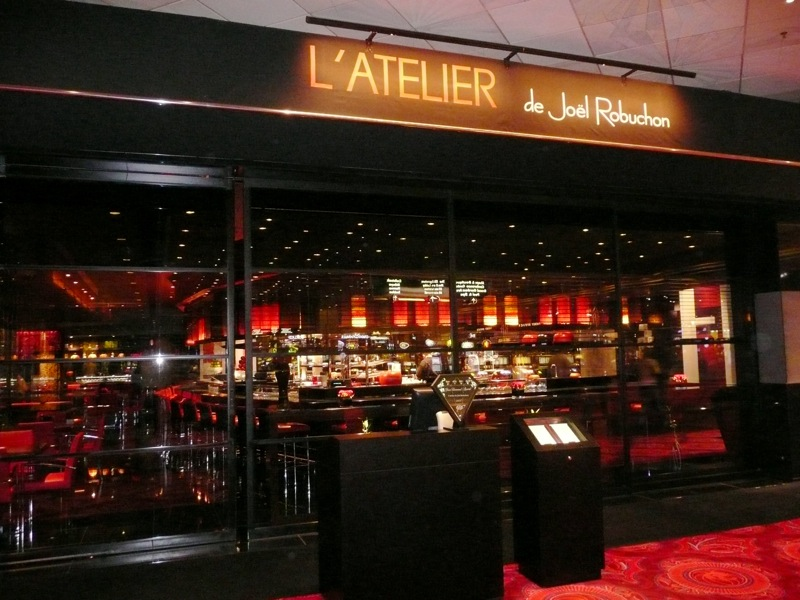
L'Atelier de Joël Robuchon, Las Vegas

As of the 2026 guide, there are 5 restaurants in the American Southwest with a Michelin-star rating. Michelin classifies the region as the states of Arizona, Nevada, New Mexico, and Utah.

The Michelin Guides have been published by the French tire company Michelin since 1900. They were designed as a guide to tell drivers about eateries they recommended to visit and to subtly sponsor their tires, by encouraging drivers to use their cars more and therefore need to replace the tires as they wore out. Over time, the stars that were given out started to become more valuable.

Multiple anonymous Michelin inspectors visit the restaurants several times. They rate the restaurants on five criteria: "quality of products", "mastery of flavor and cooking techniques", "the personality of the chef represented in the dining experience", "value for money", and "consistency between inspectors' visits". Inspectors have at least ten years of expertise and create a list of popular restaurants supported by media reports, reviews, and diner popularity. If they reach a consensus, Michelin awards restaurants from one to three stars based on its evaluation methodology: One star means "high-quality cooking, worth a stop", two stars signify "excellent cooking, worth a detour", and three stars denote "exceptional cuisine, worth a special journey". The stars are not permanent and restaurants are constantly being re-evaluated. If the criteria are not met, the restaurant will lose its stars.

The Michelin Guide was published for Las Vegas in 2008 and 2009 and covered restaurants located on the Las Vegas Strip, areas to the east and west of the Strip as well as Downtown Las Vegas. In 2010, the publication of the Michelin Guide was suspended for Las Vegas citing the economic climate.

In December 2025, Michelin announced it will once again review restaurants in Las Vegas, alongside the rest of Nevada as well as Arizona, New Mexico, and Utah as part of the Michelin Guide in the American Southwest, which debuted in August 2026.

== Lists ==
=== American Southwest (2026) ===
Key
1 Michelin star	One Michelin star
2 Michelin stars	Two Michelin stars

Michelin-starred restaurants
Name	Cuisine	Location	2026
é by José Andrés	Spanish	Nevada – Las Vegas	1 Michelin star
Joël Robuchon	French	Nevada – Las Vegas	2 Michelin stars
L'Atelier de Joël Robuchon	French	Nevada – Las Vegas	1 Michelin star
Monte	American	Utah – South Salt Lake	1 Michelin star
Restaurant Guy Savoy	French	Nevada – Las Vegas	1 Michelin star
Reference(s)			

=== Las Vegas (2008–2009) ===
Key
1 Michelin star	One Michelin star
2 Michelin stars	Two Michelin stars
3 Michelin stars	Three Michelin stars
—	The restaurant did not receive a star that year
Closed	The restaurant is no longer open

Michelin-starred restaurants
Name	Cuisine	Location	2008	2009	2010–2025 No guide
Alex	French	Las Vegas Strip – Wynn Las Vegas	2 Michelin stars	2 Michelin stars	Closed (2011)
Alizé	French	Paradise – Palms Casino Resort	1 Michelin star	1 Michelin star	Closed (2017)
Andre's	French	Las Vegas – Downtown	1 Michelin star	1 Michelin star	Closed (2009)
Aureole	New American	Las Vegas Strip – Mandalay Bay	1 Michelin star	1 Michelin star	Closed (2023)
Bradley Ogden	American	Las Vegas Strip – Caesars Palace	1 Michelin star	1 Michelin star	Closed (2012)
Daniel Boulud Brasserie	French	Las Vegas Strip – Wynn Las Vegas	1 Michelin star	1 Michelin star	Closed (2010)
DJT	New American	Las Vegas Strip – Trump Las Vegas	—	1 Michelin star	
Restaurant Guy Savoy	French	Las Vegas Strip – Caesars Palace	2 Michelin stars	2 Michelin stars	
Joël Robuchon	French	Las Vegas Strip – MGM Grand	3 Michelin stars	3 Michelin stars	
L'Atelier de Joël Robuchon	French	Las Vegas Strip – MGM Grand	1 Michelin star	1 Michelin star	
Le Cirque	French	Las Vegas Strip – Bellagio	1 Michelin star	1 Michelin star	Closed (2026)
Mesa Grill	Southwestern	Las Vegas Strip – Caesars Palace	1 Michelin star	—	Closed (2020)
Michael Mina	Seafood	Las Vegas Strip – Bellagio	1 Michelin star	1 Michelin star	
Mix	Contemporary	Las Vegas Strip – Mandalay Bay	1 Michelin star	1 Michelin star	Closed (2015)
Nobu	Japanese	Paradise – Hard Rock (Note: The location was originally known as the Hard Rock and later rebranded to Virgin Hotels. This is not to be confused with the location known as The Mirage which was subsequently rebranded to the Hard Rock)	1 Michelin star	1 Michelin star	
Picasso	French	Las Vegas Strip – Bellagio	2 Michelin stars	2 Michelin stars	Closed (2024)
Restaurant Charlie	Seafood	Las Vegas Strip – The Palazzo	—	1 Michelin star	Closed (2010)
Wing Lei	Chinese	Las Vegas Strip – Wynn Las Vegas	1 Michelin star	1 Michelin star	
Reference(s)					

== See also ==
- List of Michelin 3-star restaurants in the United States
- List of Michelin Bib Gourmand restaurants in the United States
- List of restaurants in the Las Vegas Valley

== Bibliography ==
- Michelin Guide Las Vegas 2008. Michelin Travel Publications. 2008. ISBN 978-2-06-712989-4.
- Michelin Guide Las Vegas 2009. Michelin Travel Publications. 2009. ISBN 978-2-06-713709-7.
