= Rochat =

Rochat is a surname, most commonly found in Switzerland and the Vendee region of France. Estimates count up to 12'500 living cousins with this last name. The Rochat Surname is the third most common surname in the canton of Vaud in Switzerland

== History ==
Historians believe the common ancestor of the Rochat people to be Vinet Rochat, a metalworker who migrated across the border from France into the Vallee de Joux region of Switzerland with his three sons around 1480. The Rochat surname was associated with successful metallurgy and watchmakery. Since then, the surname has spread across Romandy, the south of France and parts of eastern Tennessee, where the first Swiss people settled in America. The Geneanet database counts more than 97'000 occurrences of this surname (and variants such as Rochad, Rochas or Rouchas) all throughout history.

Surnames such as Rochet and Ferreux have been proven to be related to Rochat family, the surname Ferreux would have come from their work as Blacksmiths as fer is the French translation of Iron.

In 2024, over 200 people sharing this surname came together in l'Abbaye to inaugurate the Rochejean trail going from L'abbaye to Rochejean in honor of their common ancestor Vinet Rochat who would have traveled along this same path.

== Notable Family members ==
- Alain Rochat (born 1983), Swiss footballer
- André Rochat, French chef and restaurateur
- Andree Aeschlimann Rochat (1900-1990), Swiss composer and music critic
- Charles-Antoine Rochat (1892–1975), French diplomat
- Franziska Rochat-Moser (1966–2002), Swiss long-distance runner
- Laurence Rochat (born 1979), Swiss cross-country skier
- Philippe Rochat (1953–2015), Swiss chef
- Philippe Rochat (aviation), Secretary-General of the International Civil Aviation Organization (1991-1997)
- Philippe Rochat (psychologist) (born 1950), Swiss developmental psychologist
