= West Street, London =

Street in London

Coordinates: 51°30′47.02″N 0°7′41.63″W

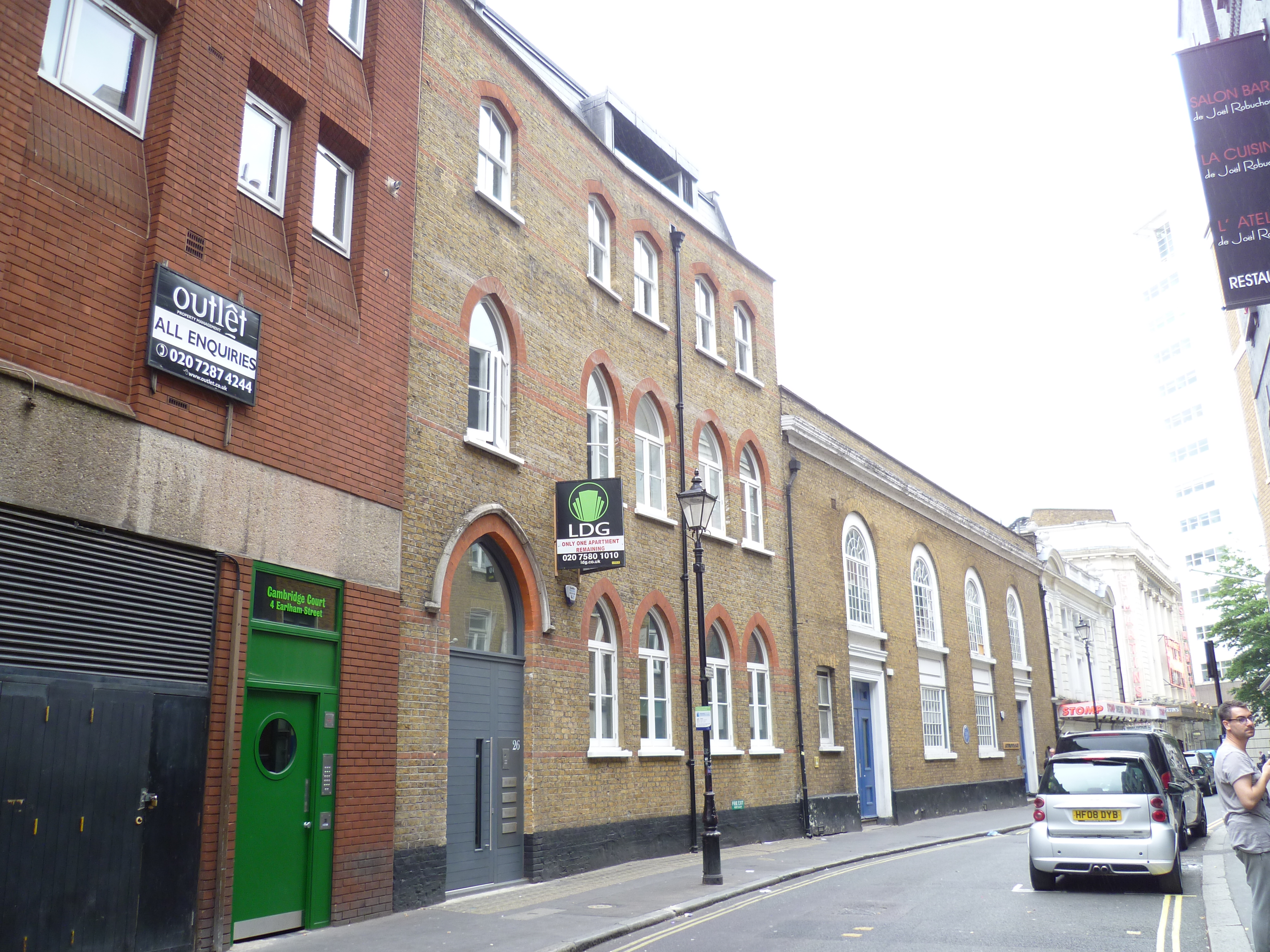
West Street with the former Methodist chapel.

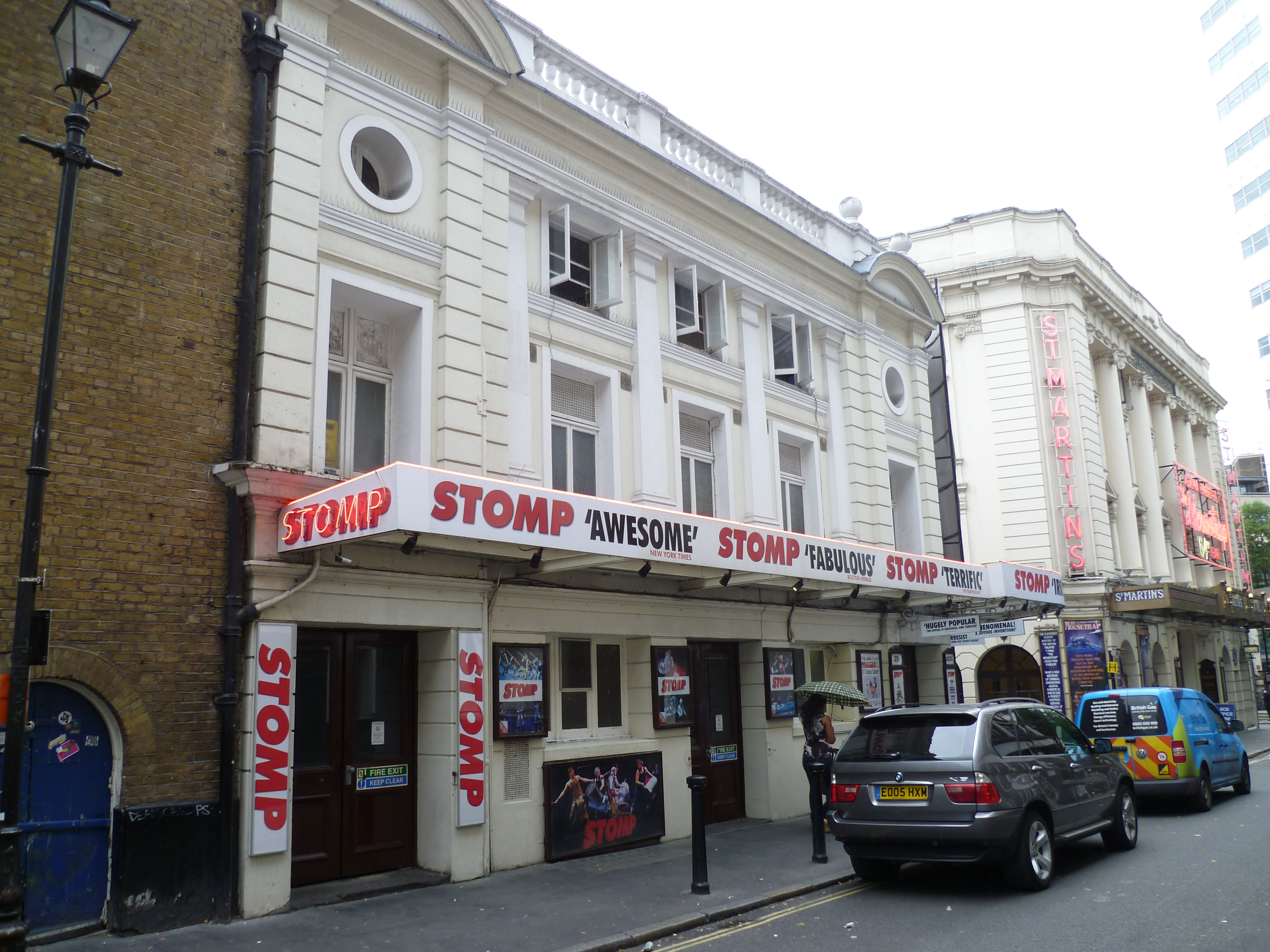
The Ambassadors Theatre with the St Martin's Theatre in the background.

West Street is a street in London, that runs from Shaftesbury Avenue in the north to Upper St Martin's Lane in the south. It is joined by Litchfield Street on its south side and the pedestrian Tower Court on the north side. The east side of the street is in the London Borough of Camden and the western side in the City of Westminster.

== Buildings ==
At number 26 is the West Street Chapel, where John Wesley, the joint founder of Methodism, once preached.

Also located in West Street are the Ambassadors Theatre and the St Martin's Theatre which has staged the production of The Mousetrap since March 1974, making it the longest continuous run of any show in the world.

The London branch of L'Atelier de Joël Robuchon is located in the street.

The Ivy restaurant and The Club at The Ivy are located on the corner with Litchfield Street.

In the early 1950s, the Central School of Music and Dance was at No 15.
