= Essential by Christophe =

French restaurant in New York City, U.S.

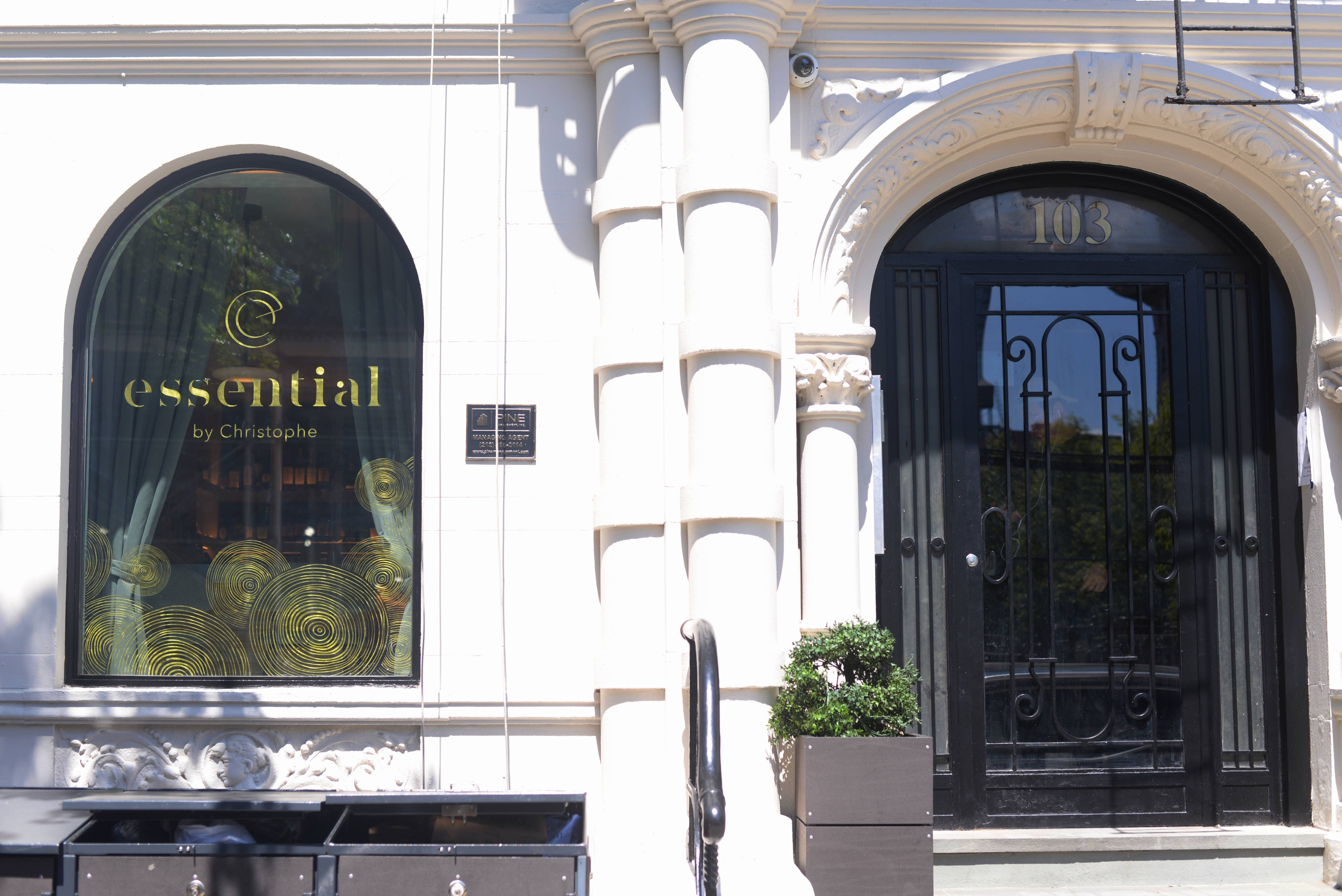
- Front view of Essential by Christophe.
- Interactive map of Essential by Christophe

Restaurant information
- Established: December 2022
- Chef: Christophe Bellanca
- Food type: French
- Rating: (Michelin Guide)
- Location: 103 West 77th Street, New York City, New York, 10024, United States
- Coordinates: 40°46′51.3″N 73°58′35.9″W
- Website: essentialbychristophe.com

Essential by Christophe is a French restaurant located in the Upper West Side neighborhood in New York City, United States. The restaurant has received a Michelin star. Christophe Bellanca is the chef and owner. Essential opened in December 2022.

== Accolades and reviews ==
- Awarded 1 Michelin star in 2023. As of the 2025 Michelin Guide, it maintains this rating.
- The New York Post in 2025 named it the "best restaurant on the Upper West Side."
- Wine Spectator "Best of Award of Excellence" in 2025.

== See also ==
- List of French restaurants
- List of Michelin-starred restaurants in New York City
