= Charlie Palmer (chef) =

American chef

Charlie Palmer (born 1959) is an American chef, hospitality entrepreneur, hotelier, and author. He is best known for Aureole, his flagship restaurant in New York City and Las Vegas, which has earned 15 Michelin stars and two James Beard awards. Considered a “pioneer of progressive American cooking,” Palmer has received more than 20 Michelin stars and owns and manages more than 15 restaurants and three hotels via Charlie Palmer Collective and Appellation Hotels.

== Career ==
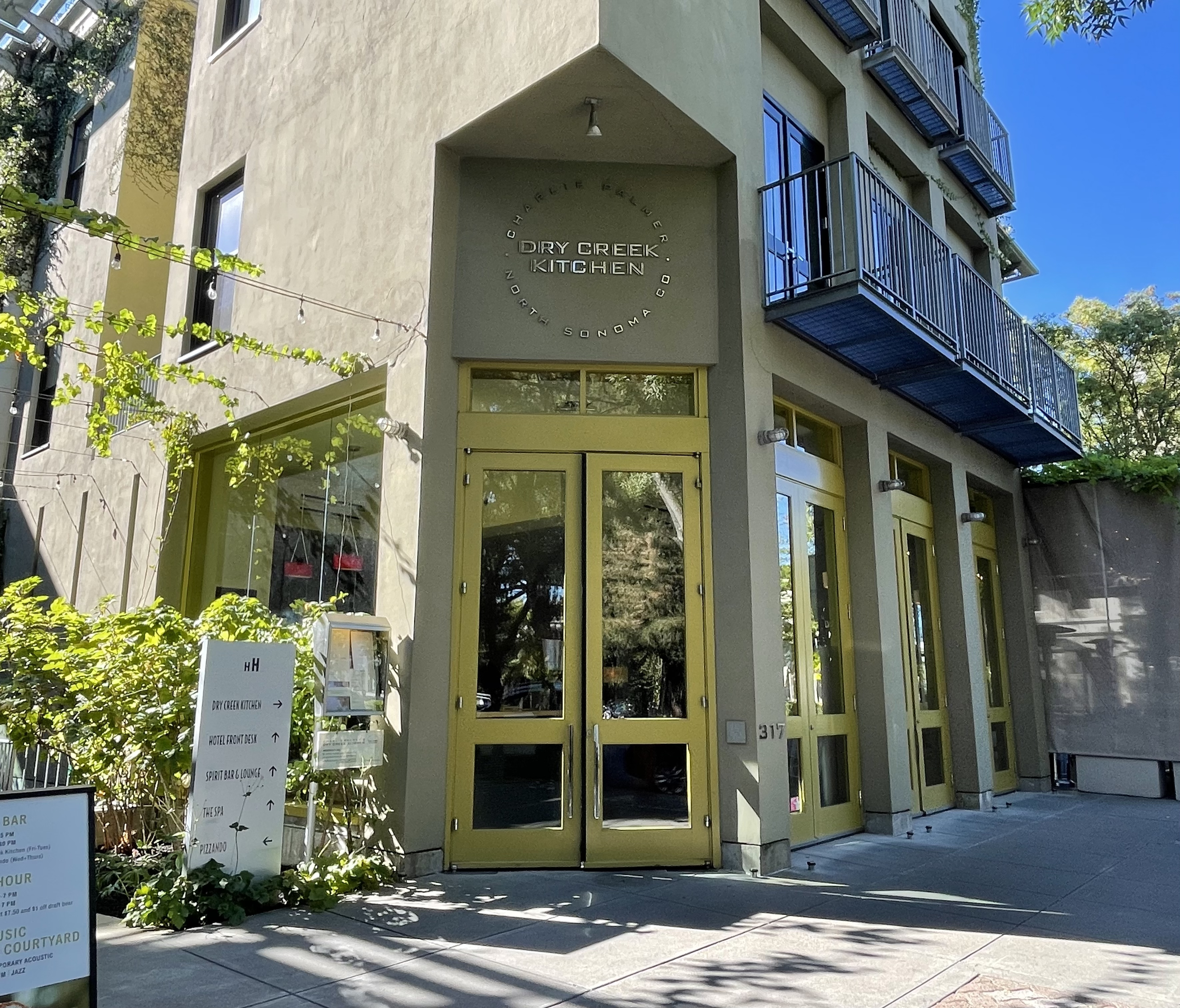
Charlie Palmer's Dry Creek Kitchen in Healdsburg, California.

After graduating from The Culinary Institute of America, Palmer worked in several restaurants including La Côte Basque and Palmer became executive chef while working at The River Café in 1983, where he earned three stars from The New York Times and trained Michael Mina.

In 1988, Palmer opened his restaurant Aureole in Manhattan, where he showcased regional American ingredients. In 1999, he opened Aureole in the Mandalay Bay Resort, Las Vegas as well as a modern American steakhouse, Charlie Palmer Steak in The Four Seasons.

In 2009, Aureole moved its NYC location to One Bryant Park in midtown Manhattan.

In March 2021, Palmer converted Aureole New York to Charlie Palmer Steak NYC. In April 2024, Charlie Palmer opened the newest iteration of its steakhouse concepts, Charlie Palmer Steak IV, located on the 4th floor of The Knickerbocker Hotel.

In October 2022, he opened AperiBar, an aperitif-focused eatery the Luma Hotel in Time Square.

In 2018, Palmer and hotelier Christopher Hunsberger announced their launch of Appellation, a culinary-first hotel brand. The brand's first new-build, luxury hotel, Appellation Healdsburg opened in September 2025, along with the debut of Appellation Lodi - Wine & Roses Resort and Spa in June 2025, with additional concepts planned in Pacific Grove, Morgan Hill, and Petaluma, California, as well as Park City, Utah. Each hotel will feature a signature Charlie Palmer restaurant and bar as well as interactive culinary demonstrations.

=== Television ===
Palmer was one of sixteen chefs in the 1993 PBS series, Cooking with Master Chefs: Hosted by Julia Child and is included in the cookbook derived from the series.

In 2020, Palmer launched a video series titled American Artisan where he highlights Wine Country artisans. He is also a guest on NBC's Today Show, Bravo's Top Chef, and The Rachael Ray Show.

== Awards ==
The James Beard Foundation named him "Best Chef in America" in 1997 and incorporated him as a member of their "Who's Who of Food & Beverage in America" in 1998.

In 2003, Palmer was awarded the Silver Spoon Award by Food Arts Magazine

In 2011, Palmer was inducted into the Gaming Hall of Fame.

Palmer's support of his alma mater earned him a seat on The Culinary Institute of America's board of trustees where he served as chairman of the board from 2013 to 2016. The school presented him with an honorary doctorate in April 2018 and an honoree of its Walk of Fame in 2025.

Nine of Palmer’s restaurants have been granted the Award of Excellence by Wine Spectator from 2001-2025.

== Restaurants ==
=== Active ===
- Akoya
- AperiBar (NYC)
- AVA Social and Spyglass Rooftop Bar (Archer Hotel, NYC)
- Cattleman's Bar
- Charlie Palmer at The Knick (NYC)
- St. Cloud Rooftop Bar (Knickerbocker Hotel, NYC)
- Jake's @ the Knick
- Charlie Palmer Steak (Reno, Nevada)
- Dry Creek Kitchen (Hotel Healdsburg, California)
- Folia Bar & Kitchen (Appellation Hotel, Healdsburg, California)

=== Defunct ===
- Aureole at Mandalay Bay (Las Vegas)
- Aureole (NYC)
- Charlie Palmer Steak at Four Seasons (Las Vegas)
- Charlie Palmer Steak NYC
- Charlie Palmer Steak (Washington, D.C.)
- Charlie Palmer Steak and Sky & Vine Rooftop Bar (Archer Hotel, Napa, California)

== Cookbooks ==
- Great American Food (Random House, 1996)
- Charlie Palmer's Casual Cooking (Harper Collins, 2001)
- The Art of Aureole (Ten Speed, 2002)
- Charlie Palmer's Practical Guide to the New American Kitchen (Melcher, 2006)
- Remington Camp Cooking by Charlie Palmer (Charlie Palmer Group, 2013)
- Charlie Palmer's American Fare (Grand Central Life & Style, 2015)
- Wineland by Charlie Palmer with Matt Villano (Hachette Book Group, 2026)
