= Tara Khattar =

Lebanese chef and writer

- Education: Institut Paul Bocuse; New York University
- Known for: First Middle Eastern participant on Top Chef France
- Culinary career
- Cooking style: Progressive Lebanese
- Television show: Chopped on Food Network
- Website: tarakhattar.com

Tara Khattar (Arabic: تارا خطار; born 1992) is a Lebanese chef, who was the first person from a Middle Eastern country to compete on Top Chef France. She also won the competition Chopped on Food Network on two occasions.

== Career ==
Born in Lebanon, Khattar's grandmothers taught her how to cook as a child. One grandmother was from Aleppo, the other one from Achrafieh; they were both differently influenced by the cuisines of their home regions. She studied for a BA in International Management of Culinary Arts at the Institut Paul Bocuse, graduating in 2013. She subsequently worked at l’Atelier de Joël Robuchon Saint-Germain in Paris. She then moved to New York to study for an MA in Food Studies at New York University.

In 2018 she was the first person from the Middle East to participate in the television programme Top Chef France, when she joined the show. This led to her describing her style of cookery as 'progressive Lebanese'. She subsequently won the competition Chopped on Food Network twice. In 2020 her first book, Liban, was published in French and Arabic.

== Books ==
- Liban: Une histoire de cuisine familiale, d'amour et de partage (Hachette Practique 2020)
