= DB Brasserie =

Defunct Restaurant in Las Vegas

- Interactive map of DB Brasserie

Restaurant information
- Established: April 2014; 12 years ago
- Closed: January 2017; 9 years ago
- Location: 3325 South Las Vegas Blvd, Paradise, Nevada, United States
- Coordinates: 36°7′27.063″N 115°10′5.775″W

DB Brasserie was a restaurant owned by chef Daniel Boulud that operated in Las Vegas from 2014 to 2017.

== Location ==
DB Brasserie was located within The Palazzo in Las Vegas. It was Boulud's second venture in the city, following the original Daniel Boulud Brasserie, which operated at Wynn Las Vegas from 2005 until 2010 and received a Michelin star in 2008 and 2009. The space previously housed a Valentino (fashion house) boutique, before being converted into a dining venue. DB Brasserie faced the casino floor and the promenade leading to the resort's Grand Canal Shoppes and restaurant row. The interior was designed by Jeffrey Beers International.

== Staff ==
The restaurant was led by chefs David Middleton and Vincent Pouessel. In addition to a list of cocktails, there was a 300-bottle wine cellar, created by Boulud's wine director Daniel Johnnes and the restaurant's sommelier, Devin Zendel, focusing on American and French wines.

== Closure ==
DB Brasserie closed to allow Chef Boulud to focus on his other ventures through his Dinex Group. After its closure, the space was repurposed by Chica, a Latin-inspired restaurant.

== See also ==
- List of Michelin-starred restaurants in Las Vegas
