= L'Atelier de Joël Robuchon (Tokyo) =

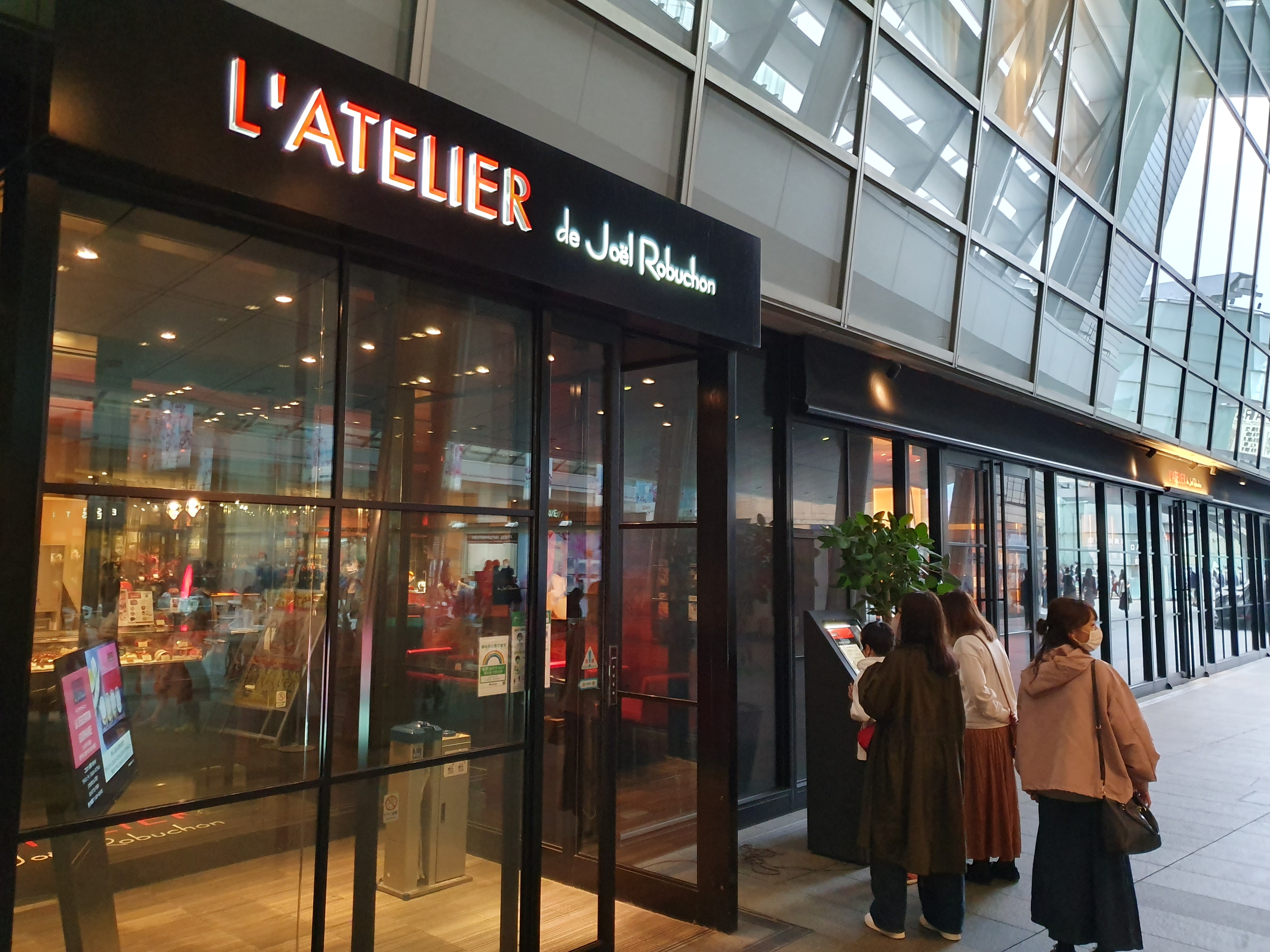
- image of L'Atelier de Joel Robuchon restaurant
- Interactive map of L'Atelier de Joël Robuchon

Restaurant information
- Owner: Joël Robuchon
- Food type: French
- Rating: (Michelin Guide)
- Location: 六本木6−10−1 六本木ヒルズ ヒルサイド2F, Minato, Tokyo, 106-0032, Japan
- Reservations: Required
- Website: www.robuchon.jp/latelier-en

L'Atelier de Joël Robuchon is a Michelin 1-star French restaurant located in Minato, Tokyo, Japan. The restaurant is part of the L'Atelier de Joël Robuchon family of restaurants.

== See also ==
- List of French restaurants
- List of Michelin-starred restaurants in Japan
