= Monte (restaurant) =

Restaurant in South Salt Lake, Utah, U.S.

- Monte's location inside Beehive Distilling
- Interactive map of Monte

Restaurant information
- Established: 2025
- Head chef: Martín Babío
- Food type: American
- Rating: (Michelin Guide)
- Location: 2245 S W Temple Street, South Salt Lake, Utah, United States
- Coordinates: 40.7221°N 111.8934°W
- Website: monteslc.com

Monte is a Michelin-starred restaurant in South Salt Lake, Utah, United States. It opened in 2025. It is the first restaurant in Utah to receive a Michelin star.

== See also ==
- List of Michelin-starred restaurants in the American Southwest
