= L'Atelier de Joël Robuchon (London) =

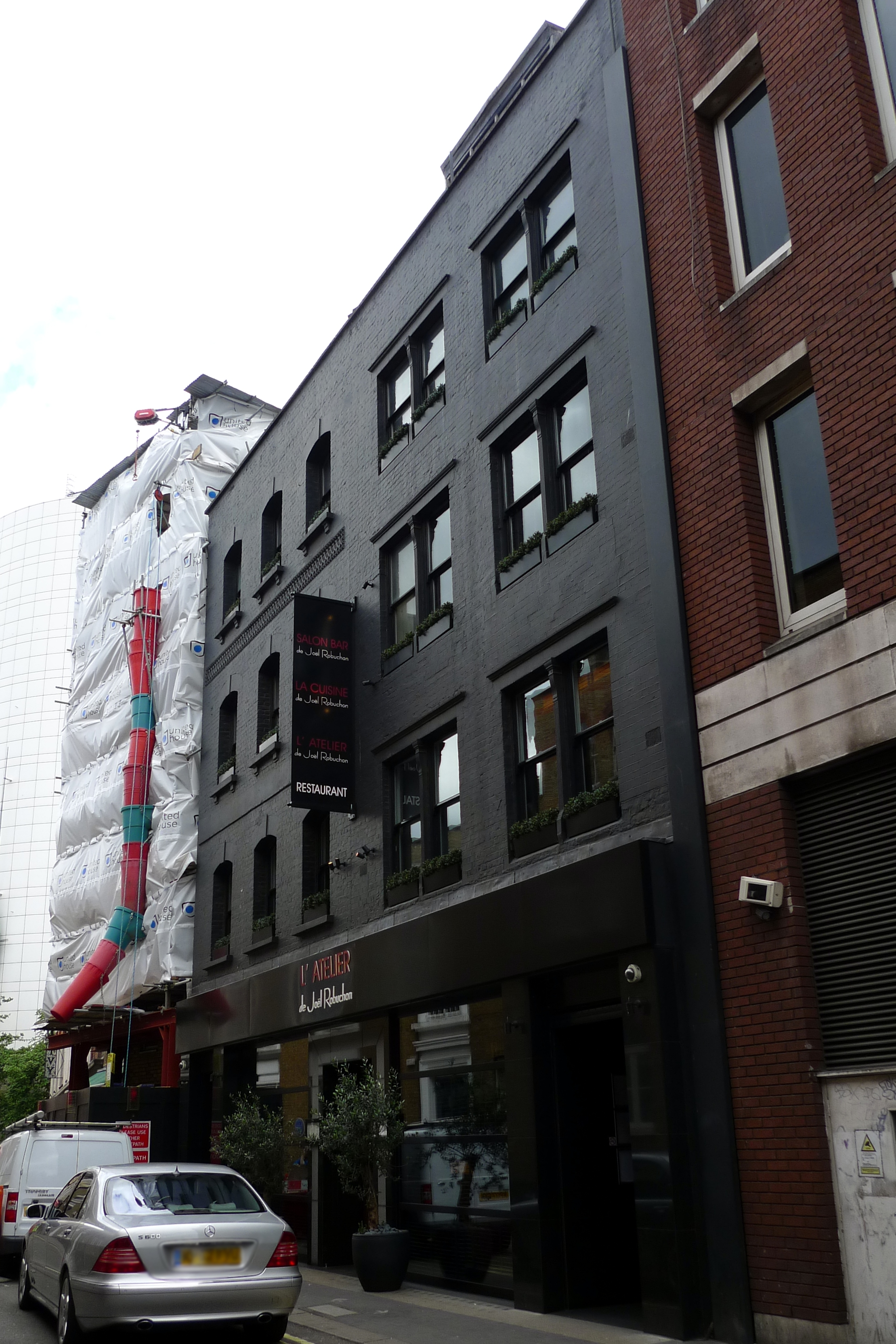
- L'Atelier de Joël Robuchon, Covent Garden

- Location in the London Borough of the City of Westminster

Restaurant information
- Established: 2006; 20 years ago
- Closed: April 2019; 7 years ago
- Chef: Joël Robuchon
- Food type: French cuisine
- Rating: Michelin star
- Location: West Street, London, WC2, United Kingdom
- Coordinates: 51°30′47″N 0°7′42″W
- Other information: Nearest station: Leicester Square

L'Atelier de Joël Robuchon was a Michelin-starred restaurant in West Street, Covent Garden, in the City of Westminster, London. The restaurant spanned three floors, with the counter on the ground floor, the tables and restaurant on the first floor, and the salon bar and terrace on the upper floor. The restaurant was run by French celebrity chef, Joël Robuchon, while the executive chef was Jeremy Page.

== Description ==
The restaurant was northwest of Covent Garden, two doors from restaurant The Ivy. It was opened in 2006, with the L'Atelier ground floor promising no-reservations required outside of 5pm to 7pm, which at the time caused some consternation for food critics who wished to review it. As with the other L'Atelier restaurants, the seating is laid out around an open kitchen, with the entire floor of the building decorated in black and red. La Cuisine is on the second floor, which is a formal sit down restaurant, and there is a bar on the third floor. It is one of twelve L'Atelier de Joël Robuchons around the world. The executive chef of the restaurant was Jeremy Page, and the Chef Patron was Joël Robuchon. Page, who previously worked in other Robuchon restaurants, took over from Xavier Boyes after his departure.

== Reception ==
Joe Warwick in the book Eat London says of it, "the ground floor is a low-lit combination of black and red that makes it look like a giant bento box at battle with a 80s cocktail bar. Customers sit along a sleek shiny counter and eat small plates of some of possibly the most exquisiste seasonal French cooking currently in London." Donald Strachan of Frommer's says of the restaurant, "for the most dramatic effect, eat at Atelier's counter. Here you can watch the theatre of the chefs producing tapas-style dishes - small bombshells of taste as in beef and foie gras mini-burger; pig's trotter on parmesan toast; and the signature egg cocotte with wild mushroom cream, all wildly inventive and beautifully presented. The a la carte menu follows the conventional three course approach, using superb ingredients." Time Out in its London edition, described the interior of the restaurant as a "smart if slightly dated bento-box aesthetic of shiny reds and blacks", but praised the quality of the food overall, in particular the onglet with polenta.

Jay Rayner visited the restaurant for The Observer shortly after it opened. After waiting forty minutes for a seat in the bar area which he described as "like being locked in a PVC fetishist's knicker drawer", he described the open kitchen design as a "joyous experience". However, he disliked some elements of the food, including Robuchon's take on spaghetti bolognese to which he remarked "Sun-dried tomatoes and olives in a bolognese? Oi! Robuchon! NO!" but thought that the sweetbreads were exemplary, and enjoyed the other elements of the meal. Matthew Norman ate at the restaurant following its opening for The Guardian, giving it a score of 8/10 overall, stating "what we most admired about the cooking was the lack of fuss and poncery". The Independent's Terry Durack also visited around the same time, and thought that while the pricing structure was a "nightmare", he gave it a score of 16/20 which marked the restaurant as being "capable of greatness".

== See also ==
- List of French restaurants
- List of Michelin starred restaurants
- List of Michelin 3-star restaurants in the United Kingdom
- L'Atelier de Joël Robuchon
