= Christophe Bellanca =

French chef

- Born: Christophe Bellanca
- Occupation: Chef
- Culinary career
- Current restaurant: Essential by Christophe

Christophe Bellanca is a French chef and restaurateur at Essential by Christophe, a Michelin-starred french restaurant in New York City.

== Early years ==
Bellanca started his career working in many renowned restaurants in France including Georges Blanc, La Pyramide under Patrick Henriroux in Vienne, Régis Marcon in Saint-Bonnet-le-Froid, and six years with Anne-Sophie Pic at Maison Pic in Valence.

In 2004, Bellanca moved to the United States and worked at L’Orangerie in Los Angeles. After a meeting with Thomas Keller, Bellanca moved to New York City and was executive chef at Le Cirque. He later worked at Aureole.

== L’Atelier de Joël Robuchon ==
Beginning in 2011, Bellanca was the Culinary Director for Joël Robuchon USA, overseeing L'Atelier de Joël Robuchon in New York and Miami which received a 2 Michelin star rating.

== Essential by Christophe ==
In 2022, Bellanca opened Essential by Christophe, a french contemporary restaurant on the Upper West Side of New York City. It received one Michelin star in 2023, a rating it still holds as of 2025.
