= Andre's =

Defunct restaurant in Las Vegas, Nevada, U.S.

- Interactive map of Andre's

Restaurant information
- Head chef: Andre Rochat
- Food type: French
- Rating: (Michelin Guide)
- Location: 401 S. 6th Street, Las Vegas, Nevada, United States
- Coordinates: 36.1649°N 115.1415°W
- Website: andrelv.com

Andre's was a Michelin-starred French restaurant in downtown Las Vegas, Nevada, United States.

It was helmed by André Rochat, a French-born chef who previously worked in Boston and New Orleans, among other locations. He opened Andre's on 6th Street in 1980.

At the time, there were few fine dining options on the Las Vegas strip; food was focused on buffets and a few steakhouses catering to corporate clients. Andre's brought traditional Escoffier-style French food with tableside service.

The restaurant received a Michelin star in 2008 and 2009, the only years in which the Michelin Guide rated restaurants in the area. The restaurant closed in 2009.

== See also ==
- List of defunct restaurants of the United States
- List of French restaurants
- List of Michelin-starred restaurants in Las Vegas
