= DJT (restaurant) =

Restaurant in Las Vegas, Nevada, U.S.

- Interactive map of DJT

Restaurant information
- Food type: American
- Location: 2000 Fashion Show Drive, Las Vegas, Nevada, 89109, United States
- Coordinates: 36°07′47″N 115°10′22″W
- Website: www.trumphotels.com/las-vegas/dining/fine-dining-las-vegas

DJT is a restaurant in the Trump International Hotel Las Vegas, in the U.S. state of Nevada. The restaurant serves American cuisine and received a Michelin star in 2009.

== Description ==
Named for Donald J. Trump, DJT is a restaurant and bar in the Trump International Hotel Las Vegas, with a menu of modern American cuisine. The restaurant serves breakfast, lunch, and dinner, and has a lounge offering cocktails and small plates in the evenings.

== History ==
Sydney Jones became the executive sous chef of the hotel in November 2014; in this role, he oversaw DJT as well as in-room dining and events at the hotel. Antonio Olvera and Andrew Almanza debuted new cocktails in 2015.

== See also ==
- List of Michelin-starred restaurants in Las Vegas
- List of New American restaurants
- List of restaurants in the Las Vegas Valley
