= Joël Robuchon (Las Vegas restaurant) =

Coordinates: 36.1026°N 115.1705°W

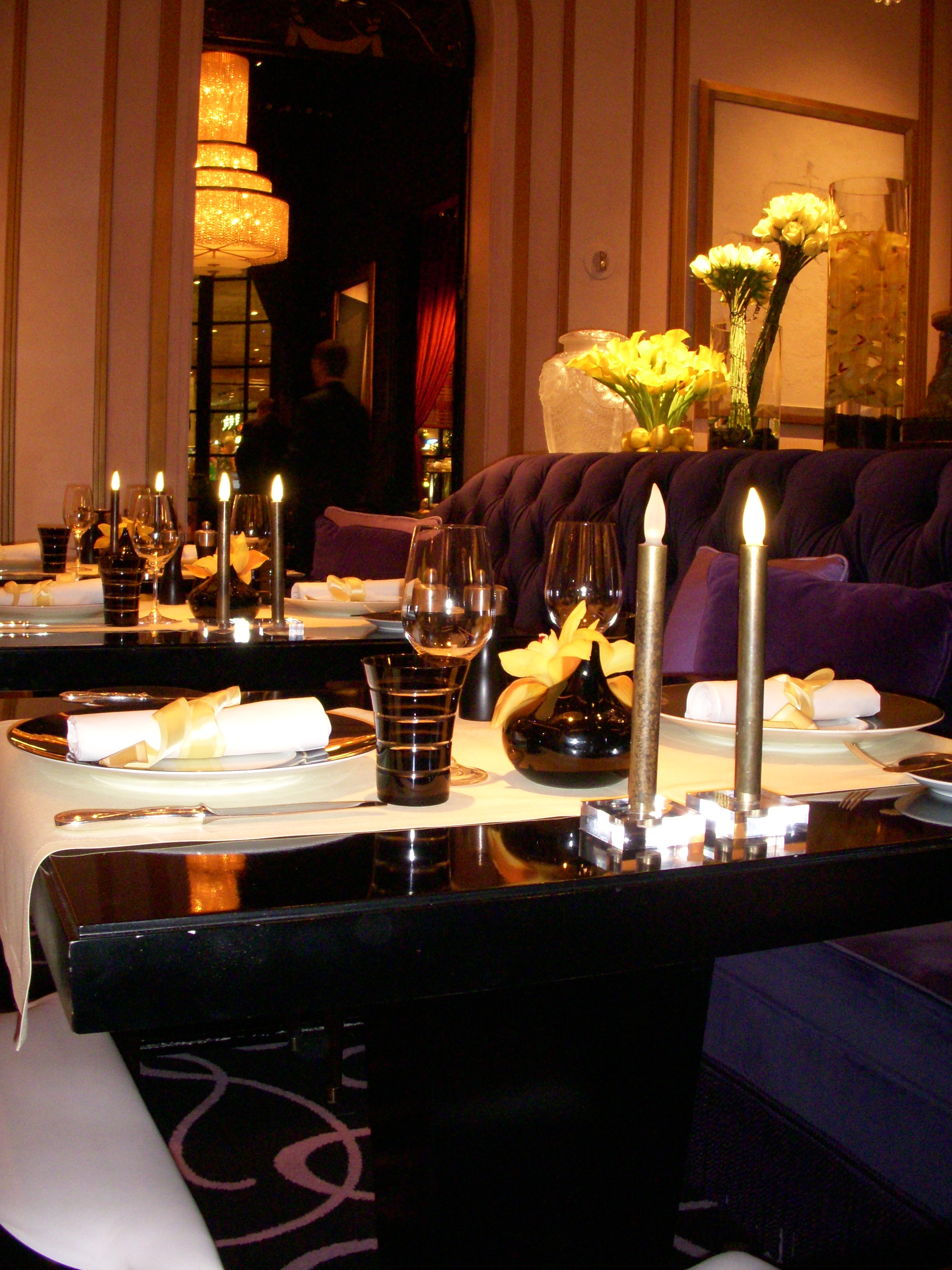
- Main Dining Room; Joël Robuchon
- Interactive map of Joël Robuchon

Restaurant information
- Established: 2006; 20 years ago
- Owner: Joël Robuchon
- Head chef: Eleazar Villanueva
- Food type: Gourmet French
- Dress code: Jacket Requested
- Rating: (Michelin Guide)
- Location: 3799 S Las Vegas Blvd. (inside the MGM Grand Las Vegas hotel), Las Vegas, Nevada, 89109, United States
- Reservations: Strongly Recommended
- Website: https://jrobuchon.com/our_locations/restaurant-de-joel-robuchon-las-vegas/

Joël Robuchon is a French gourmet restaurant opened by French chef and restaurateur Joël Robuchon. The restaurant, located at the MGM Grand Las Vegas in Las Vegas, Nevada, was rated 3 stars in 2009 by the Michelin Guide, 5-stars by Forbes Travel Guide, and has been ranked by Wine Spectator and Travel and Leisure to be among the finest restaurants in the world. It was ranked as one of the Top 5 best restaurants in the United States by Gourmet magazine in 2011.

== Cuisine ==
The French cuisine is offered either as a prix fixe or an a la carte menu. There are 12 tables in the main dining room.

== Awards and accolades ==
- 5 Stars, 2024 Forbes Travel Guide
- 5 Diamonds, 2006-2024 AAA Restaurant Ratings
- 3 Stars, 2008 and 2009 Michelin Guide (Note: Michelin Guide stopped reviewing the Las Vegas market in 2009.)
- 2006, Top 5 Best Restaurants in the United States, Gourmet magazine
- 2007, Travel and Leisure "Best New Restaurant in the World"
- 2007, French Restaurant, Best Chef in Las Vegas, Life Epicurean Awards
- 2009, Wine Spectator "Grand Award"
- 2009, The Laurent Perrier 2009 Lifetime Achievement Award at The S.Pellegrino World's 50 Best Restaurants
- 2026, 2 Stars, Michelin Guide

== See also ==
- L'Atelier de Joël Robuchon
- List of Michelin 3-star restaurants in the United States
- List of Michelin-starred restaurants in the American Southwest
- List of restaurants in the Las Vegas Valley
