= André Rochat =

French chef

André Rochat is a retired French chef and restaurateur best known for his Michelin-starred Las Vegas-based restaurants Andre's and Alizé.

== Early years ==
Born in the French Alps, Rochat learned about the food business from his family, who owned a meat preparation business, in the village of La Rochette in Savoy, France. Rochat left France in 1965 and moved to Boston. He worked in various East Coast hotels including Boston's Charter House and the Mayflower Hotel in Washington, D.C. as well as a stint as an in-flight chef for United Airlines.

In 1973, he opened his Savoy French Bakery in Las Vegas on the corner of Flamingo and Maryland Parkway.

== Andre’s ==
In 1980, Rochat opened Andre’s, a French restaurant located in Downtown Las Vegas. The restaurant would feature a rustic ambiance. Andre's would go on to receive Michelin one-star ratings in 2008 and 2009 (the only two years the Michelin Guide rated Las Vegas restaurants) as well as AAA four-diamond ratings. The downtown location would close in 2009. Upon closure, Rochat commented, “Real nice place…Wrong location.”

Andre’s Restaurant & Cigar Lounge opening at the Monte Carlo on the Las Vegas Strip in 1997. Andre's had a cigar bar and lounge with a library featuring Rochat's collection of hundreds of cookbooks. It contained a large wine cellar, as well as what the restaurant called "one of the widest selections of cognacs, armagnacs and after-dinner drinks in North America." The restaurant would be a multi-year recipient of the AAA 4-diamond rating. The Monte Carlo location would close in October 2016.

== Alizé ==
Rochat opened Alizé at the Palms Casino Resort on the Las Vegas Strip in 2001. A fine dining establishment that served French cuisine would be located at the top floor of the casino/hotel. Alizé would go on to receive Michelin one-star ratings in 2008 and 2009 (the only two years the Michelin Guide rated Las Vegas restaurants). The restaurant would close in 2017.

== Andre’s Bistro & Bar ==
In 2016, Andre’s Bistro & Bar opened in Summerlin but it was short-lived and closed in 2018. Rochat requested that his name no longer be associated with this restaurant that was to be an homage to him after the closure of Andre's at the Monte Carlo.

== Awards and accolades ==
- 2008: James Beard Foundation Award, Semifinalist, “Outstanding Restaurateur”
- 2014: Lifetime Achievement Award from the Nevada Restaurant Association

== See also ==
- List of Michelin-starred restaurants in Las Vegas
