= Trump International Hotel Las Vegas =

Hotel in Paradise, Nevada, U.S.

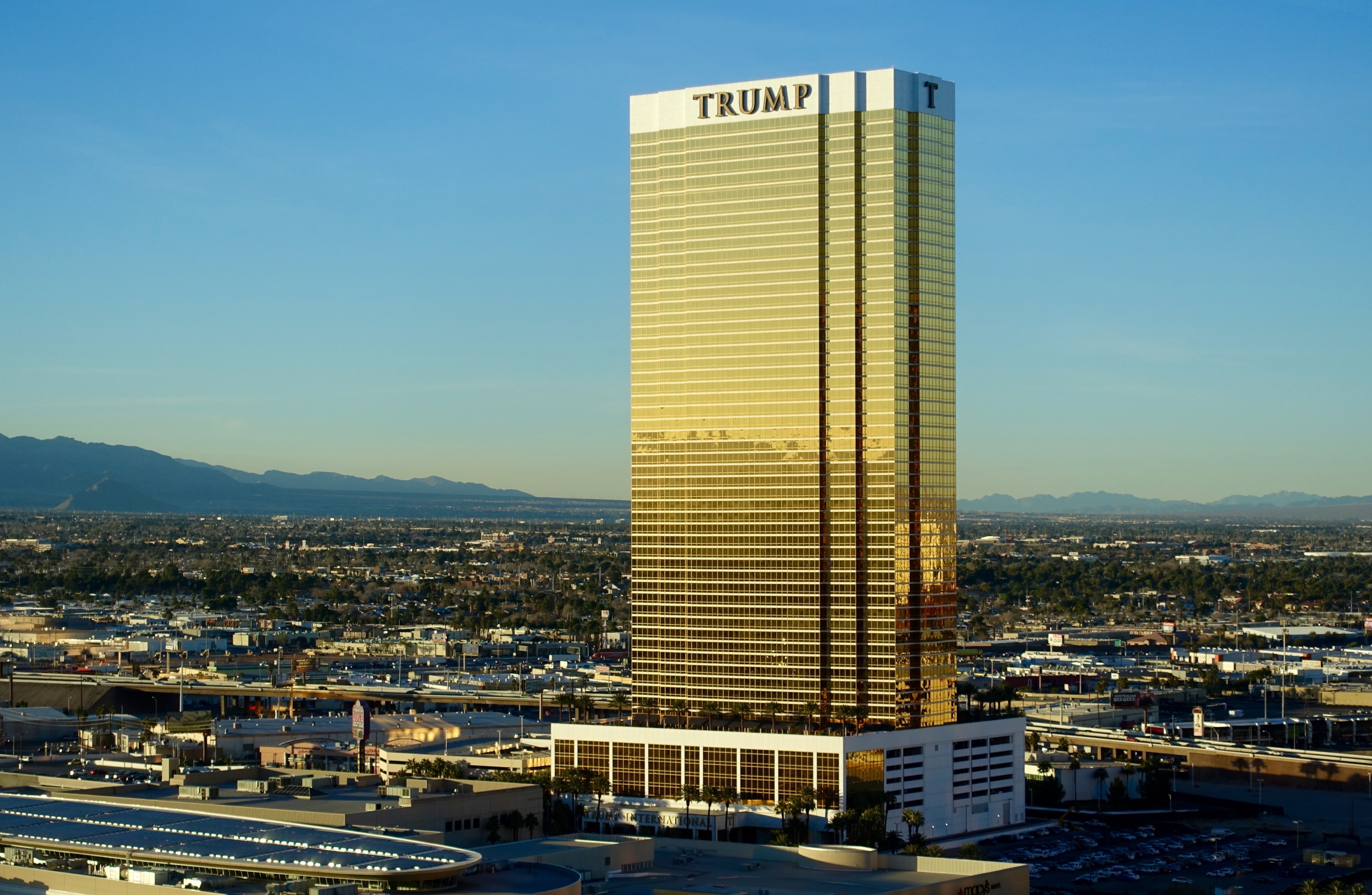
- Trump International Hotel Las Vegas, January 2017
- Interactive map of the Trump International Hotel Las Vegas area

General information
- Type: Condo hotel
- Location: Paradise, Nevada, U.S., 2000 Fashion Show Drive
- Coordinates: 36°07′47″N 115°10′22″W
- Groundbreaking: July 12, 2005; 20 years ago
- Construction started: November 2005
- Topped-out: May 25, 2007; 18 years ago
- Opened: March 31, 2008; 17 years ago
- Owner: Phil Ruffin (50%); The Trump Organization (50%)
- Management: The Trump Organization

Height
- Height: 622 feet (190 m)

Technical details
- Floor count: 64
- Floor area: 185,805 m^{2} (1,999,990 sq ft)

Design and construction
- Developer: The Trump Organization

Other information
- Number of suites: 1,282
- Number of restaurants: 2
- Parking: 550

Website
- trumphotels.com/las-vegas

The Trump International Hotel Las Vegas is a 64-story hotel, condominium, and timeshare located on Fashion Show Drive in Paradise, Nevada, United States, named for part owner Donald Trump. It is located down the street from Wynn Las Vegas, behind the former site of the New Frontier Hotel and Casino on 3.46 acres (14,000 m^{2}), near the Fashion Show Mall, and features both non-residential hotel condominiums and residential condominiums. The exterior glass is infused with gold.

The hotel opened on March 31, 2008, with 1,282 rooms. It has two restaurants: DJT, the developer's initials, and a poolside restaurant, H2(eau). Trump announced that a second, identical tower would be built next to the first tower, but the plan was suspended after the mid-2000s recession. It is Las Vegas's tallest residential building at 622 feet (190 m). In September 2012, the Trump Organization announced that it sold roughly 300 condominium units in Trump International Hotel Las Vegas to Hilton Worldwide's timeshare division, Hilton Grand Vacations.

== History ==
=== Early years ===
In April 2002, Phil Ruffin announced that he had partnered with Donald Trump to build Trump Tower Las Vegas, a $300 million 60-story condominium tower with 300 units and the possibility of a casino, to be constructed on Fashion Show Drive, near Ruffin's New Frontier Hotel and Casino. Trump had initially approached Ruffin two years earlier about developing a property on or near the Las Vegas Strip. Construction on Trump Tower Las Vegas was to begin in six to seven months and was expected to last approximately 18 months. In August 2003, Ruffin said the tower had been decreased to 43 stories and was expected to cost $272 million.

In November 2003, Trump denied that the project had been delayed or that it was suffering from a lack of financing. Trump also said he was considering "something on a larger scale" for the project. In July 2004, Ruffin said the project had been delayed up to that point because of other business ventures, including Trump's reality television show, The Apprentice. That month, Trump and Ruffin announced revised plans for Trump International Hotel and Tower, a $300 million condominium-hotel with over 1,000 units. Although Trump held a Nevada gaming license, he chose not to include a casino on the property. Donald Trump's son Eric Trump later said, "We have no problem getting a gaming license, but we wanted to do something different here. We wanted a true luxury resort experience. It's hard to have a high-quality product when you walk into 'ding, ding, ding' and there are people walking around in Hawaiian shirts with big plastic drink mugs."

Ruffin appeared in an October 2004 episode of The Apprentice to sign a $300 million deal with Trump regarding the project. The project was referenced again in the show's second-season finale, when winner Kelly Perdew was offered a job at the property. Jack Wishna, who introduced Trump to Ruffin, was a minority partner in the project. In January 2005, the project was valued at $1 billion. Groundbreaking was initially scheduled for May 2005, with completion expected by the end of 2006. By May 2005, all of the tower's 1,282 condominium units had been reserved by prospective buyers.

Trump and Ruffin held a groundbreaking ceremony for the project on July 12, 2005. The Las Vegas Review-Journal wrote that the event was "really a ribbon-cutting and photo opportunity". News programs such as Access Hollywood and Extra provided coverage of the event, which was attended by approximately 300 state and local government representatives, as well as Carolyn Goodman, showgirls, Steve Wynn and his wife Elaine Wynn, and Miss USA 2005 winner Chelsea Cooley.

Condominium units went on sale the same day with the opening of a $3 million temporary sales center at the corner of South Las Vegas Boulevard and Fashion Show Drive, in front of the New Frontier. The building was 8,100 sq ft (750 m^{2}), and featured a 10-foot replica of the tower. That month, an NBA team was in negotiations to purchase an entire floor of the tower, while Trump was considering an alternative version of The Apprentice that would involve the tower. Construction was expected to begin by the end of that summer, and was expected to last 24 to 30 months.

Construction began in November 2005, when the building's foundation was poured. After the completion of a 36,000-square-foot recreational deck in March 2006, an average of 800 workers constructed one new floor for the tower approximately every six days. The tower was topped out on May 25, 2007. The project was constructed at a cost of $500 million, on 3 acres (1.2 ha) of land that was part of the rear parking lot for the New Frontier. The project was designed by Bergman, Walls & Associates and built by Perini Building Company.

Trump Hotel Las Vegas opened on March 31, 2008. An opening ceremony was held by Trump and Ruffin on April 11, 2008. By October 2008, only 21 percent of condo unit sales had closed, as potential buyers had trouble securing mortgages. As of 2013, Eric Trump oversees operations at the tower.

==== Second Tower proposal ====
By April 2005, a second, identical 64-story tower was being planned. Sales of the second tower were planned to begin by the end of 2005, with a 35 percent increase in prices from the first tower. In November 2005, the second tower was planned to open sometime in 2009.

In April 2007, the second tower was the subject of an episode of The Apprentice in which the show's candidates were tasked with creating a marketing program for the new tower. Condo units for the tower went on sale the next day. Trump said the tower would be nearly identical to the first tower, and would also include 1,282 units. Because of rising construction expenses, the second tower was expected to cost $625 million, which would have brought the total cost of Trump International Hotel and Tower to $1.1 billion. This number was later reported to be $1.2 billion in February 2008, at which point the second tower was expected to begin construction at the end of the year.

In April 2008, Trump said he had not decided on a start date for the second tower, choosing to wait until all sales had closed on the first tower's rooms. At that time, reservations were still being accepted for the second tower's units. The second tower was ultimately put on hold because of bad credit markets. In August 2015, Eric Trump spoke of the potential for the second tower: "I think in time it's a very good possibility."

=== Recent history ===
==== Labor relations ====
On December 4–5, 2015, employees voted in favor of unionizing the hotel property. It was organized by the Bartenders Union and the Culinary Workers Union and supervised by the National Labor Relations Board (NLRB) under the Obama administration. Donald Trump owns a penthouse on the 61st floor.

==== 2023 death of Diana Truschke ====
In 2025, the property was sued for wrongful death following the death of Diana Truschke, a 78-year-old woman from California. Truschke died from injuries she sustained after being ejected by a revolving door at the property. The suit claims that employees at the property should have been aware of the door malfunctioning and that it was not complying with safety regulations. The incident occurred when she was attempting to exit the property in March 2023. Truschke died in October 2023 as a result of injuries she sustained at the property. The family is suing on the grounds of negligence, negligent hiring and negligent training.

==== Potential sale of property ====
In 2024, there were discussions over whether or not the property might be sold or seized by New York Attorney General Letitia James following Donald Trump's civil fraud trial in New York. The property could sell for $1.3 billion to $1.7 billion. This speculation occurred prior to Donald Trump winning the 2024 United States presidential election.

==== 2025 Tesla Cybertruck explosion ====
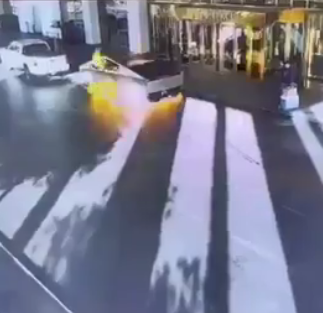
A CCTV still of the moment the Tesla Cybertruck exploded

On January 1, 2025, a rented Tesla Cybertruck exploded and caught fire in the valet area of the hotel resulting in the death of the driver, Matthew Livelsberger, and seven injuries. Authorities believe fireworks, gasoline, and gas tanks were connected to a detonator operated by Livelsberger. The incident was investigated by Las Vegas police and the FBI as a potential terrorist attack, but was later confirmed as a suicide. It was not connected to the truck attack in New Orleans which took place earlier that day. Elon Musk stated that Tesla's senior team is investigating the explosion using telemetry last reported by the Cybertruck, and also concluded that the explosion was not caused by the vehicle, but fireworks and/or a bomb in the bed of the vehicle. Livelsberger's body was recovered from the vehicle, and seven bystanders were treated for injuries. The vehicle had fireworks-style mortars on board.

== DJT restaurant ==
The DJT restaurant is a full-service New American restaurant at the hotel.

== Gallery ==
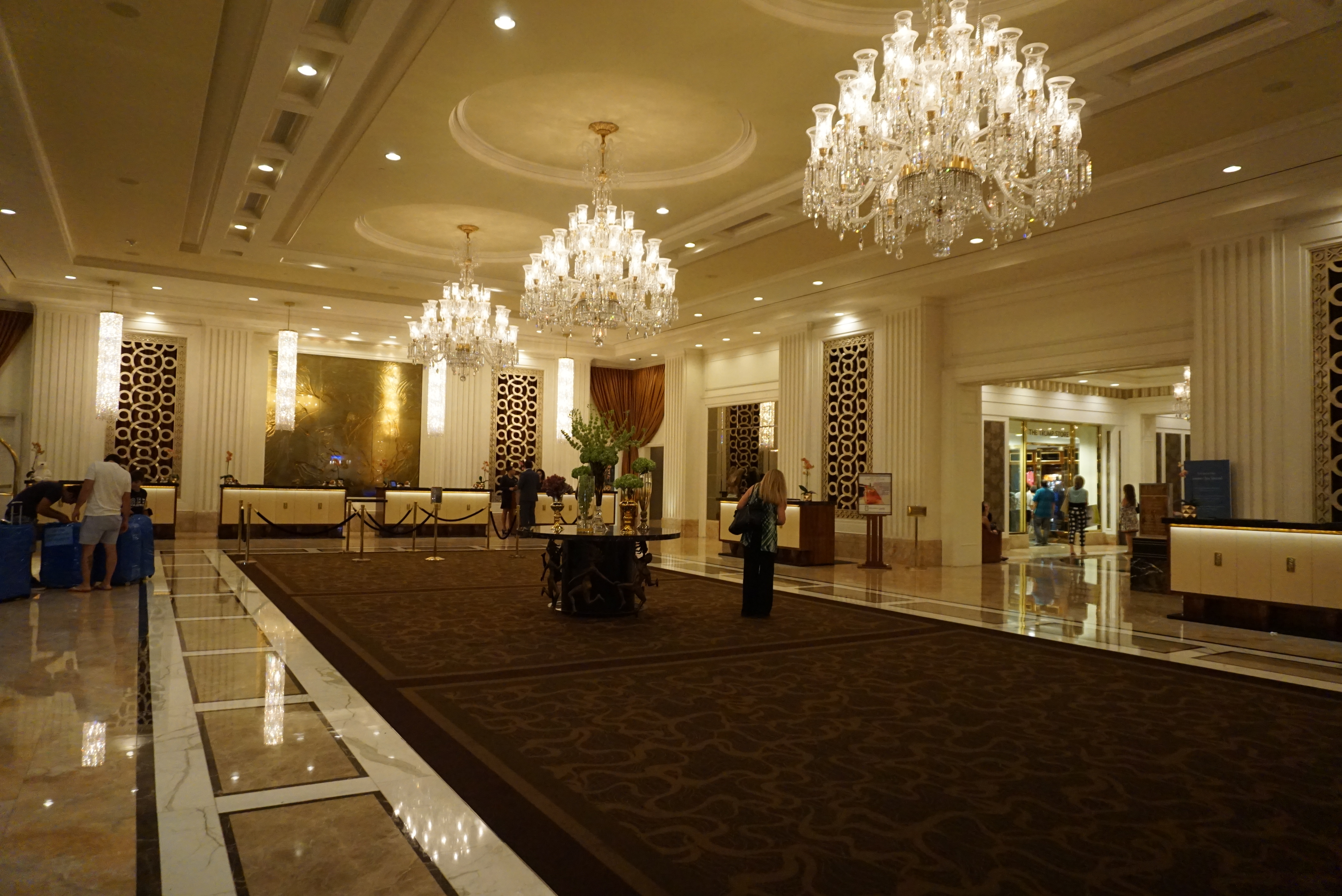
Lobby

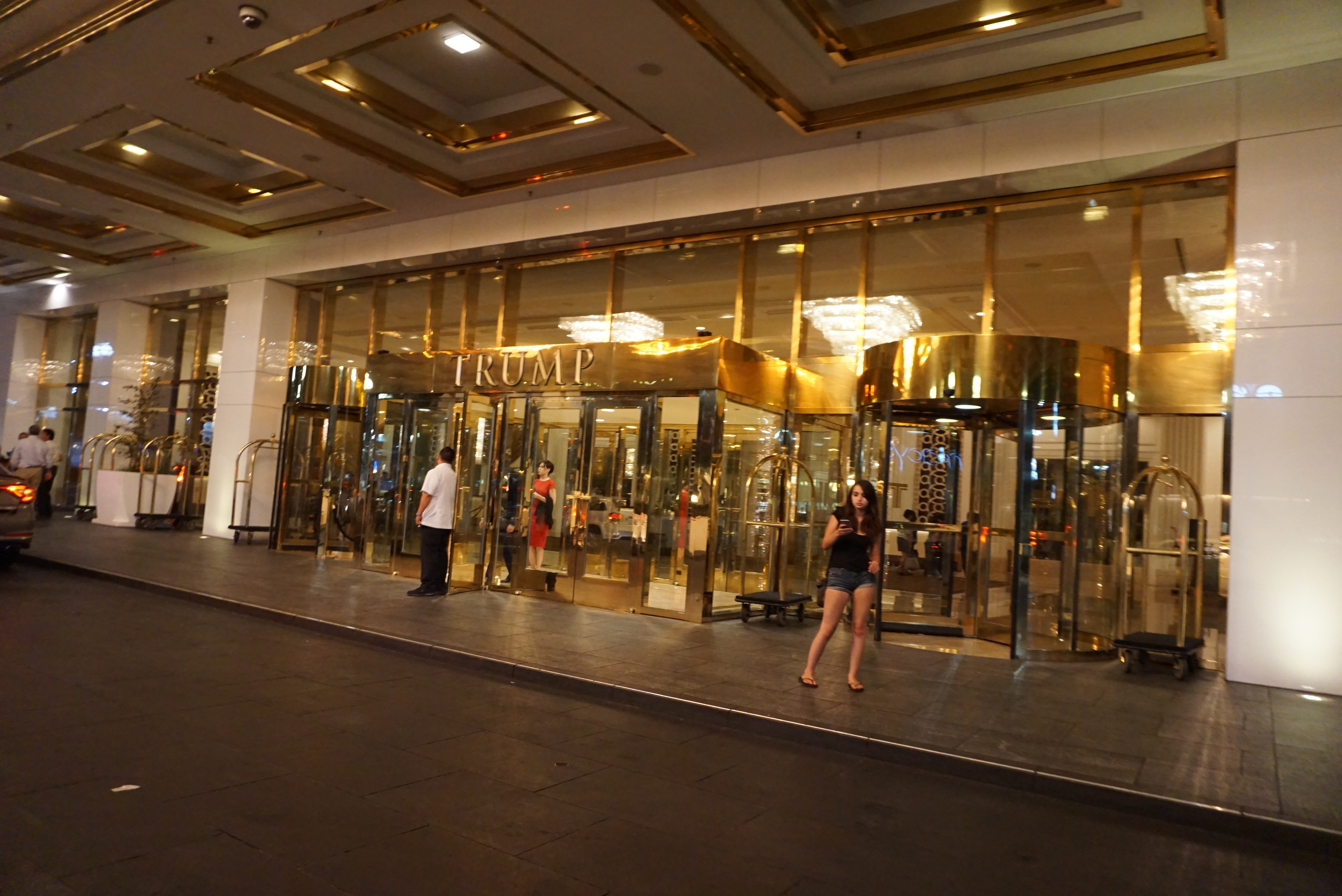
Entrance

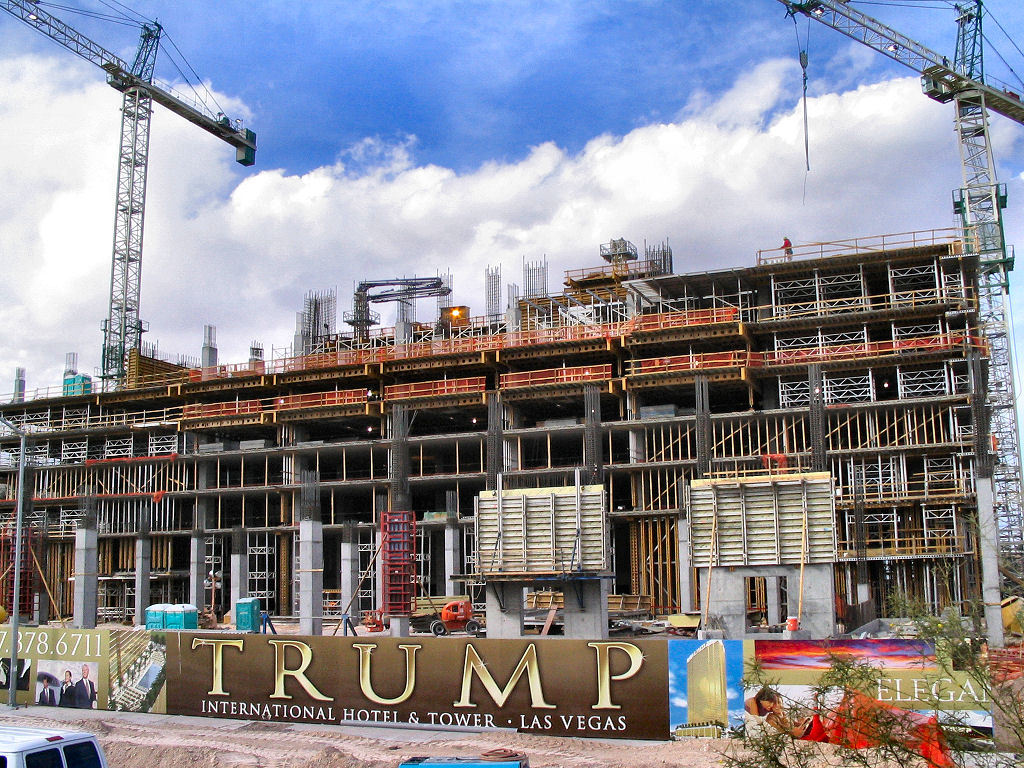
Construction in March 2006

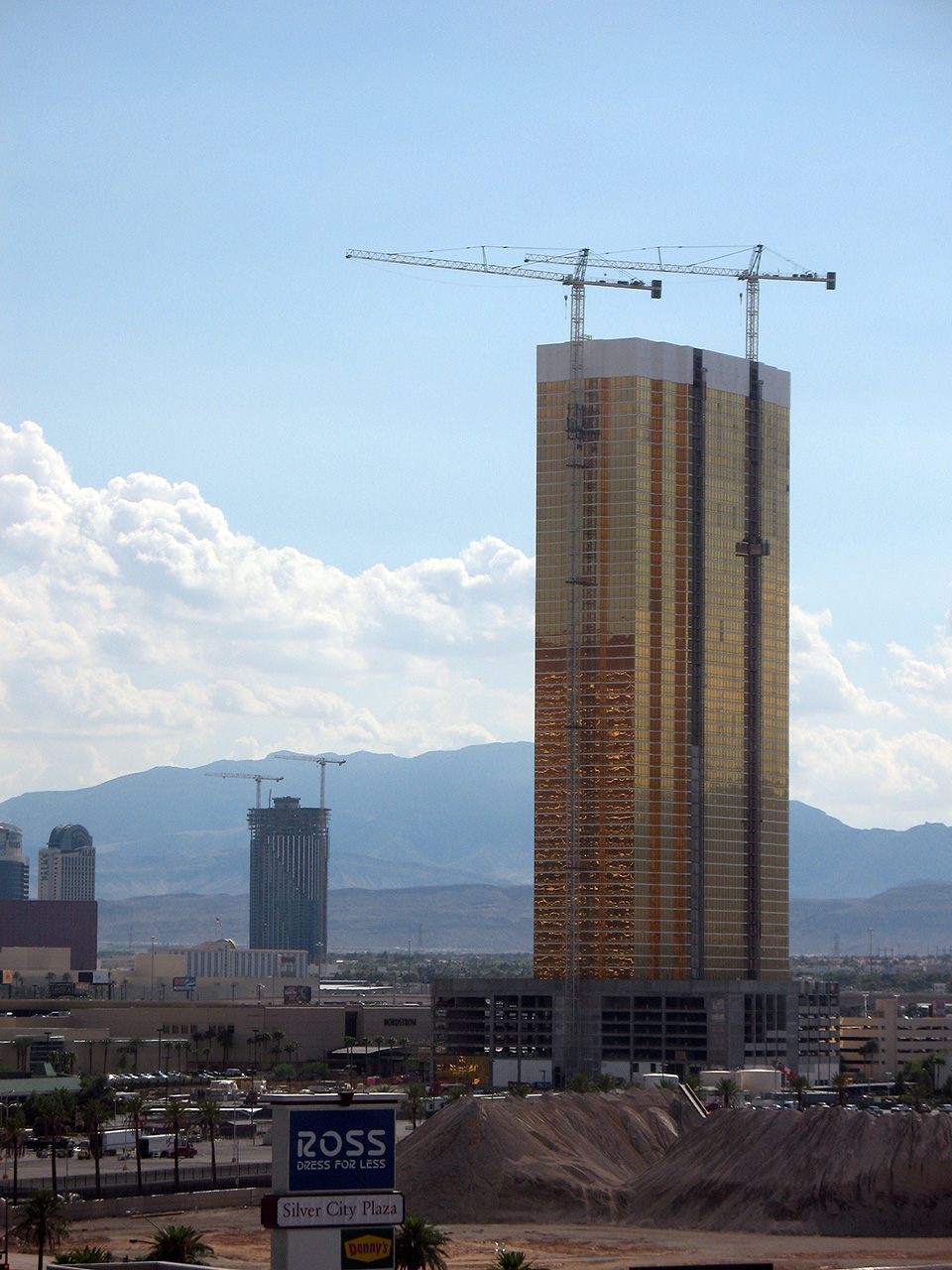
Construction photo taken in August 2007 from the Riviera Hotel and Casino

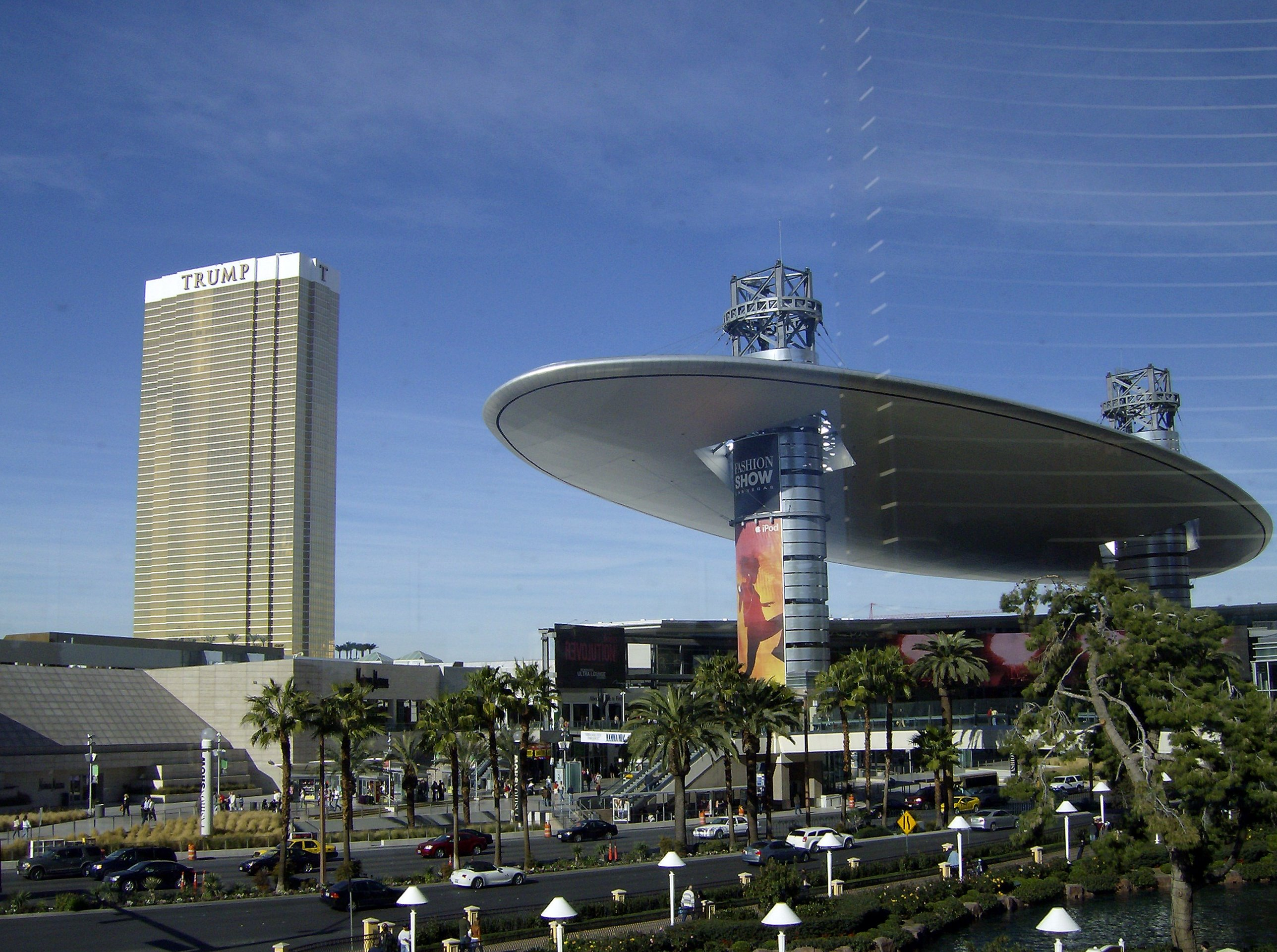
Completed first tower as seen from south of Wynn Las Vegas

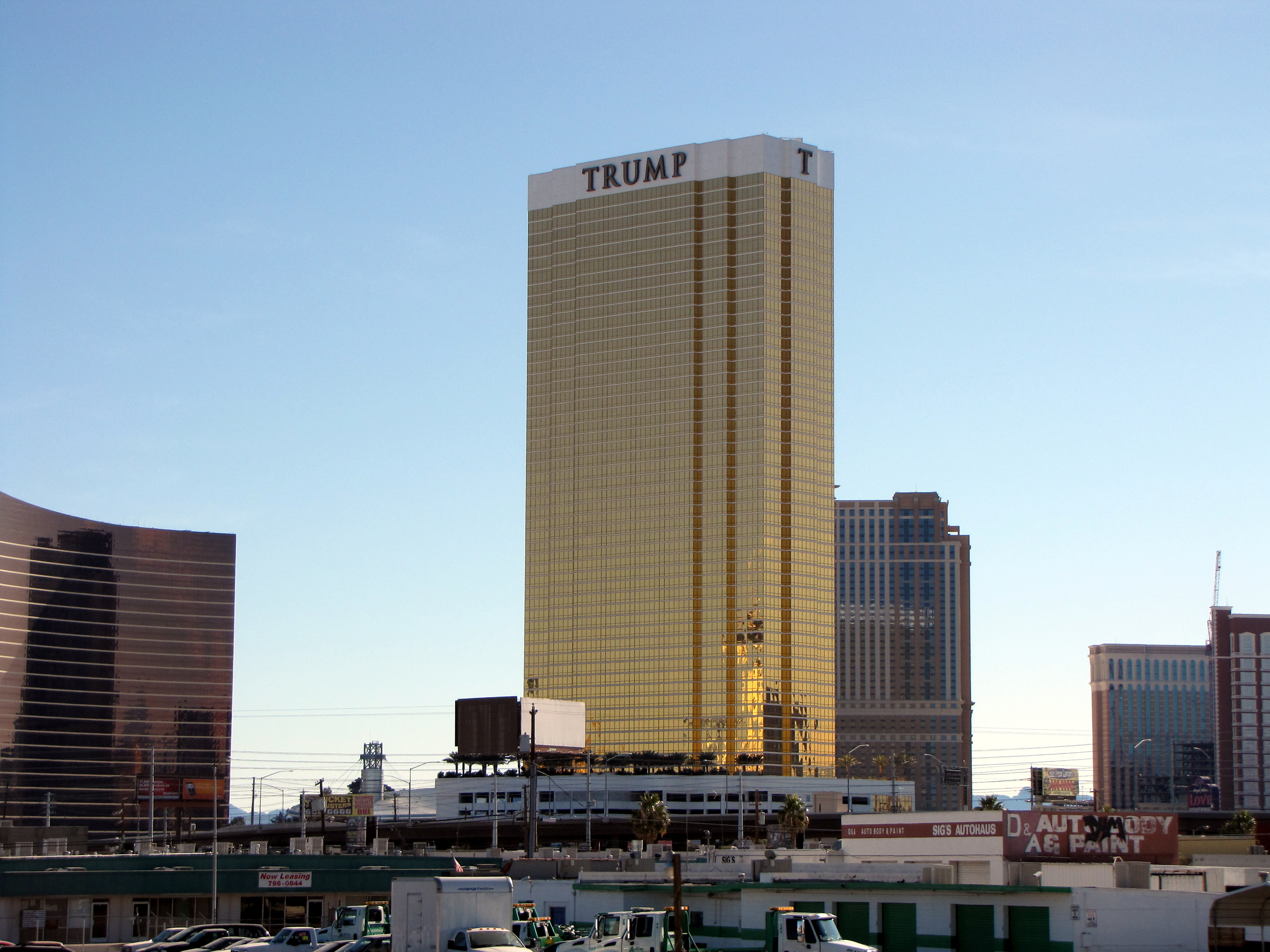
Trump Hotel in 2009

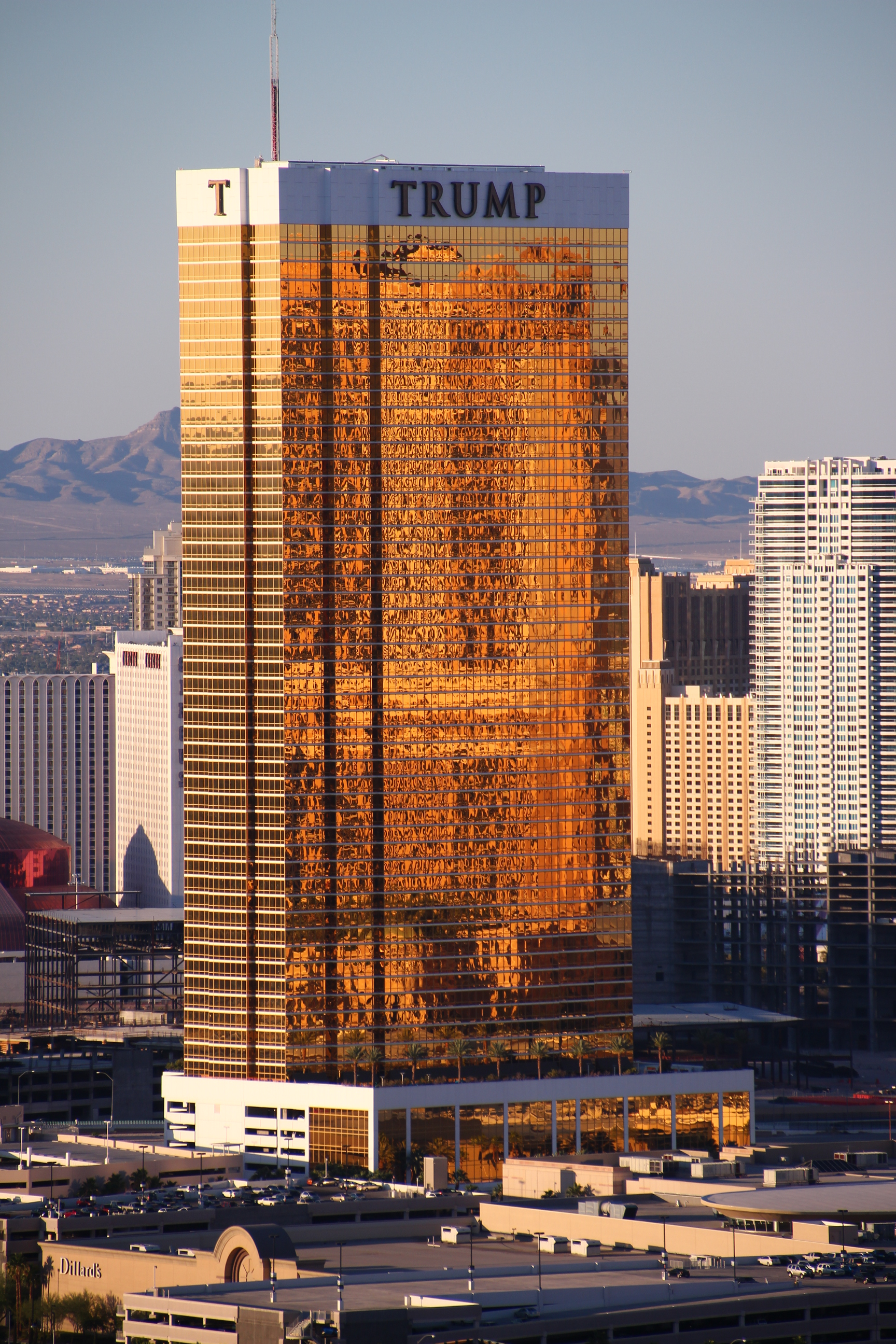
Trump Hotel in 2013

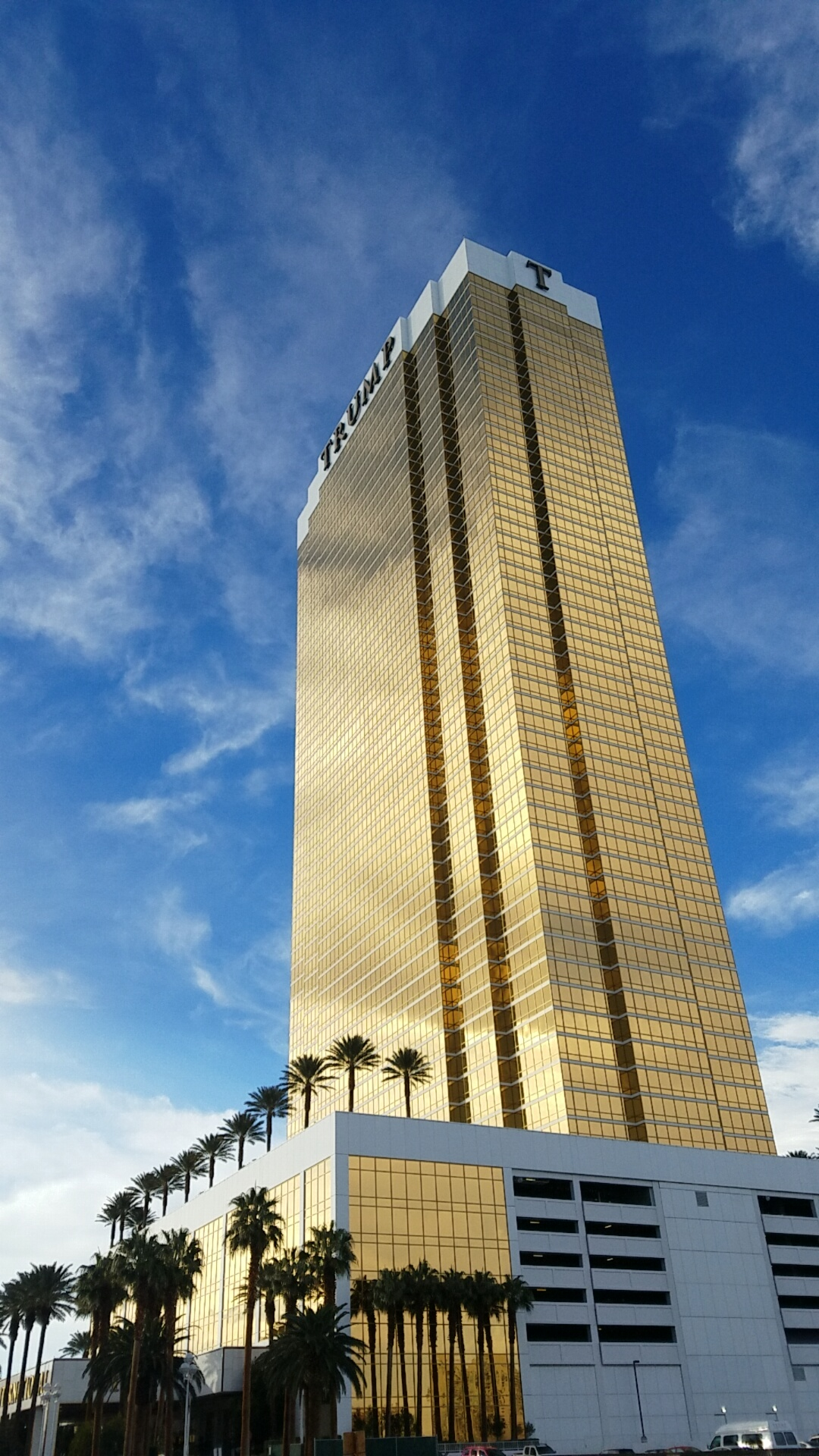
Trump Hotel in 2017

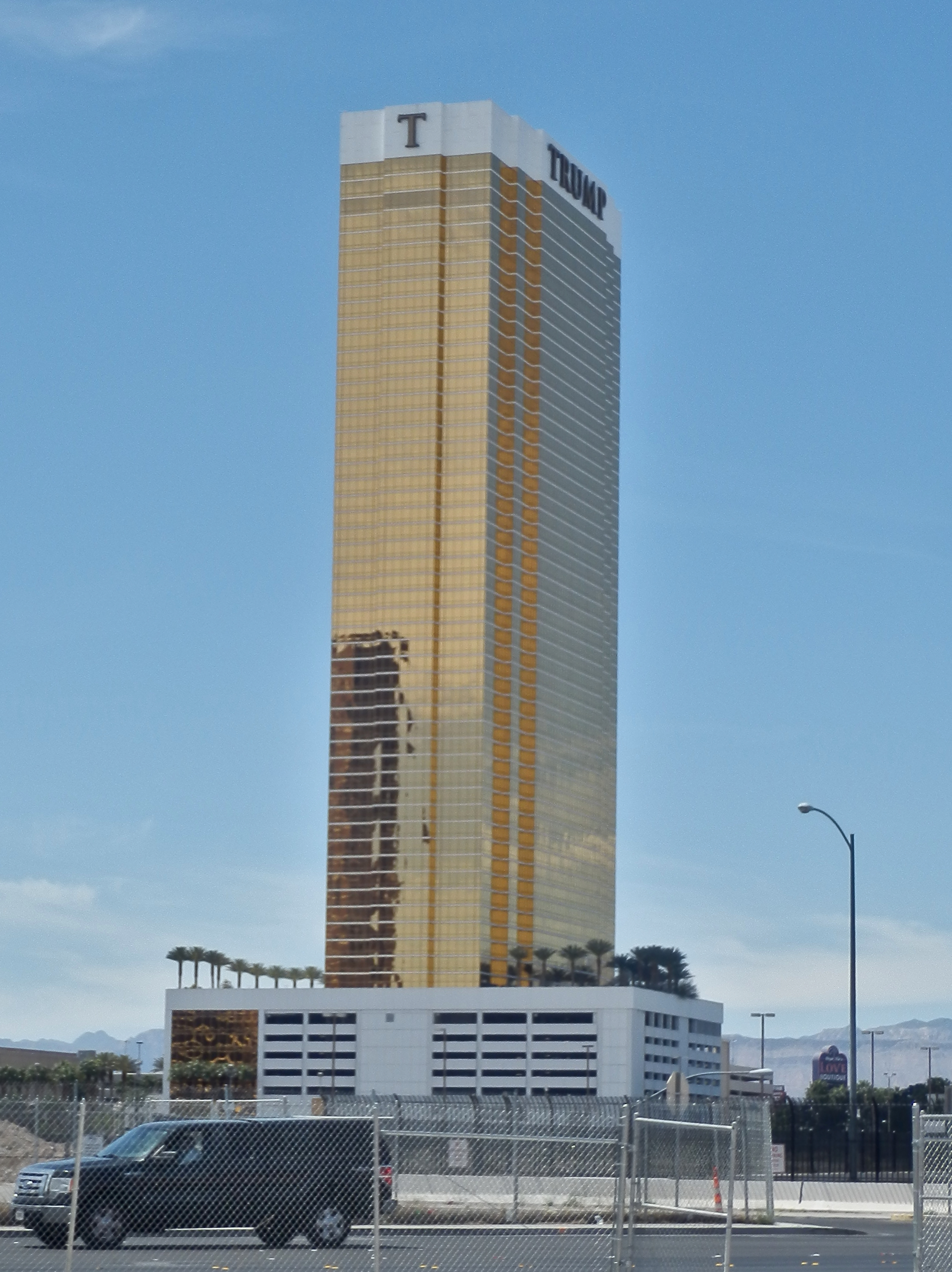
Trump Hotel in 2018

== See also ==
- List of tallest buildings in Las Vegas
- Wealth of Donald Trump
