= Aureole (restaurant) =

Defunct restaurant in New York City, U.S.

- Interactive map of Aureole

Restaurant information
- Established: 1988
- Closed: June 2020
- Head chef: Charlie Palmer
- Food type: American; New American
- Location: 135 West 42nd Street, New York City, New York, 10036, United States
- Coordinates: 40°45′20″N 73°59′7″W

Aureole was a restaurant created by Charlie Palmer in New York City and Las Vegas. The restaurant served American / New American cuisine. The NY restaurant closed in 2020 after operating for 32 years. The Las Vegas location was located at Mandalay Bay on the Las Vegas Strip from 1999 until its closure in February 2023.

== New York location ==
In 1988, Palmer opened Aureole in a townhouse on East 61st Street in NYC. In 2009, Palmer moved Aureole to One Bryant Park on the first floor of the Bank of America Tower.

== Las Vegas location ==
In 1999, Aureole opened at Mandalay Bay Resort on the Las Vegas Strip. The 9,000-square-foot (840 m^{2}) location featured a four-story, 10,000-bottle wine tower viewable from the walkway at the entrance of the restaurant. Upon selection of a bottle, a silver catsuit-clad Wine Angel straps herself into a pulley system and floats up the tower, selecting bottle and then descends — often with a twirl. The location would close in 2023.

== Awards and accolades ==
A 1991 The New York Times review wrote, “In today's economy, Aureole may be a place that is frequented only on special occasions. If you are lucky enough to go there, though, special it should be.”

The NY location was awarded one Michelin star by the Michelin Guide from 2006 until 2018.

The Las Vegas location was awarded one Michelin star by the Michelin Guide from 2008 until 2009

== See also ==
- List of Michelin-starred restaurants in Las Vegas
- List of Michelin-starred restaurants in New York City
- List of New American restaurants
