= Le Restaurant =

Coordinates: 52°21′20.17″N 4°53′53.59″E

- Interactive map of Le Restaurant

Restaurant information
- Closed: 2023
- Head chef: Jan de Wit
- Food type: French, Mediterranean, International
- Rating: Michelin Guide
- Location: Tweede Jan-Steenstraat 3, Amsterdam, 1073 VK, Netherlands
- Seating capacity: 20
- Website: Official website

Le Restaurant was a restaurant in Amsterdam, Netherlands. It was a fine dining restaurant that was awarded one Michelin star for the period 2010–2023.

GaultMillau awarded the restaurant 16 out of 20 points.

Head chef of Le Restaurant is owner Jan de Wit. Previously Graham Mee was also a head chef, but he left in 2016 to start his own restaurant.

Chef Patron Jan de Wit opened the restaurant in 2008.

On 3 December 2016 the restaurant closed its doors, due to problems with the tenancy contract. Jan de Wit announce at that time that he was looking for another location.

The restaurant closed on June 1, 2023.

== See also ==
- List of Michelin-starred restaurants in the Netherlands
