= Joël Robuchon =

French chef and restaurateur (1945–2018)

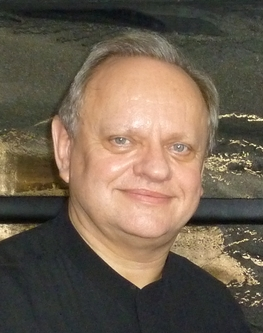
- Joël Robuchon, September 2010
- Born: 7 April 1945; Poitiers, France
- Died: 6 August 2018 (aged 73); Geneva, Switzerland
- Culinary career
- Rating(s): Michelin stars AAA Motor Club Mobil
- Current restaurant(s): Joël Robuchon (Las Vegas) L'Atelier de Joël Robuchon (Dubai, Gustavia, Hong Kong, Las Vegas, Macau (Robuchon Au Dome), Madrid, Miami, Monaco, Paris, Taipei, Tokyo, Singapore, Geneva and Shanghai) La Table de Joël Robuchon & Le Chateau de Joël Robuchon (Paris, Shanghai and Tokyo)
- Previous restaurant(s): Bangkok, Jamin, London, Montreal, New York City
- Television show(s): Cuisinez comme un grand chef (TF1, 1996–1999) Bon appetit, bien sûr (France 3, 2000)
- Award won: Officer of the Legion d'honneur
- Website: jrobuchon.com

Joël Robuchon (French pronunciation: [ʒɔɛl ʁɔbyʃɔ̃], 7 April 1945 – 6 August 2018) was a French chef and restaurateur. He was named "Chef of the Century" by the guide Gault Millau in 1989, and awarded the Meilleur Ouvrier de France (France's best worker) in cuisine in 1976. He published several cookbooks, two of which have been translated into English, chaired the committee for the Larousse Gastronomique, and hosted culinary television shows in France. He operated more than a dozen restaurants across Bangkok, Bordeaux, Hong Kong, Las Vegas, London, Macau, Madrid, Monaco, Montreal, Paris, Shanghai, Singapore, Taipei, Tokyo, and New York City. His restaurants have been acclaimed, and he held 31 Michelin Guide stars among them by the time of his death in 2018, the most any restaurateur has ever held. He is considered to be one of the greatest chefs of all time.

== Biography ==
Robuchon was born in 1945 in Poitiers, France, one of four children of a bricklayer. He attended the seminary in Châtillon-sur-Sèvre (now Mauléon), Deux-Sèvres, briefly considering a clerical career. However, he discovered his love of cooking while helping the nuns prepare food in the kitchen. In 1960, at the age of 15, he became an apprentice chef at the Relais de Poitiers hotel, starting as a pastry chef. While undergoing his apprenticeship, he won five competitive medals for cooking while under 20. He also went on his first trip to Japan with his mentor, the Michelin-starred chef Jean Delaveyne. He would, like his mentor, be a disciple of Japanese tradition and influence in his cooking throughout his career.

After he turned 21, he joined the apprenticeship Compagnon du Tour de France, enabling him to travel throughout the country, learning a variety of regional techniques. At the age of 29, Robuchon was appointed head chef at the Hôtel Concorde La Fayette, where he managed 90 cooks. In 1976 he won the Meilleur Ouvrier de France for his craftsmanship in culinary arts. While working as an Executive Chef and Food and Beverage manager of the Nikko hotel in Paris he gained two Michelin stars.

In 1981, he opened his own restaurant, Jamin, which holds the rare distinction of receiving three Michelin stars in the first three years of existence. 18 months after its opening, The New York Times described him as one of the "most creative young chefs in Paris" while reporting on his second Michelin star. In 1984, Jamin was named "Best Restaurant in the World" by the International Herald Tribune. Between 1987 and 1990, he became a regular of cooking shows on French television.

In 1989, the prestigious restaurant guide Gault Millau named Robuchon the "Chef of the Century". He mentored many famous chefs, including Gordon Ramsay, Eric Ripert, and Michael Caines.

In 1995, seeing many of his peers die of stress and heart attacks, Robuchon retired at the age of 50. He subsequently staged a comeback, opening several restaurants bearing his name around the world. He hosted Cuisinez comme un grand chef on TF1 from 1996 to 1999; in 2000, he hosted Bon appétit bien sûr on France 3. Through his various restaurants, including the newly awarded 3-star rating for his restaurant in Singapore, he accumulated a total of 31 Michelin Guide stars – the most of any chef in the world.

Robuchon was a Freemason of the Grande Loge Nationale Française, but he said it did not affect his career.

Robuchon died from cancer on 6 August 2018, a year after receiving treatment for a pancreatic tumour. He was 73.

== Personal life ==
Robuchon and his wife Jeanine Paulette Arlette Robuchon, a French woman whom he married in 1966, had two children, son Eric Robuchon, a pedicurist and podiatrist based in Paris, and daughter Sophie Kartheiser, who manages a restaurant named La Cour d'Eymet in Dordogne with her husband, chef François Kartheiser. He also has a son Louis Robuchon-Abe (born 1988) with a Japanese woman. Louis is a wine importer in Japan. Robuchon was survived by his wife, his three children and four grandchildren.

== Legacy ==
Robuchon has been the most influential French chef of the post-nouvelle cuisine era. Since the mid-1980s, he has been called the primus inter pares of Paris' three-star chefs for his work both at Jamin and at his eponymous restaurant.

Robuchon has been known for the relentless perfectionism of his cuisine; he said there is no such thing as the perfect meal – one can always do better. He was instrumental in leading French cuisine forward from the excessive reductionism of nouvelle cuisine toward a post-modern amalgam of the nouvelle, international influences – especially Japanese cuisine – and even select traditions of haute cuisine. In particular, his style of cooking was often seen as of celebrating the intrinsic qualities of the best, seasonal ingredients (dubbed "cuisine actuelle" by Patricia Wells in her book, Simply French). Drawing his inspiration firstly from the simplicity of Japanese cuisine, he led the way in creating a more delicate style respectful of natural food ingredients.

== Restaurants ==
Joël Robuchon restaurants are present worldwide:

Name	Michelin rating	Chef	Location	Region
L'Atelier de Joël Robuchon	2 Michelin stars	Julien Tongourian	Hong Kong	Asia
Le Jardin de Joël Robuchon	—	Julien Tongourian	Hong Kong	Asia
Salon de Thé de Joël Robuchon	—		Hong Kong	Asia
Robuchon au Dôme	3 Michelin stars	Julien Tongourian	Macau at the Grand Lisboa Hotel	Asia
L'Atelier de Joël Robuchon	2 Michelin stars	Yohei Matsuo	Taipei	Asia
Salon de Thé de Joël Robuchon	—	Yohei Matsuo	Taipei	Asia
Le Chateau de Joël Robuchon	3 Michelin stars	Kenichiro Sekiya	Tokyo in the Château of the Yebisu Garden Place	Asia
La Table de Joël Robuchon	—		Tokyo in the Château of the Yebisu Garden Place	Asia
Salon de Thé de Joël Robuchon	—		Tokyo in the Château of the Yebisu Garden Place	Asia
L'Atelier de Joël Robuchon	1 Michelin star		Tokyo in Roppongi Hills	Asia
L'Atelier de Joël Robuchon	—		Dubai	Middle East and Africa
Le Deli Robuchon	—		Dubai	Middle East and Africa
La Méditerranée Robuchon	—		Dubai	Middle East and Africa
Le Clubhouse Robuchon	—		Rabat	Middle East and Africa
Le Café Robuchon	—		Rabat	Middle East and Africa
Le Grill Robuchon	—		Rabat	Middle East and Africa
Le Deli Robuchon	—		Casablanca	Middle East and Africa
La Boulangerie Robuchon	—		Casablanca	Middle East and Africa
L'Atelier de Joël Robuchon	2 Michelin stars		Geneva	Europe
Le Deli Robuchon Piccadilly	—		London	Europe
Le Deli Robuchon King's Road	—		London	Europe
Le Deli Robuchon	—		Monaco	Europe
Le Café Robuchon	—		Monaco	Europe
L'Atelier de Joël Robuchon Étoile	1 Michelin star		Paris	Europe
L'Atelier de Joël Robuchon	2 Michelin stars		Paris	Europe
Robuchon Madrid	—		Madrid	Europe
Le Deli Robuchon	—		Cyprus	Europe
L'Atelier Robuchon	—		Cyprus	Europe
Joël Robuchon	2 Michelin stars	Eleazar Villanueva	Las Vegas	Americas
L'Atelier de Joël Robuchon	1 Michelin star	David Lee	Las Vegas	Americas
L'Atelier de Joël Robuchon	2 Michelin stars	James Friedberg	Miami	Americas
L'Atelier de Joël Robuchon	—		St Barths	Americas
Le Daily Robuchon	—		St Barths	Americas

Past locations: Bangkok, Singapore, Montreal, New York City.

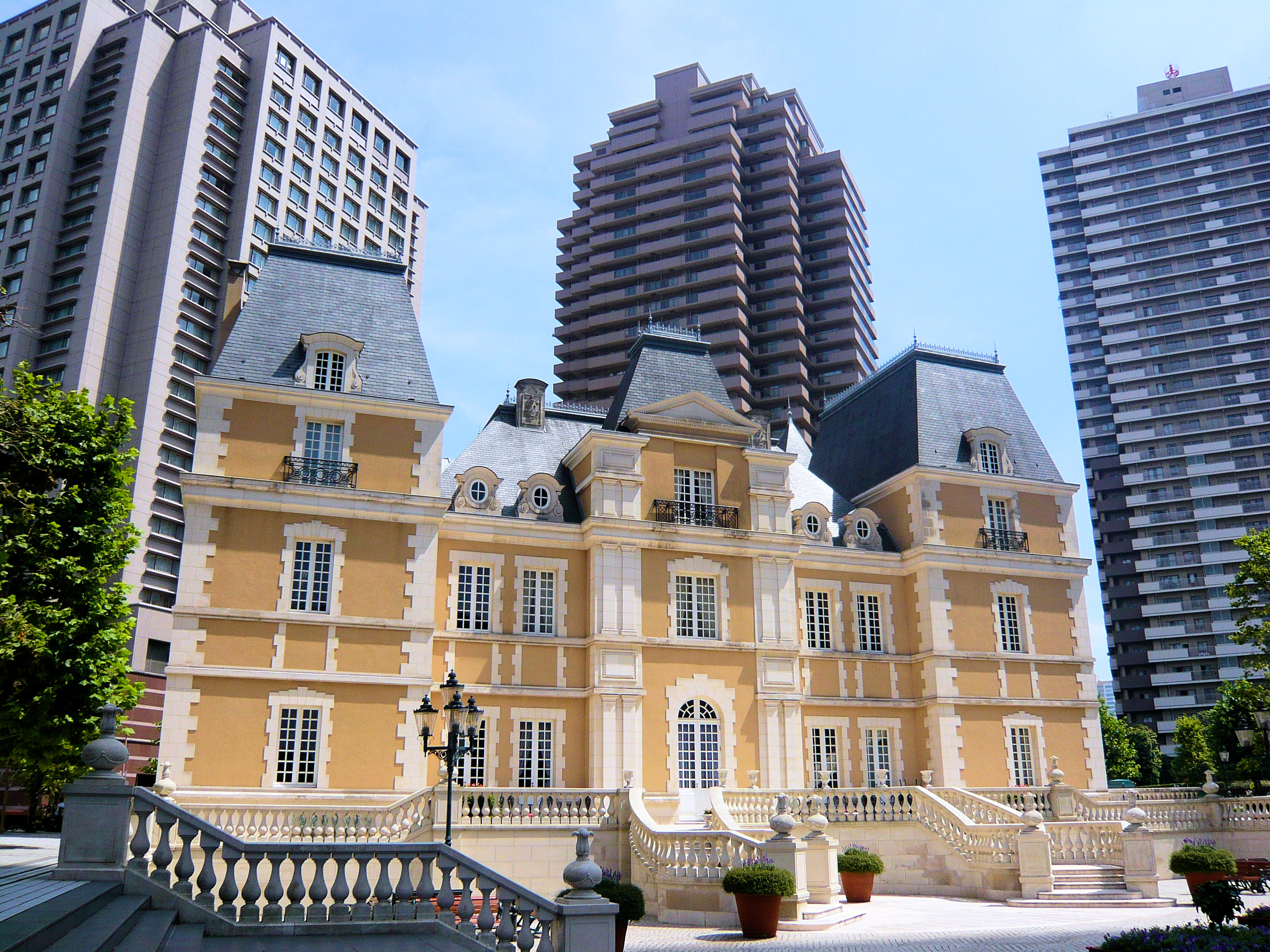
Robuchon's restaurants in Tokyo are located in the Château of the Yebisu Garden Place.

== Michelin-starred restaurants associated with Joël Robuchon and their highest rating ==
Key
1 Michelin star	One Michelin star
2 Michelin stars	Two Michelin stars
3 Michelin stars	Three Michelin stars

No.	Name	Country	Rating
1	Jamin (Paris)	France	3 Michelin stars
2	Le Pré Catalan (Paris)	France	3 Michelin stars
3	Joël Robuchon (Las Vegas)	United States	3 Michelin stars
4	Joël Robuchon (Tokyo)	Japan	3 Michelin stars
5	Joël Robuchon (Singapore)	Singapore	3 Michelin stars
6	Robuchon au Dôme (Macau)	Macau	3 Michelin stars
7	L'Atelier de Joël Robuchon (Hong Kong)	Hong Kong	3 Michelin stars
8	Nikko (Paris)	France	2 Michelin stars
9	La Table de Joël Robuchon (Paris)	France	2 Michelin stars
10	L'Atelier de Joël Robuchon (Étoile, Paris)	France	2 Michelin stars
11	L'Atelier de Joël Robuchon (St.-Germain, Paris)	France	2 Michelin stars
12	La Grande Maison de Joël Robuchon (Bordeaux)	France	2 Michelin stars
13	L'Atelier de Joël Robuchon (Miami)	United States	2 Michelin stars
14	L'Atelier de Joël Robuchon (New York City, 2006-12)	United States	2 Michelin stars
15	L'Atelier de Joël Robuchon (New York City, 2017-20)	United States	2 Michelin stars
16	L'Atelier de Joël Robuchon (Tokyo)	Japan	2 Michelin stars
17	La Table de Joël Robuchon (Tokyo)	Japan	2 Michelin stars
18	L'Atelier de Joël Robuchon (Singapore)	Singapore	2 Michelin stars
19	Joël Robuchon (Monte-Carlo)	Monaco	2 Michelin stars
20	L'Atelier de Joël Robuchon (Taiwan)	Taiwan	2 Michelin stars
21	L'Atelier de Joël Robuchon (London)	England	2 Michelin stars
22	L'Atelier de Joël Robuchon (Geneva)	Switzerland	2 Michelin stars
23	L'Atelier de Joël Robuchon (Shanghai)	China	2 Michelin stars
24	L'Atelier de Joël Robuchon (Las Vegas)	United States	1 Michelin star
25	Le Grill de Joël Robuchon (New York City)	United States	1 Michelin star
26	Yoshi (Monte-Carlo)	Monaco	1 Michelin star
27	Robuchon Monaco (Monte-Carlo)	Monaco	1 Michelin star
28	L'Atelier de Joël Robuchon (Bangkok)	Thailand	1 Michelin star
29	La Cuisine de Joël Robuchon (London)	England	1 Michelin star

== Awards ==
- Meilleur ouvrier de France, 1976
- Declared "Best Restaurant in the World" by International Herald Tribune, 1984
- Legion of Honour Knight in 1993; Officer in 2003
- Best French Restaurant, Best Chef in Las Vegas, Las Vegas Life International Epicurean Awards
- "Hot Tables", CondeNast Traveller
- Five-Star Award, 2006–2011 Forbes Travel Guide
- Best French Restaurant in Las Vegas, 2006–2010, Hotel Concierge Association.
- The Laurent Perrier 2009 Lifetime Achievement Award at The S. Pellegrino World's 50 Best Restaurants 2009

== Cookbooks ==
Robuchon has published numerous cookbooks in French and English, some of which are:

- Simply French: Patricia Wells Presents the Cuisine of Joel Robuchon
- Tout Robuchon (published as The Complete Robuchon in English)
- Joël Robuchon Cooking Through the Seasons
- La Cuisine de Joël Robuchon: A Seasonal Cookbook
- L'Atelier of Joël Robuchon: The Artistry of a Master Chef and His Protégés
- Le Grand Larousse Gastronomique
- Food and Life
- My Best: Joël Robuchon
- Grand Livre de Cuisine de Joël Robuchon
- French Regional Food
- Robuchon Facile
- Le Meilleur & Le Plus Simple de Robuchon: 130 recettes
- Le Meilleur & Le Plus Simple de la France: 130 recettes
- Le Meilleur & Le Plus Simple de la pomme de terre: 100 recettes
- Ma Cuisine Pour Vous
- Cuisine des Quatre Saisons
- Larousse Vegetables & Salads
- Emotions Gourmandes
- Les Dimanches de Joël Robuchon
- Il Grande Libro di Cucina di Joël Robuchon
- Best of Joel Robuchon
- Bon Appétit Bien Sûr: 150 recettes à faire à la maison

== See also ==
- List of Michelin 3-starred restaurants
- L'Atelier de Joël Robuchon
