= L'Atelier de Joël Robuchon =

Restaurant chain

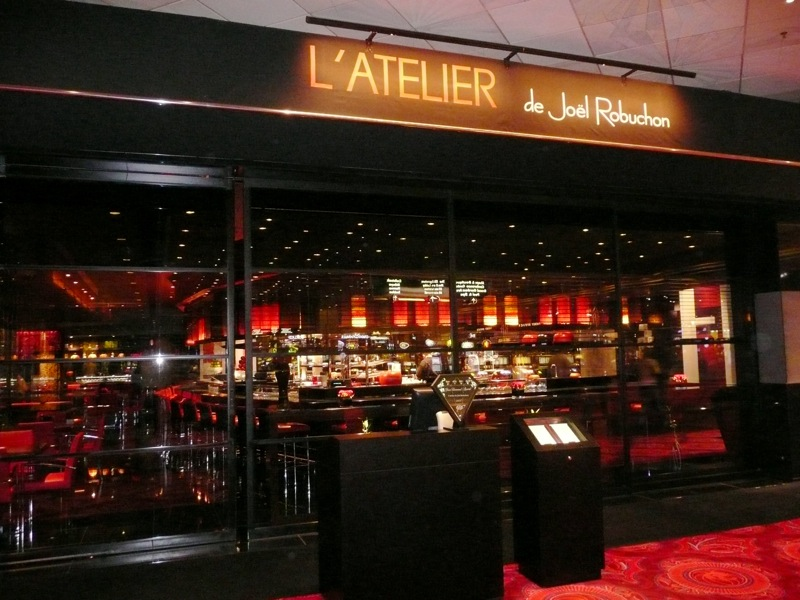
L'Atelier de Joël Robuchon in Las Vegas

L'Atelier de Joël Robuchon is the name of French gourmet restaurants, located worldwide, created by chef Joël Robuchon and managed by JR International. The restaurants serve French haute cuisine in a stylized environment. Many of the seats are arranged to overlook the meal preparation in the kitchen. L'Atelier translates to "workshop," and the term atelier is commonly used to refer to the workshop of an artist in the fine or decorative arts.

In 2012, the Paris location of L’Atelier de Joël Robuchon in Saint-Germain-des-Prés was voted 12th best in the world in Restaurant magazine's Top 50.

Notable chefs who have worked at the ateliers include Lebanese writer Tara Khattar and Christophe Bellanca.

== Locations ==
L'Atelier de Joël Robuchon is present worldwide:

Key
1 Michelin star	One Michelin star
2 Michelin stars	Two Michelin stars
3 Michelin stars	Three Michelin stars
—	The restaurant did not receive a star that year

No.	Name	Country	Current Michelin Rating	References
1	L'Atelier de Joël Robuchon (Dubai)	UAE	—	
2	L'Atelier de Joël Robuchon (Geneva)	Switzerland	2 Michelin stars	
3	L'Atelier de Joël Robuchon (Hong Kong)	Hong Kong	2 Michelin stars	
4	L'Atelier de Joël Robuchon (MGM Grand Las Vegas)	USA	1 Michelin star	
5	L'Atelier de Joël Robuchon (Miami)	USA	2 Michelin stars	
6	L'Atelier de Joël Robuchon (Taipei)	Taiwan	2 Michelin stars	
7	L'Atelier de Joël Robuchon (Tokyo)	Japan	1 Michelin star	
8	L'Atelier de Joël Robuchon (Étoile)	France	1 Michelin star	
9	L'Atelier de Joël Robuchon (St. Germain)	France	—	
10	L'Atelier de Joël Robuchon (St. Barth)	Saint Barthélemy	—	
11	L'Atelier de Joël Robuchon (Ayia Napa)	Cyprus	—	
12	Robuchon au Dôme (Macau)	Macau	3 Michelin stars	

=== Past locations ===
No.	Name	Country	Michelin Rating	References
1	L'Atelier de Joël Robuchon (Bangkok)	Thailand	1 Michelin star	
2	L'Atelier de Joël Robuchon (London)	England	1 Michelin star	
3	L'Atelier de Joël Robuchon (Monaco)	Monaco	—	
4	L'Atelier de Joël Robuchon (Montreal)	Canada	—	
5	L'Atelier de Joël Robuchon (New York City)	USA	2 Michelin stars	
6	L'Atelier de Joël Robuchon (Shanghai)	China	2 Michelin stars	
7	L'Atelier de Joël Robuchon (Singapore)	Singapore	2 Michelin stars	
7	L'Atelier de Joël Robuchon (Madrid)	Spain	—	

== See also ==
- Joël Robuchon restaurant
- List of Michelin-starred restaurants in the American Southwest
- List of restaurants in the Las Vegas Valley
