= Lists of Michelin-starred restaurants =

The list includes lists of Michelin-starred restaurants. A Michelin-starred restaurant is a restaurant that has been rated up to three stars for excellence to a select few restaurants in certain geographic areas.

== By location ==
=== Asia ===
==== Eastern Asia ====
- List of Michelin-starred restaurants in Japan
  - List of Michelin-starred restaurants in Hokkaido
  - List of Michelin-starred restaurants in Kyoto and Osaka
  - List of Michelin-starred restaurants in Nara
  - List of Michelin-starred restaurants in Tokyo
- List of Michelin-starred restaurants in South Korea
- List of Michelin-starred restaurants in Taiwan

===== China =====
- List of Michelin-starred restaurants in Beijing
- List of Michelin-starred restaurants in Chengdu
- List of Michelin-starred restaurants in Guangzhou
- List of Michelin-starred restaurants in Hangzhou
- List of Michelin-starred restaurants in Hong Kong & Macau
- List of Michelin-starred restaurants in Shanghai

==== Southeastern Asia ====
- List of Michelin-starred restaurants in Malaysia
- List of Michelin-starred restaurants in the Philippines
- List of Michelin-starred restaurants in Singapore
- List of Michelin-starred restaurants in Thailand
- List of Michelin-starred restaurants in Vietnam

==== Western Asia ====
- List of Michelin-starred restaurants in Abu Dhabi
- List of Michelin-starred restaurants in Doha
- List of Michelin-starred restaurants in Dubai
- List of Michelin-starred restaurants in Saudi Arabia
- List of Michelin-starred restaurants in Turkey

=== Europe ===
==== Eastern Europe ====
- List of Michelin-starred restaurants in the Czech Republic
- List of Michelin-starred restaurants in Hungary
- List of Michelin-starred restaurants in Moscow
- List of Michelin-starred restaurants in Poland

==== Northern Europe ====
===== Baltic region =====
- List of Michelin-starred restaurants in Estonia
- List of Michelin-starred restaurants in Latvia
- List of Michelin-starred restaurants in Lithuania

===== British Isles =====
- List of Michelin-starred restaurants in England
  - List of Michelin-starred restaurants in Greater London
- List of Michelin-starred restaurants in Ireland
- List of Michelin-starred restaurants in Northern Ireland
- List of Michelin-starred restaurants in Scotland
- List of Michelin-starred restaurants in Wales

===== Nordic region =====
- List of Michelin-starred restaurants in Denmark
- List of Michelin-starred restaurants in Finland
- List of Michelin-starred restaurants in Iceland
- List of Michelin-starred restaurants in Norway
- List of Michelin-starred restaurants in Sweden

==== Western Europe ====
- List of Michelin-starred restaurants in Austria
- List of Michelin-starred restaurants in Belgium & Luxembourg
- List of Michelin-starred restaurants in France
  - List of Michelin-starred restaurants in Paris
- List of Michelin-starred restaurants in Germany
- List of Michelin-starred restaurants in Monaco
- List of Michelin-starred restaurants in the Netherlands
- List of Michelin-starred restaurants in Switzerland

==== Southern Europe ====
- List of Michelin-starred restaurants in Croatia
- List of Michelin-starred restaurants in Greece
- List of Michelin-starred restaurants in Italy
- List of Michelin-starred restaurants in Malta
- List of Michelin-starred restaurants in Portugal
- List of Michelin-starred restaurants in Serbia
- List of Michelin-starred restaurants in Slovenia
- List of Michelin-starred restaurants in Spain

=== North America ===
- List of Michelin-starred restaurants in Mexico

==== Canada ====
- List of Michelin-starred restaurants in Quebec
- List of Michelin-starred restaurants in Toronto
- List of Michelin-starred restaurants in Vancouver

==== United States ====
- List of Michelin-starred restaurants in American Northeast Cities
  - List of Michelin-starred restaurants in Chicago
  - List of Michelin-starred restaurants in New York City
  - List of Michelin-starred restaurants in Washington, D.C.
- List of Michelin-starred restaurants in the American South
- List of Michelin-starred restaurants in the American Southwest
- List of Michelin-starred restaurants in California
- List of Michelin-starred restaurants in Colorado
- List of Michelin-starred restaurants in Florida
- List of Michelin-starred restaurants in Texas

=== Oceania ===
- List of Michelin-starred restaurants in New Zealand
- List of Michelin-starred restaurants in South Australia

=== South America ===
- List of Michelin-starred restaurants in Argentina
- List of Michelin-starred restaurants in Brazil

== By number of stars ==
- List of Michelin 3-star restaurants
  - List of Michelin 3-star restaurants in Hong Kong and Macau
  - List of Michelin 3-star restaurants in the United Kingdom
  - List of Michelin 3-star restaurants in the United States

== See also ==
- Michelin Guide
- Lists of restaurants
