= Lists of restaurants =

This is an index of restaurant-related lists. A restaurant is a business establishment which prepares and serves food and drink to customers in return for money, either paid before the meal, after the meal, or with a running tab. Meals are generally served and eaten on premises, but many restaurants also offer take-out and food delivery services. Restaurants vary greatly in appearance and offerings, including a wide variety of the main chef's cuisines and service models.

== By company ==
- List of countries with Burger King franchises
- List of countries with Jollibee outlets
- List of countries with KFC franchises
- List of countries with McDonald's restaurants
- List of countries with Subway restaurants
- List of countries with TGI Fridays franchises

== By country and city ==
=== Argentina ===
- List of Michelin-starred restaurants in Argentina

=== Australia ===
- List of Michelin Bib Gourmand restaurants in South Australia
- List of Michelin-starred restaurants in South Australia
- List of restaurants in Australia
- List of pizzerias in Australia

=== Austria ===
- List of Michelin-starred restaurants in Austria
- List of restaurants in Vienna

=== Belgium ===
- List of Michelin-starred restaurants in Belgium

=== Brazil ===
- List of Michelin-starred restaurants in Brazil

=== Canada ===
- List of Canadian restaurants
- List of Canadian restaurant chains
- List of Canadian pizza chains
- List of fast-food chains in Canada
- List of Michelin Bib Gourmand restaurants in Canada
- List of Michelin-starred restaurants in Quebec
- List of Michelin-starred restaurants in Toronto
- List of Michelin-starred restaurants in Vancouver
- List of restaurants in Vancouver

=== China ===
- List of restaurants in China
- List of Michelin 3-star restaurants in Hong Kong and Macau
- List of Michelin-starred restaurants in Beijing
- List of Michelin-starred restaurants in Chengdu
- List of Michelin-starred restaurants in Guangzhou
- List of Michelin-starred restaurants in Hangzhou
- List of Michelin-starred restaurants in Hong Kong & Macau
- List of restaurants in Hong Kong
- List of Michelin-starred restaurants in Shanghai

=== Croatia ===
- List of Michelin-starred restaurants in Croatia

=== Czech Republic ===
- List of Michelin-starred restaurants in the Czech Republic

=== Denmark ===
- List of Michelin-starred restaurants in Denmark

=== Estonia ===
- List of Michelin-starred restaurants in Estonia
- List of restaurants in Estonia

=== Finland ===
- List of Michelin-starred restaurants in Finland

=== France ===
- List of Michelin-starred restaurants in France
- List of Michelin-starred restaurants in Paris
- List of restaurants in Paris

=== Germany ===
- List of Michelin-starred restaurants in Germany
- List of restaurants in Germany

=== Greece ===
- List of Michelin-starred restaurants in Greece

=== Hungary ===
- List of Michelin-starred restaurants in Hungary
- List of restaurants in Hungary

=== Iceland ===
- List of Michelin-starred restaurants in Iceland
- List of restaurants in Iceland

=== India ===
- List of restaurant chains in India

=== Ireland ===
- List of Michelin-starred restaurants in Ireland
- List of restaurant chains in Ireland

=== Israel ===
- List of restaurants in Israel

=== Italy ===
- List of Michelin-starred restaurants in Italy

=== Japan ===
- List of Michelin-starred restaurants in Japan
- List of Michelin-starred restaurants in Hokkaido
- List of Michelin-starred restaurants in Kyoto and Osaka
- List of Michelin-starred restaurants in Nara
- List of Michelin-starred restaurants in Tokyo
- List of restaurants in Tokyo

=== Latvia ===
- List of Michelin-starred restaurants in Latvia

=== Lithuania ===
- List of Michelin-starred restaurants in Lithuania

=== Luxembourg ===
- List of Michelin-starred restaurants in Luxembourg

=== Malaysia ===
- List of Michelin Bib Gourmand restaurants in Malaysia
- List of Michelin-starred restaurants in Malaysia

=== Malta ===
- List of Michelin-starred restaurants in Malta

=== Mexico ===
- List of Michelin Bib Gourmand restaurants in Mexico
- List of Michelin-starred restaurants in Mexico
- List of restaurants in Mexico

=== Monaco ===
- List of Michelin-starred restaurants in Monaco

=== Netherlands ===
- List of Michelin-starred restaurants in the Netherlands
- List of restaurants in Amsterdam
- List of restaurants in Rotterdam

=== New Zealand ===
- List of Michelin-starred restaurants in New Zealand
- List of Michelin Bib Gourmand restaurants in New Zealand

=== Nigeria ===
- List of restaurants in Lagos

=== Norway ===
- List of Michelin-starred restaurants in Norway

=== Philippines ===
- List of Michelin Bib Gourmand restaurants in the Philippines
- List of Michelin-starred restaurants in the Philippines
- List of restaurant chains in the Philippines

=== Poland ===
- List of Michelin-starred restaurants in Poland
- List of restaurant chains in Poland

=== Portugal ===
- List of Michelin-starred restaurants in Portugal

=== Qatar ===
- List of Michelin-starred restaurants in Doha

=== Russia ===
- List of Michelin-starred restaurants in Moscow

=== Serbia ===
- List of Michelin-starred restaurants in Serbia

=== Singapore ===
- List of Michelin-starred restaurants in Singapore
- List of restaurants in Singapore

=== Slovenia ===
- List of Michelin-starred restaurants in Slovenia

=== South Korea ===
- List of Michelin-starred restaurants in South Korea
- List of oldest restaurants in South Korea

=== Spain ===
- List of Michelin-starred restaurants in Spain
- List of restaurants in Barcelona

=== Sweden ===
- List of Michelin-starred restaurants in Sweden
- List of restaurants in Sweden

=== Switzerland ===
- List of Michelin-starred restaurants in Switzerland
- List of restaurants in Switzerland

=== Taiwan ===
- List of Michelin-starred restaurants in Taiwan
- List of restaurants in Taiwan

=== Thailand ===
- List of Michelin-starred restaurants in Thailand
- List of Michelin Bib Gourmand restaurants in Thailand

=== Turkey ===
- List of Michelin-starred restaurants in Turkey
- List of restaurants in Istanbul

=== United Arab Emirates ===
- List of Michelin-starred restaurants in Abu Dhabi
- List of Michelin-starred restaurants in Dubai

=== United Kingdom ===
- List of Michelin 3-star restaurants in the United Kingdom
- List of Michelin-starred restaurants in England
- List of Michelin-starred restaurants in Greater London
- List of Michelin-starred restaurants in Northern Ireland
- List of Michelin-starred restaurants in Scotland
- List of Michelin-starred restaurants in Wales
- List of restaurants in London
- List of restaurants in Scotland
- List of restaurants in Wales

=== United States ===
- List of restaurant chains in the United States
- List of pizza chains of the United States
- List of Michelin 3-star restaurants in the United States
- List of Michelin Bib Gourmand restaurants in the United States
- List of restaurant districts and streets in the United States

(by state then city)

- List of Michelin-starred restaurants in American Northeast Cities
- List of Michelin-starred restaurants in the American South
- List of Michelin-starred restaurants in the American Southwest
- List of Michelin-starred restaurants in California
- List of Michelin-starred restaurants in Colorado
- List of restaurants in Denver, Colorado
- List of Michelin-starred restaurants in Florida
- List of restaurants in Miami, Florida
- List of restaurants in Tampa, Florida
- List of restaurants in Atlanta, Georgia
- List of restaurants in Hawaii
- List of Michelin-starred restaurants in Chicago, Illinois
- List of restaurants in New Orleans, Louisiana
- List of restaurants in Baltimore, Maryland
- List of restaurants in Boston, Massachusetts
- List of restaurants in Cambridge, Massachusetts
- List of restaurants in the Las Vegas Valley, Nevada
- List of restaurants in New Jersey
- List of restaurants in Albuquerque, New Mexico
- List of Michelin-starred restaurants in New York City
- List of restaurants in New York City
- List of pizzerias in New York City
- List of restaurants in Cincinnati, Ohio
- List of restaurants in Portland, Oregon
- List of restaurants in Philadelphia, Pennsylvania
- List of restaurants in Rhode Island
- List of Michelin-starred restaurants in Texas
- List of restaurants in Austin, Texas
- List of restaurants in Dallas, Texas
- List of restaurants in Fort Worth, Texas
- List of restaurants in Houston, Texas
- List of restaurants in Seattle, Washington
- List of Michelin-starred restaurants in Washington, D.C.
- List of restaurants in Huntington, West Virginia

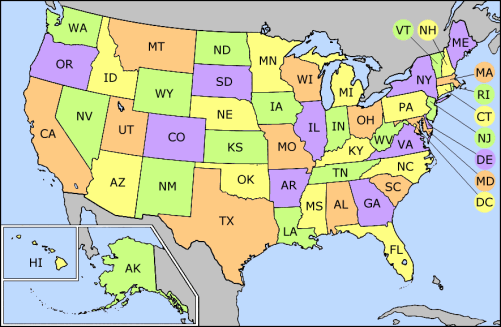

Restaurants originating in specific United States states. To locate any restaurants in a particular state, click on that state.

=== Vietnam ===
- List of Michelin-starred restaurants in Vietnam

== By food type ==
- List of barbecue restaurants
- List of chicken restaurants
- List of coffeehouse chains
- List of doughnut shops
- List of fish and chip restaurants
- List of frozen yogurt companies
- List of hamburger restaurants
- List of hot dog restaurants
- List of ice cream parlor chains
- List of noodle restaurants
  - List of ramen shops
- List of oyster bars
- List of pancake houses
- List of pizza chains
  - List of pizza franchises
- List of seafood restaurants
- List of steakhouses
- List of submarine sandwich restaurants
- List of sushi restaurants
- List of teahouses
- List of vegetarian and vegan restaurants

== By cuisine ==
- List of African restaurants
- List of Ashkenazi Jewish restaurants
- List of Basque restaurants
- List of British restaurants
- List of Cajun restaurants
- List of Cambodian restaurants
- List of Chinese restaurants
- List of Cuban restaurants
- List of Czech restaurants
- List of Filipino restaurants
- List of French restaurants
- List of German restaurants
- List of Greek restaurants
- List of Hawaiian restaurants
- List of Indian restaurants
- List of Indonesian restaurants
- List of Irish restaurants
- List of Italian restaurants
- List of Japanese restaurants
- List of Korean restaurants
- List of Lebanese restaurants
- List of Louisiana Creole restaurants
- List of Mexican restaurants
- List of Middle Eastern restaurants
- List of New American restaurants
- List of Pacific Northwest restaurants
- List of Peruvian restaurants
- List of Russian restaurants
- List of Scandinavian restaurants
- List of soul food restaurants
- List of Southern restaurants
- List of Spanish restaurants
- List of Tex-Mex restaurants
- List of Thai restaurants
- List of Turkish restaurants
- List of Ukrainian restaurants
- List of Vietnamese restaurants

== By ownership ==
- List of Black-owned restaurants
- List of restaurants owned or operated by Gordon Ramsay

== By rating ==
- List of Michelin 3-star restaurants
  - List of Michelin 3-star restaurants in Hong Kong and Macau
  - List of Michelin 3-star restaurants in the United Kingdom
  - List of Michelin 3-star restaurants in the United States
- List of Michelin-starred restaurants in Abu Dhabi
- List of Michelin-starred restaurants in American Northeast Cities
- List of Michelin-starred restaurants in the American South
- List of Michelin-starred restaurants in the American Southwest
- List of Michelin-starred restaurants in Argentina
- List of Michelin-starred restaurants in Austria
- List of Michelin-starred restaurants in Beijing
- List of Michelin-starred restaurants in Belgium & Luxembourg
- List of Michelin-starred restaurants in Brazil
- List of Michelin-starred restaurants in California
- List of Michelin-starred restaurants in Chengdu
- List of Michelin-starred restaurants in Chicago
- List of Michelin-starred restaurants in Colorado
- List of Michelin-starred restaurants in Croatia
- List of Michelin-starred restaurants in the Czech Republic
- List of Michelin-starred restaurants in Denmark
- List of Michelin-starred restaurants in Doha
- List of Michelin-starred restaurants in Dubai
- List of Michelin-starred restaurants in England
- List of Michelin-starred restaurants in Estonia
- List of Michelin-starred restaurants in Finland
- List of Michelin-starred restaurants in Florida
- List of Michelin-starred restaurants in France
- List of Michelin-starred restaurants in Germany
- List of Michelin-starred restaurants in Greece
- List of Michelin-starred restaurants in Guangzhou
- List of Michelin-starred restaurants in Hokkaido
- List of Michelin-starred restaurants in Hong Kong and Macau
- List of Michelin-starred restaurants in Hungary
- List of Michelin-starred restaurants in Iceland
- List of Michelin-starred restaurants in Ireland
- List of Michelin-starred restaurants in Italy
- List of Michelin-starred restaurants in Japan
- List of Michelin-starred restaurants in Greater London
- List of Michelin-starred restaurants in Kyoto and Osaka
- List of Michelin-starred restaurants in Malaysia
- List of Michelin-starred restaurants in Malta
- List of Michelin-starred restaurants in Mexico
- List of Michelin-starred restaurants in Monaco
- List of Michelin-starred restaurants in Moscow
- List of Michelin-starred restaurants in Nara
- List of Michelin-starred restaurants in the Netherlands
- List of Michelin-starred restaurants in New York City
- List of Michelin-starred restaurants in New Zealand
- List of Michelin-starred restaurants in Northern Ireland
- List of Michelin-starred restaurants in Norway
- List of Michelin-starred restaurants in Paris
- List of Michelin-starred restaurants in the Philippines
- List of Michelin-starred restaurants in Poland
- List of Michelin-starred restaurants in Portugal
- List of Michelin-starred restaurants in Quebec
- List of Michelin-starred restaurants in Scotland
- List of Michelin-starred restaurants in Serbia
- List of Michelin-starred restaurants in Shanghai
- List of Michelin-starred restaurants in Singapore
- List of Michelin-starred restaurants in Slovenia
- List of Michelin-starred restaurants in South Australia
- List of Michelin-starred restaurants in South Korea
- List of Michelin-starred restaurants in Spain
- List of Michelin-starred restaurants in Sweden
- List of Michelin-starred restaurants in Switzerland
- List of Michelin-starred restaurants in Taiwan
- List of Michelin-starred restaurants in Texas
- List of Michelin-starred restaurants in Thailand
- List of Michelin-starred restaurants in Tokyo
- List of Michelin-starred restaurants in Toronto
- List of Michelin-starred restaurants in Turkey
- List of Michelin-starred restaurants in Vancouver
- List of Michelin-starred restaurants in Vietnam
- List of Michelin-starred restaurants in Wales
- List of Michelin-starred restaurants in Washington, D.C.
- List of Michelin Bib Gourmand restaurants in Canada
- List of Michelin Bib Gourmand restaurants in Malaysia
- List of Michelin Bib Gourmand restaurants in Mexico
- List of Michelin Bib Gourmand restaurants in New Zealand
- List of Michelin Bib Gourmand restaurants in the Philippines
- List of Michelin Bib Gourmand restaurants in South Australia
- List of Michelin Bib Gourmand restaurants in Thailand
- List of Michelin Bib Gourmand restaurants in the United States
- Canada's 100 Best Restaurants
- La Liste
- The World's 50 Best Restaurants

== By type ==
- List of bakeries
- List of biker bars
- List of buffet restaurants
- List of cafeterias
- List of delicatessens
- List of diners
- List of dinner theaters
- List of drive-in restaurants
- List of floating restaurants
- List of Jewish delis
- List of kosher restaurants
- List of largest restaurants
- List of restaurant chains
  - List of casual dining restaurant chains
  - List of fast food restaurant chains
  - List of the largest fast food restaurant chains
  - List of defunct fast-food restaurant chains
- List of revolving restaurants
- List of supper clubs
- List of theme restaurants

== See also ==
- Cosplay restaurant
- List of restaurant districts and streets
- Lists of companies (category)
