= List of Michelin Bib Gourmand restaurants in South Australia =

As of the 2027 Michelin Guide, a total of 16 restaurants in South Australia have a Michelin Bib Gourmand recognition.

The Michelin Guides have been published by the French tire company Michelin since 1900. They were designed as a guide to tell drivers about eateries they recommended to visit and to subtly sponsor their tires, by encouraging drivers to use their cars more and therefore need to replace the tires as they wore out. The Michelin Bib Gourmand designation debuted internationally in 1997 and highlights restaurants offering "exceptionally good food at moderate prices". They must offer menu items priced below a maximum determined by local economic standards.

Per Michelin's own rating system, the Bib Gourmand is considered "Not quite a star, but most definitely not a consolation prize" and a "just-as-esteemed rating." As with Michelin stars, restaurants can also lose their Bib Gourmand designation. Bib Gourmand restaurants are assessed often by Michelin's inspectors, and must meet the required standards to remain on the list.

Michelin announced its intention to produce a guide for South Australia in May 2026, with the inaugural list debuting in October of the same year as the 2027 edition. The guide is Michelin's first in Australia, and second overall in Oceania after debuting in New Zealand earlier that year.

== List ==
Key
✅	Indicates a restaurant with a Michelin Bib Gourmand designation

Name	Cuisine	Location	2027
Africola	South African	Adelaide	✅
Antidote	Australian	Clare	✅
Bar Torino	Italian	Adelaide	✅
Bistro Francais	French	Adelaide	✅
Fino Seppeltsfield	Australian	Seppeltsfield	✅
Golden Boy	Thai	Adelaide	✅
Gondola Gondola	Thai / Vietnamese	Adelaide	✅
La Popular Taqueria	Mexican	Adelaide	✅
Noi	Vietnamese	Adelaide	✅
Pantry on Prospect	Australian	Adelaide	✅
Part Time Lover	Australian	Adelaide	✅
Parwana	Afghan	Adelaide	✅
Stamps	Australian	Adelaide	✅
Sunny's Pizza	Italian	Adelaide	✅
The Salopian Inn	Australian	McLaren Vale	✅
Tirage	Australian	Kingscote	✅
Reference(s)			

== See also ==
- List of Michelin-starred restaurants in South Australia
- List of Michelin Bib Gourmand restaurants in New Zealand
