= List of Michelin-starred restaurants in Serbia =

As of the 2026 Michelin Guide, there are two restaurants in Serbia with a Michelin-star rating. The Michelin Guides have been published by the French tyre company Michelin since 1900. They were created to provide drivers with all the necessary information for travelling, including recommended eateries. In the 1920s, Michelin began sending undercover inspectors to restaurants and awarding Michelin stars to the best-rated ones. Over time, Michelin stars became the most prestigious award restaurants can achieve.

Before stars are given, restaurants are visited multiple times by different anonymous Michelin Inspectors. They rate the restaurants' food on five criteria: the quality of ingredients, mastery of flavour and cooking techniques, the personality of the chef represented in the dining experience, balance and harmony of the flavours, and consistency between visits. Inspectors have at least ten years of experience. (Note: In 2008, The Guardian wrote that five years of experience were necessary.) They create a list of popular restaurants supported by media reports, reviews, and diner popularity, for inspection. If the Michelin Inspectors reach a consensus, Michelin awards the restaurant between one and three stars. One star means "high-quality cooking, worth a stop", two stars signify "excellent cooking, worth a detour", and three stars denote "exceptional cuisine, worth a special journey". The stars are not permanent and restaurants are continuously re-evaluated. If the criteria are not met, the restaurant loses one or more of its stars. (Note: According to The Guardian, Pascal Rémy, a former Inspector, stated that although each restaurant in the Guide is meant to be inspected every 18 months, they are often only revisited every three and a half years.)

The inaugural edition of the Michelin Guide for Serbia was launched in 2021. Michelin Stars were first awarded in the 2025 edition with two restaurants receiving one star each. The guide's scope was narrowed for the 2026 edition to solely cover Serbia's capital and largest city, Belgrade.

== List ==
Key
1 Michelin star	One Michelin star

Michelin-starred restaurants
Name	Cuisine	Location	2025	2026
Fleur de Sel	Modern	Novi Slankamen	1 Michelin star	1 Michelin star
Langouste	Modern	Belgrade	1 Michelin star	1 Michelin star
Reference				

== See also ==
- Lists of restaurants
- Lists of Michelin-starred restaurants
