= List of Michelin-starred restaurants in Malta =

In the 2026 Michelin Guide, there are seven restaurants in Malta with a Michelin-star rating. The Michelin Guides have been published by the French tyre company Michelin since 1900. They were created to provide drivers with all the necessary information for travelling, including recommended eateries. In the 1920s, Michelin began sending undercover inspectors to restaurants and awarding Michelin stars to the best-rated ones. Over time, Michelin stars became the most prestigious award restaurants can achieve.

Before stars are given, restaurants are visited multiple times by different anonymous Michelin Inspectors. They rate the restaurants' food on five criteria: the quality of ingredients, mastery of flavour and cooking techniques, the personality of the chef represented in the dining experience, balance and harmony of the flavours, and consistency between visits. Inspectors have at least ten years of experience. (Note: In 2008, The Guardian wrote that five years of experience were necessary.) They create a list of popular restaurants supported by media reports, reviews, and diner popularity, for inspection. If the Michelin Inspectors reach a consensus, Michelin awards the restaurant between one and three stars. One star means "high-quality cooking, worth a stop", two stars signify "excellent cooking, worth a detour", and three stars denote "exceptional cuisine, worth a special journey". The stars are not permanent and restaurants are continuously re-evaluated. If the criteria are not met, the restaurant loses one or more of its stars. (Note: According to The Guardian, Pascal Rémy, a former Inspector, stated that although each restaurant in the Guide is meant to be inspected every 18 months, they are often only revisited every three and a half years.)

Michelin Guide Malta launched in 2020 with funding from the Malta Tourism Authority (MTA). The MTA signed a five-year agreement with Michelin in 2019 to commission them to review the island of Malta. Every year since 2023, each Michelin-starred restaurant in the nation has sent a chef, who prepares a single dish, to Dine with the Stars, which is a charitable event raising money for the Malta Community Chest Fund.

== List ==
Key
1 Michelin star	One Michelin star
2 Michelin stars	Two Michelin stars
—	The restaurant did not receive a star that year

Michelin-starred restaurants
Name	Cuisine	Location	2020	2021	2022	2023	2024	2025	2026
Bahia	Contemporary	Balzan	—	1 Michelin star	1 Michelin star	1 Michelin star	1 Michelin star	—	—
De Mondion	Modern	Mdina	1 Michelin star	1 Michelin star	1 Michelin star	1 Michelin star	1 Michelin star	1 Michelin star	1 Michelin star
Fernandõ Gastrotheque	Mediterranean	Sliema	—	—	—	1 Michelin star	1 Michelin star	1 Michelin star	1 Michelin star
ION Harbour	Contemporary	Valletta	—	1 Michelin star	1 Michelin star	1 Michelin star	2 Michelin stars	2 Michelin stars	2 Michelin stars
Le GV	Modern	Sliema	—	—	—	—	—	1 Michelin star	1 Michelin star
Noni	Modern	Valletta	1 Michelin star	1 Michelin star	1 Michelin star	1 Michelin star	1 Michelin star	1 Michelin star	1 Michelin star
Rosamì	Creative	St. Julian's	—	—	—	—	1 Michelin star	1 Michelin star	1 Michelin star
Under Grain	Modern	Valletta	1 Michelin star	1 Michelin star	1 Michelin star	1 Michelin star	1 Michelin star	1 Michelin star	1 Michelin star
Reference									

== See also ==
- Lists of Michelin-starred restaurants
- Lists of restaurants
