= List of Michelin-starred restaurants in South Australia =

As of the 2027 guide, there are 11 restaurants in South Australia with a Michelin-star rating.

The Michelin Guides have been published by the French tire company Michelin since 1900. They were designed as a guide to tell drivers about eateries they recommended to visit and to subtly sponsor their tires, by encouraging drivers to use their cars more and therefore need to replace the tires as they wore out. Over time, the stars that were given out became more valuable.

Multiple anonymous Michelin inspectors visit the restaurants several times. They rate the restaurants on five criteria: "quality of products", "mastery of flavor and cooking techniques", "the personality of the chef represented in the dining experience", "value for money", and "consistency between inspectors' visits". Inspectors have at least ten years of expertise and create a list of popular restaurants supported by media reports, reviews, and diner popularity. If they reach a consensus, Michelin awards restaurants from one to three stars based on its evaluation methodology: One star means "high-quality cooking, worth a stop", two stars signify "excellent cooking, worth a detour", and three stars denote "exceptional cuisine, worth a special journey". The stars are not permanent and restaurants are constantly being re-evaluated. If the criteria are not met, the restaurant loses one or more of its stars.

In 2026, the Michelin Guide launched its first expansion into Oceania by launching the New Zealand guide. Michelin and Tourism Australia attempted to come to a deal but were unable to meet an agreement at the time. Michelin was asking for $4 million AUD with increases for the next two years. Since then Michelin and the South Australian government have come to an agreement with undisclosed fees to bring the guide to South Australia in October 2026.

== List ==
Key
1 Michelin star	One Michelin star
2 Michelin stars	Two Michelin stars

Michelin-starred restaurants
Name	Cuisine	Location	2027
Anvers Restaurant	Australian Contemporary	Kangarilla	1 Michelin star
Aptos	Australian Contemporary	Stirling	1 Michelin star
arkhé	Farm to table	Norwood	1 Michelin star
Aurora at ILA	Australian Contemporary	Adelaide	1 Michelin star
Botanic	Australian Contemporary	Adelaide	1 Michelin star
Esmay	Seasonal	Hackney	1 Michelin star
Hentley Farm	Seasonal	Seppeltsfield	1 Michelin star
LVN Restaurant at Bird in Hand	Australian Contemporary	Woodside	1 Michelin star
Magill Estate Restaurant	Australian Contemporary	Adelaide	2 Michelin stars
Maxwell Restaurant	Creative	McLaren Vale	1 Michelin star
Skillogalee Barrel House	Australian Contemporary	Sevenhill	1 Michelin star
References			

== See also ==
- List of Michelin Bib Gourmand restaurants in South Australia
- Lists of restaurants
