= List of Czech restaurants =

Following is a list of Czech restaurants:

- Bohemian Cafe, Omaha, Nebraska
- Czech Stop and Little Czech Bakery, West, Texas
- La Degustation, Prague, Czech Republic
- Swoboda Bakery, Omaha, Nebraska
- Vltava, Helsinki, Finland
