= List of Michelin-starred restaurants in the Czech Republic =

As of the 2026 guide, there are 13 restaurants in the Czech Republic with a Michelin-star rating.

The Michelin Guide reviews restaurants across the country, which is jointly funded with support from the Government of the Czech Republic. Until 2024, only restaurants in the Czech Republic's capital and largest city Prague were reviewed.

== Lists ==
=== Czech Republic (2025-2026) ===
Key
1 Michelin star	One Michelin star
2 Michelin stars	Two Michelin stars
—	The restaurant did not receive a star that year

Michelin-starred restaurants
Name	Cuisine	Location	2025	2026
Casa de Carli	Italian	Prague	1 Michelin star	1 Michelin star
Entrée	Modern	Olomouc	1 Michelin star	1 Michelin star
ESSENS	Czech	Hlohovec	1 Michelin star	1 Michelin star
Field	Modern	Prague	1 Michelin star	1 Michelin star
La Degustation Bohême Bourgeoise	Modern	Prague	1 Michelin star	1 Michelin star
La Villa	French	Zlín	1 Michelin star	1 Michelin star
Levitate	Asian Fusion	Prague	1 Michelin star	1 Michelin star
Reason	Czech	Prague	—	1 Michelin star
Salabka	Modern	Prague	—	1 Michelin star
Štangl	Czech	Prague	1 Michelin star	1 Michelin star
Papilio	Creative	Vysoký Újezd	2 Michelin stars	2 Michelin stars
Taro	Vietnamese	Prague	—	1 Michelin star
Zlata Praha	Modern	Prague	—	1 Michelin star
Reference(s)				

=== Prague (2013–2024) ===
==== 2021–2024 ====
Key
1 Michelin star	One Michelin star

Michelin-starred restaurants
Name	Cuisine	Location	2021	2022	2023	2024
Field	Contemporary	Prague 1	1 Michelin star	1 Michelin star	1 Michelin star	1 Michelin star
La Degustation Bohême Bourgeoise	Contemporary	Prague 1	1 Michelin star	1 Michelin star	1 Michelin star	1 Michelin star
Reference						

==== 2013–2020 lists ====
Key
1 Michelin star	One Michelin star
—	The restaurant did not receive a star that year

Michelin-starred restaurants
Name	Cuisine	Location	2013	2014	2015	2016	2017	2018	2019	2020
Alcron	Contemporary	Prague 1	1 Michelin star	1 Michelin star	1 Michelin star	1 Michelin star	1 Michelin star	—	—	—
Field	Contemporary	Prague 1	—	—	—	1 Michelin star	1 Michelin star	1 Michelin star	1 Michelin star	1 Michelin star
La Degustation Bohême Bourgeoise	Contemporary	Prague 1	1 Michelin star	1 Michelin star	1 Michelin star	1 Michelin star	1 Michelin star	1 Michelin star	1 Michelin star	1 Michelin star
Reference										

== See also ==
- Lists of restaurants

== Bibliography ==
- Michelin Guide Main Cities of Europe 2013. Michelin. 2013. ISBN 978-2-06-718069-7.
- Michelin Guide Main Cities of Europe 2014. Michelin. 2014. ISBN 978-2-06-718904-1.
- Michelin Guide Main Cities of Europe 2015. Michelin. 2015. ISBN 978-2-06-719701-5.
- Michelin Guide Main Cities of Europe 2016. Michelin. 2016. ISBN 978-2-06-720638-0.
