= List of Michelin-starred restaurants in Poland =

As of the 2026 Michelin Guide, there are 11 restaurants in Poland with a Michelin-star rating.

The Michelin Guides have been published by the French tire company Michelin since 1900. They were designed as a guide to tell drivers about eateries they recommended to visit and to subtly sponsor their tires, by encouraging drivers to use their cars more and therefore need to replace the tires as they wore out. Over time, the stars that were given out became more valuable.

Multiple anonymous Michelin inspectors visit the restaurants several times. They rate the restaurants on five criteria: "quality of products", "mastery of flavor and cooking techniques", "the personality of the chef represented in the dining experience", "value for money", and "consistency between inspectors' visits". Inspectors have at least ten years of expertise and create a list of popular restaurants supported by media reports, reviews, and diner popularity. If they reach a consensus, Michelin awards restaurants from one to three stars based on its evaluation methodology: one star means "high-quality cooking, worth a stop", two stars signify "excellent cooking, worth a detour", and three stars denote "exceptional cuisine, worth a special journey". The stars are not permanent and restaurants are constantly re-evaluated. If the criteria are not met, the restaurant will lose its stars.

The Michelin Guide originally started reviewing restaurants in Warsaw in 1997, and Kraków in 2008, as part of its Main Cities in Europe guide, with the rest of Poland then being added in 2023 for the first year of the nation's own guide. The first Michelin star to be awarded in Poland was to ateller Amaro in the 2013 guide.

== 2021–2026 list ==
Key
1 Michelin star	One Michelin star
2 Michelin stars	Two Michelin stars
—	The restaurant did not receive a star that year

Michelin-starred restaurants
Name	Cuisine	Location	2021	2022	2023	2024	2025	2026
Alon Omakase	Japanese	Warsaw – Mokotów	—	—	—	—	—	1 Michelin star
Arco by Paco Pérez	Spanish	Gdańsk	—	—	—	1 Michelin star	1 Michelin star	1 Michelin star
Baba	Polish	Wrocław	—	—	—	—	—	1 Michelin star
Bottiglieria 1881	Contemporary	Kraków	1 Michelin star	1 Michelin star	2 Michelin stars	2 Michelin stars	2 Michelin stars	2 Michelin stars
Giewont	Polish	Kościelisko	—	—	—	1 Michelin star	1 Michelin star	1 Michelin star
hub.praga	Modern	Warsaw – Praga-Północ	—	—	—	—	1 Michelin star	1 Michelin star
Most	Modern	Wrocław	—	—	—	—	—	1 Michelin star
Muga	Modern	Poznań	—	—	1 Michelin star	1 Michelin star	1 Michelin star	1 Michelin star
Nuta	Creative	Warsaw – Śródmieście	—	—	1 Michelin star	1 Michelin star	1 Michelin star	1 Michelin star
Rozbrat 20	Modern	Warsaw – Śródmieście	—	—	—	1 Michelin star	1 Michelin star	1 Michelin star
Steampunk	Modern	Pszczyna	—	—	—	—	—	1 Michelin star
Reference								

== 2013–2020 list ==
Key
1 Michelin star	One Michelin star
—	The restaurant did not receive a star that year

Michelin-starred restaurants
Name	Cuisine	Location	2013	2014	2015	2016	2017	2018	2019	2020
ateller Amaro	Modern	Warsaw	1 Michelin star	1 Michelin star	1 Michelin star	1 Michelin star	1 Michelin star	1 Michelin star	1 Michelin star	1 Michelin star
Bottiglieria 1881	Contemporary	Kraków	—	—	—	—	—	—	—	1 Michelin star
Senses	Contemporary	Warsaw	—	—	—	1 Michelin star	1 Michelin star	1 Michelin star	1 Michelin star	1 Michelin star
Reference										

== See also ==
- Lists of restaurants

== Bibliography ==
- Michelin Guide Main Cities of Europe 2013. Michelin. 2013. ISBN 978-2-06-718069-7.
- Michelin Guide Main Cities of Europe 2014. Michelin. 2014. ISBN 978-2-06-718904-1.
- Michelin Guide Main Cities of Europe 2015. Michelin. 2015. ISBN 978-2-06-719701-5.
- Michelin Guide Main Cities of Europe 2016. Michelin. 2016. ISBN 978-2-06-720638-0.
- Michelin Guide Main Cities of Europe 2017. Michelin. 2017. ISBN 978-2-06-721475-0.
- Michelin Guide Main Cities of Europe 2018. Michelin. 2018. ISBN 978-2-06-722378-3.
- Michelin Guide Main Cities of Europe 2019. Michelin. 2019. ISBN 978-2-06-723050-7.
- Michelin Guide Main Cities of Europe 2020. Michelin. 2020. ISBN 978-2-06-724190-9.
