= List of Michelin Bib Gourmand restaurants in the Philippines =

As of the 2027 Michelin Guide, a total of 31 restaurants in the Philippines have a Michelin Bib Gourmand recognition.

The Michelin Guides have been published by the French tire company Michelin since 1900. They were designed as a guide to tell drivers about eateries they recommended to visit and to subtly sponsor their tires, by encouraging drivers to use their cars more and therefore need to replace the tires as they wore out. The Michelin Bib Gourmand designation debuted internationally in 1997 and highlights restaurants offering "exceptionally good food at moderate prices". They must offer menu items priced below a maximum determined by local economic standards.

Per Michelin's own rating system, the Bib Gourmand is considered "Not quite a star, but most definitely not a consolation prize" and a "just-as-esteemed rating." As with Michelin stars, restaurants can also lose their Bib Gourmand designation. Bib Gourmand restaurants are assessed often by Michelin's inspectors, and must meet the required standards to remain on the list.

The inaugural edition of the Michelin Guide in the Philippines was launched in October 2025 at the Manila Marriott Hotel as the 2026 edition, covering Manila and its suburbs, as well as Cebu City. The Philippines became the fifth country in Southeast Asia to have a Michelin Guide.

== Calabarzon ==
As of the 2027 Michelin Guide, there are 2 restaurants in the Calabarzon region with a Bib Gourmand rating. Currently, Michelin's evaluation scope within the region is exclusively limited to Cavite province.

Key
✅	Indicates a restaurant with a Michelin Bib Gourmand designation

Name	Cuisine	Location	2026	2027
Bawai’s Vietnamese Kitchen	Vietnamese	Cavite – Silang	—	✅
Balay Dako	Filipino	Cavite – Tagaytay	—	✅
Reference(s)				

== Central Luzon ==
As of the 2027 Michelin Guide, there are 2 restaurants in the Central Luzon region with a Bib Gourmand rating. Currently, Michelin's evaluation scope within the region is exclusively limited to Pampanga province.

Key
✅	Indicates a restaurant with a Michelin Bib Gourmand designation

Name	Cuisine	Location	2026	2027
Apag Marangle	Filipino	Pampanga – Guagua	—	✅
Tito Boy	European	Pampanga – Angeles	—	✅
Reference(s)				

== Central Visayas ==
As of the 2027 Michelin Guide, there are 7 restaurants in the Central Visayas region with a Bib Gourmand rating. Currently, Michelin's evaluation scope within the region is exclusively limited to Cebu City, the provincial capital of Cebu province.

Key
✅	Indicates a restaurant with a Michelin Bib Gourmand designation

Name	Cuisine	Location	2026	2027
Abaseria Deli & Cafe	Filipino	Cebu City	✅	✅
Ato-Ah	Filipino	Cebu City	—	✅
Cur8	Asian Fusion	Cebu City	✅	Closed
Esmen	Filipino	Cebu City	✅	✅
Kalipay	Filipino	Cebu City	—	✅
Lasa	Filipino	Cebu City	✅	✅
Pares Batchoy Food House	Filipino	Cebu City	✅	Closed
Tatang's Lechon	Filipino	Cebu City	—	✅
The Pig & Palm	British	Cebu City	✅	✅
Reference(s)				

== Metro Manila ==
As of the 2027 Michelin Guide, there are 20 restaurants in the Metro Manila administrative region with a Bib Gourmand rating.

Key
✅	Indicates a restaurant with a Michelin Bib Gourmand designation

Name	Cuisine	Location	2026	2027
Azela	Filipino	Manila	—	✅
Bolero	Spanish	Taguig	✅	✅
Brick Corner	Indian	Taguig	✅	✅
Butcher Boy	Asian	Las Piñas	—	✅
Cabel	Filipino	Manila	✅	✅
C.H.E. Bacolod Chicken House Express	Grill	Makati	—	✅
Cochi	Filipino	Taguig	✅	✅
Em Hà Nội	Vietnamese	Taguig	✅	✅
Hálong	Mexican / Asian Fusion	Makati	✅	—
Kumba	Asian Fusion	Parañaque	✅	✅
La Pita (Poblacion)	Middle Eastern	Makati	✅	✅
Lampara	Filipino	Makati	✅	✅
Los Tacos	Mexican	Taguig	✅	✅
Manam at the Triangle	Filipino	Makati	✅	✅
Morning Sun Eatery	Filipino	Quezon City	✅	✅
Palm Grill (Diliman)	Filipino	Quezon City	✅	✅
Pilya's Kitchen	Chinese	Makati	✅	✅
Sarsa	Filipino	Makati	✅	✅
Some Thai	Thai	Quezon City	✅	✅
Taquería Franco	Mexican	Makati	✅	✅
The Underbelly	Japanese	Makati	✅	✅
Your Local	Asian Fusion	Makati	✅	—
Reference(s)				

== See also ==
- List of Michelin-starred restaurants in the Philippines
