= List of Michelin-starred restaurants in Argentina =

As of the 2026 Michelin Guide, there are 14 restaurants in Argentina with a Michelin-star rating, a rating system used by the Michelin Guide to grade restaurants based on their quality.

The Michelin Guides have been published by the French tire company Michelin since 1900. They were designed as a guide to tell drivers about eateries they recommended to visit and to subtly sponsor their tires, by encouraging drivers to use their cars more and therefore need to replace the tires as they wore out. Over time, the stars that were given out started to become more valuable.

Multiple anonymous Michelin inspectors visit the restaurants several times. They rate the restaurants on five criteria: "quality of products", "mastery of flavor and cooking techniques", "the personality of the chef represented in the dining experience", "value for money", and "consistency between inspectors' visits". Inspectors have at least ten years of expertise and create a list of popular restaurants supported by media reports, reviews, and diner popularity. If they reach a consensus, Michelin awards restaurants from one to three stars based on its evaluation methodology: One star means "high-quality cooking, worth a stop", two stars signify "excellent cooking, worth a detour", and three stars denote "exceptional cuisine, worth a special journey". The stars are not permanent and restaurants are constantly being re-evaluated. If the criteria are not met, the restaurant will lose its stars.

Argentina is the first Hispanic Latin American country to be covered by the Michelin Guide with the inaugural edition announced in November 2023 for the 2024 edition.

At launch, the guide was funded in partnership with the Government of Argentina, as well as municipal governments in Buenos Aires and Mendoza. In April 2026, the Argentine government announced it would cease funding the guide, making it unclear if Michelin would continue publishing in the country until the municipal governments in Buenos Aires and Mendoza provided stopgap funding to allow the guide to publish its 2026 edition in July.

== Lists ==
Key
1 Michelin star	One Michelin star
2 Michelin stars	Two Michelin stars
—	The restaurant did not receive a star that year

Name	Cuisine	Location	2024	2025	2026
Angélica Cocina Maestra	Creative	Mendoza – Luján de Cuyo	—	1 Michelin star	1 Michelin star
Aramburu	Contemporary	Buenos Aires – Recoleta	2 Michelin stars	2 Michelin stars	2 Michelin stars
Azafrán	Contemporary	Mendoza – Ciudad de Mendoza	1 Michelin star	1 Michelin star	1 Michelin star
Brindillas	Contemporary	Mendoza – Luján de Cuyo	1 Michelin star	1 Michelin star	1 Michelin star
Cal	Creative	Mendoza – Tupungato	—	—	1 Michelin star
Casa Vigil	Argentine	Mendoza – Maipú	1 Michelin star	1 Michelin star	1 Michelin star
Centauro	Contemporary	Mendoza – Ciudad de Mendoza	—	—	1 Michelin star
Crizia	Contemporary	Buenos Aires – Palermo	—	1 Michelin star	1 Michelin star
Don Julio	Argentine	Buenos Aires – Palermo	1 Michelin star	1 Michelin star	1 Michelin star
Han	Korean	Buenos Aires – Villa Crespo	—	—	1 Michelin star
La Vida	Argentine	Mendoza – Chacras de Coria	—	—	1 Michelin star
Riccitelli Bistró	Argentine	Mendoza – Las Compuertas	—	1 Michelin star	1 Michelin star
Trescha	Contemporary	Buenos Aires – Villa Crespo	1 Michelin star	1 Michelin star	1 Michelin star
Zonda Cocina de Paisaje	Argentine	Mendoza – Mayor Drummond	1 Michelin star	1 Michelin star	1 Michelin star
Reference					

== See also ==
- List of Michelin-starred restaurants in Brazil
- Lists of restaurants
