= List of Cambodian restaurants =

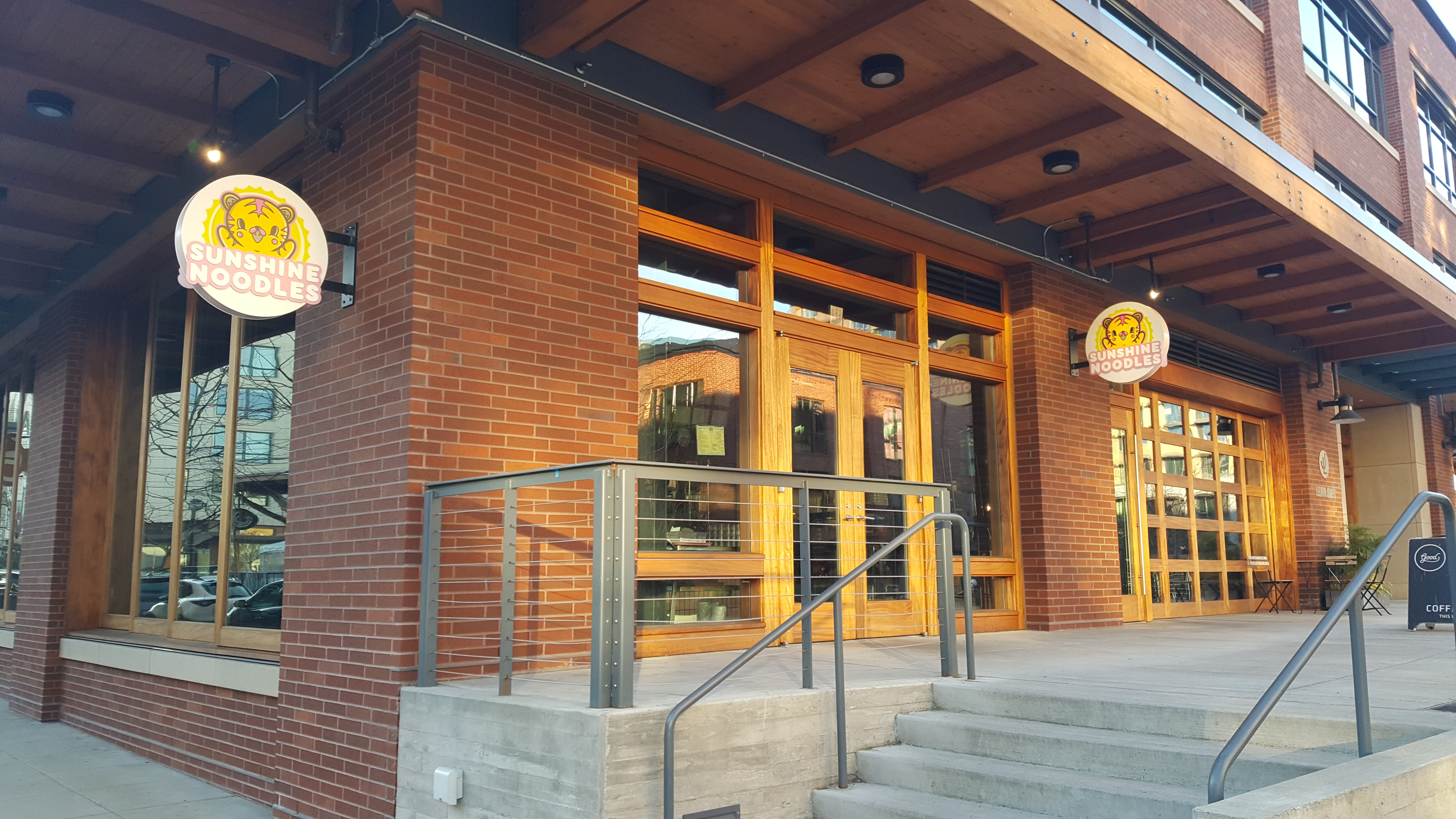
Sunshine Noodles, Portland, Oregon

Following is a list of notable restaurants known for serving Cambodian cuisine:

- Elephant Walk – Boston, Massachusetts, United States
- Malis – Siem Reap and Phnom Penh, Cambodia
- Nyum Bai – Oakland, California, United States
- Phnom Penh – Vancouver, British Columbia, Canada
- Phnom Penh Noodle House – Seattle, Washington, United States
- Sophon – Seattle
- Sunshine Noodles – Portland, Oregon, United States
