= Vysoký Újezd (Beroun District) =

- Municipality
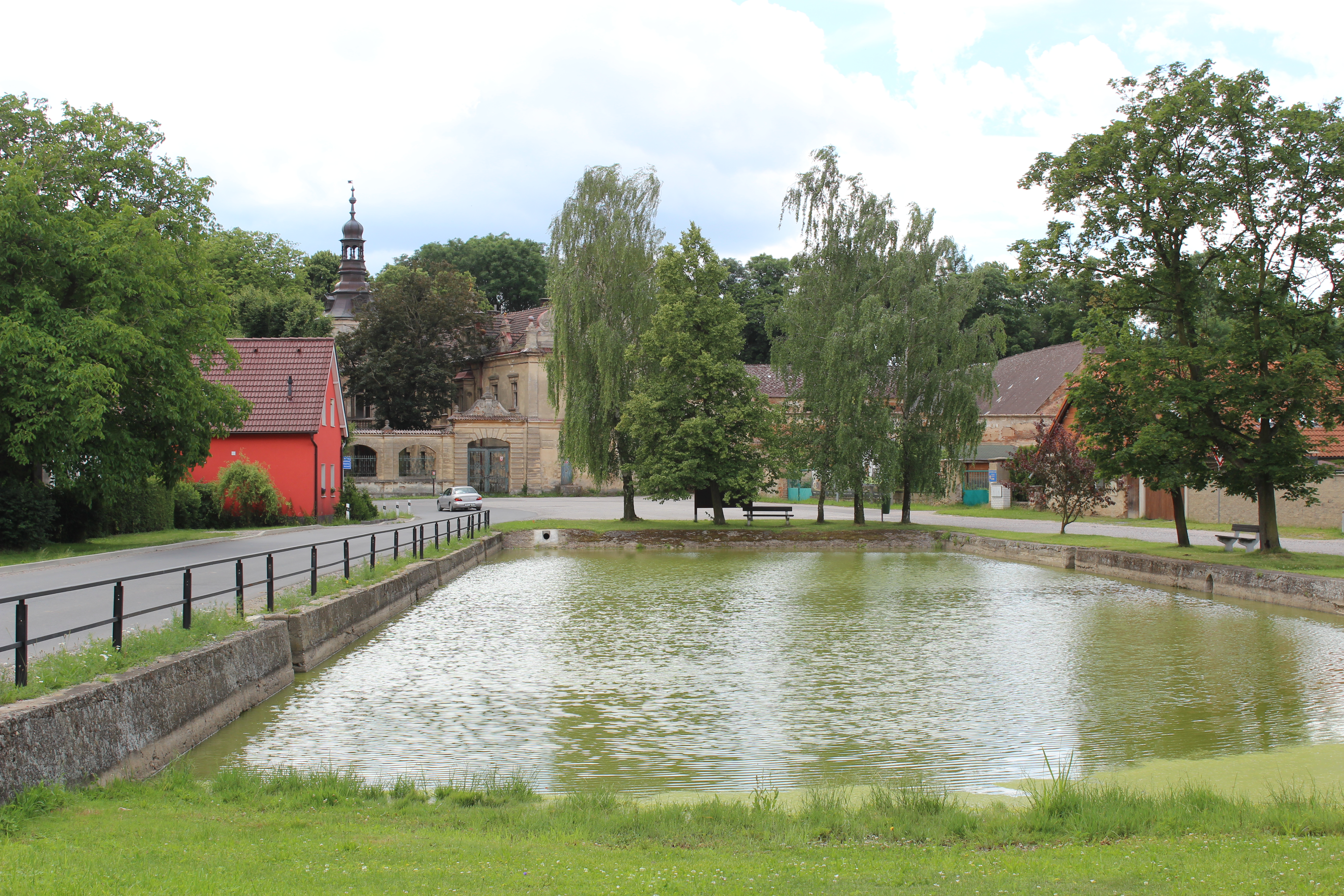
- Centre of Vysoký Újezd

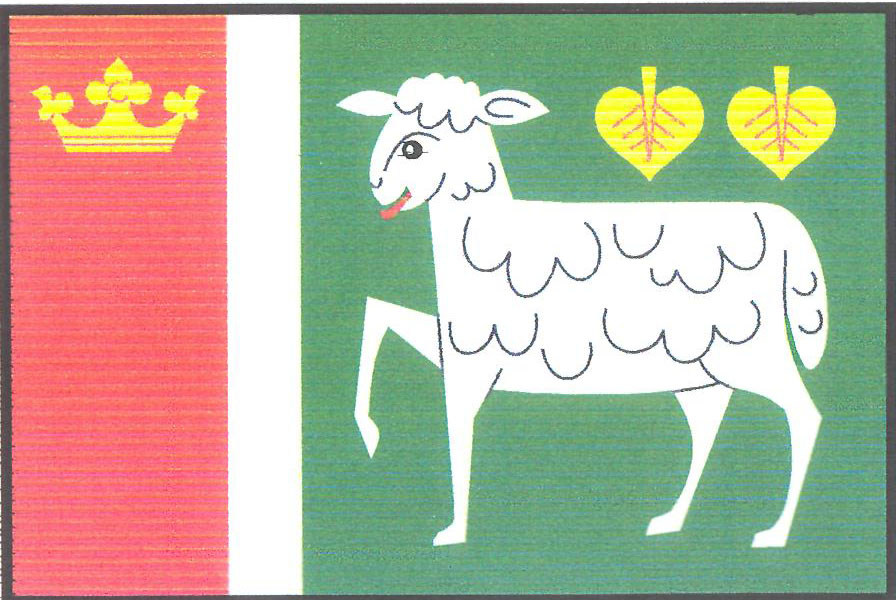
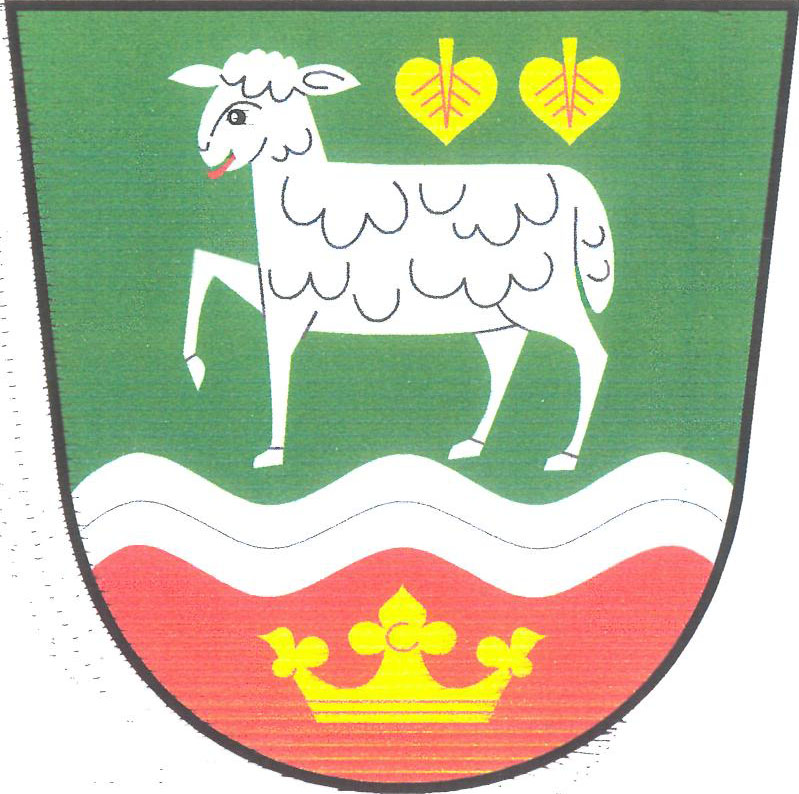
- Flag Coat of arms

- Location in the Czech Republic
- Coordinates: 49°59′32″N 14°12′23″E
- Country: Czech Republic
- Region: Central Bohemian
- District: Beroun
- First mentioned: 1310

Area
  - Total: 11.56 km^{2} (4.46 sq mi)
- Elevation: 423 m (1,388 ft)

Population (2026-01-01)
  - Total: 2,137
  - Density: 184.9/km^{2} (478.8/sq mi)
- Time zone: UTC+1 (CET)
  - Summer (DST): UTC+2 (CEST)
- Postal codes: 267 16, 267 18
- Website: www.vysoky-ujezd-urad.cz

Vysoký Újezd is a municipality and village in Beroun District in the Central Bohemian Region of the Czech Republic. It has about 2,100 inhabitants.

== Administrative division ==
Vysoký Újezd consists of three municipal parts (in brackets population according to the 2021 census):

- Vysoký Újezd (1,253)
- Kozolupy (249)
- Kuchař (190)

Kozolupy forms an exclave of the municipal territory.

== Etymology ==
The name Vysoký Újezd means 'high Újezd' in Czech.

== Geography ==
Vysoký Újezd is located about 10 kilometres (6 mi) east of Beroun and 11 km (7 mi) southwest of Prague. It lies mostly in the Hořovice Uplands, only the western part of the municipality with the Kuchař village extends into the Prague Plateau. A small southwestern part the municipal territory extends into the Bohemian Karst Protected Landscape Area.

== History ==
The first written mention of Vysoký Újezd is from 1310. The most notable owner of the estate was the Schlick family. They owned Vysoký Újezd from 1693 to 1883.

== Demographics ==
Historical population

Year	Pop.	±%
1869	774	—
1880	851	+9.9%
1890	1,039	+22.1%
1900	1,165	+12.1%
1910	1,203	+3.3%

Year	Pop.	±%
1921	1,083	−10.0%
1930	1,083	+0.0%
1950	736	−32.0%
1961	731	−0.7%
1970	671	−8.2%

Year	Pop.	±%
1980	583	−13.1%
1991	524	−10.1%
2001	516	−1.5%
2011	646	+25.2%
2021	1,692	+161.9%

Source: Censuses

== Transport ==
There are no major roads passing through the municipality. The railway that runs through the municipality is unused.

== Sport ==
Vysoký Újezd is known for a golf course. It has an area of over 80 ha (200 acres).

== Sights ==
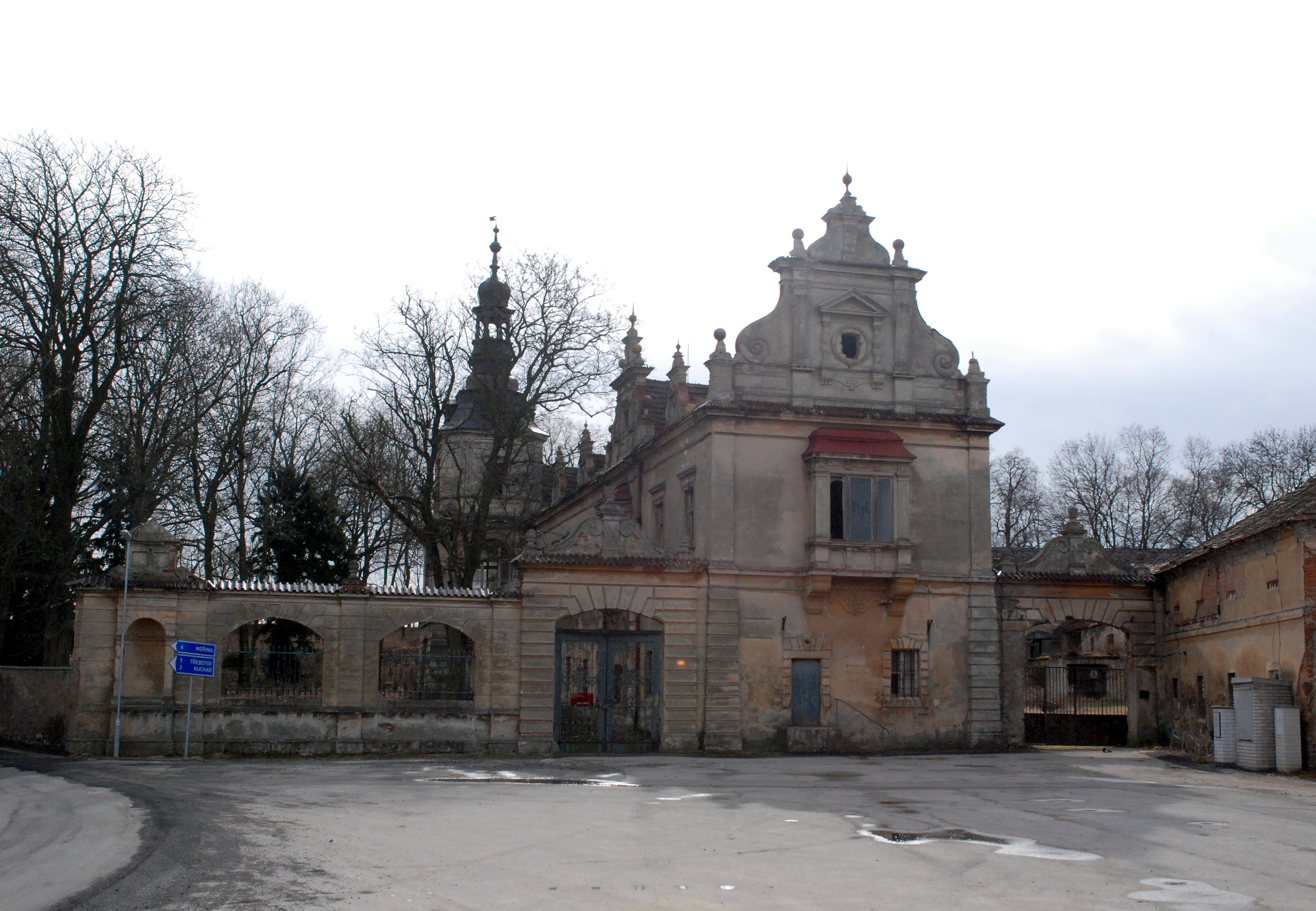
Vysoký Újezd Castle

The main landmark of Vysoký Újezd is the Vysoký Újezd Castle. It was built in the Neo-Renaissance style in 1897 as an extension of a Baroque manor house. Today it is dilapidated and unused.
