= List of Michelin Bib Gourmand restaurants in Malaysia =

As of the 2027 Michelin Guide, A total of 60 restaurants in Malaysia have a Michelin Bib Gourmand recognition.

The Michelin Guides have been published by the French tire company Michelin since 1900. They were designed as a guide to tell drivers about eateries they recommended to visit and to subtly sponsor their tires, by encouraging drivers to use their cars more and therefore need to replace the tires as they wore out. The Michelin Bib Gourmand designation debuted internationally in 1997 and highlights restaurants offering "exceptionally good food at moderate prices". They must offer menu items priced below a maximum determined by local economic standards.

Per Michelin's own rating system, the Bib Gourmand is considered "Not quite a star, but most definitely not a consolation prize" and a "just-as-esteemed rating." As with Michelin stars, restaurants can also lose their Bib Gourmand designation. Bib Gourmand restaurants are assessed often by Michelin's inspectors, and must meet the required standards to remain on the list.

The Michelin Guide debuted in Malaysia in December 2022 for the 2023 edition, assessing restaurants in Kuala Lumpur and Penang.

== Kuala Lumpur ==
As of the 2027 Michelin Guide, there are 26 restaurants in Kuala Lumpur with a Bib Gourmand rating.

Key
✅	Indicates a restaurant with a Michelin Bib Gourmand designation
—	The restaurant did not receive a Bib Gourmand that year
Closed	The restaurant is no longer open

Name	Cuisine	Location	2023	2024	2025	2026	2027
7 Chai Ipoh Hor Fun	Malaysian	Ampang Jaya	—	—	—	—	✅
Ah Hei Bak Kut Teh	Malaysian	Kuala Lumpur – Pudu	✅	✅	✅	✅	✅
Aliyaa	Sri Lankan	Kuala Lumpur – Segambut	✅	✅	✅	✅	✅
Anak Baba	Peranakan	Kuala Lumpur – Brickfields	✅	✅	✅	✅	✅
Coast by Kayra	Indian	Kuala Lumpur – Bukit Bintang	—	—	✅	✅	✅
Congkak	Malaysian	Kuala Lumpur – Bukit Bintang	✅	✅	✅	✅	✅
Dancing Fish	Indonesian	Kuala Lumpur – Bangsar	✅	✅	—	—	—
De. Wan 1958	Malaysian	Kuala Lumpur – Taman U Thant	✅	✅	✅	✅	✅
Foong Lian	Chinese	Kuala Lumpur – Pudu	—	—	✅	✅	✅
Gulainya	Peranakan	Kuala Lumpur – Segambut	—	—	—	✅	✅
Hai Kah Lang	Seafood	Kuala Lumpur – Taman Cheras	✅	✅	✅	✅	✅
Heun Kee Claypot Chicken Rice	Chinese	Kuala Lumpur – Pudu	✅	✅	✅	Closed	
Hing Kee Bakuteh	Malaysian	Kuala Lumpur – Taman Usahawan	✅	✅	✅	✅	✅
Hor Poh Cuisine	Hakka	Kuala Lumpur – Segambut	—	✅	✅	✅	✅
Jalan Ipoh Claypot Chicken Rice	Chinese	Kuala Lumpur – Taman Kok Lian	—	✅	✅	✅	✅
Lai Fong Lala Noodles	Chinese	Kuala Lumpur – Bukit Bintang	✅	✅	✅	✅	✅
Lama	Peranakan	Kuala Lumpur – Taman Ayer Panas	—	—	—	✅	✅
Leen's	Syrian	Kuala Lumpur – TTDI	—	—	✅	✅	✅
Minji Bak Kut Teh	Malaysian	Kuala Lumpur – Pudu	—	—	—	—	✅
MTR 1924	Indian	Kuala Lumpur – Brickfields	—	—	✅	✅	✅
Nam Heong Chicken Rice	Malaysian	Kuala Lumpur – City Centre	✅	✅	✅	✅	✅
Nasi Ayam Hainan Chee Meng	Malaysian	Kuala Lumpur – Kelang Lama	✅	✅	✅	✅	✅
Nirwana	Indian	Kuala Lumpur – Bangsar	—	✅	✅	✅	✅
Restoran Pik Wah	Chinese	Kuala Lumpur – City Centre	✅	✅	✅	—	—
Roti by d'Tandoor	Indian	Kuala Lumpur – Keramat	—	✅	✅	✅	✅
Sao Nam	Vietnamese	Kuala Lumpur – Bukit Bintang	✅	✅	✅	✅	✅
Sek Yuen	Chinese	Kuala Lumpur – Pudu	—	✅	✅	✅	✅
Sin Kiew Yee Shin Kee	Chinese	Kuala Lumpur – City Centre	—	—	✅	✅	✅
Wong Mei Kee	Chinese	Kuala Lumpur – Pudu	✅	✅	✅	✅	✅
Reference(s)							

== Penang ==
As of the 2027 Michelin Guide, there are 34 restaurants in Penang with a Bib Gourmand rating.

Key
✅	Indicates a restaurant with a Michelin Bib Gourmand designation
—	The restaurant did not receive a Bib Gourmand that year
Closed	The restaurant is no longer open

Name	Cuisine	Location	2023	2024	2025	2026	2027
Ah Boy Koay Teow Th’ng	Malaysian	George Town	—	✅	✅	✅	—
Awesome Char Koay Teow	Malaysian	George Town	—	—	—	✅	✅
Bee Hwa Cafe	Malaysian	George Town	—	—	—	✅	✅
Bibik's Kitchen	Peranakan	George Town	—	✅	✅	✅	✅
BM Cathay Pancake	Malaysian	Seberang Perai	—	✅	✅	✅	✅
BM Yam Rice	Chinese	Seberang Perai	—	—	✅	✅	✅
Bridge Street Prawn Noodle	Malaysian	George Town	✅	✅	✅	✅	✅
Communal Table by Gēn	Malaysian	George Town	✅	✅	✅	✅	✅
Duck Blood Curry Mee	Malaysian	George Town	✅	✅	✅	✅	✅
Ghee Lian	Thai	George Town	—	✅	✅	✅	✅
Green House Prawn Mee & Loh Mee	Malaysian	George Town	✅	✅	✅	✅	✅
Hot Bowl White Curry Mee	Malaysian	George Town	—	✅	✅	✅	✅
Ivy’s Nyonya Cuisine	Peranakan	George Town	✅	✅	✅	✅	✅
Laksalicious	Malaysian	George Town	—	—	✅	✅	✅
Lemon Koay Teow Soup	Malaysian	Seberang Perai	—	—	—	—	✅
Lum Lai Duck Meat Koay Teow Th'ng	Malaysian	George Town	—	—	✅	✅	✅
Ming Qing Charcoal Duck Egg	Chinese	Seberang Perai	✅	✅	✅	✅	✅
Moh Teng Pheow Nyonya Koay	Malaysian	George Town	✅	✅	✅	✅	✅
My Own Cafe	Malaysian	George Town	—	✅	✅	✅	✅
Neighbourwood	European	Seberang Perai	✅	✅	✅	✅	✅
Penang Rd. Famous Jin Kor Char Kuey Teow	Malaysian	George Town	—	✅	✅	✅	✅
Penang Rd. Famous Laksa	Malaysian	George Town	✅	✅	✅	✅	✅
Rasa Rasa	Peranakan	George Town	✅	✅	✅	✅	✅
Ravi's Famous Apom Manis	Indian	George Town	—	—	✅	✅	✅
Sardaarji	Indian	George Town	✅	✅	✅	✅	✅
Serabai Istimewa	Malaysian	George Town	—	—	✅	—	✅
Siam Road Char Koay Teow	Malaysian	George Town	—	✅	✅	✅	✅
Sifu	Peranakan	George Town	—	—	—	✅	✅
Sister Yao’s Char Koay Kak	Malaysian	George Town	—	✅	✅	✅	✅
Super Star Koay Teow Soup	Malaysian	George Town	—	—	✅	✅	✅
Taman Bukit Curry Mee	Malaysian	Seberang Perai	✅	✅	✅	✅	✅
Teksen	Chinese	George Town	✅	✅	✅	✅	✅
Thara	Thai	George Town	✅	✅	✅	✅	✅
Theeni Pandarams	Indian	George Town	✅	✅	Closed		
Tho Yuen	Chinese	George Town	✅	✅	✅	—	—
Wan Dao Tou Assam Laksa	Malaysian	George Town	✅	✅	✅	✅	✅
Winn’s Cafe	Peranakan	George Town	—	—	✅	✅	✅
Reference(s)							

== See also ==
- List of Michelin-starred restaurants in Malaysia
