= List of Michelin Bib Gourmand restaurants in Thailand =

As of the 2027 Michelin Guide, a total of 151 restaurants in Thailand have a Michelin Bib Gourmand recognition.

The Michelin Guides have been published by the French tire company Michelin since 1900. They were designed as a guide to tell drivers about eateries they recommended to visit and to subtly sponsor their tires, by encouraging drivers to use their cars more and therefore need to replace the tires as they wore out. The Michelin Bib Gourmand designation debuted internationally in 1997 and highlights restaurants offering "exceptionally good food at moderate prices". They must offer menu items priced below a maximum determined by local economic standards.

Per Michelin's own rating system, the Bib Gourmand is considered "Not quite a star, but most definitely not a consolation prize" and a "just-as-esteemed rating." As with Michelin stars, restaurants can also lose their Bib Gourmand designation. Bib Gourmand restaurants are assessed often by Michelin's inspectors, and must meet the required standards to remain on the list.

The 2018 edition was the inaugural edition of the Michelin Guide in Thailand, initially only covering Bangkok. It was the seventh Asian city or region to have a dedicated Guide. The Guide was funded with 144 million Thai Baht (US$4,456,000) over five years by the Tourism Authority of Thailand. The funding was also part of an effort to increase street food's recognition in the guide. Michelin expanded its Thailand coverage over several years: Phuket and Phang-Nga in 2019, Chiang Mai in 2020, Ayutthaya in 2022, four northeastern provinces (Nakhon Ratchasima, Ubon Ratchathani, Udon Thani, and Khon Kaen) in 2023, and most recently Chonburi in the 2025 edition.

== Ayutthaya ==
As of the 2027 Michelin Guide, there are 9 restaurants in Ayutthaya province with a Bib Gourmand rating. Michelin began reviewing restaurants in the province starting in the 2020 guide.

Key
| ✅ | Indicates a restaurant with a Michelin Bib Gourmand designation |
| — | The restaurant did not receive a Bib Gourmand that year |

=== 2021–2027 ===
| Name | Cuisine | Location | 2021 | 2022 | 2023 | 2024 | 2025 | 2026 | 2027 |
|---|---|---|---|---|---|---|---|---|---|
| Baan Pu Karn | Thai | Phra Nakhon Si Ayutthaya | | | | | | ✅ | ✅ |
| Baan Ta Ko Rai | Thai | Tha Ruea | | | | | | ✅ | ✅ |
| Kha Mu Jae Mhai | Chinese | Phra Nakhon Si Ayutthaya | | | | | | — | ✅ |
| Khanom Mho Kaeng Mae Yai (Phai Ling) | Dessert | Phra Nakhon Si Ayutthaya | | | | | | ✅ | ✅ |
| Kin Lookdeaw | Thai | Tha Ruea | | | | | | ✅ | ✅ |
| Pa Lek Boat Noodles | Thai | Phra Nakhon Si Ayutthaya | | | | | | ✅ | ✅ |
| Pranom Shredded Chicken Noodles (Tha Wasukri) | Thai | Phra Nakhon Si Ayutthaya | | | | | | ✅ | ✅ |
| Ruan Thai Kung Pao | Thai | Bang Sai | | | | | | ✅ | ✅ |
| U-Khao | Thai | Bang Pa-in | | | | | | ✅ | ✅ |
| Reference | | | | | | | | | |

== Bangkok ==
As of the 2027 Michelin Guide, there are 39 restaurants in Bangkok with a Bib Gourmand rating. Michelin began reviewing restaurants in the city starting in the inaugural 2018 guide.

Key
| ✅ | Indicates a restaurant with a Michelin Bib Gourmand designation |
| — | The restaurant did not receive a Bib Gourmand that year |

=== 2021–2027 ===
| Name | Cuisine | Location | 2021 | 2022 | 2023 | 2024 | 2025 | 2026 | 2027 |
|---|---|---|---|---|---|---|---|---|---|
| Ann Tha Din Daeng | Seafood | Bangkok – Khlong San | | | | | | ✅ | ✅ |
| Aunglo by Yangrak | Thai | Bangkok – Bang Rak | | | | | | ✅ | ✅ |
| Baan Pee Lek | Thai | Bangkok – Prawet | | | | | | ✅ | ✅ |
| Beer Hima (Chatuchak) | Thai | Bangkok – Chatuchak | | | | | | ✅ | ✅ |
| Bokkia Tha Din Daeng | Dessert | Bangkok – Khlong San | | | | | | ✅ | ✅ |
| Bunloet (Pomp Prap Sattru Phai) | Thai | Bangkok – Pom Prap Sattru Phai | | | | | | ✅ | ✅ |
| Duck Noodle House | Thai | Bangkok – Samphanthawong | | | | | | — | ✅ |
| Gim Nguan Noodle | Thai | Bangkok – Chom Thong | | | | | | ✅ | ✅ |
| Gokfayuen | Chinese | Bangkok – Vadhana | | | | | | — | ✅ |
| Here Hai (Vadhana) | Seafood | Bangkok – Vadhana | | | | | | ✅ | — |
| Hia Wan Khao Tom Pla | Thai / Chinese | Bangkok – Chom Thong | | | | | | ✅ | ✅ |
| Jaan | Thai | Bangkok – Yan Nawa | — | — | — | — | — | ✅ | — |
| Janhom | Thai | Bangkok – Wang Thonglang | | | | | | ✅ | ✅ |
| Jay Ngor Beef Noodle | Thai | Bangkok – Dusit | | | | | | — | ✅ |
| K. Panich | Dessert | Bangkok – Phra Nakhon | | | | | | ✅ | ✅ |
| Kamkinsuk | Thai | Bangkok – Huai Khwang | | | | | | — | ✅ |
| Kao Soy Prin | Thai | Bangkok – Bang Rak | | | | | | — | ✅ |
| Keawloon | Thai | Bangkok – Khlong Toei | — | — | — | — | — | ✅ | ✅ |
| Kin Kub Koi | Seafood | Bangkok – Thawi Watthana | | | | | | ✅ | ✅ |
| Kolun.h | Thai / Chinese | Bangkok – Phra Nakhon | — | — | — | — | — | ✅ | ✅ |
| Krua Apsorn (Dusit) | Thai | Bangkok – Dusit | | | | | | ✅ | ✅ |
| Lucky Seafood | Seafood | Bangkok – Taling Chan | | | | | | ✅ | ✅ |
| Maan Muang | Thai | Bangkok – Saphan Sung | | | | | | ✅ | ✅ |
| Mae Prapha Crispy Pancake (Phra Nakhon) | Dessert | Bangkok – Phra Nakhon | | | | | | — | ✅ |
| Mae Thum Padthai Kheng | Thai | Bangkok – Phra Nakhon | | | | | | — | ✅ |
| No Name Noodle | Japanese | Bangkok – Khlong Toei | | | | | | ✅ | ✅ |
| Pad Thai Fai Ta Lu (Phra Nakhon) | Thai | Bangkok – Phra Nakhon | | | | | | ✅ | ✅ |
| Pae Brass Pot Porridge | Chinese | Bangkok – Bang Sue | | | | | | ✅ | ✅ |
| Phed Phed Bistro | Thai | Bangkok – Taling Chan | | | | | | ✅ | ✅ |
| Plu | Thai | Bangkok – Sathon | | | | | | ✅ | ✅ |
| Prik-Yuak (Phaya Thai) | Thai | Bangkok – Phaya Thai | | | | | | ✅ | ✅ |
| Rue Poh | Seafood | Bangkok – Prawet | | | | | | — | ✅ |
| Rung Rueang Tung Pork Noodle | Thai | Bangkok – Khlong Toei | | | | | | ✅ | ✅ |
| Samlor | Thai | Bangkok – Bang Rak | | | | | | ✅ | ✅ |
| Sane | Thai | Bangkok – Taling Chan | | | | | | — | ✅ |
| Somsak Pu Ob | Seafood | Bangkok – Khlong San | | | | | | ✅ | ✅ |
| Ten Suns | Thai | Bangkok – Phra Nakhon | | | | | | ✅ | ✅ |
| Thai Niyom | Thai | Bangkok – Pathum Wan | | | | | | ✅ | ✅ |
| Thai Tham | Thai / Chinese | Bangkok – Phra Nakhon | | | | | | ✅ | ✅ |
| Thien Duong | Vietnamese | Bangkok – Bang Rak | | | | | | ✅ | ✅ |
| Urai Braised Goose | Thai / Chinese | Bangkok – Samphanthawong | | | | | | ✅ | ✅ |
| Reference | | | | | | | | | |

== Chiang Mai ==
As of the 2027 Michelin Guide, there are 20 restaurants in Chiang Mai province with a Bib Gourmand rating. Michelin began reviewing restaurants in the province starting in the 2020 guide.

Key
| ✅ | Indicates a restaurant with a Michelin Bib Gourmand designation |
| — | The restaurant did not receive a Bib Gourmand that year |

=== 2021–2027 ===
| Name | Cuisine | Location | 2021 | 2022 | 2023 | 2024 | 2025 | 2026 | 2027 |
|---|---|---|---|---|---|---|---|---|---|
| Baan Nam Ngiew Wieng Kao | Thai | Chiang Mai | | | | | | — | ✅ |
| Chawee | Thai | Chiang Mai | | | | | | ✅ | ✅ |
| Dan Chicken Rice (San Sai) | Singaporean | San Sai | | | | | | ✅ | ✅ |
| Euang Kam Sai | Thai | Chiang Mai | | | | | | ✅ | ✅ |
| Gongkham | Thai | Mae Rim | | | | | | ✅ | ✅ |
| Guay Jub Chang Moi Tat Mai | Thai | Chiang Mai | | | | | | ✅ | ✅ |
| Huan Soontaree | Thai | Chiang Mai | | | | | | ✅ | ✅ |
| Huen Jai Yong | Thai | San Kamphaeng | | | | | | — | ✅ |
| Huen Muan Jai | Thai | Chiang Mai | | | | | | ✅ | ✅ |
| Jaan Joor | Thai | Chiang Mai | | | | | | — | ✅ |
| Khao Soi Mae Sai | Thai | Chiang Mai | | | | | | ✅ | ✅ |
| Lhongkhao Kitchen | Thai | Mae Rim | | | | | | ✅ | ✅ |
| Lung Khajohn Wat Ket | Thai | Chiang Mai | | | | | | ✅ | ✅ |
| Magnolia Cafe | Thai | Chiang Mai | | | | | | ✅ | ✅ |
| Meena | Thai | San Kamphaeng | | | | | | ✅ | ✅ |
| Rasik Local Kitchen | Thai | Chiang Mai | | | | | | ✅ | ✅ |
| Roti Pa Day (Tha Phae Road) | Pakistani | Chiang Mai | | | | | | ✅ | ✅ |
| Saiyut and Doctor Sai | Thai | Chiang Mai | | | | | | ✅ | ✅ |
| Sanae | Thai | Chiang Mai | | | | | | ✅ | ✅ |
| Sanpakoi Kanomjeen | Thai | Chiang Mai | | | | | | ✅ | — |
| Tue Ka Ko Na Prince | Thai | Chiang Mai | | | | | | ✅ | ✅ |
| Reference | | | | | | | | | |

== Chonburi ==
As of the 2027 Michelin Guide, there are 6 restaurants in Chonburi province with a Bib Gourmand rating. Michelin began reviewing restaurants in the province starting in the 2025 guide.

Key
| ✅ | Indicates a restaurant with a Michelin Bib Gourmand designation |
| — | The restaurant did not receive a Bib Gourmand that year |

| Name | Cuisine | Location | 2025 | 2026 | 2027 |
|---|---|---|---|---|---|
| Khao Lam Mae Khai Toon Klao | Thai | Chonburi | ✅ | ✅ | ✅ |
| Krua Jay Miad | Thai | Chonburi | — | — | ✅ |
| Krua Laew Tae R-Rom | Thai | Pattaya City | ✅ | ✅ | ✅ |
| La Voi | Thai | Pattaya City | ✅ | ✅ | — |
| Lung Shall Kitchen | Thai | Pattaya City | ✅ | ✅ | ✅ |
| Pladids | Thai | Pattaya City | ✅ | ✅ | ✅ |
| Somphop Khao Tom Pla | Thai | Chonburi | — | — | ✅ |
| Reference | | | | | |

== Khon Kaen ==
As of the 2027 Michelin Guide, there are 10 restaurants in Khon Kaen province with a Bib Gourmand rating. Michelin began reviewing restaurants in the province starting in the 2023 guide.

Key
| ✅ | Indicates a restaurant with a Michelin Bib Gourmand designation |
| — | The restaurant did not receive a Bib Gourmand that year |

| Name | Cuisine | Location | 2023 | 2024 | 2025 | 2026 | 2027 |
|---|---|---|---|---|---|---|---|
| Baan Heng | Thai / Chinese | Khon Kaen | ✅ | ✅ | ✅ | ✅ | ✅ |
| Halong Bay | Vietnamese | Khon Kaen | — | — | — | — | ✅ |
| Here Joi Beef Noodle | Thai | Khon Kaen | — | ✅ | ✅ | ✅ | ✅ |
| Jok Guay Jab Tom Sen Bat Queue | Vietnamese | Khon Kaen | ✅ | ✅ | ✅ | ✅ | — |
| Kai Yang Rabaeb | Grill | Khon Kaen | ✅ | ✅ | | — | — |
| Khon Kaen Grilled Pork Neck | Thai | Khon Kaen | ✅ | ✅ | ✅ | ✅ | — |
| Khun Jaeng Guay Tiew Pak Mor Kao Wang | Thai | Khon Kaen | ✅ | ✅ | ✅ | ✅ | ✅ |
| Leng Yentafo | Thai | Khon Kaen | ✅ | ✅ | ✅ | ✅ | ✅ |
| Lom Kaow | Thai | Khon Kaen | — | — | — | — | ✅ |
| Mekin Farm | Thai | Chorakhe | ✅ | ✅ | ✅ | ✅ | ✅ |
| Pho Tha Bo | Vietnamese | Khon Kaen | — | ✅ | | — | — |
| Praprai | Thai | Khon Kaen | ✅ | ✅ | ✅ | ✅ | ✅ |
| Prasit | Thai | Khon Kaen | ✅ | ✅ | ✅ | ✅ | ✅ |
| So Jeng | Thai | Ban Phai | ✅ | ✅ | ✅ | ✅ | ✅ |
| Sriruen Pad Thai (Ruenchit Road) | Thai | Khon Kaen | — | — | ✅ | ✅ | — |
| Tumkratoei Sagate | Thai | Khon Kaen | ✅ | ✅ | | — | — |
| Reference | | | | | | | |

== Nakhon Pathom ==
As of the 2027 Michelin Guide, there are 2 restaurants in Nakhon Pathom province with a Bib Gourmand rating. Michelin began reviewing restaurants in the province starting in the 2019 guide.

Key
| ✅ | Indicates a restaurant with a Michelin Bib Gourmand designation |
| — | The restaurant did not receive a Bib Gourmand that year |

=== 2021–2027 ===
| Name | Cuisine | Location | 2021 | 2022 | 2023 | 2024 | 2025 | 2026 | 2027 |
|---|---|---|---|---|---|---|---|---|---|
| Krua Jay Sim | Thai | Nakhon Chai Si | | | | | | ✅ | ✅ |
| Nai Ngieb | Thai | Phutthamonthon | | | | | | ✅ | — |
| Plaew | Thai | Nakhon Pathom | | | | | | ✅ | ✅ |
| Reference | | | | | | | | | |

== Nakhon Ratchasima (Khorat) ==
As of the 2027 Michelin Guide, there are 9 restaurants in Nakhon Ratchasima province with a Bib Gourmand rating. Michelin began reviewing restaurants in the province starting in the 2023 guide.

Key
| ✅ | Indicates a restaurant with a Michelin Bib Gourmand designation |
| — | The restaurant did not receive a Bib Gourmand that year |

| Name | Cuisine | Location | 2023 | 2024 | 2025 | 2026 | 2027 |
|---|---|---|---|---|---|---|---|
| Baan Pang Hom | Thai | Ban Mai | ✅ | ✅ | | — | — |
| Banmai Chay Nam | Thai | Pak Chong | — | — | ✅ | ✅ | ✅ |
| Kai Yang Saeng Thai | Grill | Nakhon Ratchasima | ✅ | ✅ | ✅ | ✅ | ✅ |
| Khanom Jeen Kru Yod | Thai | Nakhon Ratchasima | ✅ | ✅ | | — | — |
| Khanom Ochin | Bakery | Nakhon Ratchasima | ✅ | ✅ | ✅ | ✅ | ✅ |
| Krua Kampan | Thai | Pak Chong | ✅ | ✅ | | — | — |
| Krua Suwimol | Thai / Chinese | Nakhon Ratchasima | ✅ | ✅ | ✅ | ✅ | ✅ |
| Laab Somphit | Thai | Nakhon Ratchasima | ✅ | ✅ | ✅ | ✅ | ✅ |
| Nina's | Thai | Pak Chong | — | ✅ | | — | — |
| Nub | Thai | Nakhon Ratchasima | — | — | — | ✅ | ✅ |
| Pa Pleung Mhee Kratok | Thai | Chok Chai | — | — | ✅ | ✅ | ✅ |
| Penlaos Khaoyai | Laotian | Pak Chong | ✅ | ✅ | | — | — |
| Piya Radna | Thai | Nakhon Ratchasima | ✅ | ✅ | | — | — |
| Rossarin | Dessert | Pak Chong | — | — | — | — | ✅ |
| Sow Jeck | Thai | Nakhon Ratchasima | — | — | ✅ | ✅ | ✅ |
| Reference | | | | | | | |

== Nonthaburi ==
As of the 2027 Michelin Guide, there are 4 restaurants in Nonthaburi province with a Bib Gourmand rating. Michelin began reviewing restaurants in the province starting in the 2019 guide.

Key
| ✅ | Indicates a restaurant with a Michelin Bib Gourmand designation |
| — | The restaurant did not receive a Bib Gourmand that year |

=== 2021–2027 ===
| Name | Cuisine | Location | 2021 | 2022 | 2023 | 2024 | 2025 | 2026 | 2027 |
|---|---|---|---|---|---|---|---|---|---|
| Chai | Seafood | Nonthaburi | | | | | | ✅ | ✅ |
| Chang-Wang-Imm | Thai | Pak Kret | | | | | | ✅ | — |
| Hong Seng | Thai / Chinese | Pak Kret | | | | | | ✅ | ✅ |
| Kaeng Pa Loong Sa-Nga | Thai | Nonthaburi | | | | | | ✅ | ✅ |
| Sann | Thai | Bang Yai | — | — | — | — | — | ✅ | ✅ |
| Reference | | | | | | | | | |

== Pathum Thani ==
As of the 2027 Michelin Guide, there are 3 restaurants in Pathum Thani province with a Bib Gourmand rating. Michelin began reviewing restaurants in the province starting in the 2019 guide.

Key
| ✅ | Indicates a restaurant with a Michelin Bib Gourmand designation |

=== 2021–2027 ===
| Name | Cuisine | Location | 2021 | 2022 | 2023 | 2024 | 2025 | 2026 | 2027 |
|---|---|---|---|---|---|---|---|---|---|
| Khao Mun Gai Nha Jone | Singaporean | Thanyaburi | | | | | | ✅ | ✅ |
| Morakot Kitchen | Thai | Thanyaburi | | | | | | ✅ | ✅ |
| Pae | Thai / Chinese | Lat Lum Kaeo | | | | | | ✅ | ✅ |
| Reference | | | | | | | | | |

== Phang Nga ==
As of the 2027 Michelin Guide, there are 9 restaurants in Phang Nga province with a Bib Gourmand rating. Michelin began reviewing restaurants in the province starting in the 2019 guide.

Key
| ✅ | Indicates a restaurant with a Michelin Bib Gourmand designation |
| — | The restaurant did not receive a Bib Gourmand that year |

=== 2021–2027 ===
| Name | Cuisine | Location | 2021 | 2022 | 2023 | 2024 | 2025 | 2026 | 2027 |
|---|---|---|---|---|---|---|---|---|---|
| Hok Kee Lao | Thai / Chinese | Takua Pa | | | | | | ✅ | ✅ |
| Krachang Khao Lak | Seafood | Thai Mueang | | | | | | ✅ | ✅ |
| Krua Khonkhon | Thai | Takua Pa | | | | | | — | ✅ |
| Krua Luang Ten | Thai | Takua Pa | | | | | | ✅ | ✅ |
| Krua Ko Yot | Thai | Takua Pa | | | | | | — | ✅ |
| Kub Khao Mae | Thai | Phang Nga | | | | | | — | ✅ |
| Mun | Thai | Thai Mueang | | | | | | ✅ | ✅ |
| Roe Dang | Thai | Thai Mueang | | | | | | ✅ | ✅ |
| Tonfon Bistro | Thai | Thap Put | | | | | | ✅ | ✅ |
| Reference | | | | | | | | | |

== Phuket ==
As of the 2027 Michelin Guide, there are 20 restaurants in Phuket province with a Bib Gourmand rating. Michelin began reviewing restaurants in the province starting in the 2019 guide.

Key
| ✅ | Indicates a restaurant with a Michelin Bib Gourmand designation |
| — | The restaurant did not receive a Bib Gourmand that year |

=== 2021–2027 ===
| Name | Cuisine | Location | 2021 | 2022 | 2023 | 2024 | 2025 | 2026 | 2027 |
|---|---|---|---|---|---|---|---|---|---|
| A Pong Mae Sunee | Dessert | Phuket | | | | | | ✅ | ✅ |
| Chuan Chim | Thai | Phuket | | | | | | ✅ | ✅ |
| Go Benz | Asian Fusion | Phuket | | | | | | ✅ | ✅ |
| Khao Tom Dibuk | Chinese | Phuket | | | | | | ✅ | ✅ |
| Kin-Kub-Ei | Thai | Thalang | | | | | | ✅ | ✅ |
| Krua Baan Platong | Thai | Thalang | | | | | | ✅ | ✅ |
| Krua Kao Kuk | Thai | Phuket | | | | | | ✅ | ✅ |
| Krua Praya | Thai | Thalang | | | | | | ✅ | ✅ |
| Lob-baan | Thai | Phuket | | | | | | — | ✅ |
| Mor Mu Dong | Thai | Phuket | | | | | | ✅ | ✅ |
| Naam Yoi | Thai | Phuket | | | | | | ✅ | ✅ |
| Niyom Salt Grilled Duck | Grill | Phuket | | | | | | ✅ | — |
| One Chun | Thai | Phuket | | | | | | ✅ | ✅ |
| Pathongko Mae Pranee | Dessert | Phuket | | | | | | ✅ | ✅ |
| Phakakrong | Thai | Phuket | | | | | | — | ✅ |
| Roti Chaofa | Malaysian | Phuket | | | | | | ✅ | ✅ |
| Roti Thaew Nam | Indian | Phuket | | | | | | ✅ | ✅ |
| Surf & Turf by Soul Kitchen | European | Phuket | | | | | | ✅ | ✅ |
| The Charm Dining Gallery | Thai / Peranakan | Phuket | | | | | | ✅ | ✅ |
| Toh Daeng (Thalang) | Thai | Thalang | | | | | | ✅ | ✅ |
| Ton Mayom | Thai | Phuket | | | | | | ✅ | ✅ |
| Reference | | | | | | | | | |

== Samut Prakan ==
As of the 2027 Michelin Guide, there are no restaurants in Samut Prakan province with a Bib Gourmand rating. Michelin began reviewing restaurants in the province starting in the 2019 guide.

== Samut Sakhon ==
As of the 2027 Michelin Guide, there is 1 restaurant in Samut Sakhon province with a Bib Gourmand rating. Michelin began reviewing restaurants in the province starting in the 2019 guide.

Key
| ✅ | Indicates a restaurant with a Michelin Bib Gourmand designation |

=== 2021–2027 ===
| Name | Cuisine | Location | 2021 | 2022 | 2023 | 2024 | 2025 | 2026 | 2027 |
|---|---|---|---|---|---|---|---|---|---|
| Ruean Panya | Thai | Samut Sakhon | | | | | | ✅ | ✅ |
| Reference | | | | | | | | | |

== Surat Thani ==
As of the 2027 Michelin Guide, there are 10 restaurants in Surat Thani province with a Bib Gourmand rating. Michelin began reviewing restaurants in the province starting in the 2024 guide.

Key
| ✅ | Indicates a restaurant with a Michelin Bib Gourmand designation |
| — | The restaurant did not receive a Bib Gourmand that year |

| Name | Cuisine | Location | 2024 | 2025 | 2026 | 2027 |
|---|---|---|---|---|---|---|
| Baan Suan Lung Khai | Seafood | Ko Samui | ✅ | ✅ | ✅ | ✅ |
| Dear Phangan | Thai | Ko Pha-ngan | — | — | ✅ | ✅ |
| Jun Hom | Thai | Ko Samui | ✅ | ✅ | ✅ | ✅ |
| Kapi Sator (Soi Had Chaweng 5) | Thai | Ko Samui | ✅ | ✅ | — | — |
| Keo Pla | Thai | Surat Thani | ✅ | ✅ | ✅ | ✅ |
| Khao Phra Ram Long Song Lao Ohw | Thai | Surat Thani | ✅ | ✅ | — | — |
| Krua Chao Baan Samui | Thai | Ko Samui | ✅ | ✅ | — | — |
| Lian Tai | Dessert | Surat Thani | ✅ | ✅ | — | — |
| Lucky | Thai | Surat Thani | ✅ | ✅ | ✅ | ✅ |
| Nampetch | Thai | Surat Thani | — | — | ✅ | ✅ |
| Pa Ting (Don Sak) | Seafood | Don Sak | ✅ | ✅ | ✅ | ✅ |
| Phunisa | Thai | Phunphin | ✅ | ✅ | ✅ | ✅ |
| Roy | Thai | Surat Thani | — | — | — | ✅ |
| Sum Gradang Nga | Thai | Surat Thani | ✅ | ✅ | — | — |
| Yok Kheng | Thai | Surat Thani | ✅ | ✅ | ✅ | ✅ |
| Reference | | | | | | |

== Ubon Ratchathani ==
As of the 2027 Michelin Guide, there are 5 restaurants in Ubon Ratchathani province with a Bib Gourmand rating. Michelin began reviewing restaurants in the province starting in the 2023 guide.

Key
| ✅ | Indicates a restaurant with a Michelin Bib Gourmand designation |
| — | The restaurant did not receive a Bib Gourmand that year |

| Name | Cuisine | Location | 2023 | 2024 | 2025 | 2026 | 2027 |
|---|---|---|---|---|---|---|---|
| Agave | Vietnamese | Ubon Ratchathani | ✅ | ✅ | ✅ | ✅ | ✅ |
| Indochine | Vietnamese | Ubon Ratchathani | ✅ | ✅ | ✅ | — | — |
| Jae Nueang | Vietnamese | Ubon Ratchathani | — | — | — | — | ✅ |
| Kor Lhai Toh | Thai | Ubon Ratchathani | — | — | — | — | ✅ |
| Mok | Thai | Ubon Ratchathani | ✅ | ✅ | ✅ | ✅ | ✅ |
| Pae Araya | Thai | Khong Chiam | ✅ | ✅ | ✅ | — | — |
| Som Tum Jinda | Thai | Ubon Ratchathani | ✅ | ✅ | ✅ | ✅ | ✅ |
| View Mun | Thai | Ubon Ratchathani | ✅ | ✅ | ✅ | — | — |
| Reference | | | | | | | |

== Udon Thani ==
As of the 2027 Michelin Guide, there are 4 restaurants in Udon Thani province with a Bib Gourmand rating. Michelin began reviewing restaurants in the province starting in the 2023 guide.

Key
| ✅ | Indicates a restaurant with a Michelin Bib Gourmand designation |
| — | The restaurant did not receive a Bib Gourmand that year |
| Closed | The restaurant is no longer open |

| Name | Cuisine | Location | 2023 | 2024 | 2025 | 2026 | 2027 |
|---|---|---|---|---|---|---|---|
| Arunee Namnueng | Vietnamese | Udon Thani | ✅ | ✅ | | — | — |
| Kao.Piak.Sen | Vietnamese | Udon Thani | — | ✅ | ✅ | ✅ | ✅ |
| Khao Soi Thai Yai | Thai | Udon Thani | — | — | ✅ | ✅ | ✅ |
| Krua Khun Nid | Thai | Udon Thani | ✅ | ✅ | ✅ | ✅ | — |
| Lab Nua | Thai | Udon Thani | ✅ | ✅ | | — | — |
| Madam Pahtehh | Asian Fusion | Udon Thani | ✅ | ✅ | | — | — |
| Majchapasuk | Thai | Mu Mon | ✅ | ✅ | ✅ | ✅ | — |
| Pad Thai Bua Dang | Thai | Udon Thani | — | — | — | ✅ | ✅ |
| Peng Duck Noodles | Thai | Udon Thani | ✅ | ✅ | ✅ | ✅ | ✅ |
| Samuay & Sons | Vietnamese | Udon Thani | — | ✅ | | Closed | |
| VT Namnueng | Vietnamese | Udon Thani | ✅ | ✅ | | — | — |
| Reference | | | | | | | |

== See also ==
- List of Michelin-starred restaurants in Thailand
- List of Thai restaurants
