= List of Michelin-starred restaurants in Moscow =

As of the 2024 Michelin Guide edition, there are no restaurants in Moscow with a Michelin-star rating. However, as of the last year that the guide was released, 2022, there were nine. The Michelin Guides have been published by the French tire company Michelin since 1900. They were designed as a guide to tell drivers about eateries they recommended to visit and to subtly sponsor their tires, by encouraging drivers to use their cars more and therefore need to replace the tires as they wore out. Over time, the stars that were given out became more valuable.

Multiple anonymous Michelin inspectors visit the restaurants several times. They rate the restaurants on five criteria: "quality of products", "mastery of flavor and cooking techniques", "the personality of the chef represented in the dining experience", "value for money", and "consistency between inspectors' visits". Inspectors have at least ten years of expertise and create a list of popular restaurants supported by media reports, reviews, and diner popularity. If they reach a consensus, Michelin awards restaurants from one to three stars based on its evaluation methodology: One star means "high-quality cooking, worth a stop", two stars signify "excellent cooking, worth a detour", and three stars denote "exceptional cuisine, worth a special journey". The stars are not permanent and restaurants are constantly being reevaluated. If the criteria are not met, the restaurant will lose its stars.

The first edition of the Michelin Guide for Moscow was released in 2021 for the year 2022. It was the first Russian Michelin Guide. The guide was subsequently suspended by Michelin in response to Russia’s invasion of Ukraine in February 2022, with the company specifying that the suspension was unrelated to the chefs' talent. All Russian development projects, social media presence, and online activity were also stopped. In March 2022, it was stated by a Michelin spokesperson that it was too early to make a decision if Russian activities would ever resume. Two-starred restaurants also received green stars for excellence in sustainable gastronomy, Biologie and Twins Garden.

== List ==
Key
1 Michelin star	One Michelin star
2 Michelin stars	Two Michelin stars

Michelin-starred restaurants
Name	Cuisine	2022	2023–2026 No Guide
Artest – Chef’s Table	Modern	2 Michelin stars	
Beluga	Russian	1 Michelin star	
Biologie	Gastronomical	1 Michelin star	
Grand Cru	French	1 Michelin star	
Sakhalin	Seafood	1 Michelin star	
Savva	Modern	1 Michelin star	
Selfie	Gastronomical	1 Michelin star	
Twins Garden	Sustainable	2 Michelin stars	
White Rabbit	Modern	1 Michelin star	
Reference			

== See also ==
- Lists of restaurants
