= List of Michelin-starred restaurants in Doha =

As of the 2026 Michelin Guide, there are 3 restaurants in Doha, Qatar with a Michelin-star rating.

The Michelin Guides have been published by the French tire company Michelin since 1900. They were designed as a guide to tell drivers about eateries they recommended to visit and to subtly sponsor their tires, by encouraging drivers to use their cars more and therefore need to replace the tires as they wore out. Over time, the stars that were given out became more valuable.

Multiple anonymous Michelin inspectors visit the restaurants several times. They rate the restaurants on five criteria: "quality of products", "mastery of flavor and cooking techniques", "the personality of the chef represented in the dining experience", "value for money", and "consistency between inspectors' visits". Inspectors have at least ten years of expertise and create a list of popular restaurants supported by media reports, reviews, and diner popularity. If they reach a consensus, Michelin awards restaurants from one to three stars based on its evaluation methodology: one star means "high-quality cooking, worth a stop", two stars signify "excellent cooking, worth a detour", and three stars denote "exceptional cuisine, worth a special journey". The stars are not permanent and restaurants are constantly re-evaluated. If the criteria are not met, the restaurant will lose its stars.

The first Michelin Guide for Doha, issued as the 2025 list, debuted on December 12, 2024 at the Katara Hall in Doha. It was an invitation exclusive event. The Guide was financially supported by Qatar Tourism.

== List ==
Key
1 Michelin star	One Michelin star
—	The restaurant did not receive a star that year

Michelin-starred restaurants
Name	Cuisine	Location	2025	2026
Alba	Italian	Doha – Marina District	—	1 Michelin star
IDAM by Alain Ducasse	French	Doha – Corniche Promenade	1 Michelin star	1 Michelin star
Jamavar	Indian	Doha – West Bay	1 Michelin star	1 Michelin star
References				

== See also ==
- Lists of restaurants
