= La Degustation =

La Degustation Bohême Bourgeoise
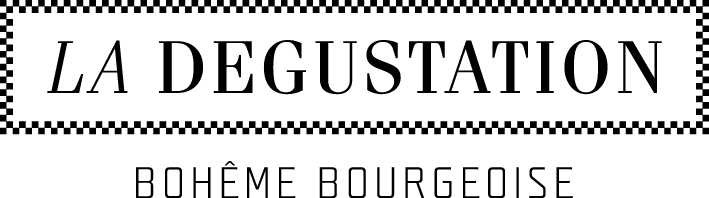

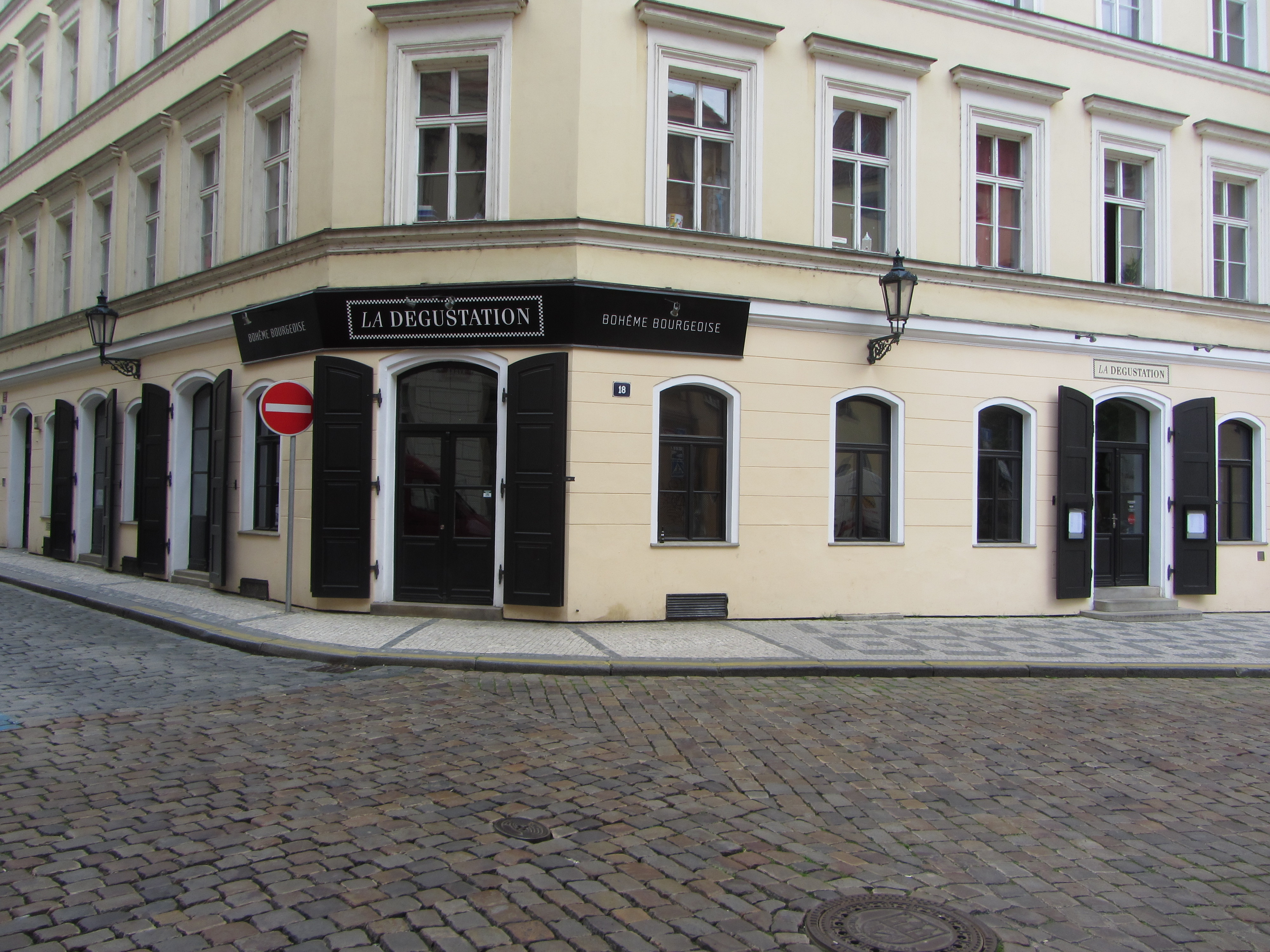
- Interactive map of La Degustation Bohême Bourgeoise

Restaurant information
- Owners: Entrecote, s.r.o.
- Head chef: Oldřich Sahajdák
- Location: Haštalská 18, Prague, 110 00, Czech Republic
- Coordinates: 50°5′27.56″N 14°25′30.42″E
- Website: www.ladegustation.cz

La Degustation Bohême Bourgeoise is a restaurant in Prague, Czech Republic, located on Haštalská Street. The restaurant offers three menus: Czech traditional, Czech-inspired fusion, and pan-European, which can be combined. Part of the Ambiente Group, the restaurant has an open kitchen.

In 2009, it was named as the best restaurant in the Czech Republic, and received the Grand Restaurant 2010 award, presented annually by the Czech Association of Restaurateurs. The restaurant was awarded with a Michelin star in 2012.

Forbes Life called it the "first choice for its buckle-in, three-hour seven-course tasting menus (plus a blizzard of Amuse-bouches)."
