= List of Michelin-starred restaurants in Croatia =

As of the 2026 guide, there are 14 restaurants in Croatia with Michelin stars. 2017 was the first year of the Michelin Guide for Croatia.

The Michelin Guides have been published by the French tire company Michelin since 1900. They were designed as a guide to tell drivers about eateries they recommended to visit and to subtly sponsor their tires, by encouraging drivers to use their cars more and therefore need to replace the tires as they wore out. Over time, the stars that were given out started to become more valuable.

Multiple anonymous Michelin inspectors visit the restaurants several times. They rate the restaurants on five criteria: "quality of products", "mastery of flavor and cooking techniques", "the personality of the chef represented in the dining experience", "value for money", and "consistency between inspectors' visits". Inspectors have at least ten years of expertise and create a list of popular restaurants supported by media reports, reviews, and diner popularity. If they reach a consensus, Michelin awards restaurants from one to three stars based on its evaluation methodology: One star means "high-quality cooking, worth a stop", two stars signify "excellent cooking, worth a detour", and three stars denote "exceptional cuisine, worth a special journey". The stars are not permanent and restaurants are constantly being re-evaluated. If the criteria are not met, the restaurant will lose its stars.

== 2021–2026 list ==
Key
| 1 Michelin star | One Michelin star |
| 2 Michelin stars | Two Michelin stars |
| — | The restaurant did not receive a star that year |

Michelin-starred restaurants
| Name | Cuisine | Location | 2021 | 2022 | 2023 | 2024 | 2025 | 2026 |
|---|---|---|---|---|---|---|---|---|
| Agli Amici Rovinj | Italian | Rovinj | 1 Michelin star | 1 Michelin star | 1 Michelin star | 2 Michelin stars | 2 Michelin stars | 2 Michelin stars |
| Alfred Keller | Modern | Mali Lošinj | 1 Michelin star | 1 Michelin star | 1 Michelin star | 1 Michelin star | 1 Michelin star | 1 Michelin star |
| Boškinac | Creative | Novalja | 1 Michelin star | 1 Michelin star | 1 Michelin star | 1 Michelin star | 1 Michelin star | 1 Michelin star |
| Cap Aureo | Mediterranean | Rovinj | — | — | — | — | 1 Michelin star | 1 Michelin star |
| Draga di Lovrana | French / Italian | Kvarner Gulf | 1 Michelin star | 1 Michelin star | 1 Michelin star | 1 Michelin star | — | — |
| Dubravkin Put | Mediterranean | Zagreb | — | — | — | 1 Michelin star | 1 Michelin star | 1 Michelin star |
| Harry’s Piccolo Poreč | Mediterranean | Poreč | — | — | — | — | — | 1 Michelin star |
| Korak | Contemporary | Jastrebarsko | — | — | 1 Michelin star | 1 Michelin star | 1 Michelin star | 1 Michelin star |
| Krug | Mediterranean | Split | — | — | — | — | 1 Michelin star | 1 Michelin star |
| LD Restaurant | Modern | Korčula | 1 Michelin star | 1 Michelin star | 1 Michelin star | 1 Michelin star | 1 Michelin star | 1 Michelin star |
| Monte | Creative | Rovinj | 1 Michelin star | 1 Michelin star | 1 Michelin star | 1 Michelin star | 1 Michelin star | 1 Michelin star |
| Nebo | Modern | Rijeka | 1 Michelin star | 1 Michelin star | 1 Michelin star | 1 Michelin star | 1 Michelin star | 1 Michelin star |
| Noel | Modern | Zagreb | 1 Michelin star | 1 Michelin star | 1 Michelin star | 1 Michelin star | 1 Michelin star | 1 Michelin star |
| Restaurant 360 | Modern | Dubrovnik | 1 Michelin star | 1 Michelin star | 1 Michelin star | 1 Michelin star | 1 Michelin star | 1 Michelin star |
| Pelegrini | Modern | Šibenik | 1 Michelin star | 1 Michelin star | 1 Michelin star | 1 Michelin star | 1 Michelin star | 1 Michelin star |
| Reference | | | | | | | | |

== 2017–2020 list ==
Key
| 1 Michelin star | One Michelin star |
| — | The restaurant did not receive a star that year |

Michelin-starred restaurants
| Name | Cuisine | Location | 2017 | 2018 | 2019 | 2020 |
|---|---|---|---|---|---|---|
| Boškinac | Creative | Novalja | — | — | — | 1 Michelin star |
| Draga di Lovrana | Italian-French | Kvarner Gulf | — | — | 1 Michelin star | 1 Michelin star |
| LD Terrace | Modern | Korčula | — | — | — | 1 Michelin star |
| Monte | Creative | Rovinj | 1 Michelin star | 1 Michelin star | 1 Michelin star | 1 Michelin star |
| Noel | Modern | Zagreb | — | — | 1 Michelin star | 1 Michelin star |
| Restaurant 360 | Modern | Dubrovnik | — | 1 Michelin star | 1 Michelin star | 1 Michelin star |
| Pelegrini | Modern | Šibenik | — | 1 Michelin star | 1 Michelin star | 1 Michelin star |
| Reference | | | | | | |

== See also ==
- Lists of restaurants
