= List of Michelin-starred restaurants in Monaco =

The annual update of Monaco's Michelin Guide is done simultaneously as France's guide, reflecting the close geographical and cultural ties between the two regions.

As of the 2025 guide, there are 7 restaurants in Monaco with a Michelin-star rating, a rating system used by the Michelin Guide to grade restaurants based on their quality.

== List ==
Key
1 Michelin star	One Michelin star
2 Michelin stars	Two Michelin stars
3 Michelin stars	Three Michelin stars
—	The restaurant did not receive a star that year
Closed	The restaurant is no longer open

Michelin-starred restaurants
Name	Cuisine	Ward	2022	2023	2024	2025	2026
Blue Bay Marcel Ravin	Contemporary	Larvotto	2 Michelin stars	2 Michelin stars	2 Michelin stars	2 Michelin stars	2 Michelin stars
L'Abysse Monte-Carlo	Japanese	Monte Carlo	—	—	—	2 Michelin stars	2 Michelin stars
Elsa Marcel Ravin	Mediterranean	Monte Carlo	—	—	—	—	1 Michelin star
La Table d'Antonio Salvatore	Italian	Monte Carlo	1 Michelin star	1 Michelin star	1 Michelin star	1 Michelin star	1 Michelin star
Le Grill	French	Monte Carlo	1 Michelin star	1 Michelin star	1 Michelin star	1 Michelin star	1 Michelin star
Le Louis XV	Mediterranean	Monte Carlo	3 Michelin stars	3 Michelin stars	3 Michelin stars	3 Michelin stars	3 Michelin stars
Le Vistamar	Seafood	Monte Carlo	1 Michelin star	Closed			
Les Ambassadeurs	Mediterranean	Monte Carlo	—	—	2 Michelin stars	2 Michelin stars	2 Michelin stars
Pavyllon Monaco	Contemporary	Monte Carlo	—	1 Michelin star	1 Michelin star	1 Michelin star	1 Michelin star
Robuchon Monaco	Modern	Monte Carlo	—	—	—	—	1 Michelin star
Yoshi	Japanese	Monte Carlo	1 Michelin star	1 Michelin star	1 Michelin star	—	—
Source							

== See also ==
- List of Michelin-starred restaurants in France
- Lists of restaurants
