= List of Michelin-starred restaurants in Portugal =

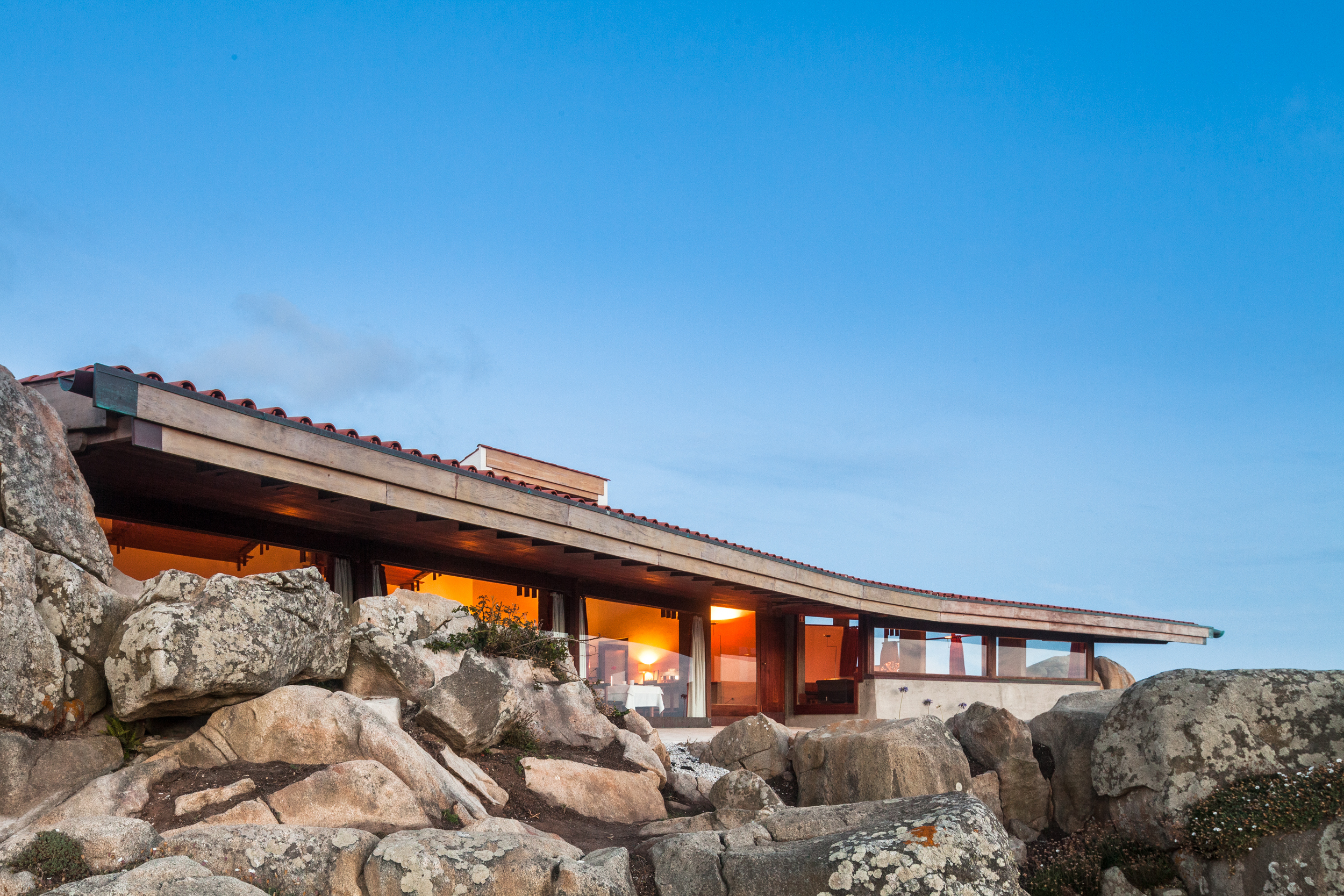
Casa de Chá da Boa Nova, a restaurant with two Michelin stars in Leça da Palmeira, Portugal

As of the 2026 guide, there are 53 restaurants in Portugal that hold a Michelin star.

Historically, Portugal shared a Michelin Guide with Spain, however beginning in 2024, Portugal received its first-ever dedicated Michelin Guide.

Multiple anonymous Michelin inspectors visit the restaurants several times. They rate the restaurants on five criteria: "quality of products", "mastery of flavor and cooking techniques", "the personality of the chef represented in the dining experience", "value for money", and "consistency between inspectors' visits". Inspectors have at least ten years of expertise and create a list of popular restaurants supported by media reports, reviews, and diner popularity. If they reach a consensus, Michelin awards restaurants from one to three stars based on its evaluation methodology: one star means "high-quality cooking, worth a stop", two stars signify "excellent cooking, worth a detour", and three stars denote "exceptional cuisine, worth a special journey". The stars are not permanent and restaurants are constantly re-evaluated. If the criteria are not met, the restaurant will lose its stars.

== 2021–2026 list ==
Key
1 Michelin star	One Michelin star
2 Michelin stars	Two Michelin stars
—	The restaurant did not receive a star that year
Closed	The restaurant is no longer open

Michelin-starred restaurants
Name	Cuisine	Location	2021	2022	2023	2024	2025	2026
100 Maneiras	Creative	Lisbon	1 Michelin star	1 Michelin star	1 Michelin star	1 Michelin star	—	—
2Monkeys	Creative	Lisbon	—	—	—	1 Michelin star	1 Michelin star	1 Michelin star
A Cozinha	Modern	Guimarães	1 Michelin star	1 Michelin star	1 Michelin star	1 Michelin star	1 Michelin star	1 Michelin star
A Cozinha do Paço	Creative	Évora	—	—	—	—	—	1 Michelin star
Al Sud	Creative	Lagos	—	1 Michelin star	1 Michelin star	1 Michelin star	1 Michelin star	Closed
Alameda	Modern	Faro	—	—	—	—	—	1 Michelin star
Alma	Creative	Lisbon	2 Michelin stars	2 Michelin stars	2 Michelin stars	2 Michelin stars	2 Michelin stars	Closed
Antiqvvm	Creative	Porto	1 Michelin star	1 Michelin star	1 Michelin star	2 Michelin stars	2 Michelin stars	2 Michelin stars
Arkhe	Vegetarian	Lisbon	—	—	—	—	1 Michelin star	Closed
A Ver Tavira	Modern	Tavira	—	1 Michelin star	1 Michelin star	1 Michelin star	1 Michelin star	1 Michelin star
Belcanto	Creative	Lisbon	2 Michelin stars	2 Michelin stars	2 Michelin stars	2 Michelin stars	2 Michelin stars	2 Michelin stars
Blind	Creative	Porto	—	—	—	—	1 Michelin star	1 Michelin star
Bon Bon	Modern	Carvoeiro	1 Michelin star	1 Michelin star	1 Michelin star	1 Michelin star	1 Michelin star	1 Michelin star
Casa de Chá da Boa Nova	Seafood	Leça da Palmeira	2 Michelin stars	2 Michelin stars	2 Michelin stars	2 Michelin stars	2 Michelin stars	2 Michelin stars
CURA	Modern	Lisbon	—	1 Michelin star	1 Michelin star	1 Michelin star	1 Michelin star	1 Michelin star
Desarma	Contemporary	Funchal	—	—	—	1 Michelin star	1 Michelin star	1 Michelin star
dop	Contemporary	Porto	—	—	—	—	—	1 Michelin star
Eleven	Creative	Lisbon	1 Michelin star	1 Michelin star	1 Michelin star	1 Michelin star	1 Michelin star	—
Encanto	Vegetarian	Lisbon	—	—	1 Michelin star	1 Michelin star	1 Michelin star	1 Michelin star
Eneko Lisboa	Japanese	Lisbon	1 Michelin star	1 Michelin star	1 Michelin star	Closed		
Éon	Modern	Porto	—	—	—	—	—	1 Michelin star
EPUR	Creative	Lisbon	1 Michelin star	1 Michelin star	1 Michelin star	1 Michelin star	1 Michelin star	1 Michelin star
Euskalduna Studio	Modern	Porto	—	—	1 Michelin star	1 Michelin star	1 Michelin star	1 Michelin star
Feitoria	Modern	Lisbon	1 Michelin star	1 Michelin star	1 Michelin star	1 Michelin star	1 Michelin star	1 Michelin star
Fifty Seconds	Creative	Lisbon	1 Michelin star	1 Michelin star	1 Michelin star	1 Michelin star	1 Michelin star	2 Michelin stars
Fortaleza do Guincho	Modern	Cascais	1 Michelin star	1 Michelin star	1 Michelin star	1 Michelin star	1 Michelin star	1 Michelin star
G Pousada	Regional	Bragança	1 Michelin star	1 Michelin star	1 Michelin star	1 Michelin star	1 Michelin star	1 Michelin star
Gastro by Elemento	Contemporary	Porto	—	—	—	—	—	1 Michelin star
Grenache	French contemporary	Lisbon	—	—	—	—	1 Michelin star	1 Michelin star
Gusto by Heinz Beck	Mediterranean	Almancil	1 Michelin star	1 Michelin star	1 Michelin star	1 Michelin star	1 Michelin star	1 Michelin star
Herdade do Esporão	Contemporary	Reguengos de Monsaraz	—	1 Michelin star	1 Michelin star	1 Michelin star	1 Michelin star	1 Michelin star
Henrique Sá Pessoa	Creative	Lisbon	—	—	—	—	—	2 Michelin stars
Il Gallo d'Oro	Modern	Funchal	2 Michelin stars	2 Michelin stars	2 Michelin stars	2 Michelin stars	2 Michelin stars	2 Michelin stars
IN Diferente	Contemporary	Porto	—	—	—	—	—	1 Michelin star
Kabuki Lisboa	Japanese	Lisbon	—	—	1 Michelin star	1 Michelin star	1 Michelin star	1 Michelin star
Kanazawa	Japanese	Lisbon	—	—	1 Michelin star	1 Michelin star	1 Michelin star	1 Michelin star
Kappo	Japanese	Cascais	—	—	—	—	—	1 Michelin star
LAB by Sergi Arola	Creative	Sintra	1 Michelin star	1 Michelin star	1 Michelin star	1 Michelin star	1 Michelin star	1 Michelin star
Largo do Paço	Modern	Amarante	1 Michelin star	1 Michelin star	1 Michelin star	—	—	1 Michelin star
Le Monument	Contemporary	Porto	—	—	1 Michelin star	1 Michelin star	1 Michelin star	1 Michelin star
Loco	Modern	Lisbon	1 Michelin star	1 Michelin star	1 Michelin star	1 Michelin star	1 Michelin star	1 Michelin star
MAPA	Contemporary	Montemor-o-Novo	—	—	—	—	—	1 Michelin star
Marlene,	Modern	Lisbon	—	—	—	—	1 Michelin star	1 Michelin star
Mesa de Lemos	Creative	Silgueiros, Viseu	1 Michelin star	1 Michelin star	1 Michelin star	1 Michelin star	1 Michelin star	1 Michelin star
Midori	Japanese	Sintra	1 Michelin star	1 Michelin star	1 Michelin star	1 Michelin star	1 Michelin star	1 Michelin star
Ó Balcão	Modern	Santarém	—	—	—	1 Michelin star	1 Michelin star	1 Michelin star
Ocean	Creative	Alporchinhos, Porches	2 Michelin stars	2 Michelin stars	2 Michelin stars	2 Michelin stars	2 Michelin stars	2 Michelin stars
Oculto	Modern	Vila do Conde	—	—	—	—	1 Michelin star	1 Michelin star
Palatial	Contemporary	Braga	—	—	—	—	1 Michelin star	1 Michelin star
Pedro Lemos	Modern	Porto	1 Michelin star	1 Michelin star	1 Michelin star	1 Michelin star	1 Michelin star	1 Michelin star
SÁLA de João Sá	Modern	Lisbon	—	—	—	1 Michelin star	1 Michelin star	1 Michelin star
Schistó	Contemporary	Peso da Régua	—	—	—	—	—	1 Michelin star
Vila Joya	Modern	Galé, Albufeira	2 Michelin stars	2 Michelin stars	2 Michelin stars	2 Michelin stars	2 Michelin stars	2 Michelin stars
Vila Foz Restaurante	Contemporary	Porto	—	1 Michelin star	1 Michelin star	1 Michelin star	1 Michelin star	1 Michelin star
Vinha	Portuguese	Vila Nova de Gaia	—	—	—	—	1 Michelin star	1 Michelin star
Vista	Modern	Portimão	1 Michelin star	1 Michelin star	1 Michelin star	1 Michelin star	1 Michelin star	1 Michelin star
Vistas		Vila Nova de Cacela	1 Michelin star	1 Michelin star	1 Michelin star	—	—	—
William	Contemporary	Funchal	1 Michelin star	1 Michelin star	1 Michelin star	1 Michelin star	1 Michelin star	1 Michelin star
The Yeatman Gastronomic Restaurant	Creative	Vila Nova de Gaia	2 Michelin stars	2 Michelin stars	2 Michelin stars	2 Michelin stars	2 Michelin stars	2 Michelin stars
YŌSO	Japanese	Lisbon	—	—	—	—	1 Michelin star	1 Michelin star
Reference								

== 2014–2020 list ==
Key
1 Michelin star	One Michelin star
2 Michelin stars	Two Michelin stars
—	The restaurant did not receive a star that year

Michelin-starred restaurants
Name	Cuisine	Location	2014	2015	2016	2017	2018	2019	2020
A Cozinha	Modern	Guimarães	—	—	—	—	—	1 Michelin star	1 Michelin star
Alma	Creative	Lisbon	—	—	—	1 Michelin star	1 Michelin star	2 Michelin stars	2 Michelin stars
Antiqvvm	Creative	Porto	—	—	—	1 Michelin star	1 Michelin star	1 Michelin star	1 Michelin star
Belcanto	Creative	Lisbon	1 Michelin star	2 Michelin stars	2 Michelin stars	2 Michelin stars	2 Michelin stars	2 Michelin stars	2 Michelin stars
Bon Bon	Modern	Carvoeiro	—	—	1 Michelin star	1 Michelin star	1 Michelin star	1 Michelin star	1 Michelin star
Casa de Chá da Boa Nova	Seafood	Leça da Palmeira	—	—	—	1 Michelin star	1 Michelin star	1 Michelin star	2 Michelin stars
Eleven	Creative	Lisbon	1 Michelin star	1 Michelin star	1 Michelin star	1 Michelin star	1 Michelin star	1 Michelin star	1 Michelin star
EPUR	Creative	Lisbon	—	—	—	—	—	—	1 Michelin star
Feitoria	Modern	Lisbon	1 Michelin star	1 Michelin star	1 Michelin star	1 Michelin star	1 Michelin star	1 Michelin star	1 Michelin star
Fifty Seconds	Creative	Lisbon	—	—	—	—	—	—	1 Michelin star
Fortaleza do Guincho	Modern	Cascais	1 Michelin star	1 Michelin star	1 Michelin star	1 Michelin star	1 Michelin star	1 Michelin star	1 Michelin star
G Pousada	Regional	Bragança	—	—	—	—	—	1 Michelin star	1 Michelin star
Gusto by Heinz Beck	Mediterranean	Almancil	—	—	—	—	1 Michelin star	1 Michelin star	1 Michelin star
Henrique Leis		Almancil	1 Michelin star	1 Michelin star	1 Michelin star	1 Michelin star	1 Michelin star	1 Michelin star	—
Il Gallo d'Oro	Modern	Funchal	1 Michelin star	1 Michelin star	1 Michelin star	2 Michelin stars	2 Michelin stars	2 Michelin stars	2 Michelin stars
L'AND Vineyards		Montemor-o-Novo	1 Michelin star	1 Michelin star	—	1 Michelin star	1 Michelin star	1 Michelin star	—
LAB by Sergi Arola	Creative	Sintra	—	—	—	1 Michelin star	1 Michelin star	1 Michelin star	1 Michelin star
Largo do Paço	Modern	Amarante	1 Michelin star	1 Michelin star	1 Michelin star	1 Michelin star	1 Michelin star	1 Michelin star	1 Michelin star
Loco	Modern	Lisbon	—	—	—	1 Michelin star	1 Michelin star	1 Michelin star	1 Michelin star
Mesa de Lemos	Creative	Silgueiros, Viseu	—	—	—	—	—	—	1 Michelin star
Midori	Japanese	Sintra	—	—	—	—	—	1 Michelin star	1 Michelin star
Ocean	Creative	Alporchinhos, Porches	2 Michelin stars	2 Michelin stars	2 Michelin stars	2 Michelin stars	2 Michelin stars	2 Michelin stars	2 Michelin stars
Pedro Lemos	Modern	Porto	—	1 Michelin star	1 Michelin star	1 Michelin star	1 Michelin star	1 Michelin star	1 Michelin star
São Gabriel		Almancil	—	1 Michelin star	1 Michelin star	1 Michelin star	1 Michelin star	1 Michelin star	1 Michelin star
Vila Joya	Modern	Galé, Albufeira	2 Michelin stars	2 Michelin stars	2 Michelin stars	2 Michelin stars	2 Michelin stars	2 Michelin stars	2 Michelin stars
Vista	Modern	Portimão	—	—	—	—	1 Michelin star	1 Michelin star	1 Michelin star
Vistas		Vila Nova de Cacela	—	—	—	—	—	—	1 Michelin star
William	Contemporary	Funchal	—	—	—	1 Michelin star	1 Michelin star	1 Michelin star	1 Michelin star
Willie's		Vilamoura	1 Michelin star	1 Michelin star	1 Michelin star	1 Michelin star	1 Michelin star	1 Michelin star	—
The Yeatman Gastronomic Restaurant	Creative	Vila Nova de Gaia	1 Michelin star	1 Michelin star	1 Michelin star	2 Michelin stars	2 Michelin stars	2 Michelin stars	2 Michelin stars
Reference									

== 1936–1938 list ==
Michelin-starred restaurants
Name	Cuisine	Location	1936–1938
Avenida		Lisbon	1 Michelin star
Chave d'Ouro		Lisbon	1 Michelin star
Clube Naval		Setúbal	1 Michelin star
Escondidinho		Porto	2 Michelin stars
Pettermann		Lisbon	1 Michelin star
Reference			

== See also ==
- Michelin Guide
- List of Michelin-starred restaurants in Spain
- Lists of restaurants
