= List of Michelin-starred restaurants in Vietnam =

As of the 2026 guide, there are 11 restaurants in Vietnam with a Michelin-star rating, a rating system used by the Michelin Guide to grade restaurants based on their quality.

The 2023 edition was the inaugural edition of the Michelin Guide in Vietnam, covering Hanoi and Ho Chi Minh City.

Multiple anonymous Michelin inspectors visit the restaurants several times. They rate the restaurants on five criteria: "quality of products", "mastery of flavor and cooking techniques", "the personality of the chef represented in the dining experience", "value for money", and "consistency between inspectors' visits". Inspectors have at least ten years of expertise and create a list of popular restaurants supported by media reports, reviews, and diner popularity. If they reach a consensus, Michelin awards restaurants from one to three stars based on its evaluation methodology: One star means "high-quality cooking, worth a stop", two stars signify "excellent cooking, worth a detour", and three stars denote "exceptional cuisine, worth a special journey". The stars are not permanent and restaurants are constantly being re-evaluated. If the criteria are not met, the restaurant will lose its stars.

== List ==
Key
1 Michelin star	One Michelin star
—	The restaurant did not receive a star that year

Michelin-starred restaurants
Name	Cuisine	Location	2023	2024	2025	2026
Akuna	Innovative	Ho Chi Minh – Bến Nghé	—	1 Michelin star	1 Michelin star	1 Michelin star
Anan Saigon	Vietnamese	Ho Chi Minh – Bến Nghé	1 Michelin star	1 Michelin star	1 Michelin star	1 Michelin star
CieL	Innovative	Ho Chi Minh City – Thu Duc City	—	—	1 Michelin star	1 Michelin star
Coco Dining	Innovative	Ho Chi Minh City – Vo Thi Sau	—	—	1 Michelin star	1 Michelin star
Hibana by Koki	Japanese	Hanoi – Hoàn Kiếm	1 Michelin star	1 Michelin star	1 Michelin star	1 Michelin star
Gia	Vietnamese	Hanoi – Đống Đa	1 Michelin star	1 Michelin star	1 Michelin star	1 Michelin star
La Maison 1888	French	Da Nang	—	1 Michelin star	1 Michelin star	1 Michelin star
Long Trieu (Note: Was named The Royal Pavilion until 2024)	Cantonese	Ho Chi Minh – Bến Nghé	—	1 Michelin star	1 Michelin star	1 Michelin star
ONVIT	Korean	Hanoi – Yen Hoa	—	—	—	1 Michelin star
Tầm Vị	Vietnamese	Hanoi – Ba Đình	1 Michelin star	1 Michelin star	1 Michelin star	1 Michelin star
Upstairs	Vietnamese	Ho Chi Minh City – An Khanh	—	—	—	1 Michelin star
Reference						

== See also ==
- List of Vietnamese restaurants
