= List of Michelin-starred restaurants in Switzerland =

As of the 2024 Michelin Guide, there are 136 restaurants in Switzerland with a Michelin star rating. The Michelin Guides have been published by the French tire company Michelin since 1900. They were designed as a guide to tell drivers about eateries they recommended to visit and to subtly sponsor their tires, by encouraging drivers to use their cars more and therefore need to replace the tires as they wore out. Over time, the stars that were given out became more valuable.

Multiple anonymous Michelin inspectors visit the restaurants several times. They rate the restaurants on five criteria: "quality of products", "mastery of flavor and cooking techniques", "the personality of the chef represented in the dining experience", "value for money", and "consistency between inspectors' visits". Inspectors have at least ten years of expertise and create a list of popular restaurants supported by media reports, reviews, and diner popularity. If they reach a consensus, Michelin awards restaurants from one to three stars based on its evaluation methodology: one star means "high-quality cooking, worth a stop", two stars signify "excellent cooking, worth a detour", and three stars denote "exceptional cuisine, worth a special journey". The stars are not permanent and restaurants are constantly re-evaluated. If the criteria are not met, the restaurant will lose its stars.

== Aargau ==
As of the 2024 Michelin Guide, there are 2 restaurants in Appenzell Ausserrhoden with a Michelin star rating.

Key
1 Michelin star	One Michelin star

Michelin-starred restaurants
Name	Location	2024
Fahr	Künten	1 Michelin star
Skin's	Lenzburg	2 Michelin stars
References		

== Appenzell Ausserrhoden ==
As of the 2024 Michelin Guide, there are 2 restaurants in Appenzell Ausserrhoden with a Michelin star rating.

Key
1 Michelin star	One Michelin star

Michelin-starred restaurants
Name	Location	2024
Gasthaus Zum Gupf	Rehetobel	1 Michelin star
Truube	Gais	1 Michelin star
References		

== Appenzell Innerrhoden ==
As of the 2024 Michelin Guide, there are no restaurants in Appenzell Innerrhoden with a Michelin star rating.

== Basel-Landschaft ==
As of the 2024 Michelin Guide, there are 2 restaurants in Basel-Landschaft with a Michelin star rating.

Key
1 Michelin star	One Michelin star

Michelin-starred restaurants
Name	Location	2024
Le Murenburg	Bubendorf	1 Michelin star
Schlüssel	Oberwil	1 Michelin star
References		

== Bern ==
As of the 2024 Michelin Guide, there are 1o restaurants in Bern with a Michelin star rating.

Key
1 Michelin star	One Michelin star

Michelin-starred restaurants
Name	Location	2024
Auberge de la Croix Blanche	Villarepos	1 Michelin star
Aux Trois Amis	Ligerz	1 Michelin star
Des Trois Tours	Fribourg	1 Michelin star
Le Pérolles	Fribourg	1 Michelin star
Panorama - Cayenne	Steffisburg	1 Michelin star
Sonne	Wengi	1 Michelin star
Steinhalle	Bern	1 Michelin star
Wein & Sein	Bern	1 Michelin star
ZOE	Bern	1 Michelin star
Zur Gedult	Burgdorf	1 Michelin star
References		

== Graubünden ==
As of the 2024 Michelin Guide, there are 11 restaurants in Graubünden with a Michelin star rating.

Key
1 Michelin star	One Michelin star
2 Michelin stars	Two Michelin stars
3 Michelin stars	Three Michelin stars

Michelin-starred restaurants
Name	Location	2024
7132 Silver	Vals	2 Michelin stars
Chesa Stüva Colani	Madulain	1 Michelin star
Da Vittorio – St. Moritz	Saint Moritz	2 Michelin stars
Ecco St. Moritz	Saint Moritz	2 Michelin stars
Krone	Saint Moritz	1 Michelin star
LA CHAVALLERA in der Krone – Säumerei am Inn	La Punt-Chamues-ch	1 Michelin star
La Brezza	Arosa	2 Michelin stars
La Riva	Lenzerheide	1 Michelin star
OZ	Fürstenau	1 Michelin star
Schloss Schauenstein	Fürstenau	3 Michelin stars
Vivanda	Brail	1 Michelin star
References		

== Schaffhausen ==
As of the 2024 Michelin Guide, there is 1 restaurants in Schaffhausen with a Michelin star rating.

Key
1 Michelin star	One Michelin star

Michelin-starred restaurants
Name	Location	2024
Villa Sommerlust	Schaffhausen	1 Michelin star
References		

== Solothurn ==
As of the 2024 Michelin Guide, there are 11 restaurants in Graubünden with a Michelin star rating.

Key
1 Michelin star	One Michelin star

Michelin-starred restaurants
Name	Location	2024
Château Attisholz - Le feu	Riedholz	1 Michelin star
Traube	Trimbach	1 Michelin star
Wirtshaus Zur Säge	Flüh	1 Michelin star
References		

== Ticino ==
As of the 2024 Michelin Guide, there are 8 restaurants in Ticino with a Michelin star rating.

Key
1 Michelin star	One Michelin star
2 Michelin stars	Two Michelin stars

Michelin-starred restaurants
Name	Location	2024
I Due Sud	Lugano	1 Michelin star
La Brezza	Ascona	2 Michelin stars
Locanda Barbarossa	Ascona	1 Michelin star
Locanda Orico	Bellinzona	1 Michelin star
META	Lugano	1 Michelin star
Osteria dell'Enoteca	Losone	1 Michelin star
Osteria Enoteca Cuntitt	Castel San Pietro	1 Michelin star
THE VIEW	Lugano	1 Michelin star
References		

== Vaud ==
As of the 2024 Michelin Guide, there are10 restaurants in Vaud with a Michelin star rating.

Key
1 Michelin star	One Michelin star
2 Michelin stars	Two Michelin stars
3 Michelin stars	Three Michelin stars

Michelin-starred restaurants
Name	Location	2024
La Table du Lausanne Palace	Lausanne	2 Michelin stars
La Table du Valrose	Rougemont	2 Michelin stars
Le Berceau des Sens	Lausanne	1 Michelin star
Njørden	Aubonne	1 Michelin star
Pic Beau-Rivage Palace	Lausanne	2 Michelin stars
Restaurant de l'Hôtel de Ville	Crissier	3 Michelin stars
Restaurant de l'Hôtel de Ville	Ollon	1 Michelin star
Restaurant GERBER WYSS	Yverdon-les-Bains	1 Michelin star
Stéphane Décotterd	Montreux	1 Michelin star
Table de Mary	Cheseaux-Noréaz	1 Michelin star
References		

== See also ==
- List of restaurants in Switzerland
