= List of Michelin Bib Gourmand restaurants in New Zealand =

As of the 2026 Michelin Guide, a total of 35 restaurants in New Zealand have a Michelin Bib Gourmand recognition.

The Michelin Guides have been published by the French tire company Michelin since 1900. They were designed as a guide to tell drivers about eateries they recommended to visit and to subtly sponsor their tires, by encouraging drivers to use their cars more and therefore need to replace the tires as they wore out. The Michelin Bib Gourmand designation debuted internationally in 1997 and highlights restaurants offering "exceptionally good food at moderate prices". They must offer menu items priced below a maximum determined by local economic standards.

Per Michelin's own rating system, the Bib Gourmand is considered "Not quite a star, but most definitely not a consolation prize" and a "just-as-esteemed rating." As with Michelin stars, restaurants can also lose their Bib Gourmand designation. Bib Gourmand restaurants are assessed often by Michelin's inspectors, and must meet the required standards to remain on the list.

Michelin announced its intention to produce a guide for New Zealand in November 2025, with the inaugural list debuting on June 30, 2026. The guide is Michelin's first in Oceania, covering the cities of Auckland, Wellington, Christchurch and Queenstown.

== North Island ==
As of the 2026 Michelin Guide, there are 17 restaurants on the North Island with a Bib Gourmand rating.

Key
✅	Indicates a restaurant with a Michelin Bib Gourmand designation

Name	Cuisine	Location	2026
1154 Pastaria	Italian	Wellington	✅
Apero Food & Wine	French	Auckland	✅
Atelier	French	Auckland	✅
Bistro Saine	French	Auckland	✅
Boda	Korean	Auckland	✅
Bianca	New Zealand	Auckland	✅
Cazador	New Zealand	Auckland	✅
Cicio Cacio	Italian	Wellington	✅
Gemmayze Street	Lebanese	Auckland	✅
Goat	Indian	Auckland	✅
Hummingbird	French / Italian	Wellington	✅
Indian Alley	Indian	Wellington	✅
Milenta	Colombian	Auckland	✅
Osteria Uno	Italian	Auckland	✅
Parro	Spanish	Auckland	✅
Pasta & Cuore	Italian	Auckland	✅
Tempero	Brazilian	Auckland	✅
Reference(s)			

== South Island ==
As of the 2026 Michelin Guide, there are 18 restaurants on the South Island with a Bib Gourmand rating.

Key
✅	Indicates a restaurant with a Michelin Bib Gourmand designation

Name	Cuisine	Location	2026
A'mano	Italian	Christchurch	✅
Aosta	Italian	Arrowtown	✅
Bombay Palace (Wānaka)	Indian	Wānaka	✅
Earl	European	Christchurch	✅
Fire and Slice	Italian	Christchurch	✅
Francesca	Italian	Wānaka	✅
Gatherings	New Zealand	Christchurch	✅
Londo	British	Christchurch	✅
Muttonbird	New Zealand	Wānaka	✅
Odeon	Mediterranean	Christchurch	✅
Paloma Taqueria	Mexican	Wānaka	✅
Roca	Mediterranean	Christchurch	✅
Soul Quarter	Southern	Christchurch	✅
Sundays	Italian	Queenstown	✅
The Athens Yacht Club	Greek	Christchurch	✅
The Cow (Queenstown)	Italian	Queenstown	✅
The Monday Room	New Zealand	Christchurch	✅
Treehouse	New Zealand	Christchurch	✅
Reference(s)			

== See also ==
- List of Michelin-starred restaurants in New Zealand
