= List of Michelin-starred restaurants in New Zealand =

As of the 2026 Michelin Guide, there are 15 restaurants in New Zealand with a Michelin star rating.

The Michelin Guides have been published by the French tire company Michelin since 1900. They were designed as a guide to tell drivers about eateries they recommended to visit and to subtly sponsor their tires, by encouraging drivers to use their cars more and therefore need to replace the tires as they wore out. Over time, the stars that were given out became more valuable.

Multiple anonymous Michelin inspectors visit the restaurants several times. They rate the restaurants on five criteria: "quality of products", "mastery of flavour and cooking techniques", "the personality of the chef represented in the dining experience", "value for money", and "consistency between inspectors' visits". Inspectors have at least ten years of expertise and create a list of popular restaurants supported by media reports, reviews, and diner popularity. If they reach a consensus, Michelin awards restaurants from one to three stars based on its evaluation methodology: one star means "high-quality cooking, worth a stop", two stars signify "excellent cooking, worth a detour", and three stars denote "exceptional cuisine, worth a special journey". The stars are not permanent and restaurants are constantly re-evaluated. If the criteria are not met, the restaurant will lose its stars.

Michelin announced its intention to produce a guide for New Zealand in November 2025, with the inaugural list debuting on June 30, 2026. The guide is Michelin's first in Oceania, covering the cities of Auckland, Wellington, Christchurch and Queenstown.

== Lists ==
Key
1 Michelin star	One Michelin star
2 Michelin stars	Two Michelin stars

Michelin-starred restaurants
Name	Cuisine	Location	2026
Ahi.	New Zealand	Auckland	1 Michelin star
Amisfield	Innovative	Queenstown	1 Michelin star
Essence	European	Queenstown	2 Michelin stars
Inati	British	Christchurch	1 Michelin star
Jano Bistro	French	Wellington	1 Michelin star
Kika	New Zealand	Wānaka	1 Michelin star
Logan Brown	New Zealand	Wellington	1 Michelin star
Mudbrick	Indian / New Zealand	Waiheke Island	1 Michelin star
Ortega	Seafood	Wellington	1 Michelin star
Paris Butter	New Zealand	Auckland	1 Michelin star
Rātā	New Zealand	Queenstown	1 Michelin star
Sherwood	New Zealand	Queenstown	1 Michelin star
Tala	Samoan	Auckland	1 Michelin star
The Estate	New Zealand	Waiheke Island	1 Michelin star
Tussock Hill	New Zealand	Christchurch	1 Michelin star
Reference(s)			

== See also ==
- List of Michelin Bib Gourmand restaurants in New Zealand
- New Zealand cuisine
