= Viimsi =

Borough in Estonia

- Small borough
- Viimsi

- Location in Estonia
- Coordinates: 59°29′59″N 24°50′1″E
- Country: Estonia
- County: Harju County
- Municipality: Viimsi Parish
- First mentioned: 1471

Population (2021 Census)
  - Total: 2,703

Viimsi (German: Wiems) is a small borough (Estonian: alevik) in Harju County, Estonia, about 9 km (6 mi) northeast of the centre of Tallinn, just north of Tallinn's subdistrict Merivälja. Viimsi is the administrative centre of Viimsi Parish. As of the 2021 census, its population was 2,703.

Viimsi Manor, which was established by St. Brigitta Nunnery (in Pirita), was first mentioned in 1471 as Wiems. After the Great Northern War, the manor had multiple owners, among them the Stenbock, Buxhoeveden, Maydell and Schottländer families. After the dispossession in 1919 the manor was given to the commander-in-chief of the Estonian Army, General Johan Laidoner, who owned it until 1940. During World War II, it was used by the Red Army. Since 2001, the building has housed the National War Museum of Estonia (also the Museum of General Laidoner).

Former Prime Minister Siim Kallas was municipal mayor of Viimsi between 2017 and 2019.
