= Pirita (disambiguation) =

Pirita is a district (linnaosa) of Tallinn, Estonia.

Pirita may also refer to:

- Pirita (subdistrict), a subdistrict (asum) of Pirita district
- Pirita River, a river in northern Estonia
- Pîrîta, a commune in Dubăsari district, Moldova
- Pirita, a village in Zlatna town, Alba County, Romania
- Pirita, Karjalan tytär, a historical novel by Finnish author Kaari Utrio
- Ripogonum scandens, a New Zealand native vine, sometimes called "Pirita"
