= Lepiku, Tallinn =

Subdistrict of Tallinn, Estonia

Coordinates: 59.479408°N 24.883797°E

Lepiku
- Subdistrict of Tallinn
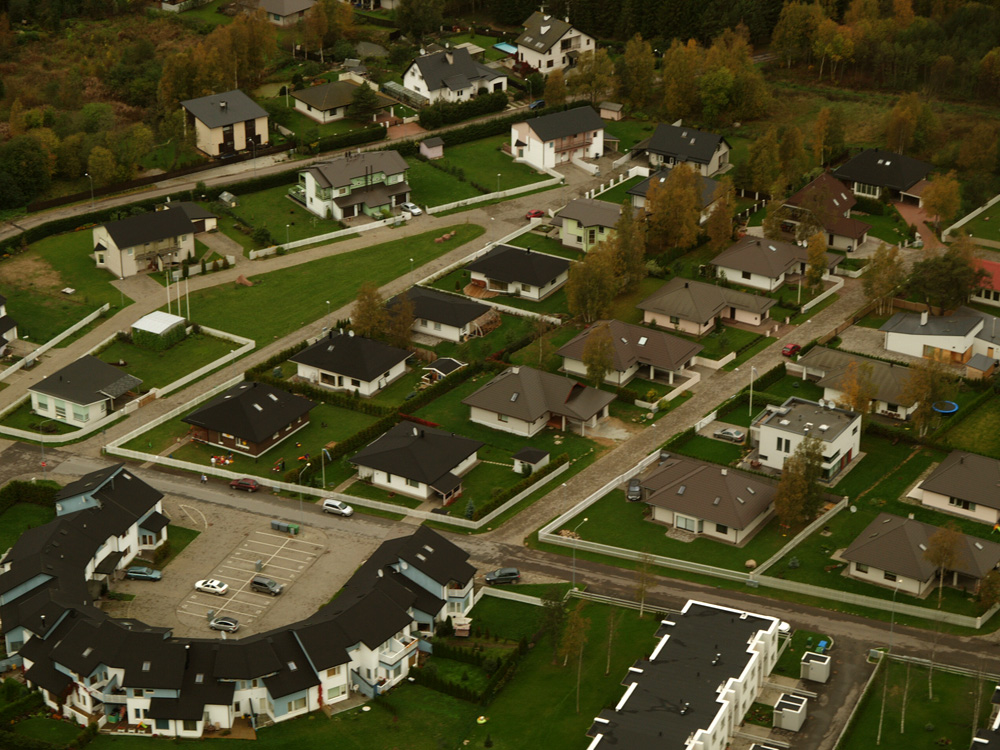
- View at Lepiku from Tallinn TV Tower.

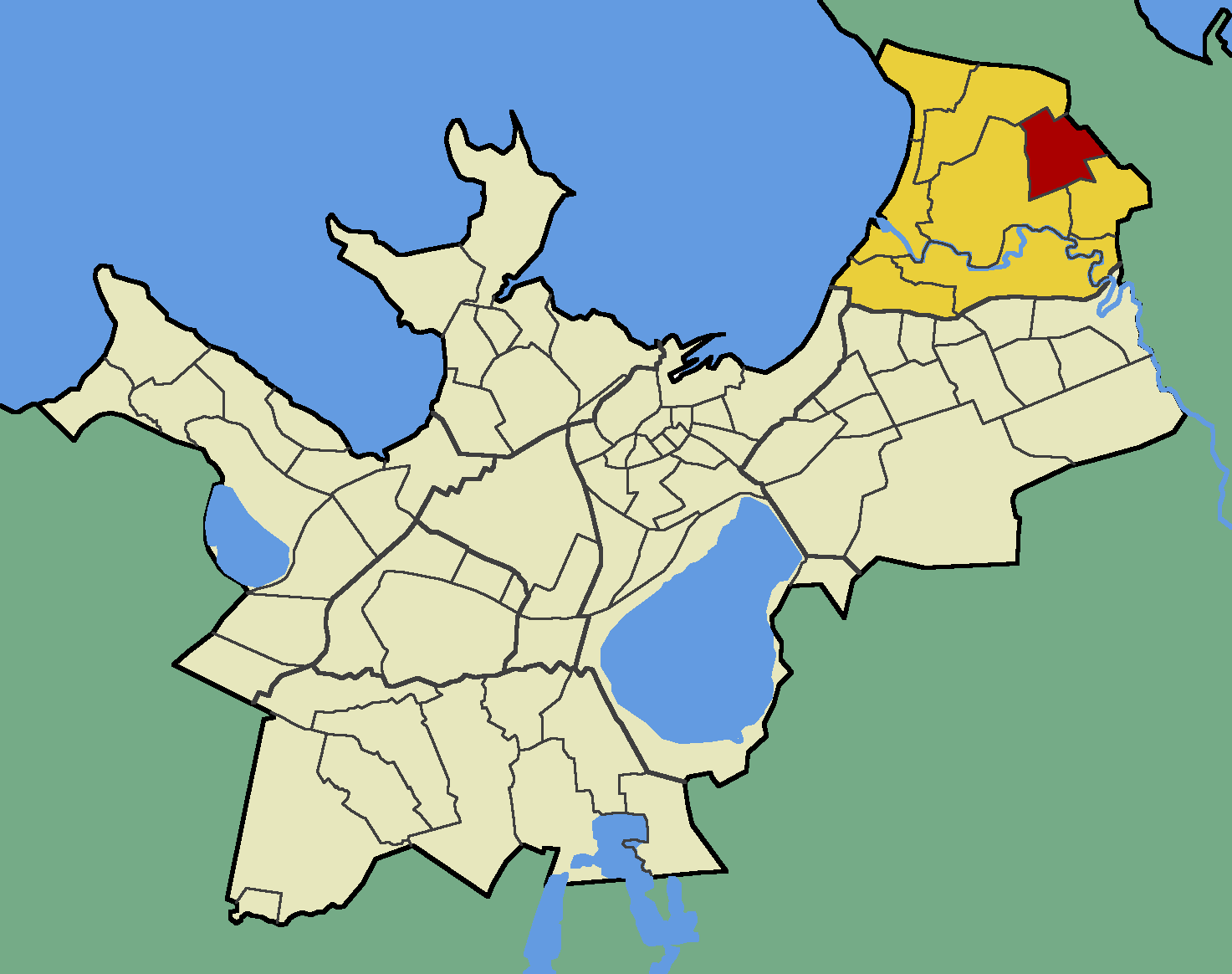
- Lepiku within Pirita District.
- Country: Estonia
- County: Harju County
- City: Tallinn
- District: Pirita

Population (01.01.2014)
  - Total: 1,523

Lepiku (Estonian for "Alder Grove") is a subdistrict (Estonian: asum) in the district of Pirita, Tallinn, the capital of Estonia. It has a population of 1,523 (As of 1 January 2014).

== See also ==
- Pärnamäe Cemetery
- Metsakalmistu
- Tallinn TV Tower
- Kloostrimets
- Tallinn Botanic Garden
