= List of Michelin-starred restaurants in Estonia =

As of the 2026 Michelin Guide, there are 2 restaurants in Estonia with a Michelin-star rating.

The Michelin Guides have been published by the French tire company Michelin since 1900. They were designed as a guide to tell drivers about eateries they recommended to visit and to subtly sponsor their tires, by encouraging drivers to use their cars more and therefore need to replace the tires as they wore out. Over time, the stars that were given out became more valuable. Estonia's guide originally launched in 2022.

Multiple anonymous Michelin inspectors visit the restaurants several times. They rate the restaurants on five criteria: "quality of products", "mastery of flavor and cooking techniques", "the personality of the chef represented in the dining experience", "value for money", and "consistency between inspectors' visits". Inspectors have at least ten years of expertise and create a list of popular restaurants supported by media reports, reviews, and diner popularity. If they reach a consensus, Michelin awards restaurants from one to three stars based on its evaluation methodology: one star means "high-quality cooking, worth a stop", two stars signify "excellent cooking, worth a detour", and three stars denote "exceptional cuisine, worth a special journey". The stars are not permanent and restaurants are constantly re-evaluated. If the criteria are not met, the restaurant will lose its stars.

== Lists ==
Key
1 Michelin star	One Michelin star
2 Michelin stars	Two Michelin stars

Michelin-starred restaurants
Name	Cuisine	Location	2022	2023	2024	2025	2026
180° by Matthias Diether	Contemporary	Tallinn - Kalamaja	1 Michelin star	2 Michelin stars	2 Michelin stars	2 Michelin stars	2 Michelin stars
NOA Chef’s Hall	Contemporary	Tallinn - Merivälja	1 Michelin star	1 Michelin star	1 Michelin star	1 Michelin star	1 Michelin star
Reference							

== See also ==
- Lists of restaurants
- List of Michelin-starred restaurants in Latvia
- List of Michelin-starred restaurants in Lithuania
