= Pirita (subdistrict) =

Subdistrict of Tallinn, Estonia

Coordinates: 59.465914°N 24.832084°E

- Subdistrict of Tallinn
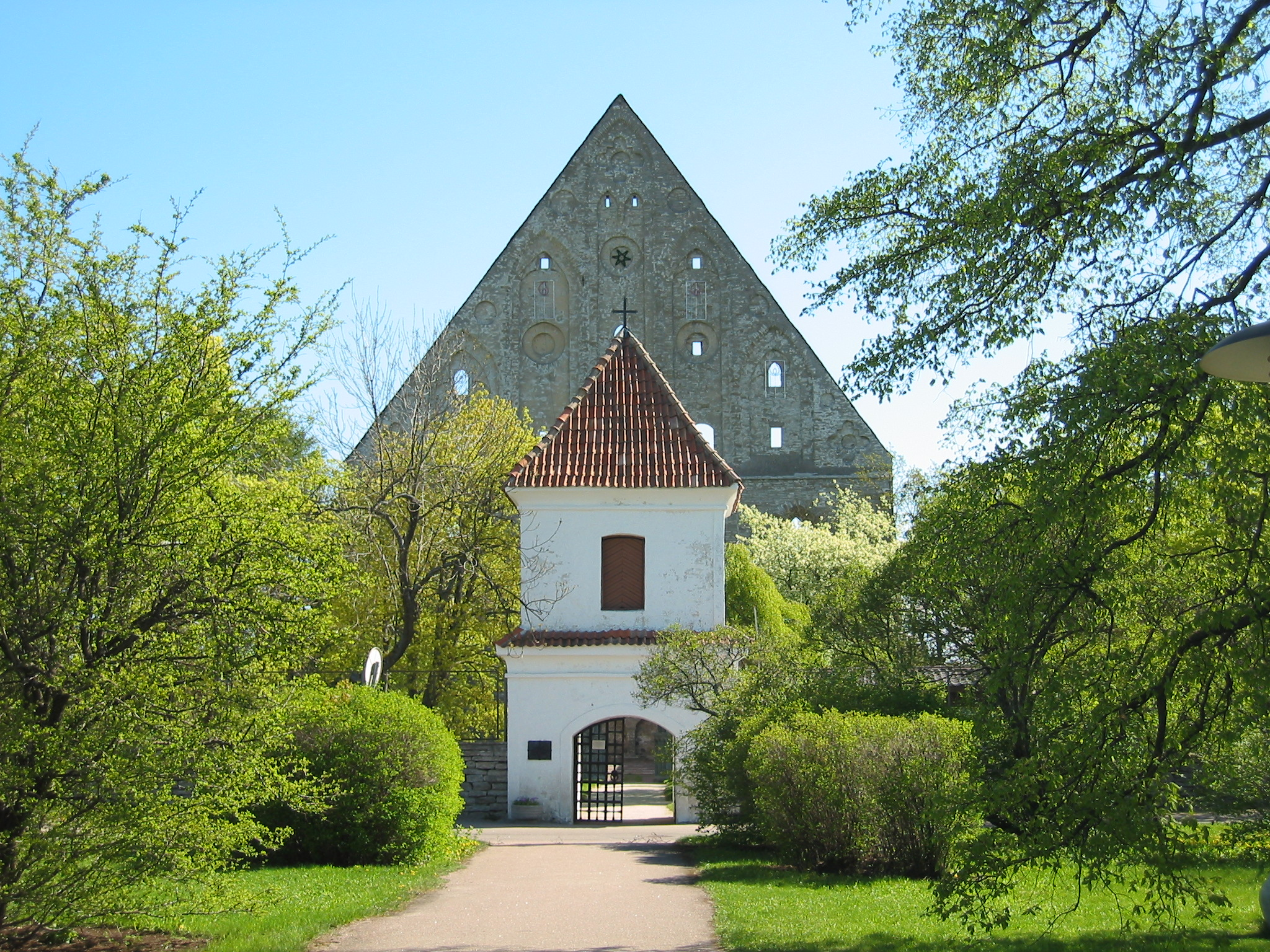
- Ruins of the St. Brigitta's Convent

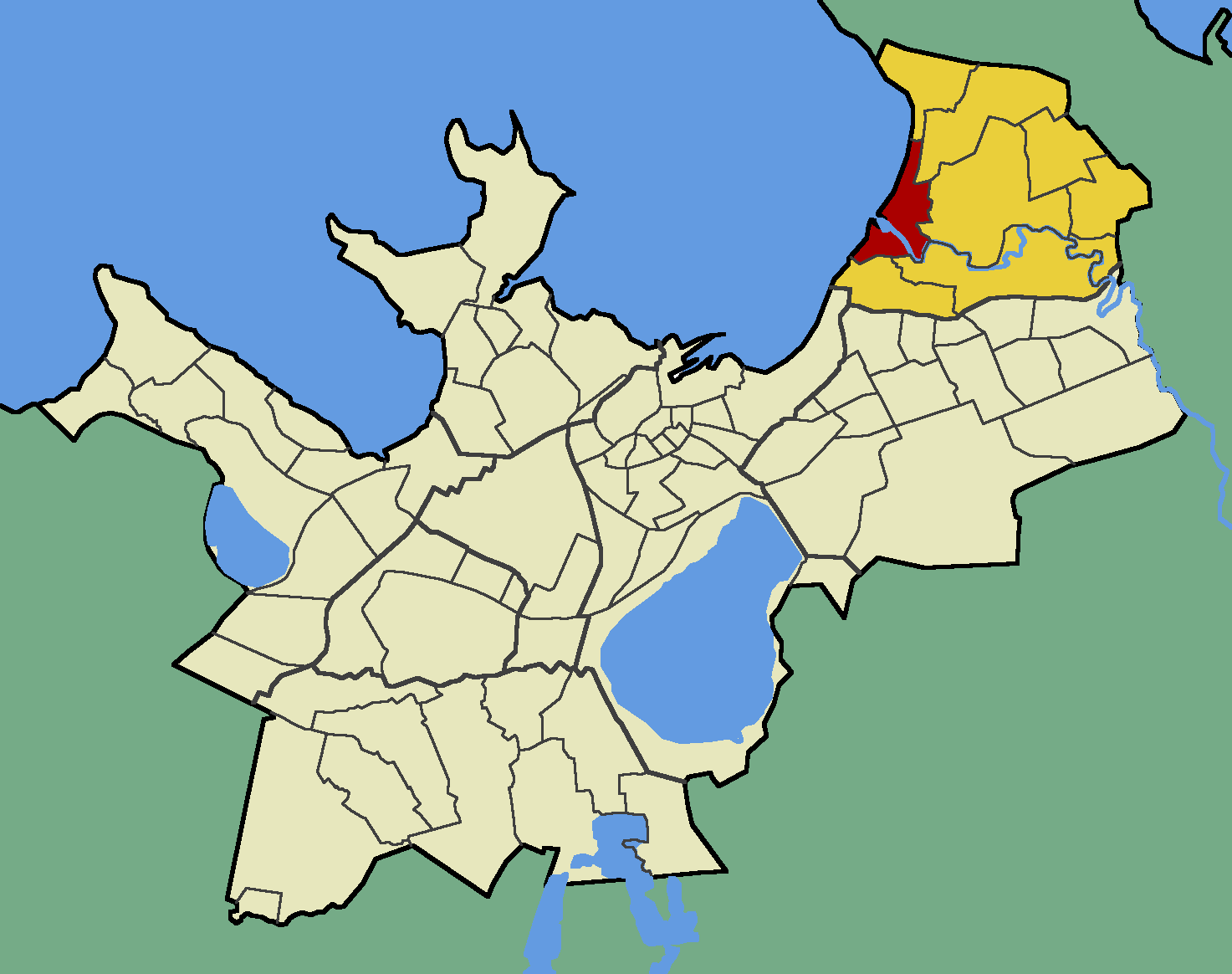
- Pirita subdistrict within Pirita District.
- Country: Estonia
- County: Harju County
- City: Tallinn
- District: Pirita

Population (01.01.2014)
  - Total: 960

Pirita is a subdistrict (Estonian: asum) in the district of Pirita, Tallinn, the capital of Estonia. It is located around the estuary of the Pirita River to the Tallinn Bay. The subdistrict has a population of 960 (As of 1 January 2014). Pirita was selected as the venue of the sailing events for the 1980 summer Olympics. During the preparations for the Olympics, sports buildings were built in Tallinn including the Pirita Yachting Centre and the Hotel Olümpia.

Pirita District Administration

District Elder Tõnis Liinat

== Gallery ==
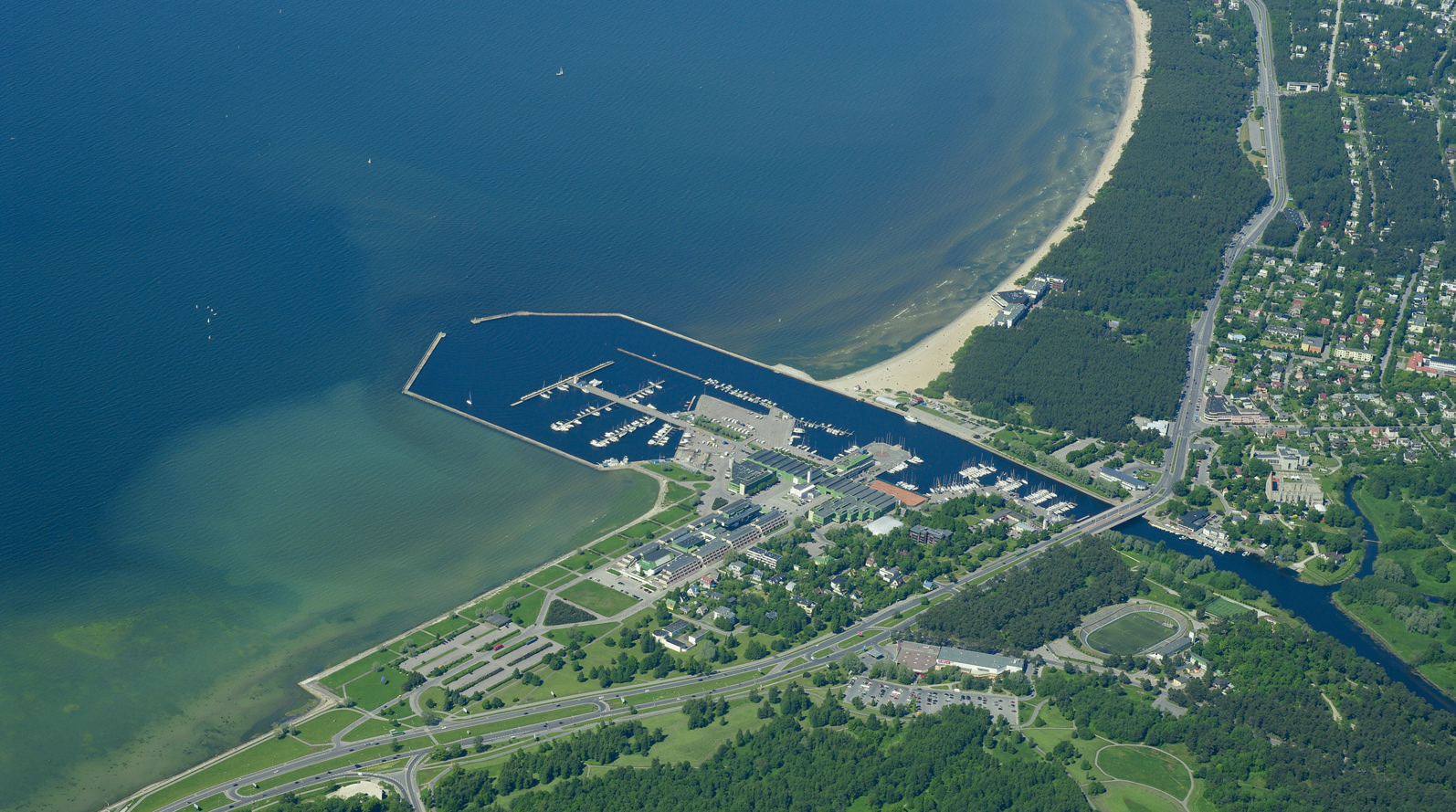
Aerial view of Pirita subdistrict.

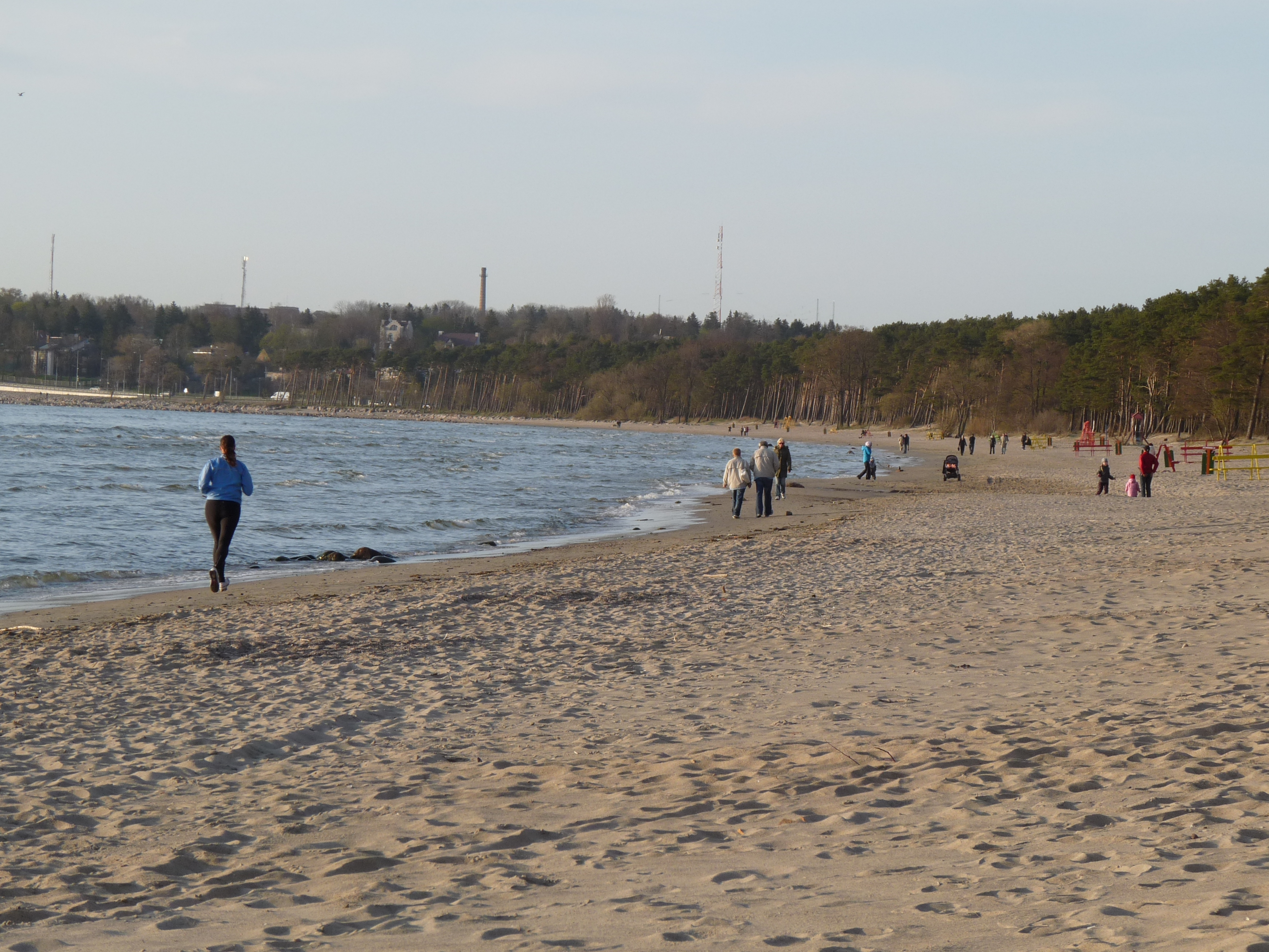
Pirita Beach

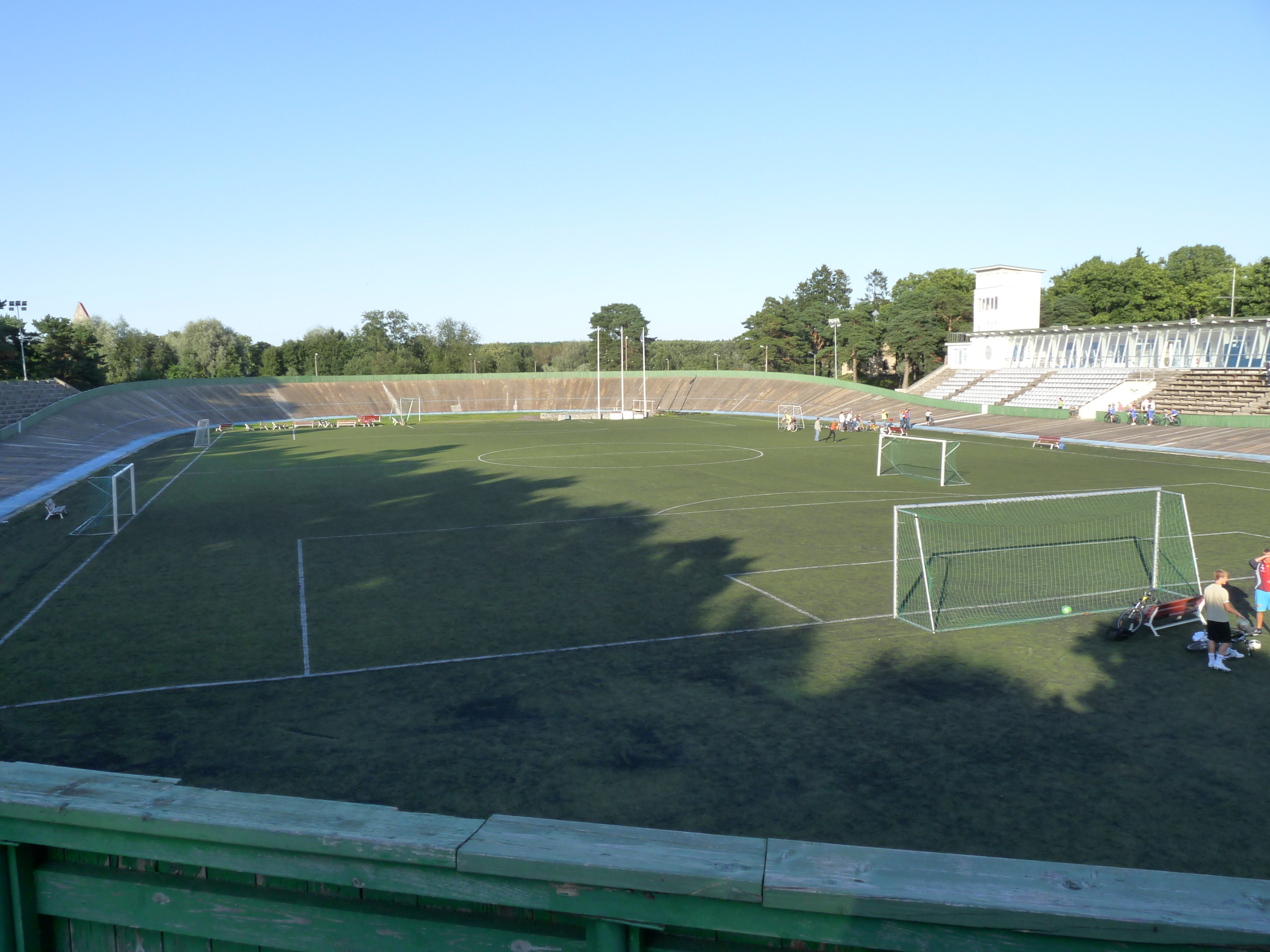
Pirita Velodrome

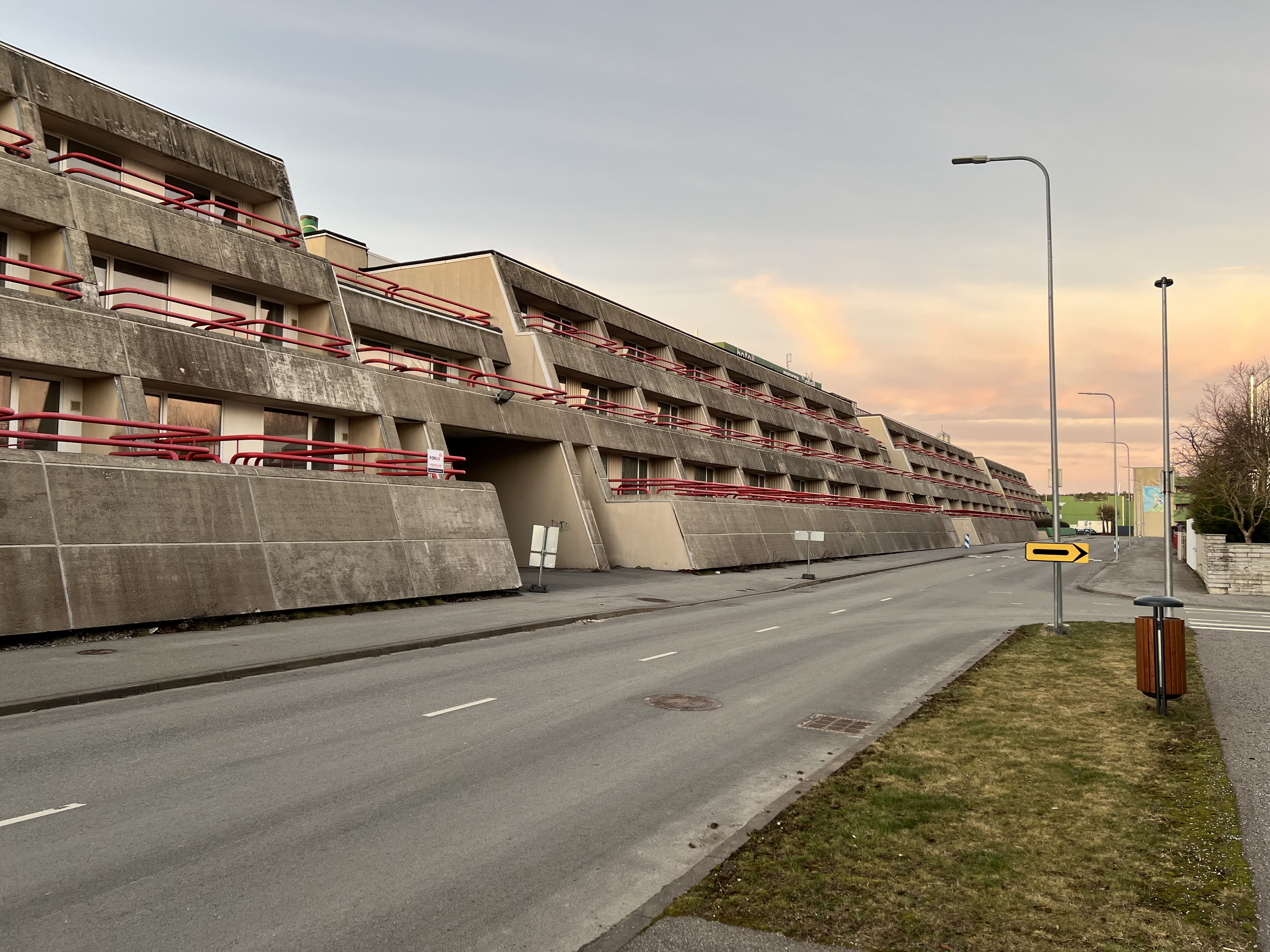
A hotel building on Regati boulevard, an example of brutalist architecture

== See also ==
- Kloostrimets
- Pirita Beach
- Pirita Convent
- Pirita-Kose-Kloostrimetsa Circuit
- Pirita River
- Pirita Velodrome
- Pirita Yachting Centre
