= List of Michelin-starred restaurants in Lithuania =

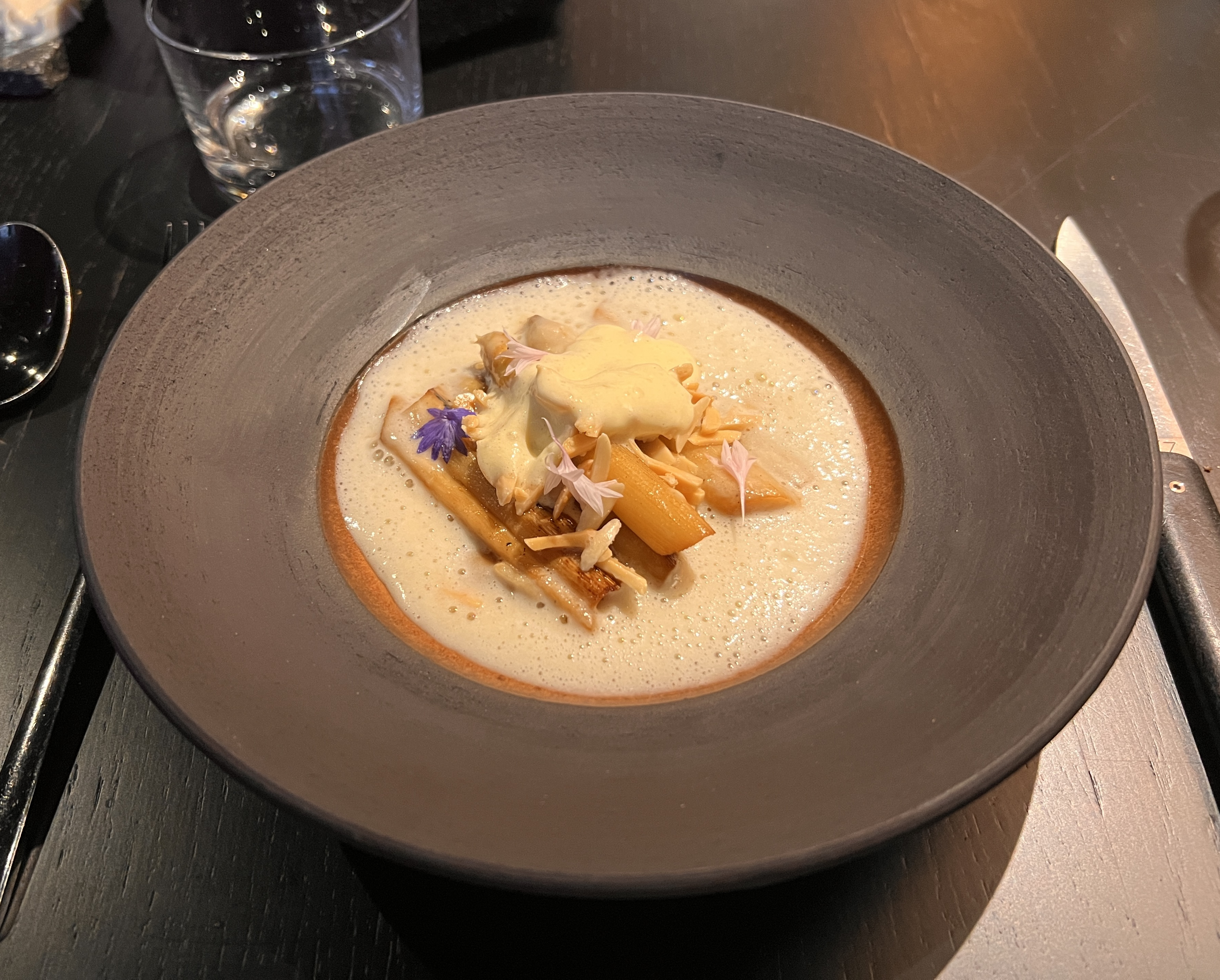
An asparagus-based dish in the restaurant Džiaugsmas in July 2025.

As of the 2026 Michelin Guide, there are 5 restaurants in Lithuania with a Michelin-star rating.

The Michelin Guides have been published by the French tire company Michelin since 1900. They were designed as a guide to tell drivers about eateries they recommended to visit and to subtly sponsor their tires, by encouraging drivers to use their cars more and therefore need to replace the tires as they wore out. Over time, the stars that were given out became more valuable. Lithuania's guide was funded in partnership with Lithuania Travel and reviewing restaurants across the country.

Multiple anonymous Michelin inspectors visit the restaurants several times. They rate the restaurants on five criteria: "quality of products", "mastery of flavor and cooking techniques", "the personality of the chef represented in the dining experience", "value for money", and "consistency between inspectors' visits". Inspectors have at least ten years of expertise and create a list of popular restaurants supported by media reports, reviews, and diner popularity. If they reach a consensus, Michelin awards restaurants from one to three stars based on its evaluation methodology: one star means "high-quality cooking, worth a stop", two stars signify "excellent cooking, worth a detour", and three stars denote "exceptional cuisine, worth a special journey". The stars are not permanent and restaurants are constantly re-evaluated. If the criteria are not met, the restaurant will lose its stars.

== List ==
Key
1 Michelin star	One Michelin star
—	The restaurant did not receive a star that year
Closed	The restaurant is no longer open

Michelin-starred restaurants
Name	Cuisine	Location	2024	2025	2026
Deep Roots	Modern	Vilnius – Old Town	—	—	1 Michelin star
Demo	Innovative	Vilnius – Naujamiestis	1 Michelin star	1 Michelin star	1 Michelin star
Džiaugsmas	Modern	Vilnius – Old Town	1 Michelin star	1 Michelin star	1 Michelin star
Nineteen18	Modern	Vilnius – Old Town	1 Michelin star	1 Michelin star	1 Michelin star
Pas mus	Modern	Vilnius – Old Town	1 Michelin star	1 Michelin star	Closed
Red Brick	Modern	Utena County – Radiškis	—	—	1 Michelin star
Reference					

== See also ==
- Lists of restaurants
- List of Michelin-starred restaurants in Estonia
- List of Michelin-starred restaurants in Latvia
- List of Michelin-starred restaurants in Poland
