= Laiaküla, Tallinn =

Subdistrict of Tallinn, Estonia

Coordinates: 59.470885°N 24.9015°E

Laiaküla
- Subdistrict of Tallinn
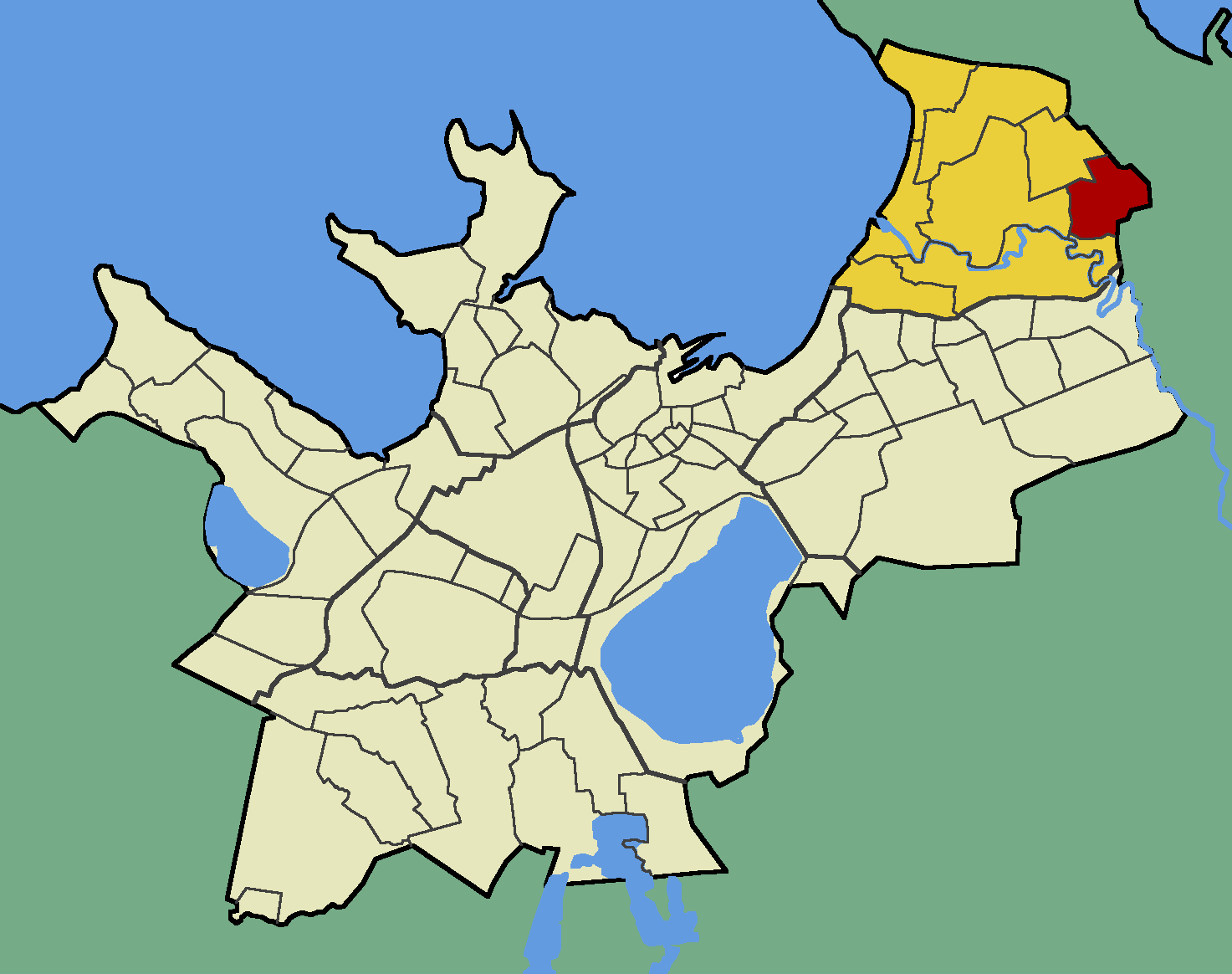
- Laiaküla within Pirita District.
- Country: Estonia
- County: Harju County
- City: Tallinn
- District: Pirita

Population (01.01.2014)
  - Total: 178

Laiaküla (Estonian for "Wide Village") is a subdistrict (Estonian: asum) in the district of Pirita, Tallinn, the capital of Estonia. It has a population of 178 (As of 1 January 2014).

== See also ==
- Pärnamäe Cemetery
- Laiaküla (Viimsi Parish)
