= List of Michelin-starred restaurants in Latvia =

As of the 2027 guide, there are 2 restaurants in Latvia with a Michelin-star rating, a rating system used by the Michelin Guide to grade restaurants based on their quality.

The Michelin Guide originally launched in Latvia in 2024, reviewing restaurants across the country.

Launched in 1900, the Michelin Guides were designed by the tire-maker Michelin. It recommended eateries the drivers should visit, subtly sponsoring their tires, by encouraging drivers to use their cars more and therefore need to replace the tires as they wore out. Over time, the stars that were given out started to become more valuable.

== Lists ==
Key
| 1 Michelin star | One Michelin star |
| — | The restaurant did not receive a star that year |

Michelin-starred restaurants
| Name | Cuisine | Location | 2024 | 2025 | 2026 | 2027 |
|---|---|---|---|---|---|---|
| JOHN Chef's Hall | Modern | Riga – Centrs | — | 1 Michelin star | 1 Michelin star | 1 Michelin star |
| Max Cekot Kitchen | Creative | Riga – Torņakalns | 1 Michelin star | 1 Michelin star | 1 Michelin star | 1 Michelin star |
| Reference | | | | | | |

== See also ==
- Lists of restaurants
- List of Michelin-starred restaurants in Estonia
- List of Michelin-starred restaurants in Lithuania
