= Tallinn Botanic Garden =

Botanic garden in Tallinn, Estonia

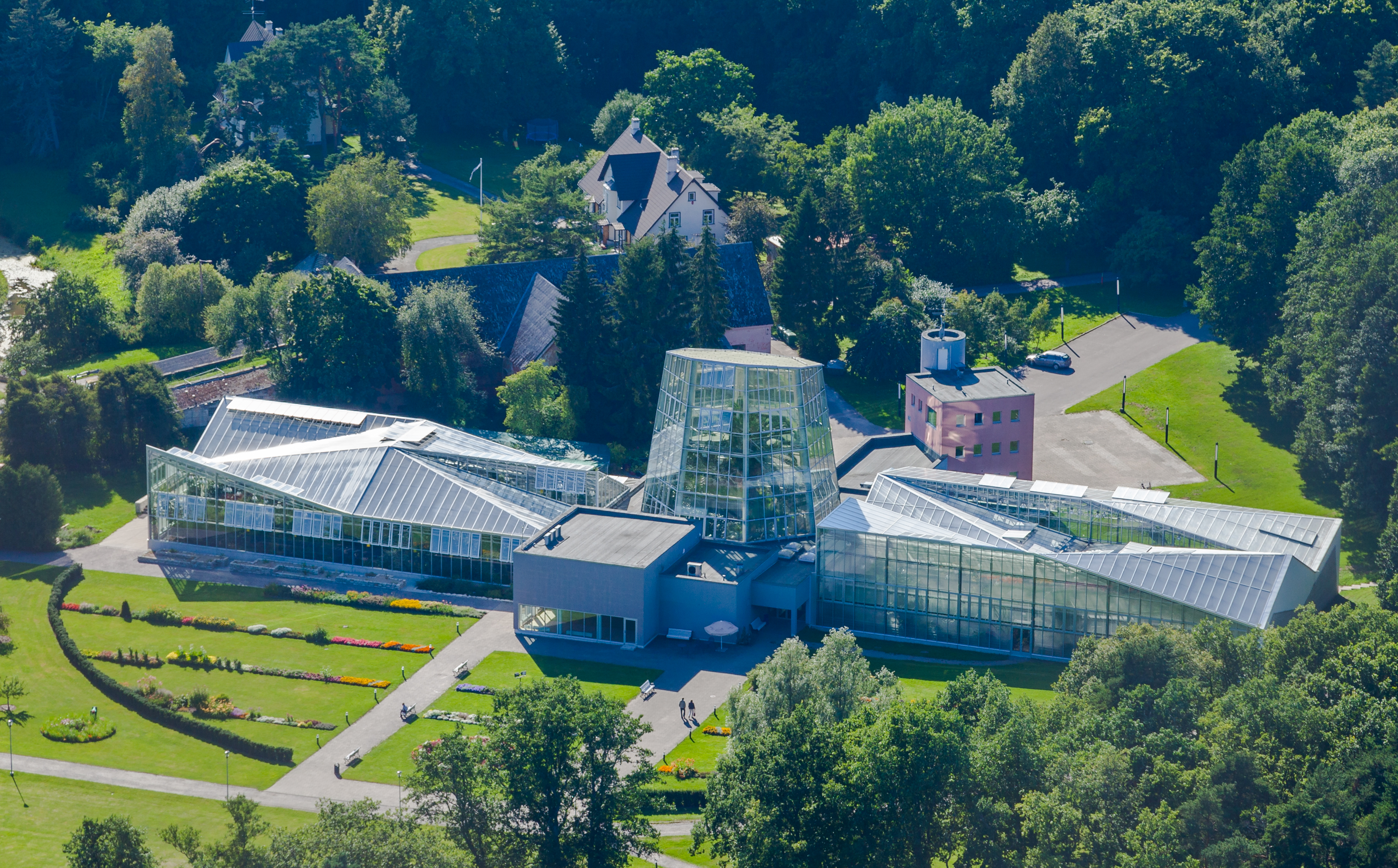
- Interactive map of Tallinn Botanic Garden
- Type: Botanical
- Location: Tallinn, Estonia
- Coordinates: 59°28′11″N 24°52′41″E
- Area: 123 ha (300 acres)
- Opened: 1 December 1961
- Owner: Tallinn City Council
- Status: Open
- Website: http://www.botaanikaaed.ee; http://tallinnbotanicgarden.org/

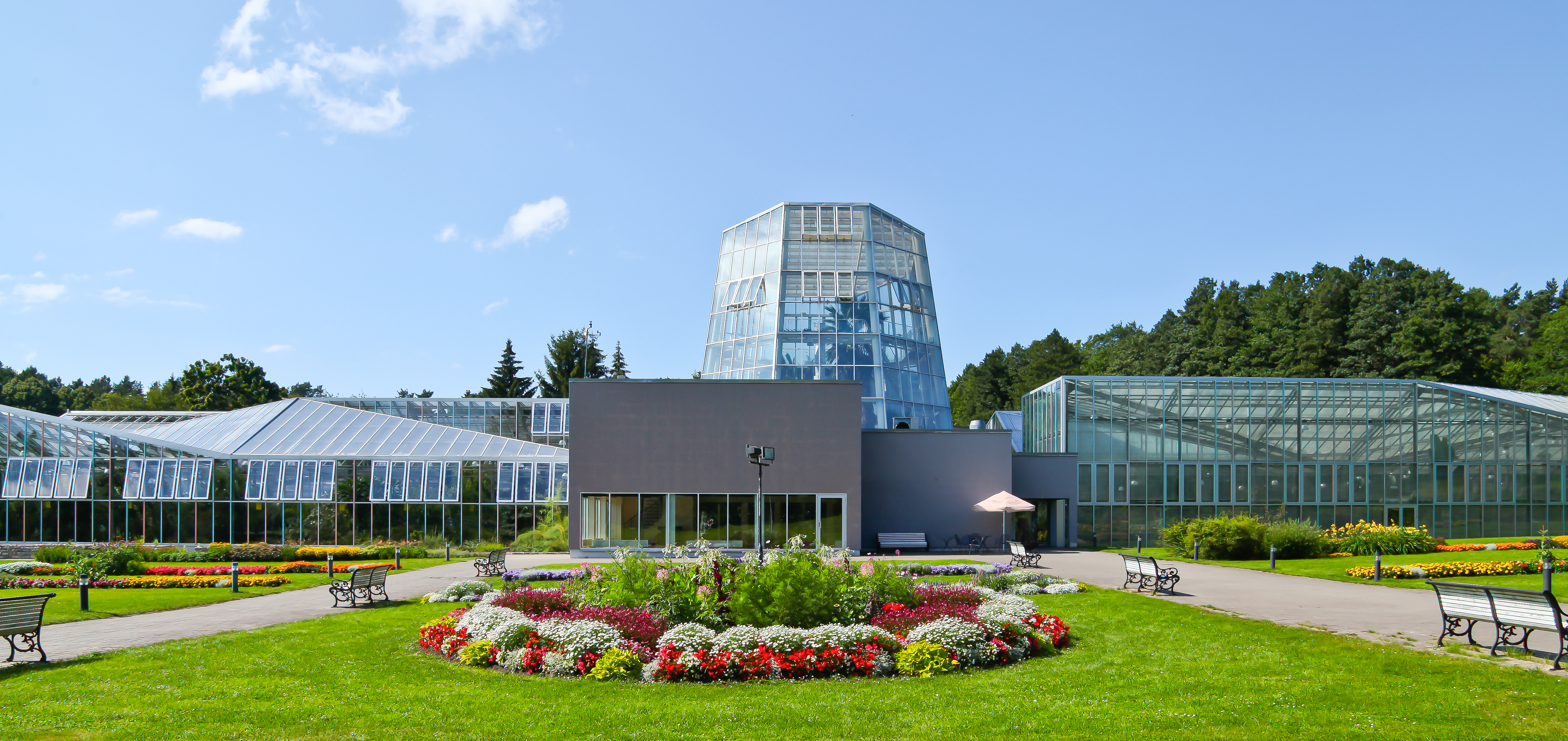
Main building

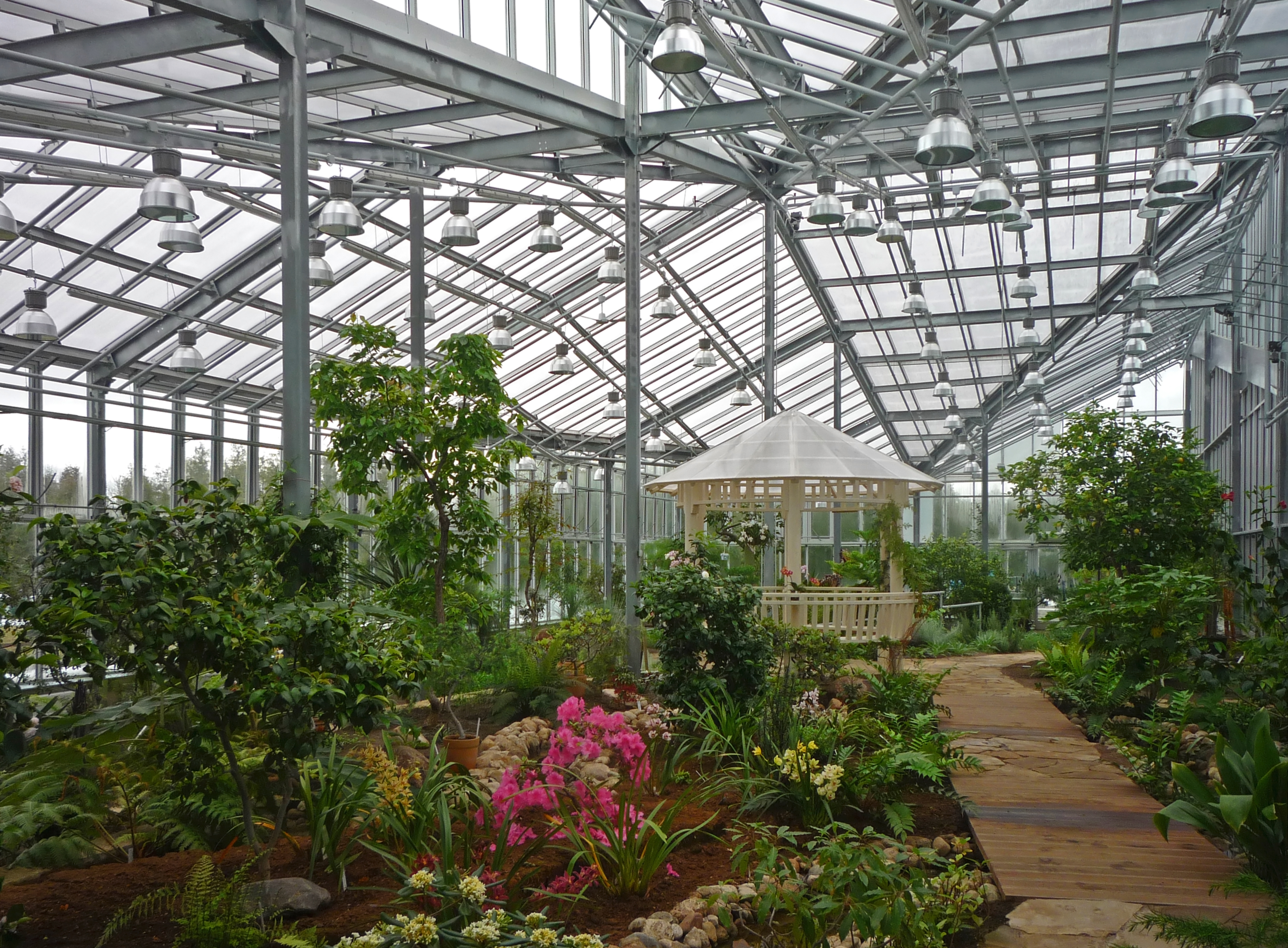
New gallery

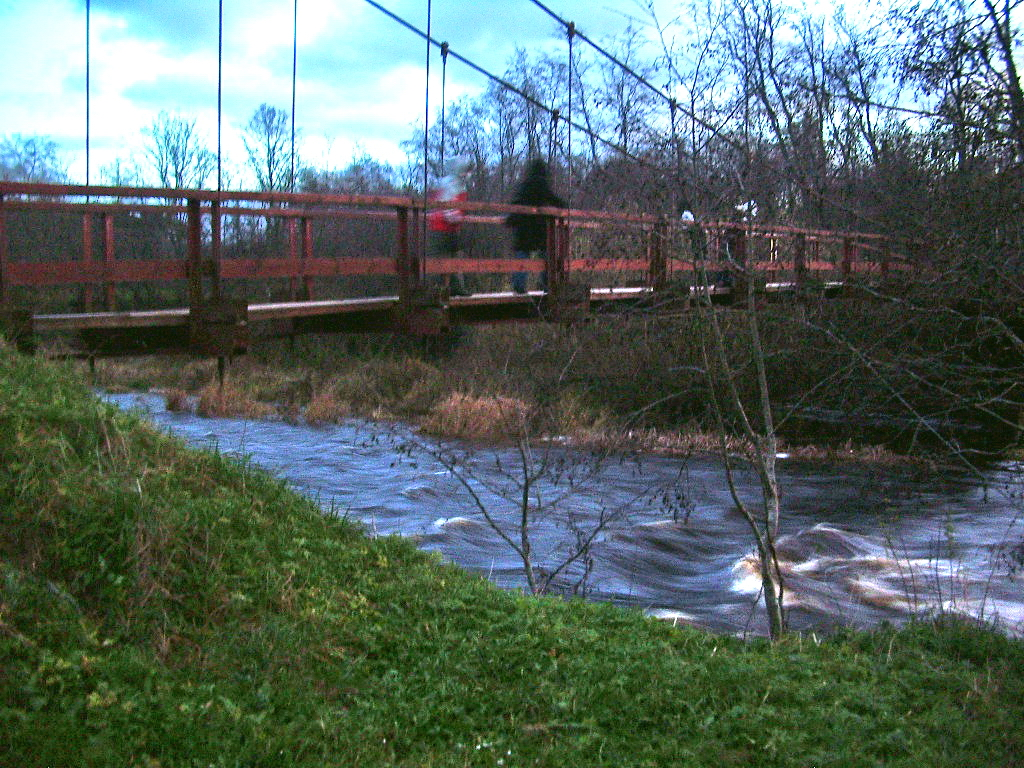
A suspension bridge over the Pirita River.

Tallinn Botanic Garden (Estonian: Tallinna Botaanikaaed), is a botanical garden in Tallinn, Estonia. It is located on the right bank of the Pirita River, in the Kloostrimetsa forest in Pirita district. With an area of 40 hectares, it is the largest in Estonia.

== History ==
The idea of founding a botanical garden in Tallinn first arose in the 1860s. It took almost 100 years for the idea to be realized. The garden was established on 1 December 1961 as a subordinate institution of the Academy of Sciences of the Estonian SSR and was developed over the following years. Major plant collections were planted during the first 20 years. The systematic open-air collections were opened for visitors in 1970 and the greenhouse collections in 1971.

Originally, the main focus of research was the foreign species in Estonian context e.g. plant growth requirements and acclimatisation. From the 1970s research moved to the use of indigenous plant species in landscaping and horticulture (Ülle Kukk, Vaike Paju, Marianna Saar etc.)

The Botanic Garden has added a number of sections, such as the Audaku experimental station in Viidumäe Nature Reserve on Saaremaa (since 1963) and an arboretum in Iru (1973–1994).

Since 1992 Tallinn Botanic Garden is a member of the Association of Baltic Botanic Gardens (ABBG), and since 1994 the Botanic Garden Conservation International (BGCI) and the Network of Botanic Gardens in the Baltic Sea region.

In 1995, the responsibility for the Botanic Garden was transferred to the Tallinn city council.

The territory of Tallinn Botanic garden occupy the land of the former farm of Konstantin Päts, the first President of Estonia.

=== Directors ===
Directors of the Botanic Garden have been:

- Arnold Pukk (1961–1978)
- Jüri Martin (1978–1988)
- Andres Tarand (1989–1990)
- Heiki Tamm (1991–1997)
- Jüri Ott (1997–2001)
- Veiko Lõhmus (2001–2005)
- Margus Kingisepp (2005–2009)
- Karmen Kähr (2009–2017)
- Urve Sinijärv (2018–present)

== Collections ==
The Botanic Garden opened the doors to visitors to the systematically arranged outdoor collections in 1970, and the greenhouse collections a year later. The garden includes an arboretum, rosary (rose garden) and rock garden.

== See also ==
- University of Tartu Botanical Gardens
