= Pirita =

District of Tallinn, Estonia

- District of Tallinn
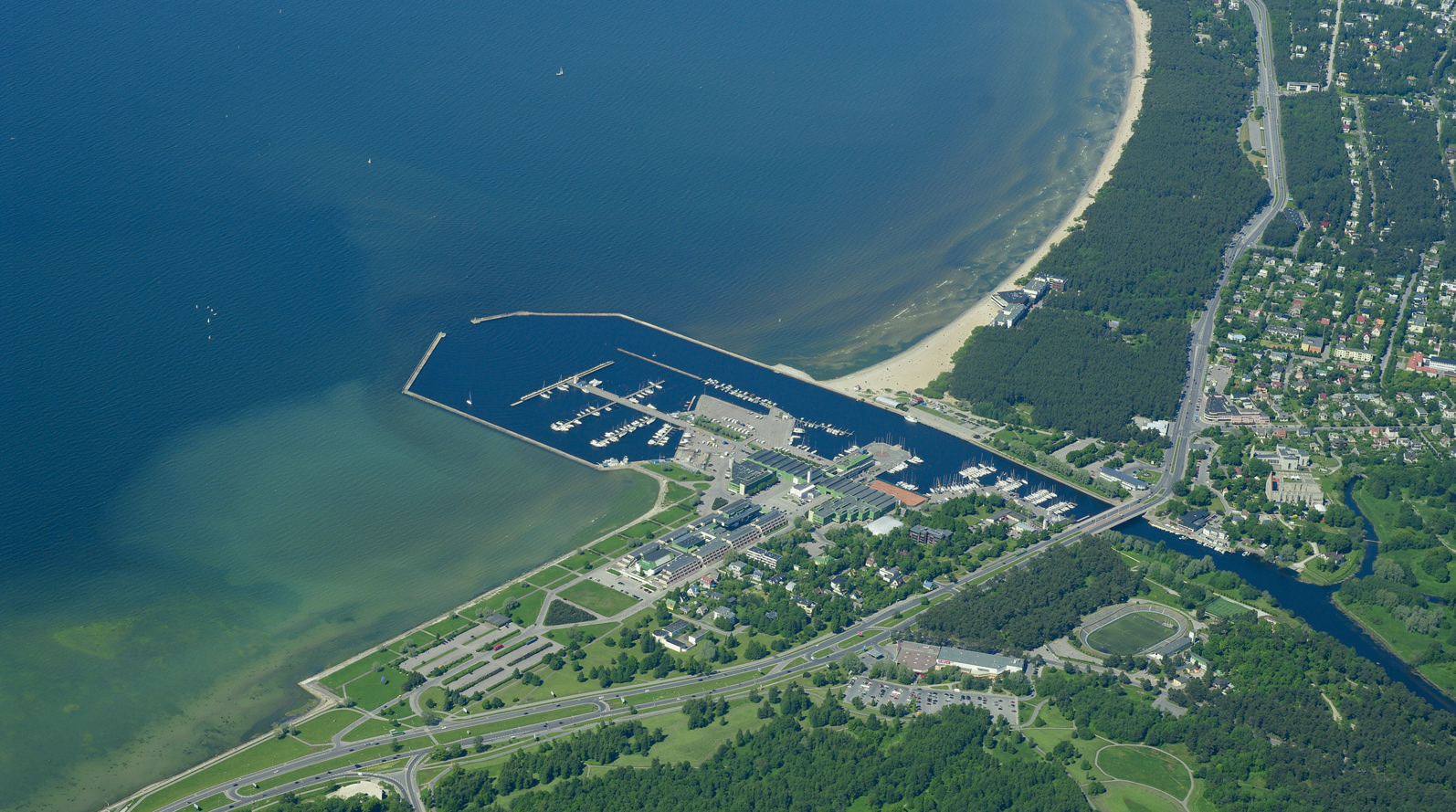
- Pirita from above

- Flag Coat of arms

- Location of Pirita in Tallinn.
- Coordinates: 59°28′01″N 24°49′58″E
- Country: Estonia
- County: Harju County
- City: Tallinn

Government
  - District Elder: Doris Raudsepp (Reform Party)

Area
  - Total: 18.7 km^{2} (7.2 sq mi)

Population (1 August 2025)
  - Total: 19,746
  - Density: 1,060/km^{2} (2,730/sq mi)
- Website: tallinn.ee

Pirita is one of the eight administrative districts (Estonian: linnaosa) of Tallinn, the capital of Estonia.

Pirita occupies a relatively large area, but compared to other districts of Tallinn its population of 19,746 (as of 1 August 2025) is relatively small. It mostly consists of private houses. Large parts of the district consist of newly built modern buildings and houses. Pirita Beach is located in Pirita.

Pirita is one of the most prestigious and wealthiest districts of Tallinn, partly thanks to natural features such as its beach and yachting harbour. Pirita Beach is the largest in Tallinn, and in the summer it can attract up to 30,000 visitors a day.

== Population ==
Pirita has a population of 19,746 (As of 1 August 2025).

Ethnic composition 1989-2021
Ethnicity	1989		2000		2011		2021	
Ethnicity	amount	%	amount	%	amount	%	amount	%
Estonians	7210	86.3	8856	88.9	12667	78.4	12402	71.5
Russians	810	9.70	746	7.49	2732	16.9	3531	20.3
Ukrainians	-	-	-	-	203	1.26	369	2.13
Belarusians	-	-	-	-	79	0.49	128	0.74
Finns	-	-	-	-	103	0.64	122	0.70
Jews	-	-	-	-	77	0.48	68	0.39
Latvians	-	-	-	-	22	0.14	49	0.28
Germans	-	-	-	-	22	0.14	35	0.20
Tatars	-	-	-	-	17	0.11	23	0.13
Poles	-	-	-	-	11	0.07	27	0.16
Lithuanians	-	-	-	-	23	0.14	44	0.25
unknown	0	0.00	44	0.44	34	0.21	98	0.56
other	330	3.95	316	3.17	175	1.08	458	2.64
Total	8350	100	9962	100	16165	100	17354	100

Population development
Year	2004	2005	2006	2007	2008	2009	2010	2011	2012	2013	2014
Population	10,388	11,299	12,277	13,235	14,039	14,595	15,135	15,567	16,636	17,019	17,373

== Subdistricts ==
Pirita is divided into 9 subdistricts (Estonian: asum): Iru, Kloostrimetsa, Kose, Laiaküla, Lepiku, Maarjamäe, Merivälja, Mähe, and Pirita.

== Landmarks ==
- Pirita monastery
- Tallinn TV Tower
- Tallinn Botanic Garden
- Pirita Yachting Centre
- Pirita Beach
- Metsakalmistu cemetery
- Pärnamäe cemetery
- Pirita Velodrome

== Gallery ==
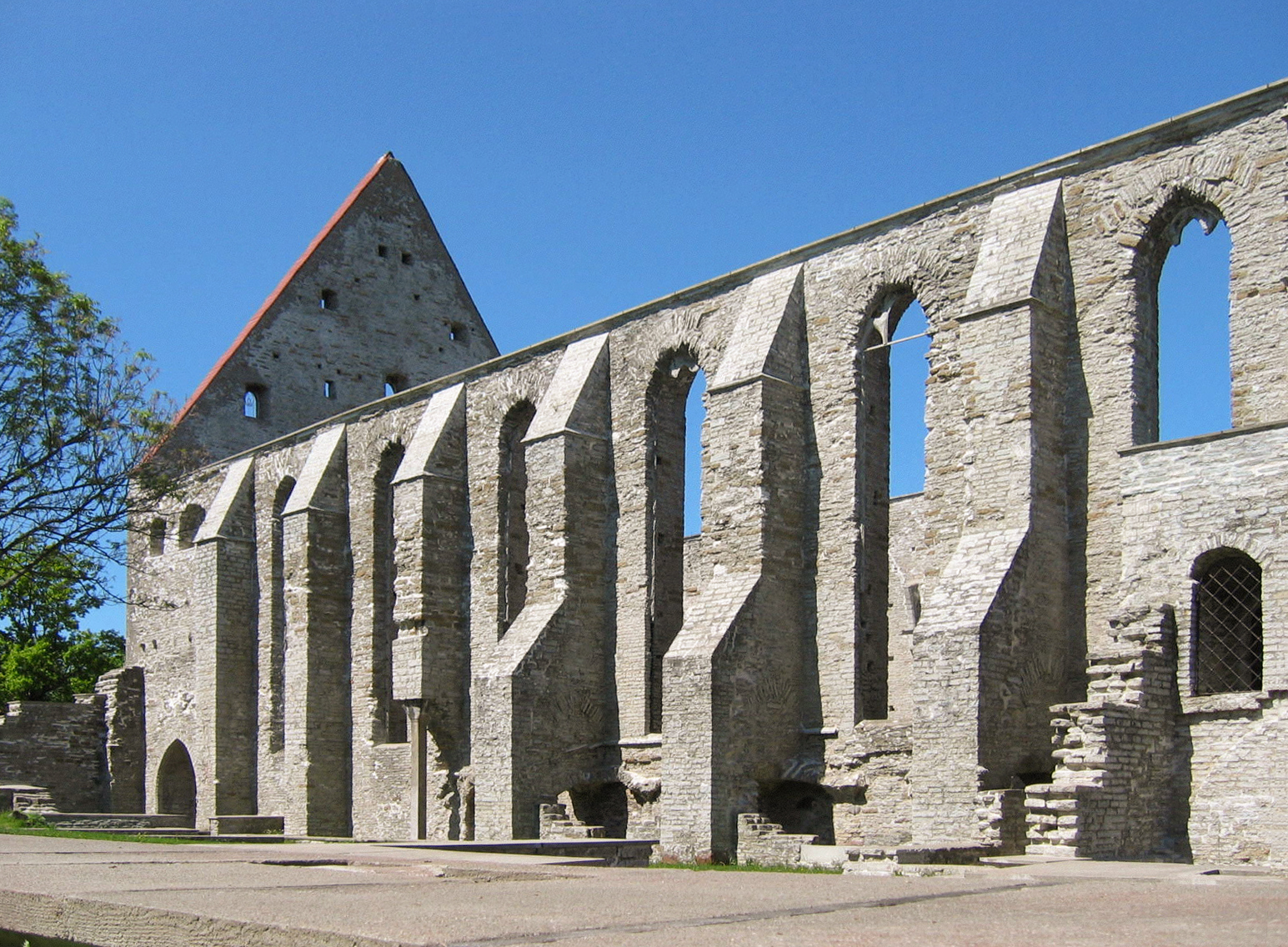
Pirita monastery

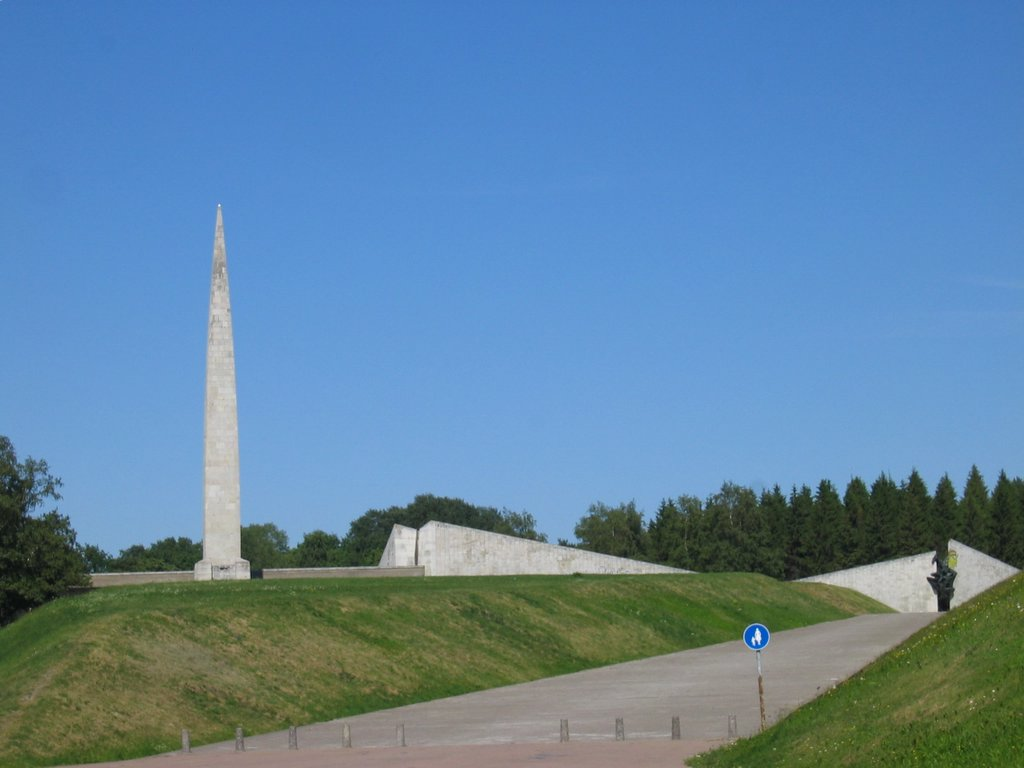
Maarjamäe War Memorial

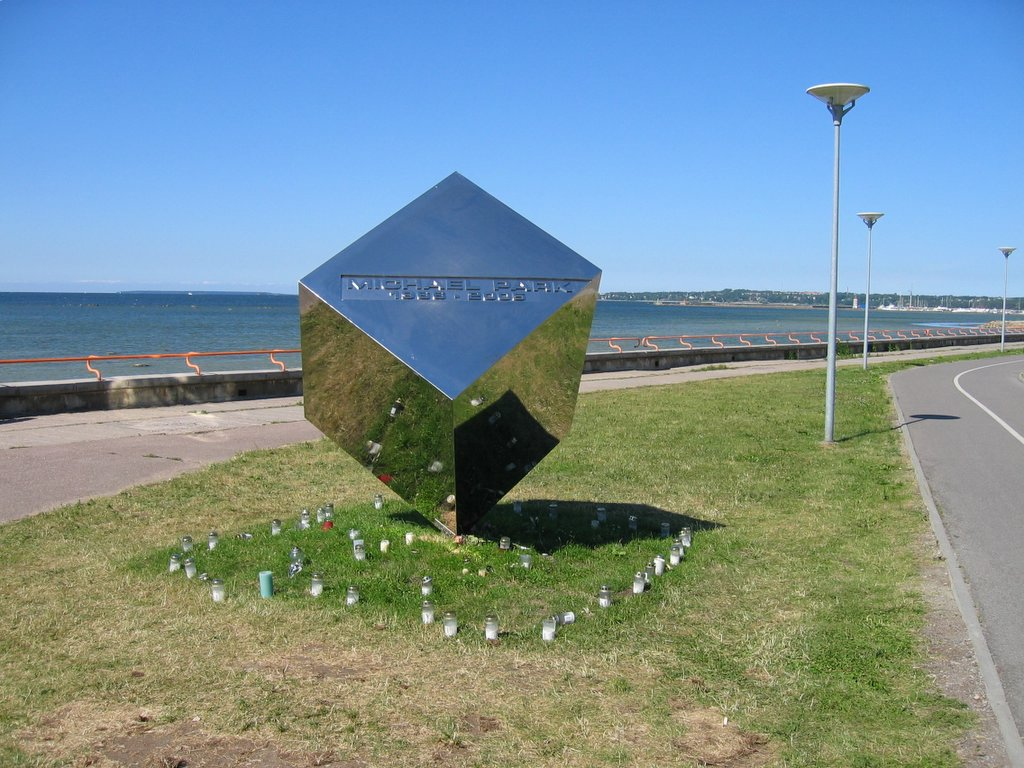
Monument to Michael Park

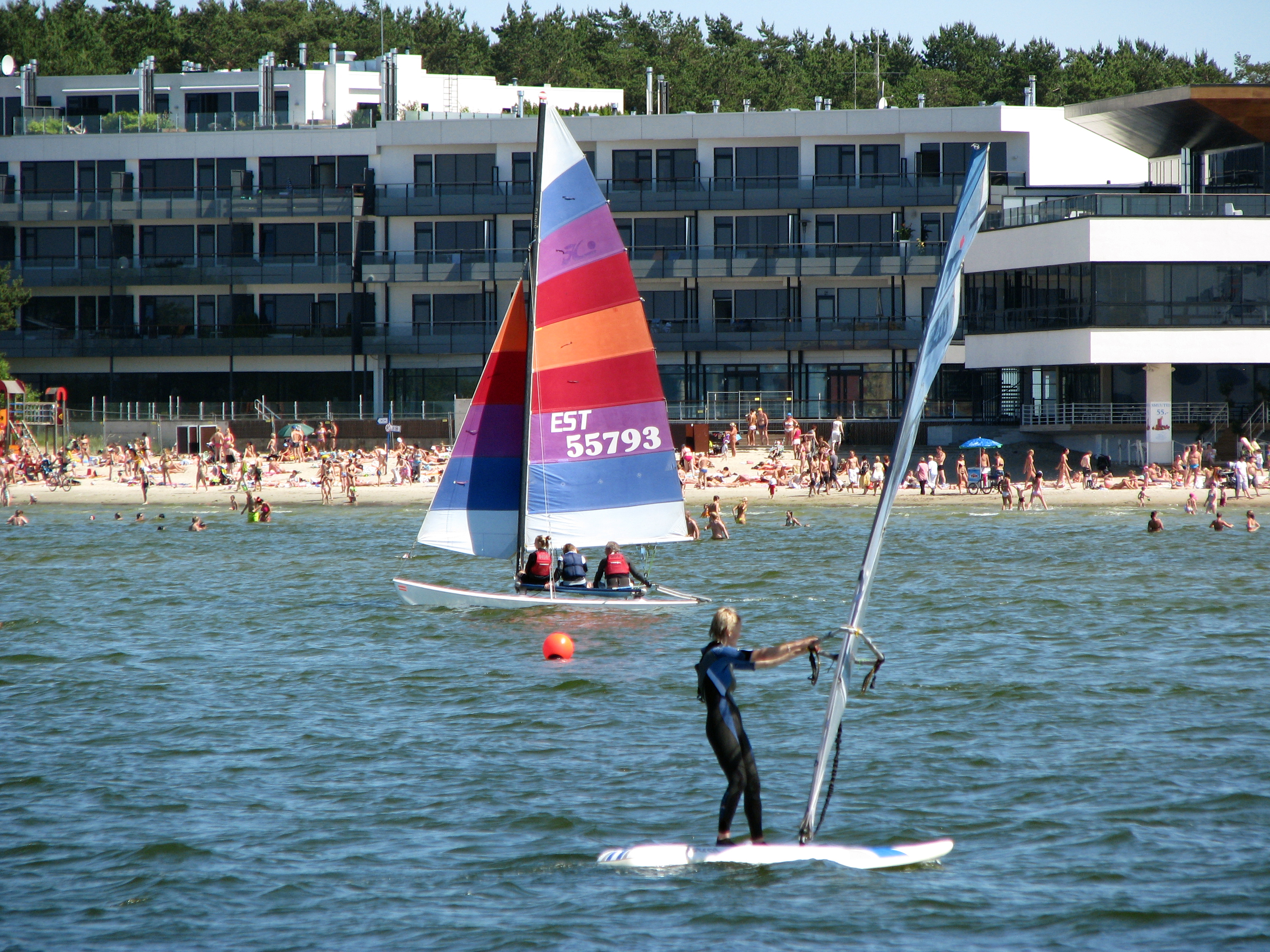
Pirita Beach

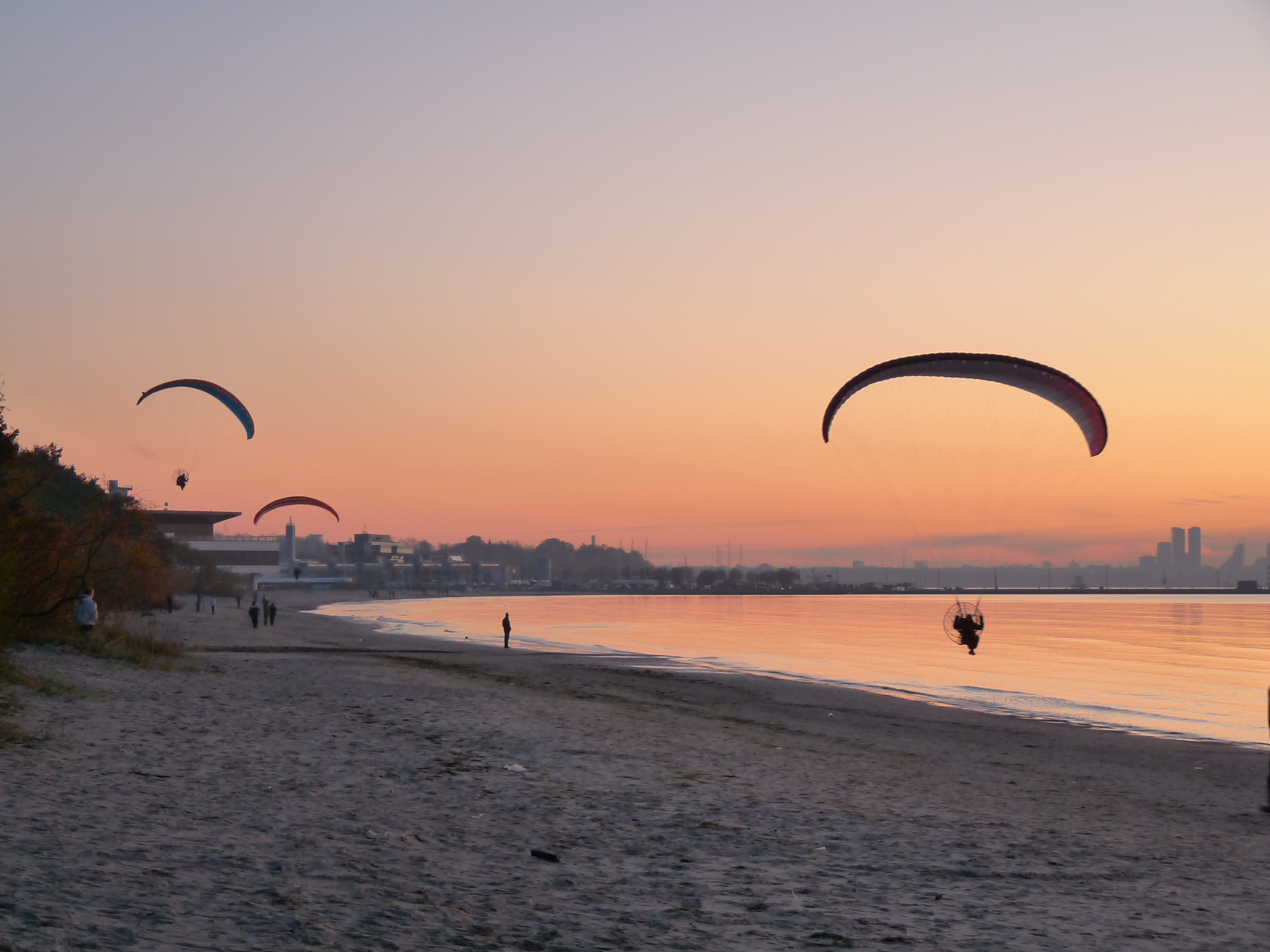
Pirita Beach

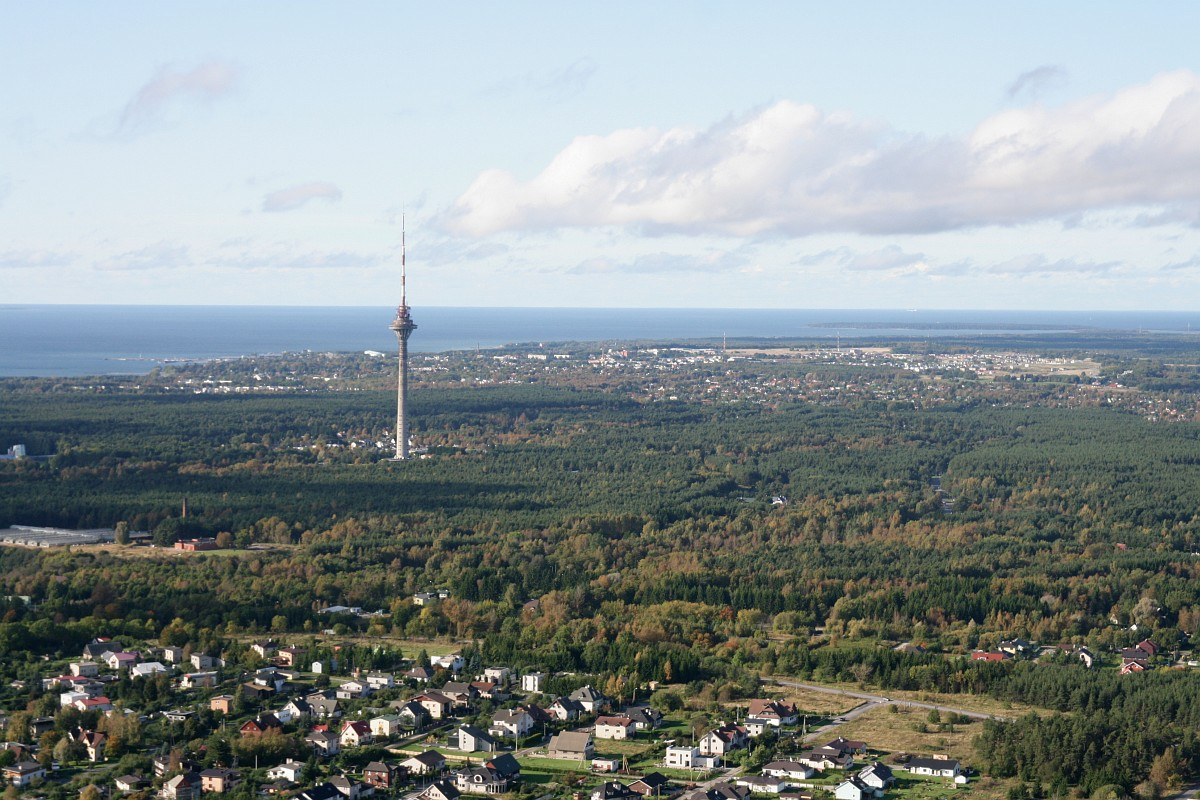
Tallinn TV Tower

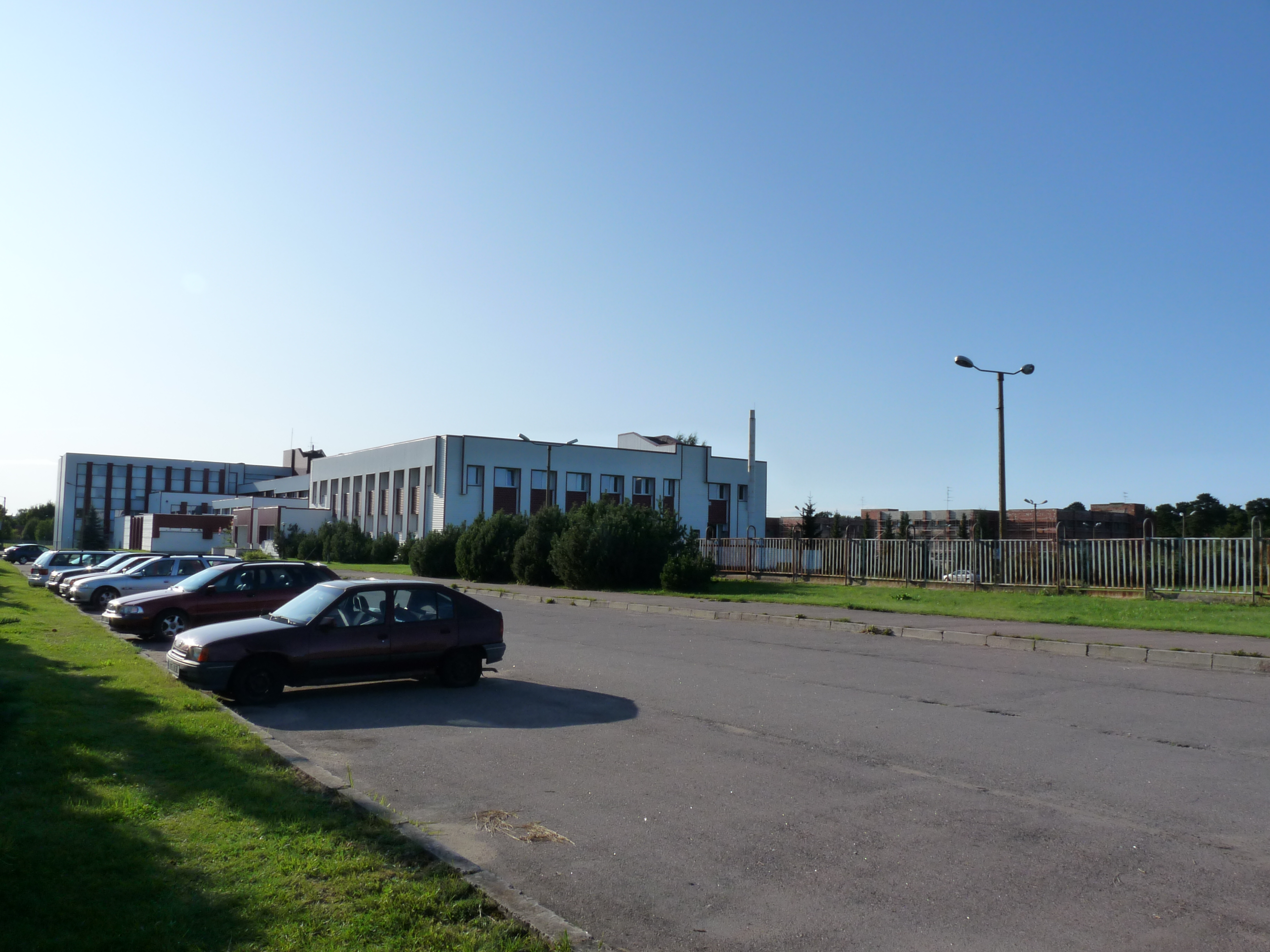
Academy of Internal Defence

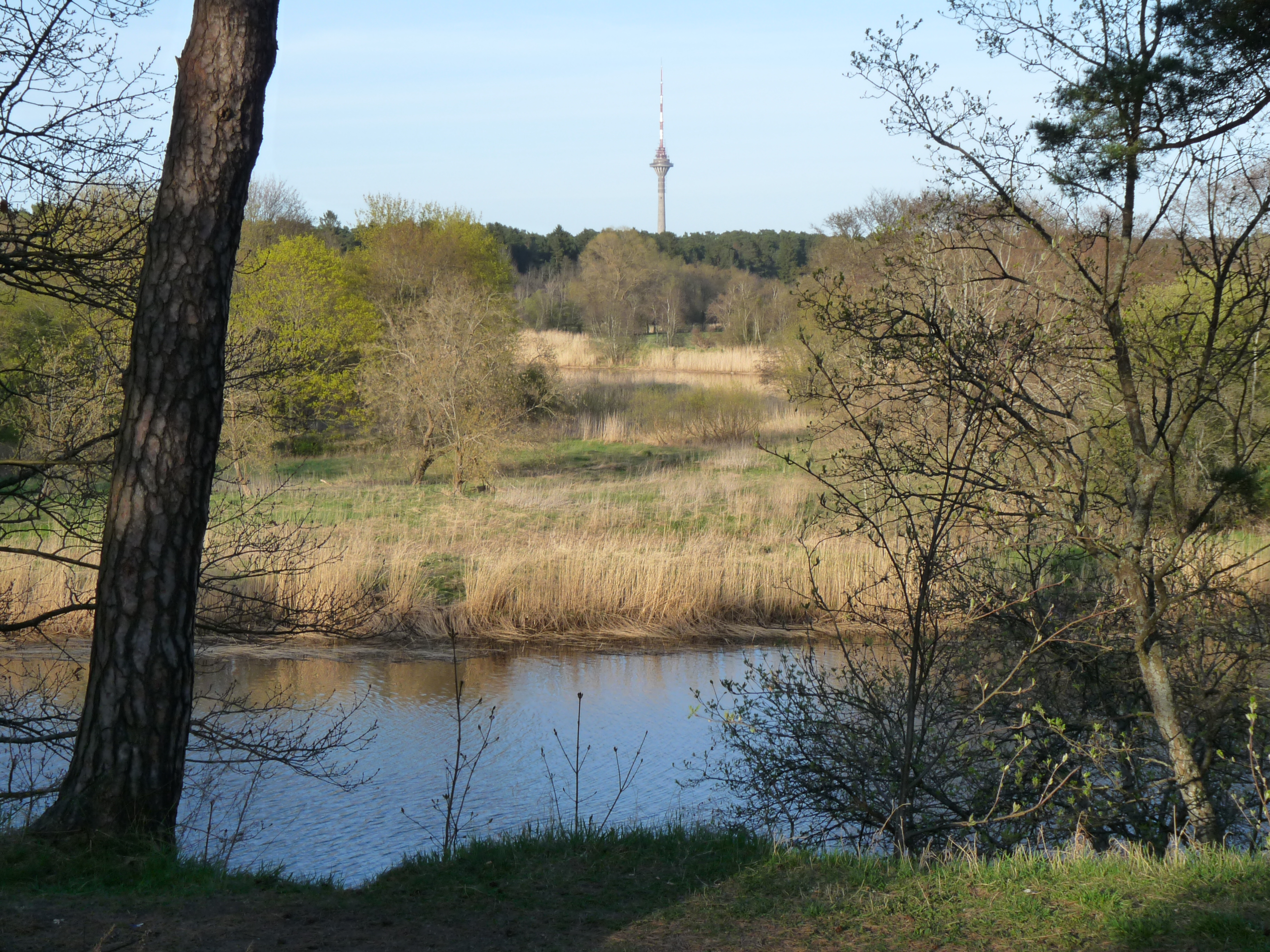
Pirita Forest

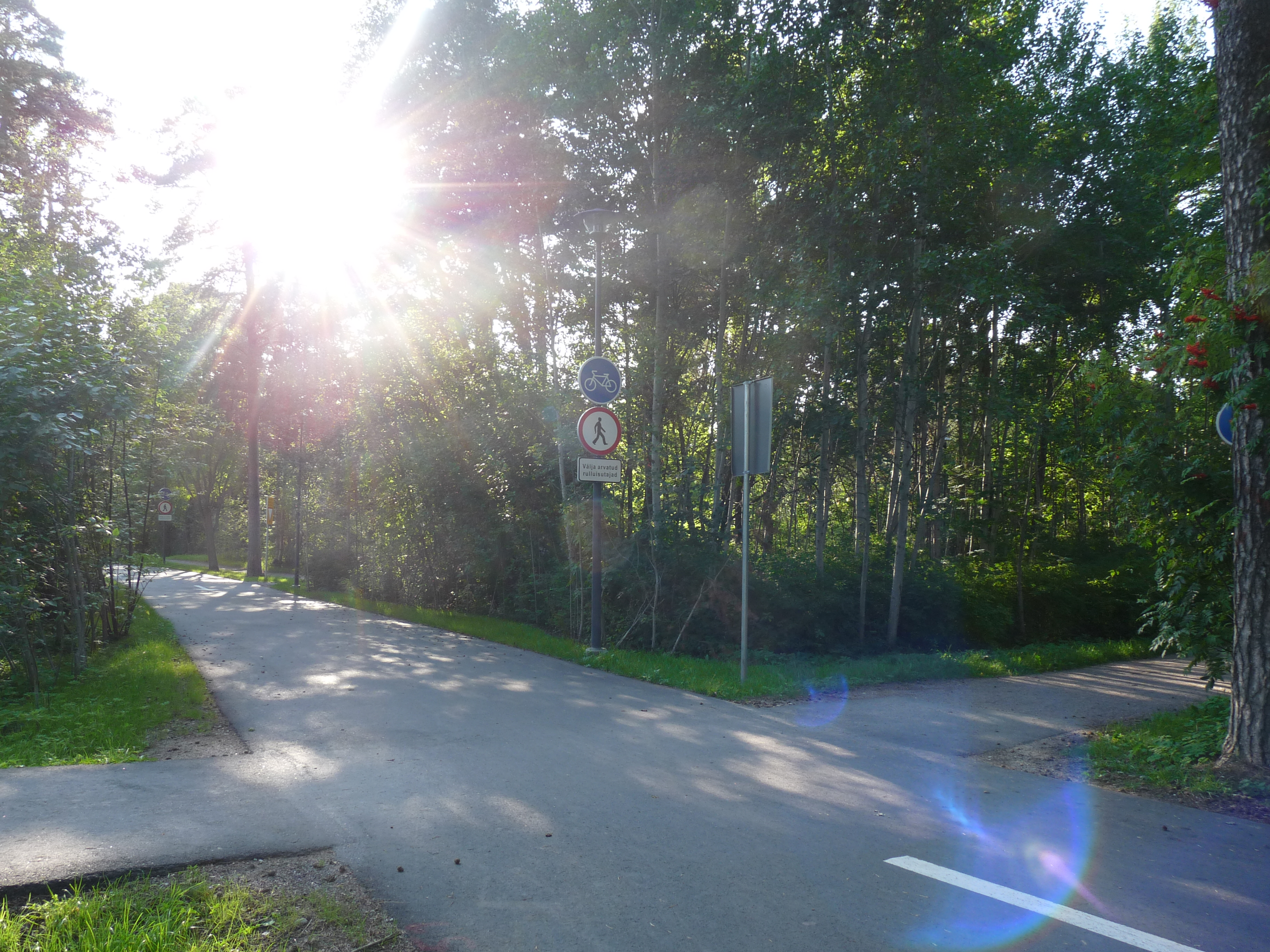
Cycle track

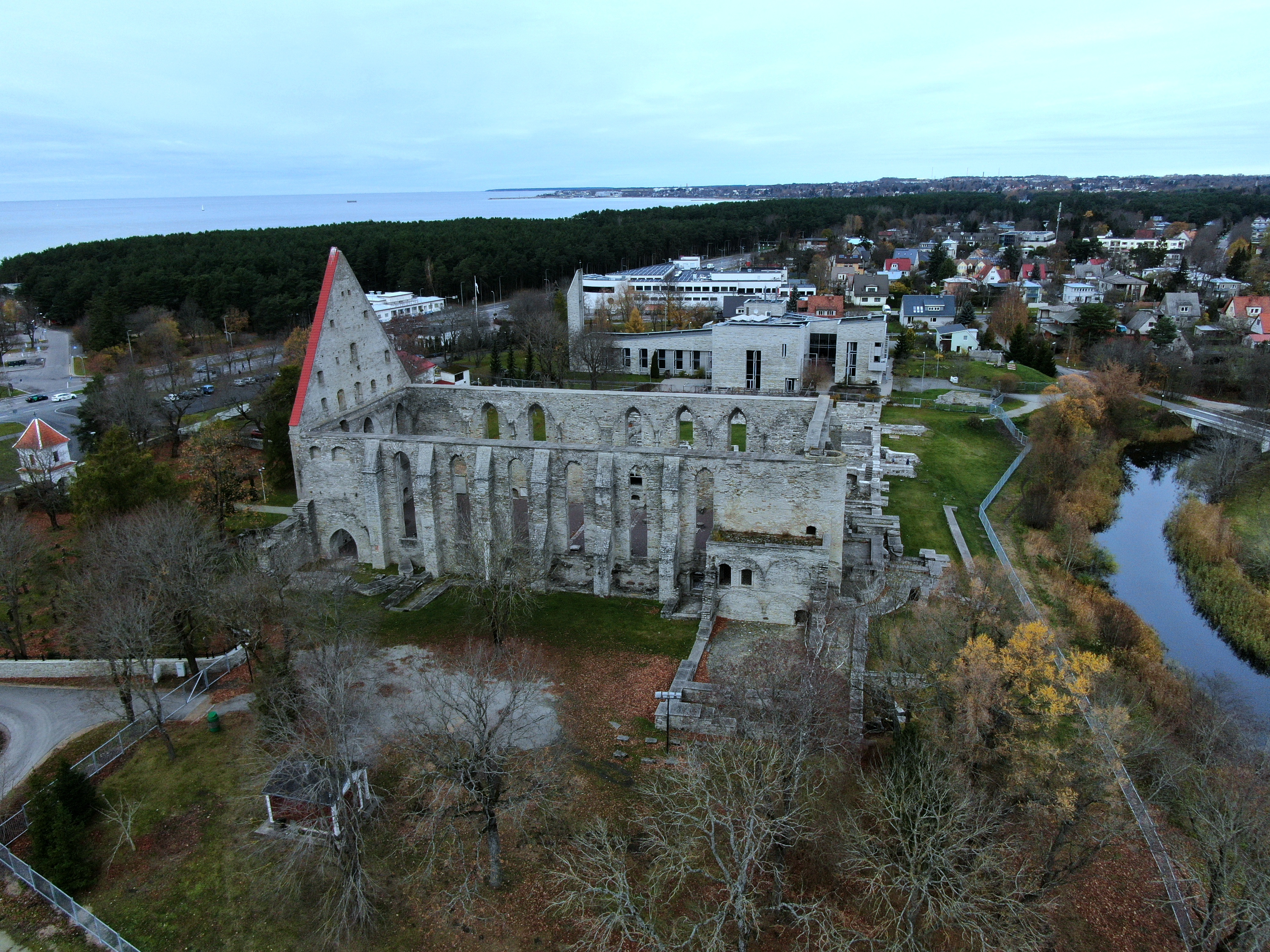
Pirita monastery
