= Kloostrimetsa =

Subdistrict of Tallinn, Estonia

Coordinates: 59.467397°N 24.863756°E

- Subdistrict of Tallinn
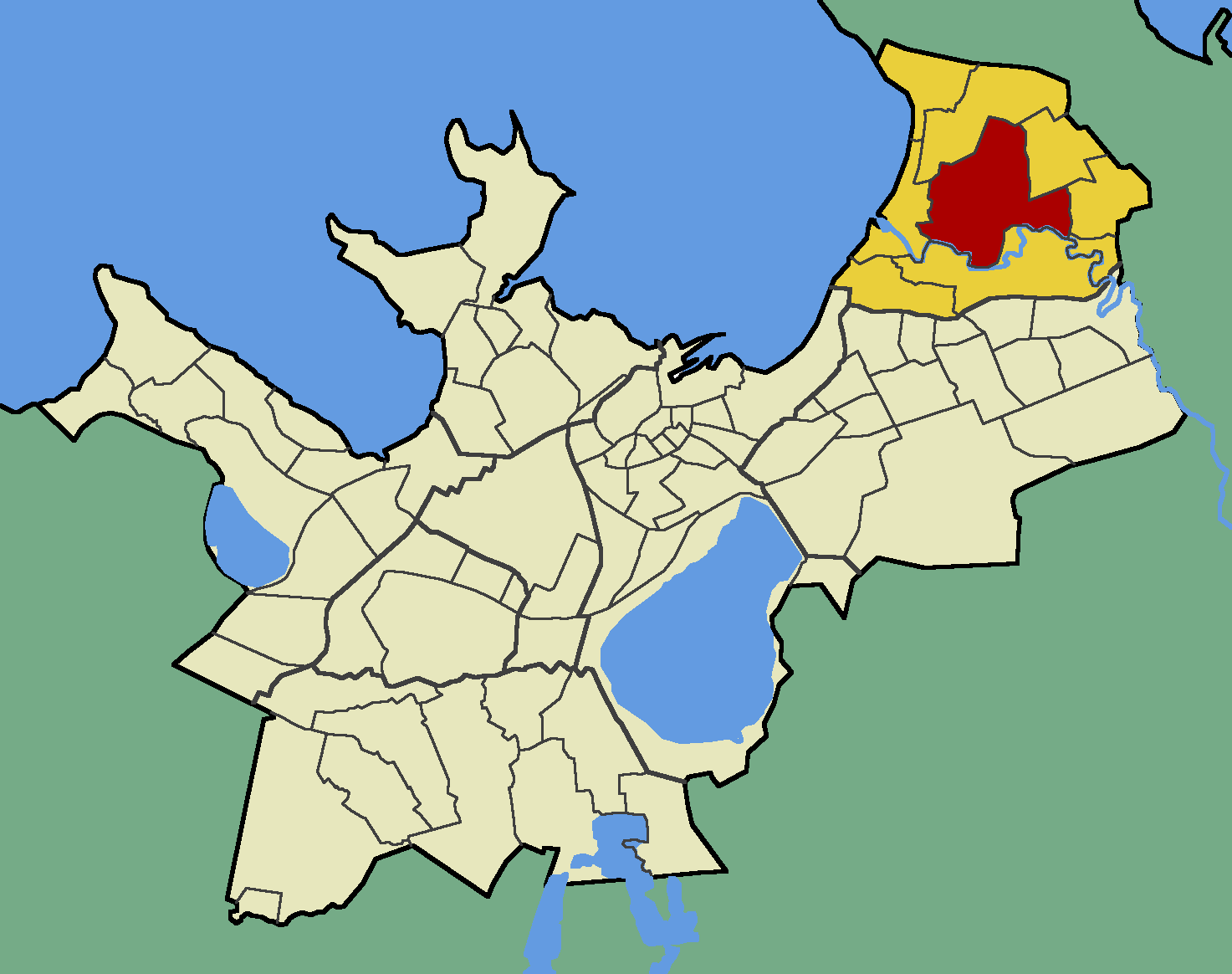
- Kloostrimetsa within Pirita District.
- Country: Estonia
- County: Harju County
- City: Tallinn
- District: Pirita

Population (01.01.2014)
  - Total: 80

Kloostrimetsa (Estonian for "Convent Forest") is a subdistrict (Estonian: asum) in the district of Pirita, Tallinn, the capital of Estonia. It's located north of the Pirita River and is mostly covered by the park forest Kloostrimets (Cloister Forest, which name comes from the nearby Pirita monastery). Kloostrimetsa has a population of 80 (as of 1 January 2014).

Tallinn Botanic Garden, Tallinn TV Tower, Metsakalmistu cemetery and Pirita-Kose-Kloostrimetsa Circuit are located in Kloostrimetsa.

== Gallery ==
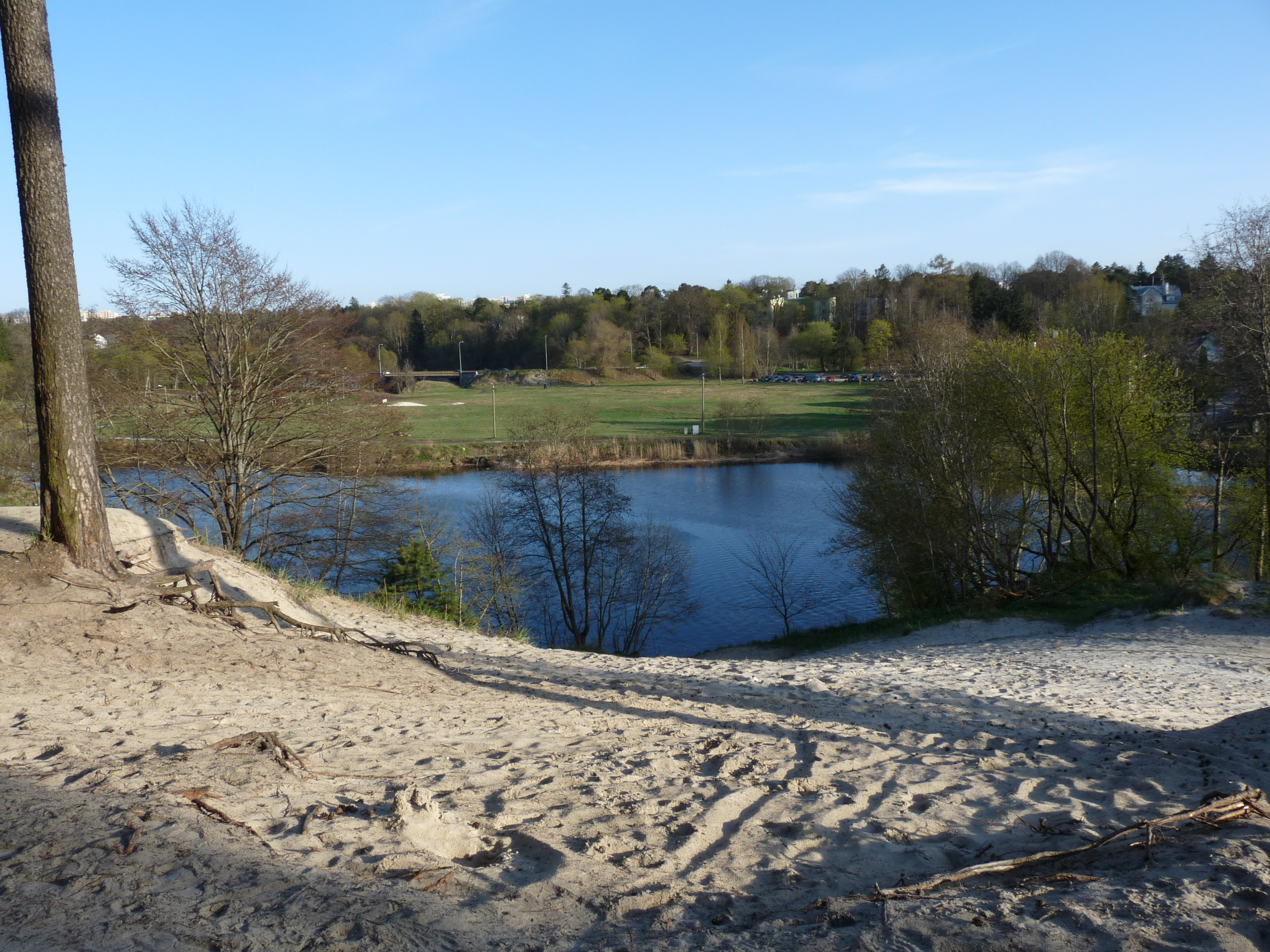
Pirita River

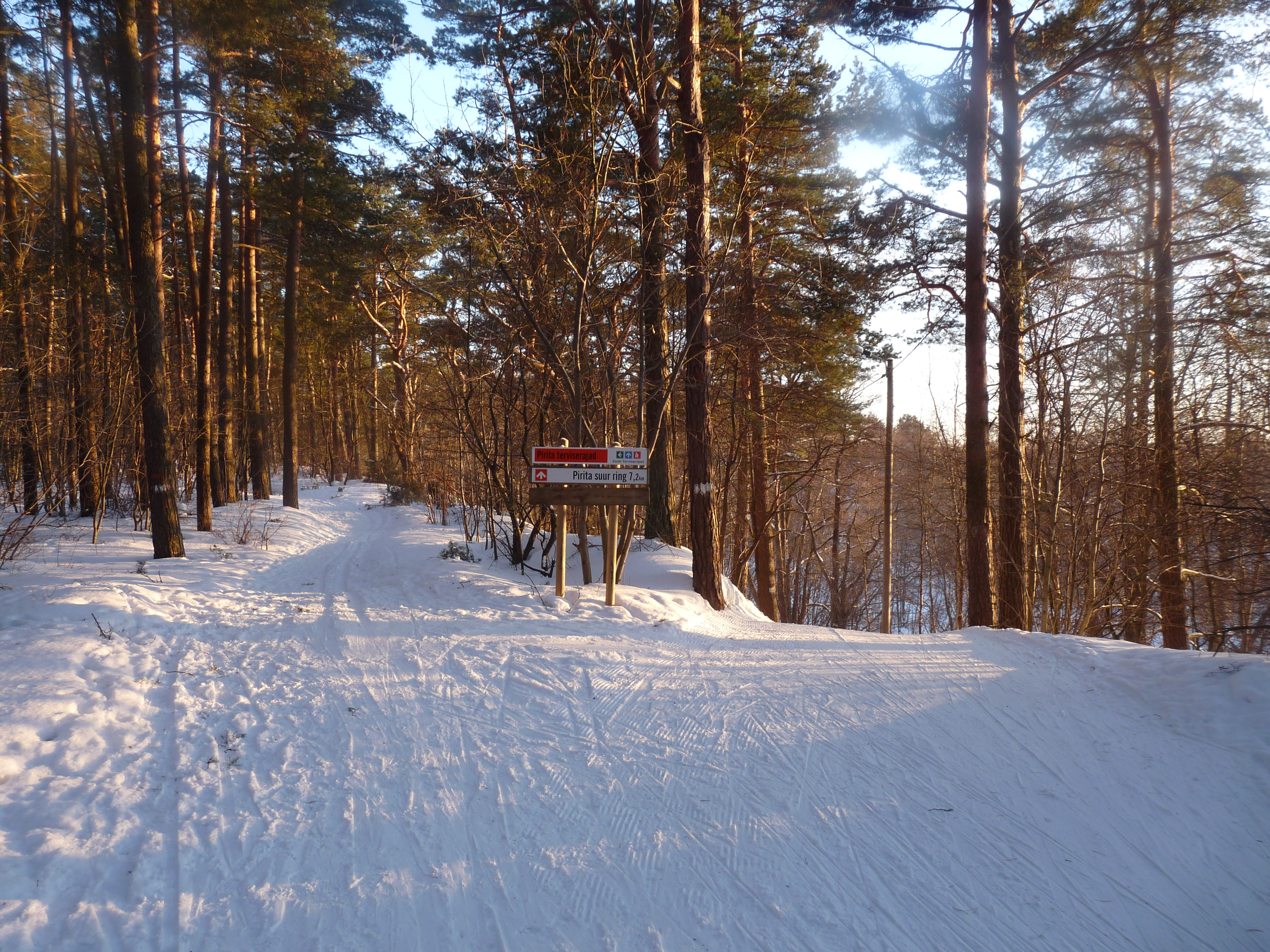
Kloostrimetsa forest in winter

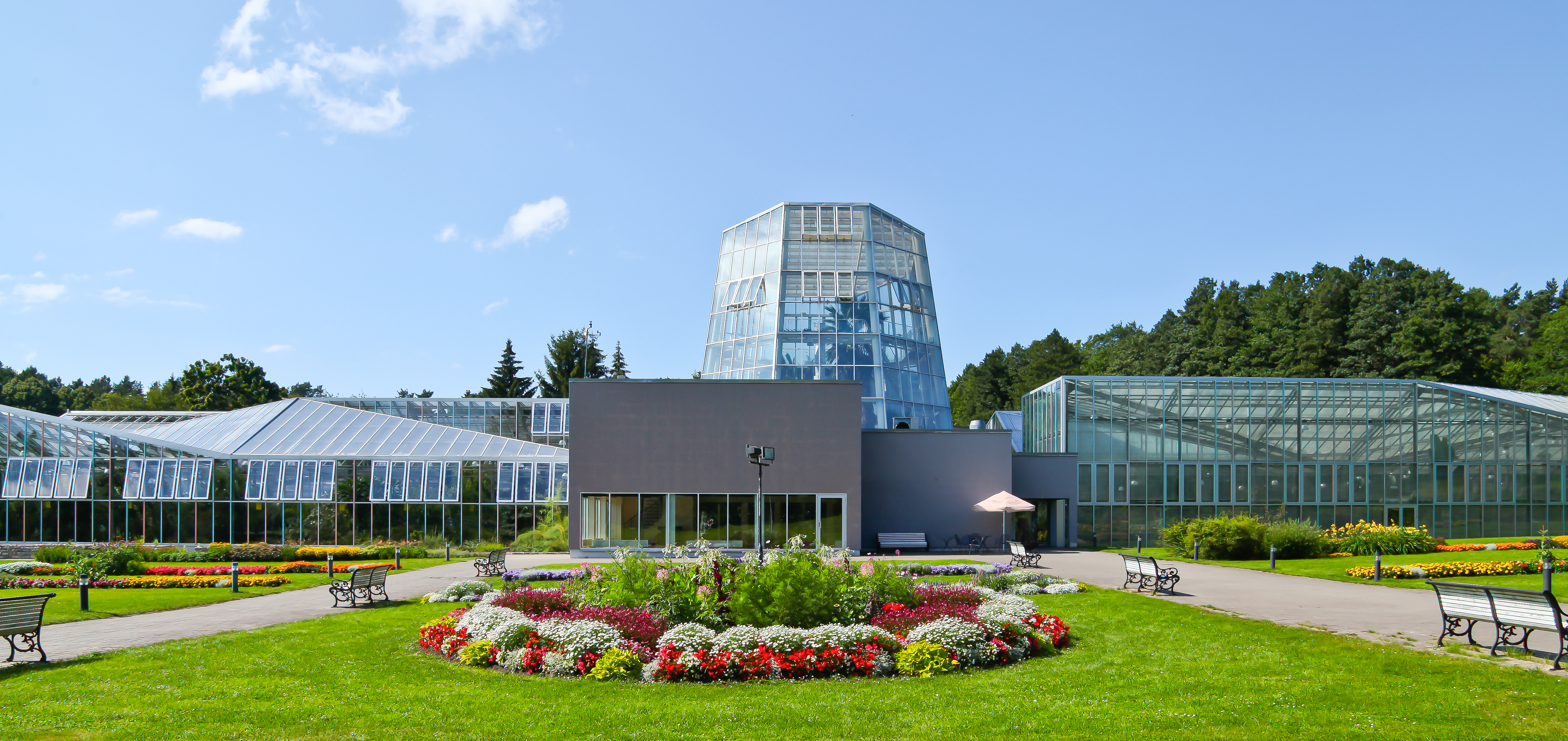
The main building of Tallinn Botanic Garden.

Chapel of Metsakalmistu cemetery.
