= Merivälja =

Subdistrict of Tallinn, Estonia

Coordinates: 59.492765°N 24.840624°E

- Subdistrict of Tallinn
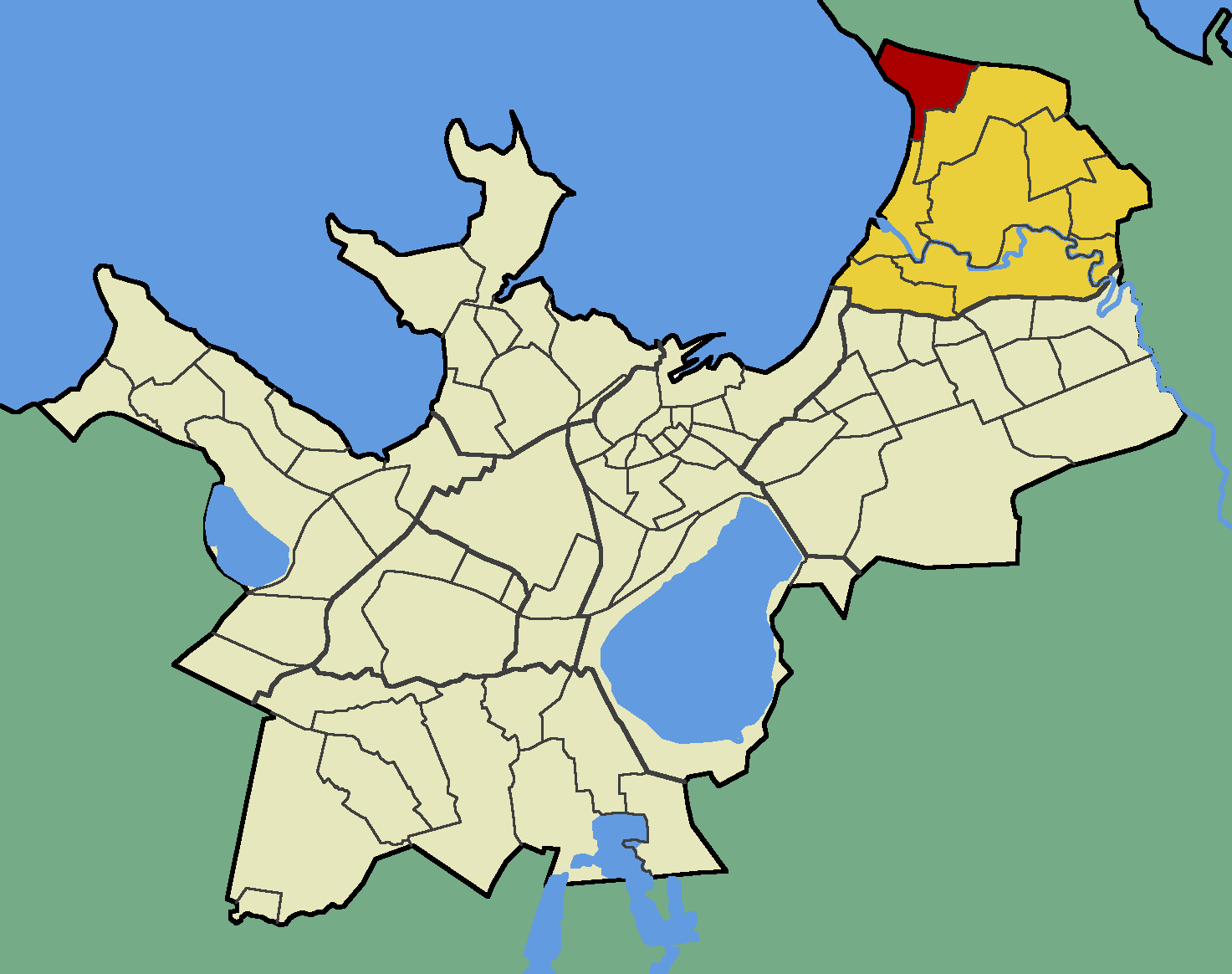
- Merivälja within Pirita District.
- Country: Estonia
- County: Harju County
- City: Tallinn
- District: Pirita

Population (01.01.2017)
  - Total: 3,088

Merivälja (Estonian for "Sea Field") is a subdistrict (Estonian: asum) in the district of Pirita, Tallinn, the capital of Estonia. It is located on the eastern coast of the Tallinn Bay, and is the northernmost subdistrict of Tallinn. Merivälja has a population of 3,088 (As of 1 January 2017). It is the wealthiest subdistrict of the district of Pirita.

== See also ==
- Pirita Beach

== Gallery ==
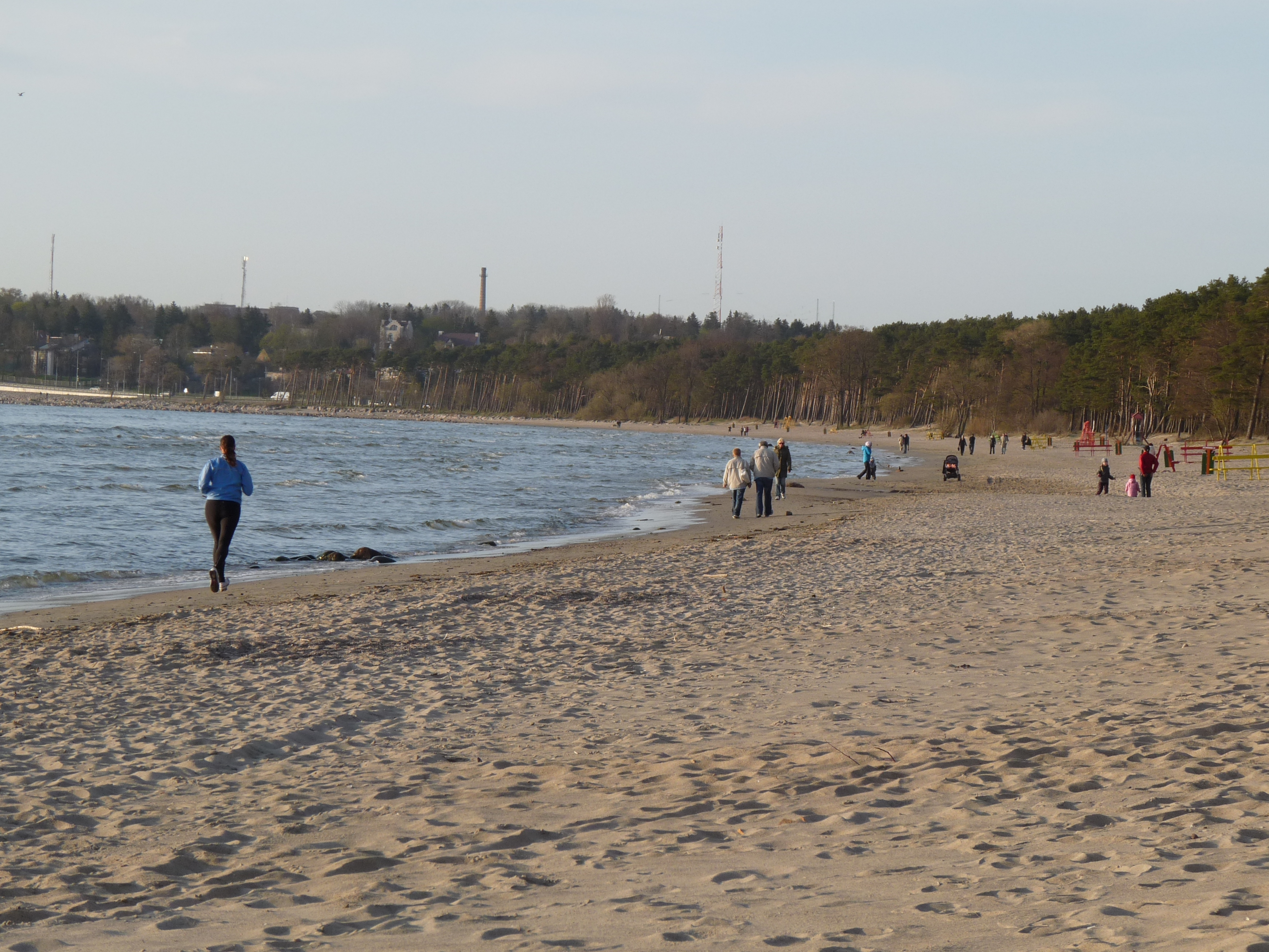
View to Merivälja from Pirita

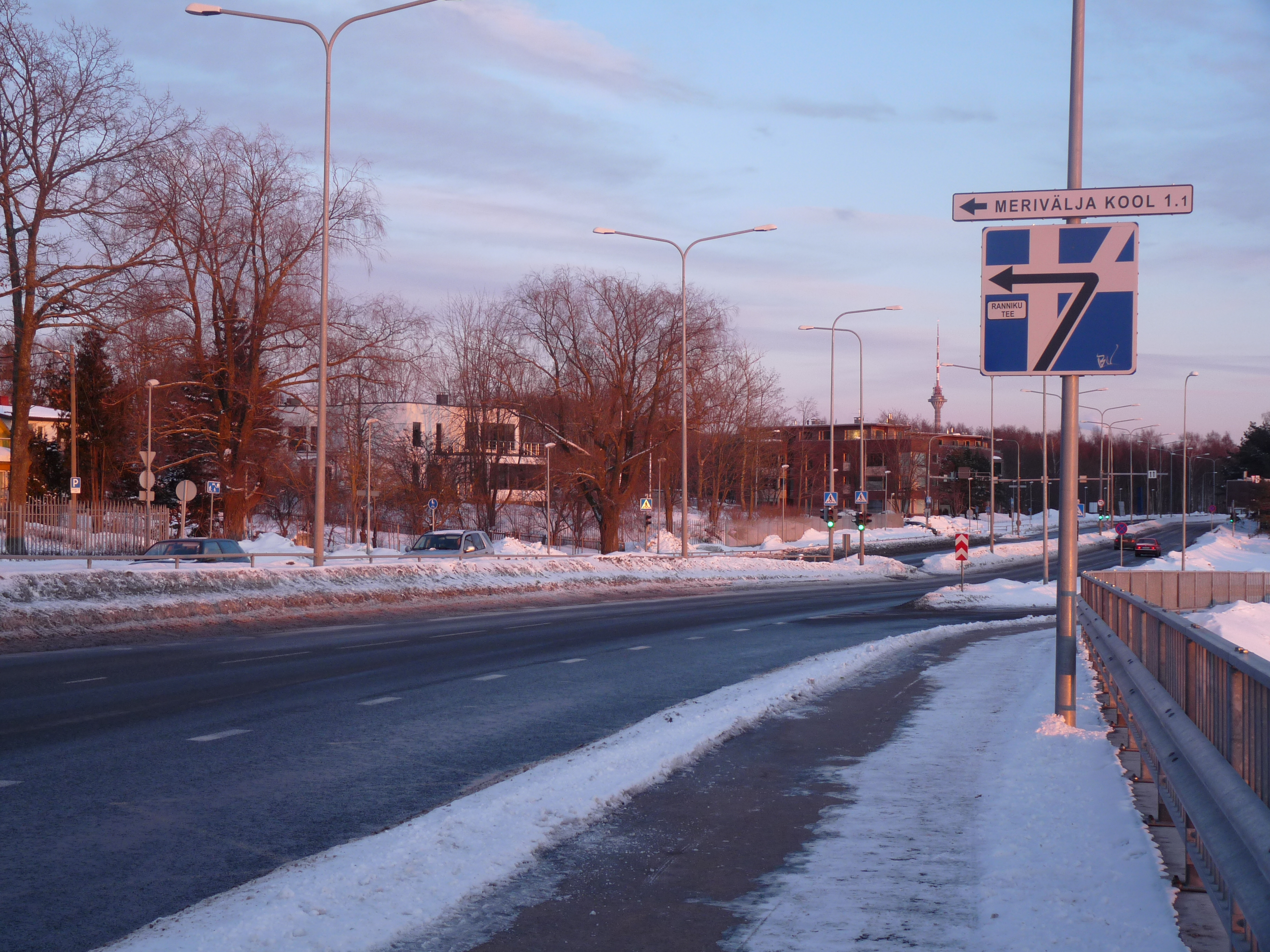
End of Pirita Beach

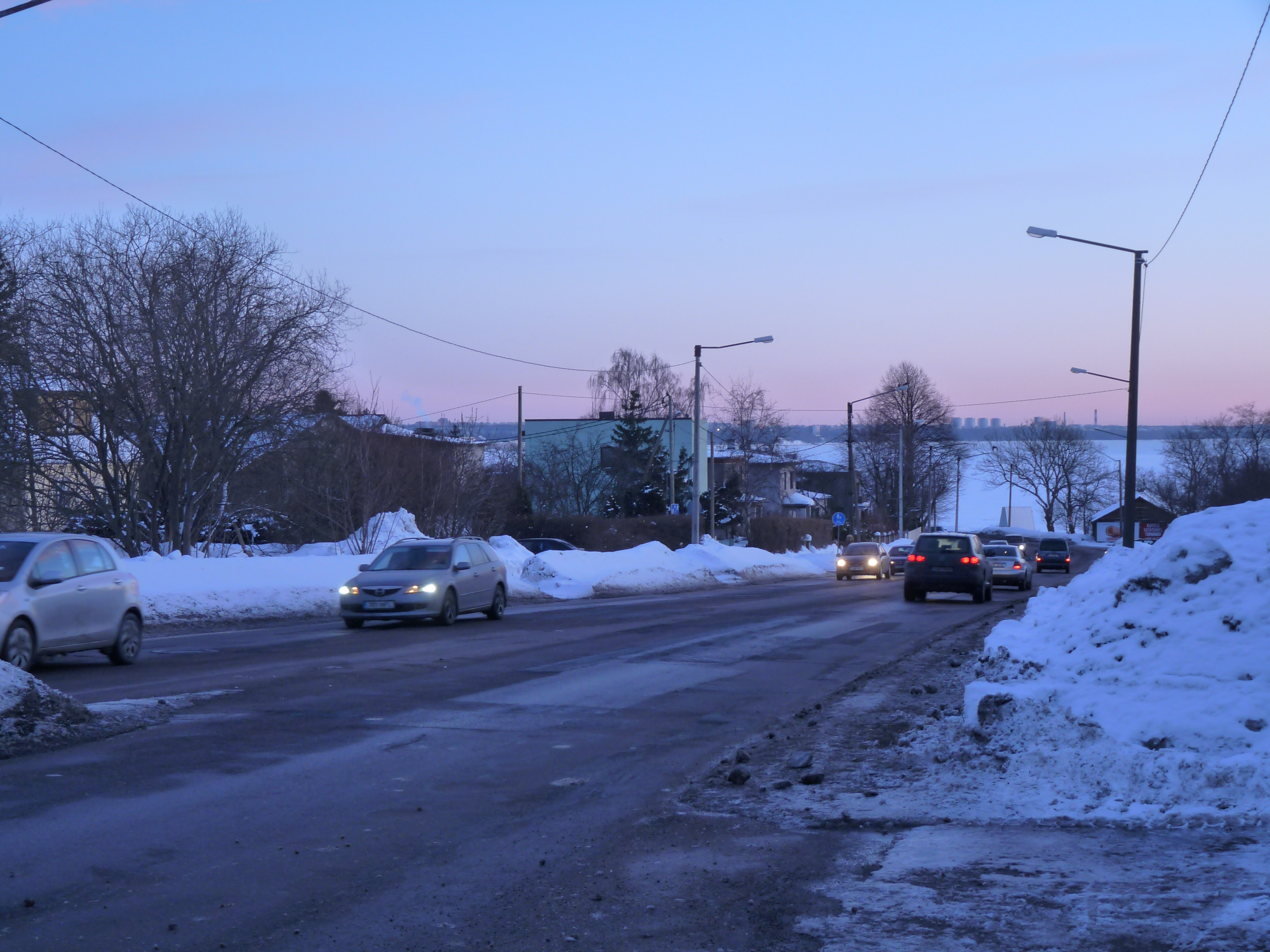
Downhill from Viimsi to Pirita

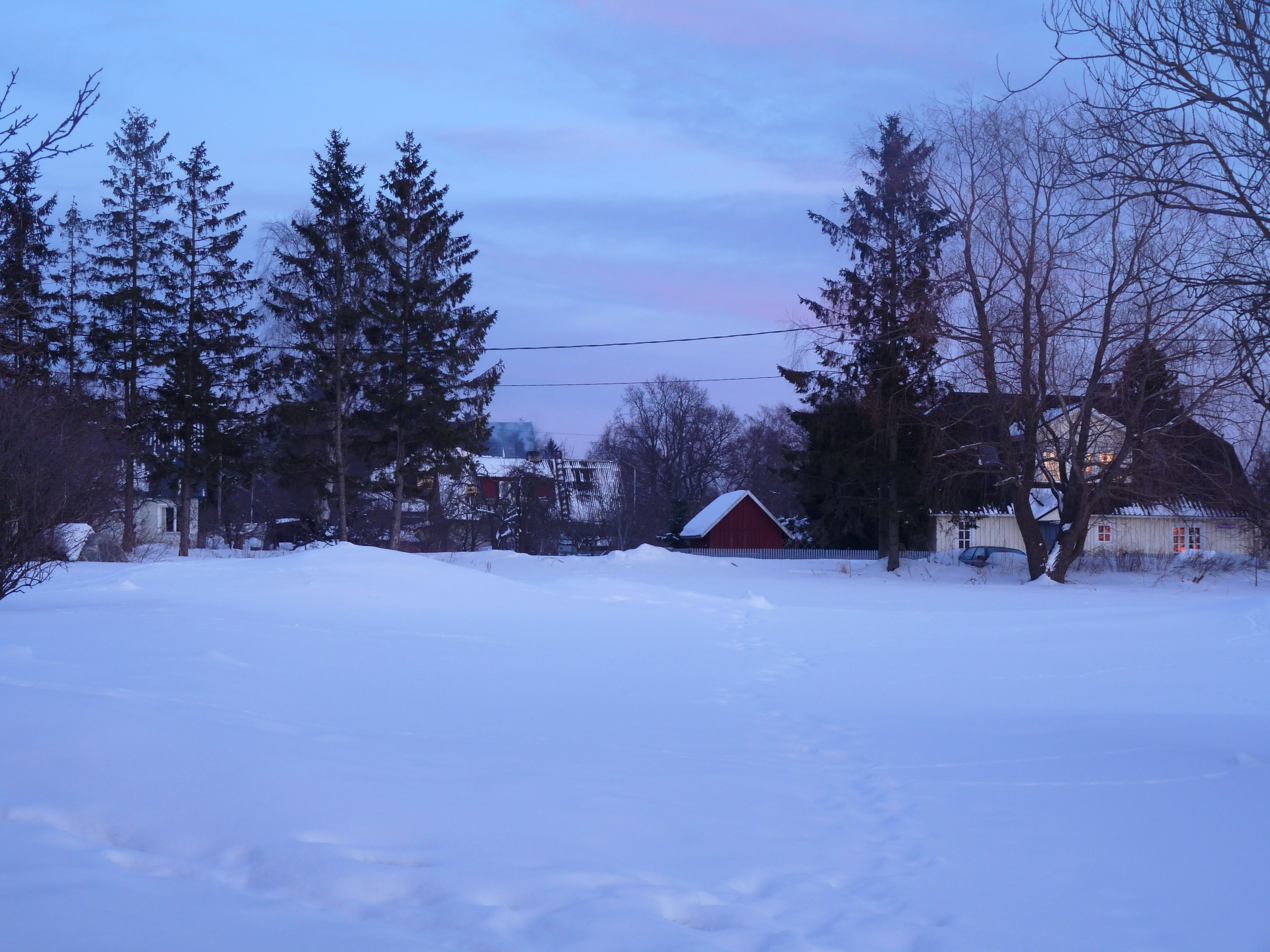

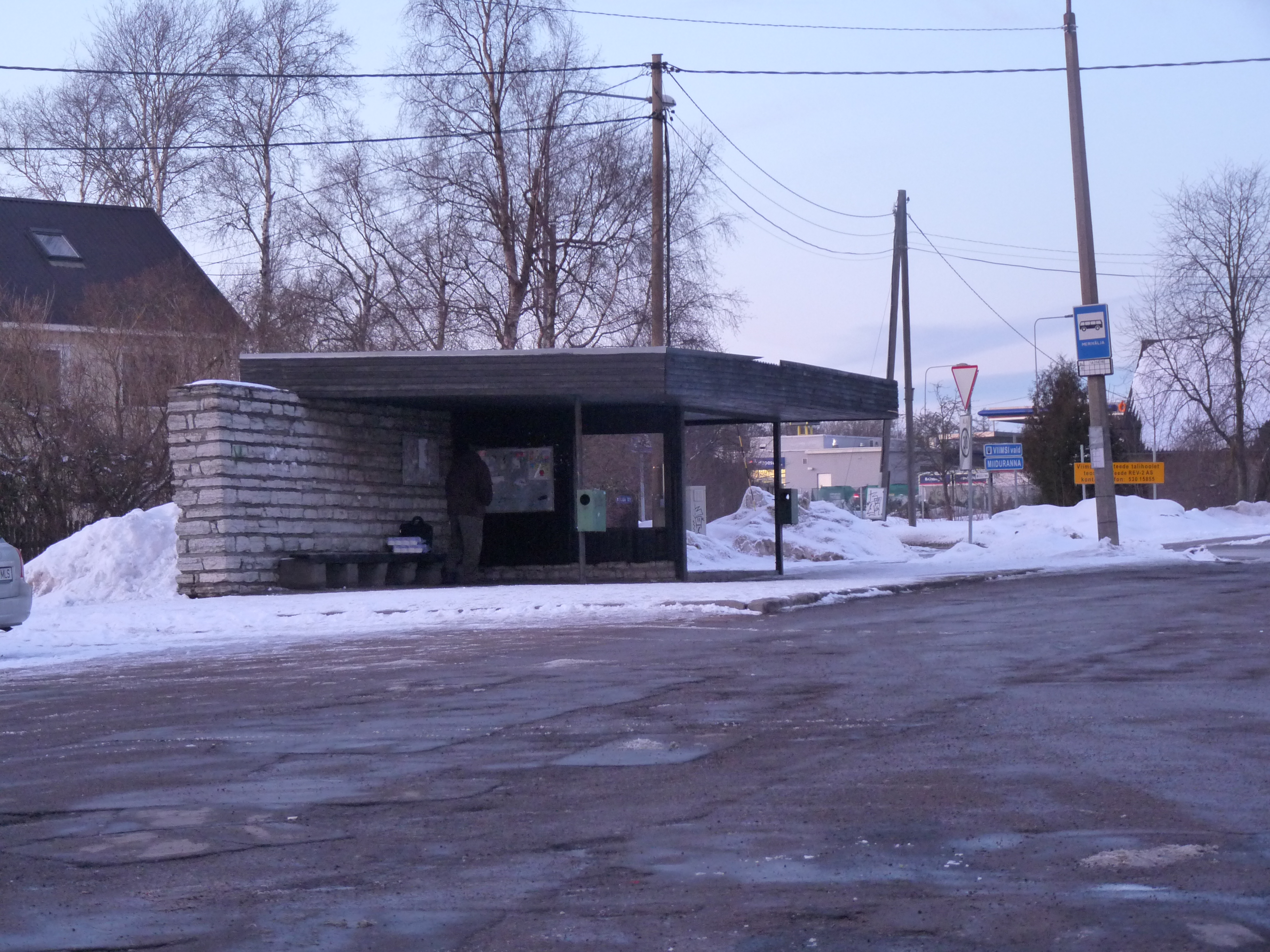

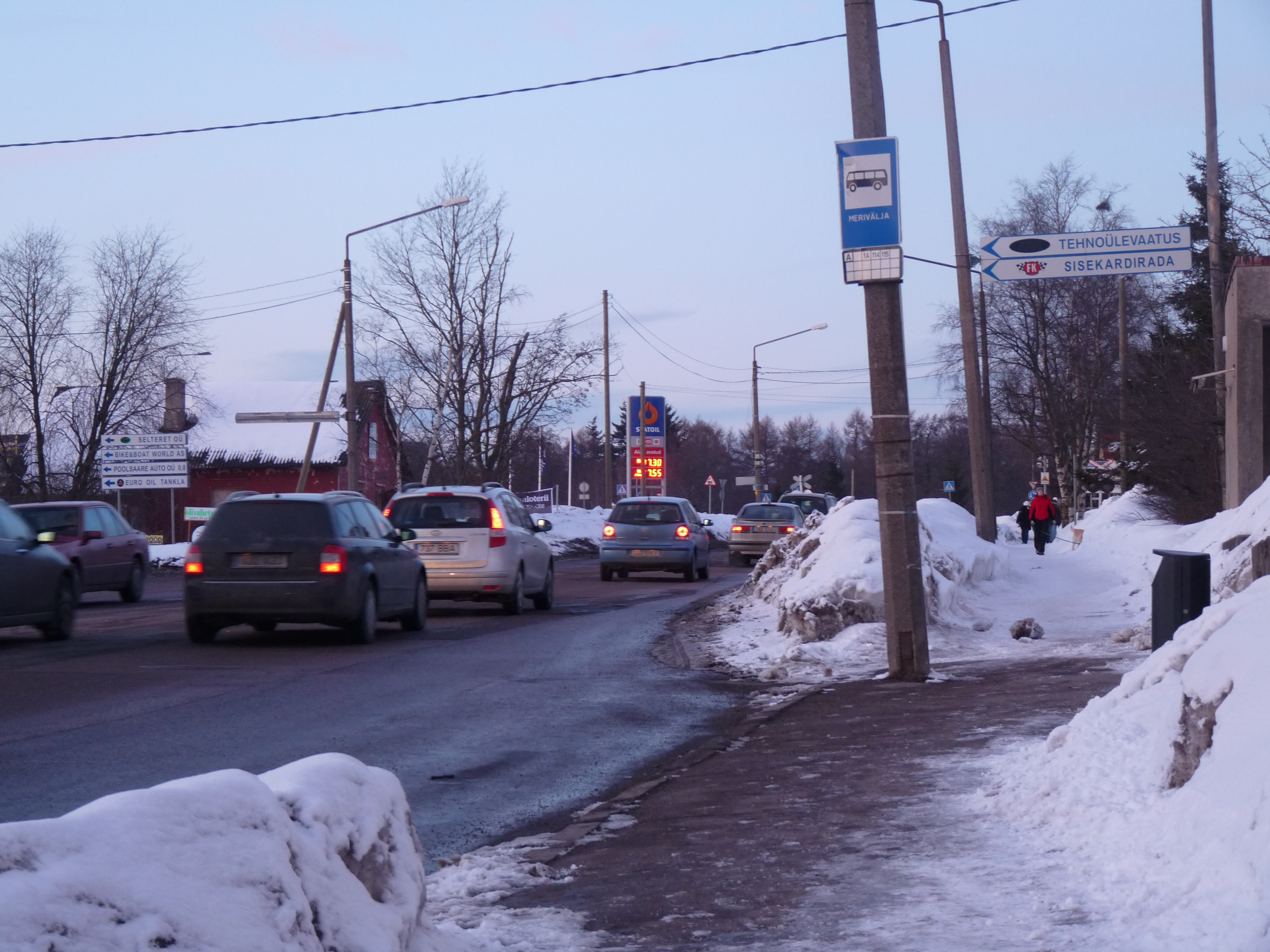
