= 2021 Estonian census =

Census in Estonia in 2021

The 2021 Population and Housing Census (PHC 2021) (Estonian: Rahva ja eluruumide loendus (REL 2021)) was a census that was carried out during 28 December 2021 – 22 January 2022 in Estonia by Statistics Estonia.

The total population recorded was 1,331,824 persons, compared to 1,294,455 persons counted in the 2011 Estonian census.

The 2021 Estonian census was based on data from official registers that were supplemented with information from a survey of a random sample of 60,000 people. The survey took place from 28 December 2021 to 22 January 2022.

== See also ==
- Demographics of Estonia
