= Pirita convent =

Monastery in Tallinn; now in ruins

Coordinates: 59°28′00″N 24°50′10″E

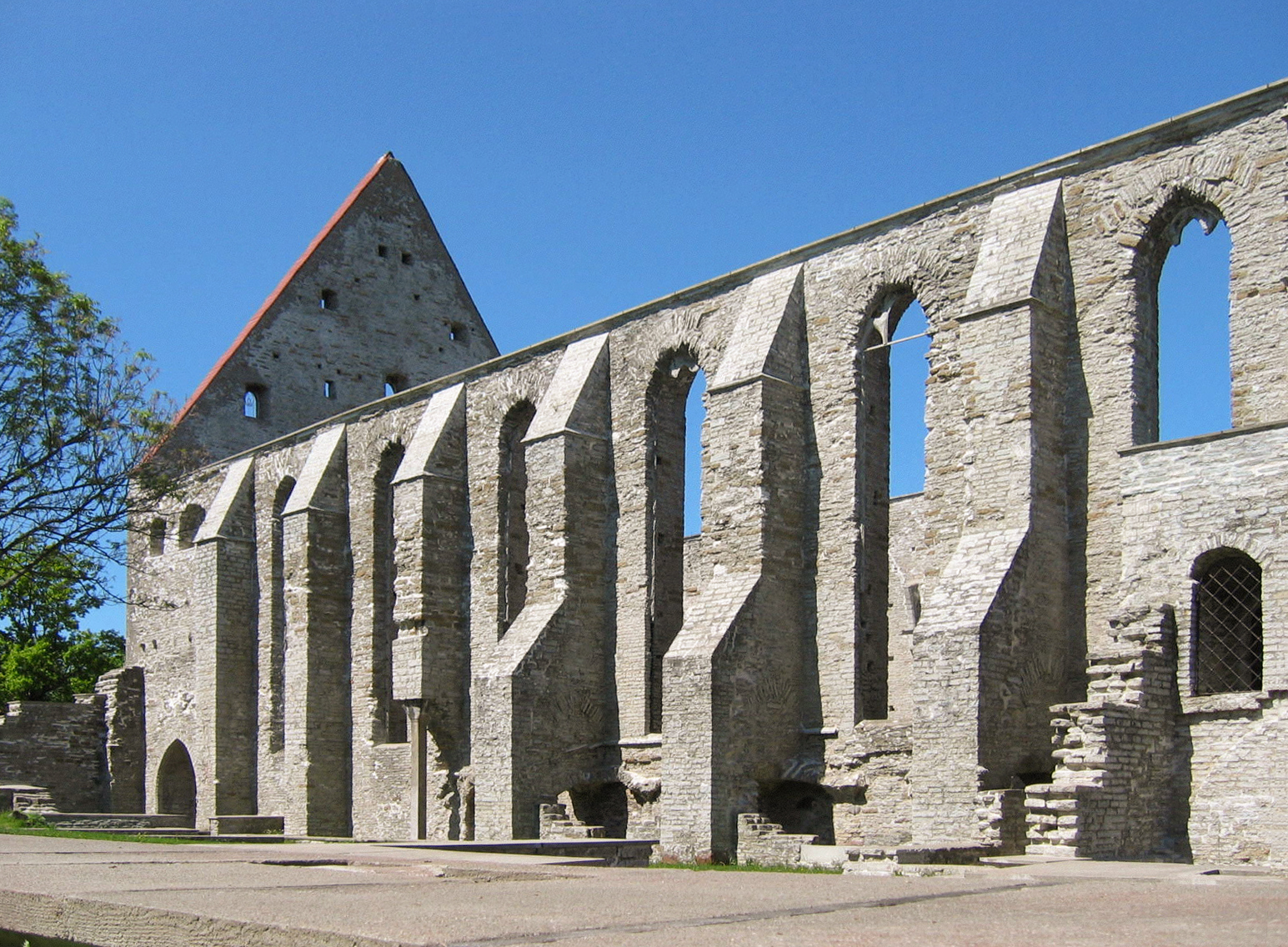
Ruins of Bridgettine convent

Pirita Convent (Estonian: Pirita klooster) was a Bridgettine convent for both nuns and monks, located in the district of Pirita in Tallinn, Estonia. It functioned from 1407 to 1575. It was the largest convent in Livonia, and with a floor area of 1360 square meters, it was the largest church building in Medieval Estonia.

== History ==
The idea of founding the monastery dates to merchants (H. Huxer, G. Kruse, H. Swalbart) of Tallinn of around 1400. In 1407, two monks from Vadstena Abbey arrived in Tallinn to counsel the merchants. The first permit to break dolomite for building the complex was acquired in 1417. The convent was constructed under the supervision of the architect Heinrich Swalbart.

The main church of the monastery was consecrated on 15 August 1436 by the Bishop of Tallinn, Heinrich II. Several of the merchants who had originally proposed the monastery later became its monks. During its heyday, Pirita Convent became the largest Catholic monastery in Livonia.

The decline of the convent started after the adoption of the Protestant reformation in Estonia in 1525, although it was allowed to continue to function. During the Livonian War in 1577, Pirita Convent was attacked by Russian troops under the leadership of Ivan the Terrible. They sacked the monastery, looted its riches and burned it down. Pirita Convent has been abandoned since then, but local people used adjacent lands as a cemetery.

== See also ==
- List of Christian religious houses in Estonia

== Sources ==
- "Pirita klooster AD MMI-MMXI." Toimetus: Ema Riccarda, Lagle Parek, Vello Salo, Ilmo Au. Illustreeritud. – Tallinn, Pirita klooster 2001. 80 lk. ISBN 978-9949-21-998-8
