= List of Michelin-starred restaurants in Tokyo =

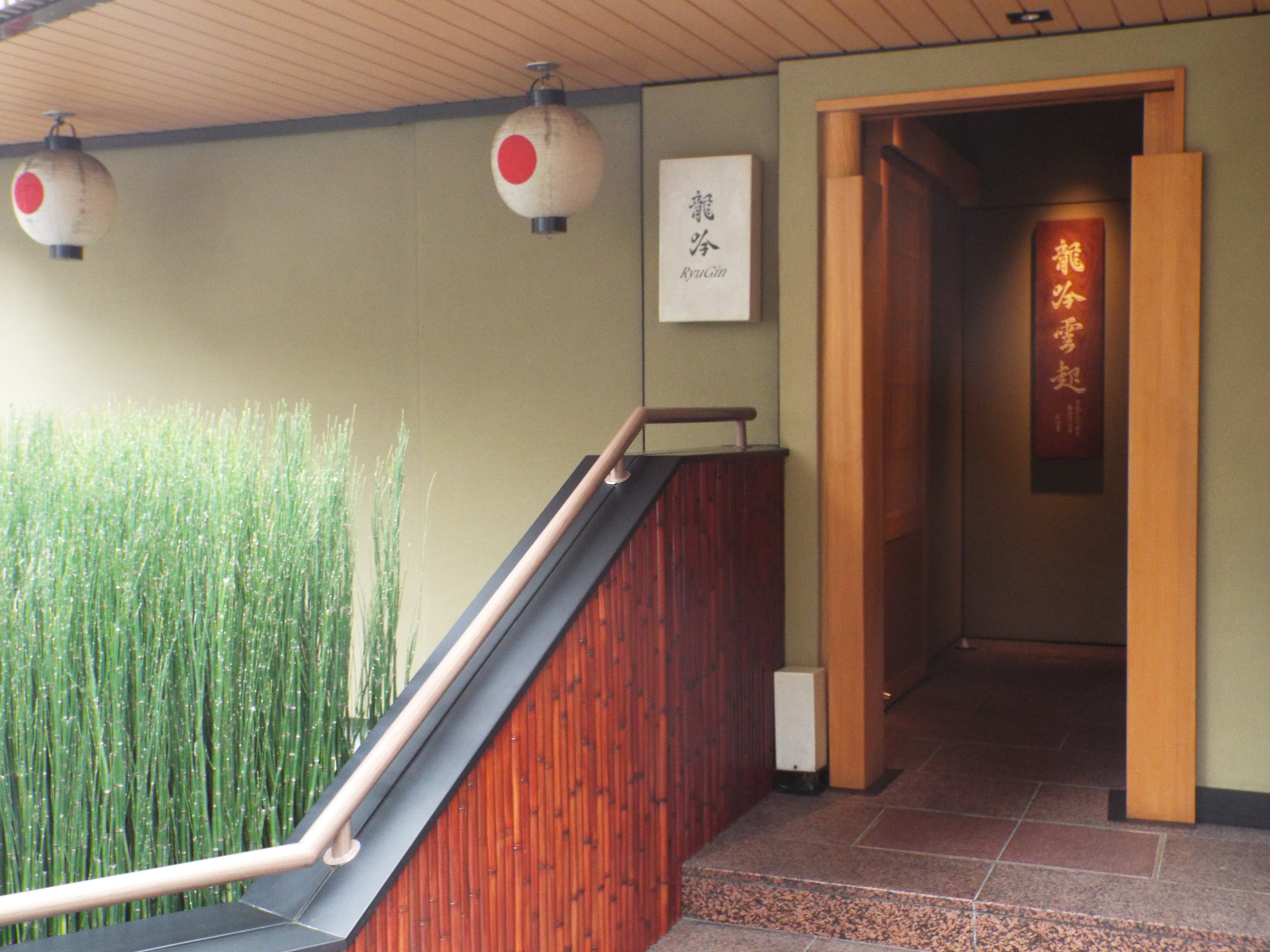
Nihonryori Ryugin

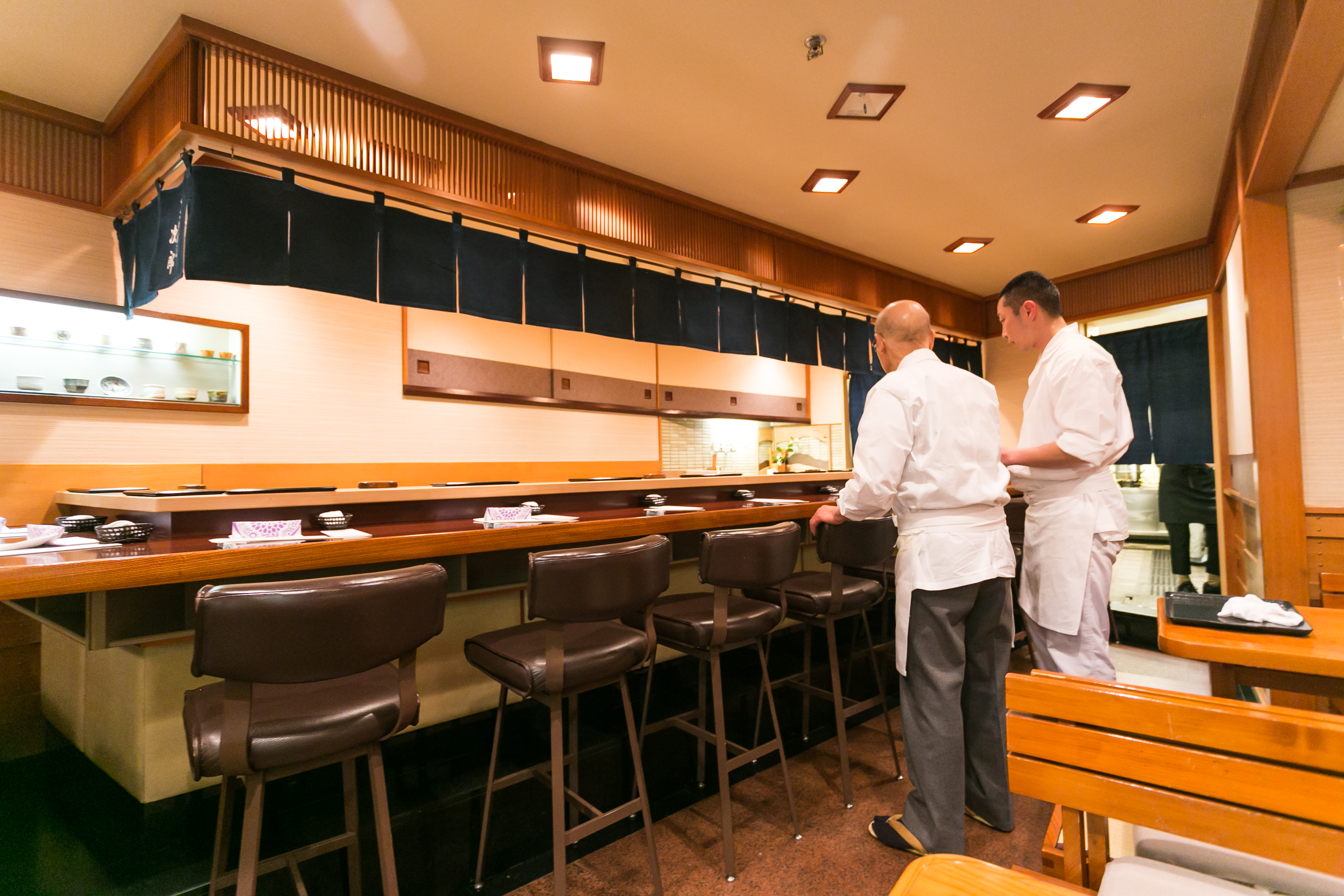
Sukiyabashi Jiro

As of the 2026 Michelin Guide, there are 160 restaurants in the Greater Tokyo Area with a Michelin star rating.

The Michelin Guides have been published by the French tire company Michelin since 1900. They were designed as a guide to tell drivers about eateries they recommended to visit and to subtly sponsor their tires, by encouraging drivers to use their cars more and therefore need to replace the tires as they wore out. Over time, the stars that were given out started to become more valuable.

The Michelin Guide first entered the Japanese market with a list covering Tokyo, debuting in November 2007 and published as the 2008 guide. Michelin would expand its coverage in Japan by issuing standalone guides for other regions in the country in later years, as well as adding regions to be reviewed as part of the Tokyo guide. Between 2011 and 2014, the Tokyo guide also assessed restaurants in Yokohama, before discontinuing reviewing that city.

Multiple anonymous Michelin inspectors visit the restaurants several times. They rate the restaurants on five criteria: "quality of products", "mastery of flavor and cooking techniques", "the personality of the chef represented in the dining experience", "value for money", and "consistency between inspectors' visits". Inspectors have at least ten years of expertise and create a list of popular restaurants supported by media reports, reviews, and diner popularity. If they reach a consensus, Michelin awards restaurants from one to three stars based on its evaluation methodology: One star means "high-quality cooking, worth a stop", two stars signify "excellent cooking, worth a detour", and three stars denote "exceptional cuisine, worth a special journey". The stars are not permanent and restaurants are constantly being re-evaluated. If the criteria are not met, the restaurant will lose its stars.

== Lists ==
Key
1 Michelin star	One Michelin star
2 Michelin stars	Two Michelin stars
3 Michelin stars	Three Michelin stars
—	The restaurant did not receive a star that year
Closed	The restaurant is no longer open

=== 2021–2026 ===
Michelin-starred restaurants
Name	Cuisine	Location	2021	2022	2023	2024	2025	2026
Akasaka Kikunoi	Japanese	Tokyo – Minato	2 Michelin stars	2 Michelin stars	2 Michelin stars	2 Michelin stars	2 Michelin stars	2 Michelin stars
Asahina Gastronome	French	Tokyo – Chūō	1 Michelin star	2 Michelin stars	2 Michelin stars	2 Michelin stars	2 Michelin stars	2 Michelin stars
Au Deco	French	Tokyo – Shibuya	1 Michelin star	1 Michelin star	1 Michelin star	1 Michelin star	1 Michelin star	1 Michelin star
Azabu Yukimura	Japanese	Tokyo – Minato	2 Michelin stars	—	—	—	—	—
Beige	French	Tokyo – Chūō	2 Michelin stars	2 Michelin stars	2 Michelin stars	2 Michelin stars	1 Michelin star	1 Michelin star
Chugoku Hanten Amber Palace	Chinese	Tokyo – Chiyoda	1 Michelin star	1 Michelin star	1 Michelin star	1 Michelin star	1 Michelin star	—
Chugoku Hanten Fureika	Chinese	Tokyo – Minato	1 Michelin star	1 Michelin star	1 Michelin star	1 Michelin star	1 Michelin star	—
Crony	French	Tokyo – Minato	—	2 Michelin stars	2 Michelin stars	2 Michelin stars	2 Michelin stars	2 Michelin stars
Daigo	Japanese	Tokyo – Minato	2 Michelin stars	2 Michelin stars	2 Michelin stars	1 Michelin star	1 Michelin star	1 Michelin star
Den	Japanese	Tokyo – Shibuya	2 Michelin stars	2 Michelin stars	2 Michelin stars	2 Michelin stars	2 Michelin stars	2 Michelin stars
Dominique Bouchet	French	Tokyo – Chūō	1 Michelin star	1 Michelin star	1 Michelin star	1 Michelin star	1 Michelin star	1 Michelin star
Édition Koji Shimomura	French	Tokyo – Minato	2 Michelin stars	2 Michelin stars	2 Michelin stars	1 Michelin star	1 Michelin star	1 Michelin star
Ensui	Japanese	Tokyo – Meguro	—	1 Michelin star	1 Michelin star	1 Michelin star	1 Michelin star	2 Michelin stars
Esquisse	French	Tokyo – Chūō	2 Michelin stars	2 Michelin stars	2 Michelin stars	2 Michelin stars	2 Michelin stars	2 Michelin stars
Florilège	French	Tokyo – Minato	2 Michelin stars	2 Michelin stars	2 Michelin stars	2 Michelin stars	2 Michelin stars	2 Michelin stars
Ginza Hachigo	Ramen	Tokyo – Chūō	1 Michelin star	1 Michelin star	1 Michelin star	—	—	—
Ginza Fukuju	Japanese	Tokyo – Chūō	2 Michelin stars	2 Michelin stars	2 Michelin stars	2 Michelin stars	2 Michelin stars	2 Michelin stars
Ginza Koju	Japanese	Tokyo – Chūō	2 Michelin stars	2 Michelin stars	2 Michelin stars	2 Michelin stars	2 Michelin stars	2 Michelin stars
Ginza Okuda	Japanese	Tokyo – Chūō	1 Michelin star	1 Michelin star	1 Michelin star	1 Michelin star	1 Michelin star	—
Ginza Shinohara	Japanese	Tokyo – Chūō	2 Michelin stars	2 Michelin stars	2 Michelin stars	2 Michelin stars	2 Michelin stars	2 Michelin stars
Ginza Toyoda	Japanese	Tokyo – Chūō	1 Michelin star	1 Michelin star	1 Michelin star	1 Michelin star	1 Michelin star	—
Goryukubo	Japanese	Tokyo – Minato	1 Michelin star	—	—	—	—	—
Hakuun	Japanese	Tokyo – Minato	—	1 Michelin star	1 Michelin star	1 Michelin star	1 Michelin star	2 Michelin stars
Harutaka	Japanese	Tokyo – Chūō	2 Michelin stars	2 Michelin stars	2 Michelin stars	3 Michelin stars	3 Michelin stars	3 Michelin stars
Higashiazabu Amamoto (Note: Restaurant lost its stars in 2024 following restricting its booking access for the general public)	Japanese	Tokyo – Minato	2 Michelin stars	2 Michelin stars	2 Michelin stars	—	—	—
Hommage	French	Tokyo – Taito	2 Michelin stars	2 Michelin stars	2 Michelin stars	2 Michelin stars	2 Michelin stars	2 Michelin stars
Jingumae Higuchi	Japanese	Tokyo – Shibuya	2 Michelin stars	2 Michelin stars	2 Michelin stars	2 Michelin stars	2 Michelin stars	2 Michelin stars
Joël Robuchon Tokyo	French	Tokyo – Meguro	3 Michelin stars	3 Michelin stars	3 Michelin stars	3 Michelin stars	3 Michelin stars	3 Michelin stars
Jushu	Japanese	Tokyo – Minato	2 Michelin stars	2 Michelin stars	1 Michelin star	1 Michelin star	1 Michelin star	1 Michelin star
Kadowaki	Japanese	Tokyo – Minato	3 Michelin stars	3 Michelin stars	3 Michelin stars	3 Michelin stars	3 Michelin stars	3 Michelin stars
Kagurazaka Ishikawa	Japanese	Tokyo – Shinjuku	3 Michelin stars	3 Michelin stars	3 Michelin stars	3 Michelin stars	3 Michelin stars	3 Michelin stars
Kaiseki Komuro	Japanese	Tokyo – Shinjuku	2 Michelin stars	2 Michelin stars	2 Michelin stars	1 Michelin star	1 Michelin star	—
Kaiseki Tsujitome	Japanese	Tokyo – Minato	2 Michelin stars	2 Michelin stars	1 Michelin star	1 Michelin star	—	—
Kanda	Japanese	Tokyo – Minato	3 Michelin stars	3 Michelin stars	3 Michelin stars	3 Michelin stars	3 Michelin stars	3 Michelin stars
Kioicho Fukudaya	Japanese	Tokyo – Chiyoda	2 Michelin stars	2 Michelin stars	2 Michelin stars	2 Michelin stars	2 Michelin stars	2 Michelin stars
Kobikicho Tomoki (Note: Restaurant lost its stars in 2025 following restricting its booking access for the general public)	Japanese	Tokyo – Chūō	2 Michelin stars	2 Michelin stars	2 Michelin stars	2 Michelin stars	—	—
Kohaku	Japanese	Tokyo – Shinjuku	3 Michelin stars	3 Michelin stars	3 Michelin stars	3 Michelin stars	3 Michelin stars	2 Michelin stars
Konjiki Hototogisu	Ramen	Tokyo – Shinjuku	1 Michelin star	1 Michelin star	1 Michelin star	—	—	—
Kutan	Japanese	Tokyo – Chūō	2 Michelin stars	2 Michelin stars	2 Michelin stars	2 Michelin stars	2 Michelin stars	2 Michelin stars
L'Aube	French	Tokyo – Minato	1 Michelin star	1 Michelin star	1 Michelin star	1 Michelin star	1 Michelin star	—
L'Atelier de Joël Robuchon	French	Tokyo – Minato	2 Michelin stars	2 Michelin stars	1 Michelin star	1 Michelin star	1 Michelin star	1 Michelin star
L'Effervescence	French	Tokyo – Minato	3 Michelin stars	3 Michelin stars	3 Michelin stars	3 Michelin stars	3 Michelin stars	3 Michelin stars
L'Osier	French	Tokyo – Chūō	3 Michelin stars	3 Michelin stars	3 Michelin stars	3 Michelin stars	3 Michelin stars	3 Michelin stars
La Table de Joël Robuchon	French	Tokyo – Meguro	2 Michelin stars	2 Michelin stars	2 Michelin stars	2 Michelin stars	1 Michelin star	1 Michelin star
Le Mange-Tout	French	Tokyo – Meguro	2 Michelin stars	1 Michelin star	1 Michelin star	—	—	—
Makimura	Japanese	Tokyo – Shinagawa	3 Michelin stars	3 Michelin stars	3 Michelin stars	3 Michelin stars	—	—
Makiyaki Ginza Onodera	French	Tokyo – Chūō	1 Michelin star	1 Michelin star	1 Michelin star	1 Michelin star	1 Michelin star	1 Michelin star
MAZ	Innovative	Tokyo – Chiyoda	—	—	—	2 Michelin stars	2 Michelin stars	2 Michelin stars
Myojaku	Japanese	Tokyo – Minato	—	—	2 Michelin stars	2 Michelin stars	2 Michelin stars	3 Michelin stars
Nabeno-Ism	French	Tokyo – Taito	2 Michelin stars	2 Michelin stars	2 Michelin stars	2 Michelin stars	1 Michelin star	1 Michelin star
Nakiryū	Ramen	Tokyo – Toshima	1 Michelin star	1 Michelin star	1 Michelin star	—	—	—
Narisawa	Innovative	Tokyo – Minato	2 Michelin stars	2 Michelin stars	2 Michelin stars	2 Michelin stars	2 Michelin stars	2 Michelin stars
Nihombashi Kakigaracho Sugita	Japanese	Tokyo – Chūō	1 Michelin star	2 Michelin stars	2 Michelin stars	—	—	—
Nishiazabu Sushi Shin	Japanese	Tokyo – Minato	1 Michelin star	1 Michelin star	1 Michelin star	1 Michelin star	1 Michelin star	2 Michelin stars
Nishiazabu Taku	Japanese	Tokyo – Minato	1 Michelin star	1 Michelin star	1 Michelin star	1 Michelin star	1 Michelin star	1 Michelin star
Okamoto	Japanese	Tokyo – Chūō	2 Michelin stars	1 Michelin star	1 Michelin star	1 Michelin star	1 Michelin star	—
Oryori Miyasaka	Japanese	Tokyo – Minato	2 Michelin stars	—	—	—	—	—
Pierre Gagnaire Tokyo	French	Tokyo – Minato	2 Michelin stars	2 Michelin stars	2 Michelin stars	2 Michelin stars	2 Michelin stars	Closed
Prisma	Italian	Tokyo – Minato	2 Michelin stars	2 Michelin stars	2 Michelin stars	2 Michelin stars	2 Michelin stars	2 Michelin stars
Quintessence	French	Tokyo – Shinagawa	3 Michelin stars	3 Michelin stars	3 Michelin stars	3 Michelin stars	3 Michelin stars	3 Michelin stars
Ryugin	Japanese	Tokyo – Minato	3 Michelin stars	3 Michelin stars	3 Michelin stars	3 Michelin stars	3 Michelin stars	3 Michelin stars
Ryuzu	French	Tokyo – Minato	2 Michelin stars	2 Michelin stars	2 Michelin stars	2 Michelin stars	2 Michelin stars	2 Michelin stars
Sant Pau Tokyo	Spanish	Tokyo – Chūō	1 Michelin star	1 Michelin star	1 Michelin star	Closed		
Sawada	Japanese	Tokyo – Chūō	2 Michelin stars	2 Michelin stars	2 Michelin stars	—	—	—
Sazenka	Chinese	Tokyo – Minato	3 Michelin stars	3 Michelin stars	3 Michelin stars	3 Michelin stars	3 Michelin stars	3 Michelin stars
Seisoka	Japanese	Tokyo – Minato	2 Michelin stars	2 Michelin stars	2 Michelin stars	2 Michelin stars	1 Michelin star	1 Michelin star
Seizan	Japanese	Tokyo – Minato	2 Michelin stars	2 Michelin stars	2 Michelin stars	2 Michelin stars	2 Michelin stars	2 Michelin stars
Sézanne	French	Tokyo – Chiyoda	—	1 Michelin star	2 Michelin stars	2 Michelin stars	3 Michelin stars	3 Michelin stars
Shinbashi Sasada	Japanese	Tokyo – Minato	1 Michelin star	1 Michelin star	1 Michelin star	1 Michelin star	1 Michelin star	1 Michelin star
Sukiyabashi Jiro Roppongiten	Japanese	Tokyo – Minato	2 Michelin stars	2 Michelin stars	2 Michelin stars	2 Michelin stars	2 Michelin stars	2 Michelin stars
Sushi Kanesaka	Japanese	Tokyo – Chūō	2 Michelin stars	2 Michelin stars	2 Michelin stars	2 Michelin stars	2 Michelin stars	2 Michelin stars
Sushi Kimura (Note: Restaurant lost its stars in 2023 following restricting its booking access for the general public)	Japanese	Tokyo – Setagaya	2 Michelin stars	2 Michelin stars	—	—	—	—
Sushi Yoshitake	Japanese	Tokyo – Chūō	3 Michelin stars	3 Michelin stars	3 Michelin stars	2 Michelin stars	—	—
Tamawarai	Soba	Tokyo – Shibuya	1 Michelin star	1 Michelin star	1 Michelin star	1 Michelin star	—	—
Tempura Ginya	Japanese	Tokyo – Minato	2 Michelin stars	2 Michelin stars	2 Michelin stars	2 Michelin stars	2 Michelin stars	1 Michelin star
Tempura Kondo	Japanese	Tokyo – Chūō	2 Michelin stars	2 Michelin stars	2 Michelin stars	2 Michelin stars	2 Michelin stars	2 Michelin stars
Tempura Motoyoshi	Japanese	Tokyo – Shibuya	1 Michelin star	1 Michelin star	1 Michelin star	1 Michelin star	2 Michelin stars	2 Michelin stars
Tentempura Uchitsu	Japanese	Tokyo – Shibuya	2 Michelin stars	2 Michelin stars	2 Michelin stars	1 Michelin star	1 Michelin star	—
Usukifugu Yamadaya	Seafood	Tokyo – Minato	2 Michelin stars	2 Michelin stars	2 Michelin stars	2 Michelin stars	Closed	
Waketokuyama	Japanese	Tokyo – Minato	1 Michelin star	1 Michelin star	1 Michelin star	1 Michelin star	1 Michelin star	1 Michelin star
Yuan Yamori	Soba	Tokyo – Chūō	1 Michelin star	1 Michelin star	1 Michelin star	1 Michelin star	—	—
Yunke	Korean	Tokyo – Chūō	1 Michelin star	Closed				
Zurriola	Spanish	Tokyo – Chūō	2 Michelin stars	2 Michelin stars	2 Michelin stars	2 Michelin stars	2 Michelin stars	1 Michelin star
Reference(s)								

=== 2011–2020 ===
Michelin-starred restaurants
Name	Cuisine	Location	2011	2012	2013	2014	2015	2016	2017	2018	2019	2020
7 Chome Kyoboshi	Japanese	Tokyo – Chūō	3 Michelin stars	3 Michelin stars	3 Michelin stars	2 Michelin stars	—	—	—	—	—	—
Aimee Vibert	French	Tokyo – Chūō	2 Michelin stars	2 Michelin stars	1 Michelin star	1 Michelin star	—	—	—	—	—	—
Ajiman	Seafood	Tokyo – Minato	2 Michelin stars	2 Michelin stars	2 Michelin stars	2 Michelin stars	2 Michelin stars	2 Michelin stars	2 Michelin stars	2 Michelin stars	—	—
Akasaka Kikunoi	Japanese	Tokyo – Minato	2 Michelin stars	2 Michelin stars	2 Michelin stars	2 Michelin stars	2 Michelin stars	2 Michelin stars	2 Michelin stars	2 Michelin stars	2 Michelin stars	2 Michelin stars
Araki	Japanese	Tokyo – Chūō	3 Michelin stars	3 Michelin stars	Closed (Note: Relocated to London in 2014)							
Argento Aso	Italian	Tokyo – Chūō	2 Michelin stars	1 Michelin star	1 Michelin star	1 Michelin star	1 Michelin star	Closed				
Azabu Yukimura	Japanese	Tokyo – Minato	3 Michelin stars	3 Michelin stars	3 Michelin stars	3 Michelin stars	3 Michelin stars	3 Michelin stars	3 Michelin stars	3 Michelin stars	3 Michelin stars	3 Michelin stars
Beige	French	Tokyo – Chūō	1 Michelin star	2 Michelin stars	1 Michelin star	1 Michelin star	1 Michelin star	2 Michelin stars	2 Michelin stars	2 Michelin stars	2 Michelin stars	2 Michelin stars
Chugoku Hanten Fureika	Chinese	Tokyo – Minato	2 Michelin stars	2 Michelin stars	1 Michelin star	1 Michelin star	1 Michelin star	1 Michelin star	1 Michelin star	1 Michelin star	1 Michelin star	1 Michelin star
Crescent	French	Tokyo – Minato	2 Michelin stars	2 Michelin stars	2 Michelin stars	2 Michelin stars	2 Michelin stars	2 Michelin stars	2 Michelin stars	2 Michelin stars	1 Michelin star	1 Michelin star
Cuisine[s] Michel Troisgros	French	Tokyo – Shinjuku	2 Michelin stars	2 Michelin stars	2 Michelin stars	2 Michelin stars	2 Michelin stars	2 Michelin stars	2 Michelin stars	2 Michelin stars	2 Michelin stars	Closed
Daigo	Japanese	Tokyo – Minato	2 Michelin stars	2 Michelin stars	2 Michelin stars	2 Michelin stars	2 Michelin stars	2 Michelin stars	2 Michelin stars	2 Michelin stars	2 Michelin stars	2 Michelin stars
Den	Japanese	Tokyo – Shibuya	1 Michelin star	2 Michelin stars	2 Michelin stars	1 Michelin star	1 Michelin star	1 Michelin star	—	2 Michelin stars	2 Michelin stars	2 Michelin stars
Dominique Bouchet	French	Tokyo – Chūō	—	—	—	2 Michelin stars	—	2 Michelin stars	2 Michelin stars	2 Michelin stars	2 Michelin stars	2 Michelin stars
Édition Koji Shimomura	French	Tokyo – Minato	—	2 Michelin stars	2 Michelin stars	2 Michelin stars	2 Michelin stars	2 Michelin stars	2 Michelin stars	2 Michelin stars	2 Michelin stars	2 Michelin stars
Esaki	Japanese	Tokyo – Shibuya	3 Michelin stars	3 Michelin stars	3 Michelin stars	3 Michelin stars	3 Michelin stars	3 Michelin stars	Closed (Note: Lost stars in 2017 and relocated/rebranded in Sep 2018 as Yatsugatake Esaki)			
Esquisse	French	Tokyo – Chūō	—	—	2 Michelin stars	2 Michelin stars	2 Michelin stars	2 Michelin stars	2 Michelin stars	2 Michelin stars	2 Michelin stars	2 Michelin stars
Florilège	French	Tokyo – Minato	—	—	—	—	—	1 Michelin star	1 Michelin star	2 Michelin stars	2 Michelin stars	2 Michelin stars
Fugu Fukuji	Seafood	Tokyo – Chūō	2 Michelin stars	2 Michelin stars	—	—	—	—	—	—	—	—
Ginza Fukuju	Japanese	Tokyo – Chūō	2 Michelin stars	2 Michelin stars	2 Michelin stars	2 Michelin stars	2 Michelin stars	2 Michelin stars	2 Michelin stars	2 Michelin stars	2 Michelin stars	2 Michelin stars
Ginza Ichigo	Japanese	Tokyo – Chūō	1 Michelin star	1 Michelin star	1 Michelin star	1 Michelin star	2 Michelin stars	2 Michelin stars	2 Michelin stars	2 Michelin stars	1 Michelin star	1 Michelin star
Ginza Koju	Japanese	Tokyo – Chūō	3 Michelin stars	3 Michelin stars	3 Michelin stars	3 Michelin stars	2 Michelin stars	2 Michelin stars	2 Michelin stars	2 Michelin stars	2 Michelin stars	2 Michelin stars
Ginza Okuda	Japanese	Tokyo – Chūō	—	2 Michelin stars	2 Michelin stars	2 Michelin stars	1 Michelin star	1 Michelin star	1 Michelin star	1 Michelin star	1 Michelin star	1 Michelin star
Ginza Shinohara	Japanese	Tokyo – Chūō	—	—	—	—	—	—	—	1 Michelin star	1 Michelin star	2 Michelin stars
Ginza Toyoda	Japanese	Tokyo – Chūō	2 Michelin stars	2 Michelin stars	2 Michelin stars	2 Michelin stars	2 Michelin stars	2 Michelin stars	2 Michelin stars	2 Michelin stars	2 Michelin stars	1 Michelin star
Goryukubo	Japanese	Tokyo – Minato	—	—	—	2 Michelin stars	2 Michelin stars	2 Michelin stars	2 Michelin stars	2 Michelin stars	2 Michelin stars	2 Michelin stars
Hamadaya	Japanese	Tokyo – Chūō	3 Michelin stars	3 Michelin stars	2 Michelin stars	2 Michelin stars	2 Michelin stars	2 Michelin stars	2 Michelin stars	2 Michelin stars	—	—
Harutaka	Japanese	Tokyo – Chūō	2 Michelin stars	—	—	—	2 Michelin stars	—	—	—	2 Michelin stars	2 Michelin stars
Hatsunezushi (Note: Restaurant lost its stars in 2021 following restricting its booking access for the general public)	Japanese	Tokyo – Ota	2 Michelin stars	2 Michelin stars	2 Michelin stars	2 Michelin stars	2 Michelin stars	2 Michelin stars	2 Michelin stars	2 Michelin stars	2 Michelin stars	2 Michelin stars
Hifumian	Japanese	Tokyo – Bunkyo	1 Michelin star	2 Michelin stars	2 Michelin stars	2 Michelin stars	2 Michelin stars	1 Michelin star	—	—	—	—
Higashiazabu Amamoto	Japanese	Tokyo – Minato	—	—	—	—	—	—	2 Michelin stars	2 Michelin stars	2 Michelin stars	2 Michelin stars
Hishinuma	Japanese	Tokyo – Minato	2 Michelin stars	2 Michelin stars	2 Michelin stars	1 Michelin star	1 Michelin star	1 Michelin star	1 Michelin star	—	—	—
Hommage	French	Tokyo – Taito	—	1 Michelin star	1 Michelin star	1 Michelin star	1 Michelin star	1 Michelin star	1 Michelin star	2 Michelin stars	2 Michelin stars	2 Michelin stars
Horikane	Japanese	Tokyo – Minato	2 Michelin stars	2 Michelin stars	2 Michelin stars	—	—	—	—	—	—	—
Ichimonji	Japanese	Tokyo – Shinjuku	2 Michelin stars	2 Michelin stars	1 Michelin star	1 Michelin star	1 Michelin star	1 Michelin star	1 Michelin star	1 Michelin star	1 Michelin star	—
Ichirin	Japanese	Tokyo – Shibuya	1 Michelin star	2 Michelin stars	2 Michelin stars	1 Michelin star	1 Michelin star	1 Michelin star	1 Michelin star	1 Michelin star	1 Michelin star	—
Inua (Note: Restaurant closed in 2020)	Innovative	Tokyo – Chiyoda	—	—	—	—	—	—	—	—	—	2 Michelin stars
Ishikawa	Japanese	Tokyo – Shinjuku	3 Michelin stars	3 Michelin stars	3 Michelin stars	3 Michelin stars	3 Michelin stars	3 Michelin stars	3 Michelin stars	3 Michelin stars	3 Michelin stars	3 Michelin stars
Joël Robuchon Tokyo	French	Tokyo – Meguro	3 Michelin stars	3 Michelin stars	3 Michelin stars	3 Michelin stars	3 Michelin stars	3 Michelin stars	3 Michelin stars	3 Michelin stars	3 Michelin stars	3 Michelin stars
Jingumae Higuchi	Japanese	Tokyo – Shibuya	1 Michelin star	1 Michelin star	1 Michelin star	1 Michelin star	1 Michelin star	1 Michelin star	1 Michelin star	2 Michelin stars	2 Michelin stars	2 Michelin stars
Jushu	Japanese	Tokyo – Minato	—	1 Michelin star	2 Michelin stars	2 Michelin stars	2 Michelin stars	2 Michelin stars	2 Michelin stars	2 Michelin stars	2 Michelin stars	2 Michelin stars
Kadowaki	Japanese	Tokyo – Minato	2 Michelin stars	2 Michelin stars	2 Michelin stars	2 Michelin stars	2 Michelin stars	2 Michelin stars	2 Michelin stars	2 Michelin stars	2 Michelin stars	3 Michelin stars
Kaiseki Komuro	Japanese	Tokyo – Shinjuku	2 Michelin stars	2 Michelin stars	2 Michelin stars	2 Michelin stars	2 Michelin stars	2 Michelin stars	2 Michelin stars	2 Michelin stars	2 Michelin stars	2 Michelin stars
Kaiseki Tsujitome	Japanese	Tokyo – Minato	2 Michelin stars	2 Michelin stars	2 Michelin stars	2 Michelin stars	2 Michelin stars	2 Michelin stars	2 Michelin stars	2 Michelin stars	2 Michelin stars	2 Michelin stars
Kanda	Japanese	Tokyo – Minato	3 Michelin stars	3 Michelin stars	3 Michelin stars	3 Michelin stars	3 Michelin stars	3 Michelin stars	3 Michelin stars	3 Michelin stars	3 Michelin stars	3 Michelin stars
Kioicho Fukudaya	Japanese	Tokyo – Chiyoda	2 Michelin stars	2 Michelin stars	2 Michelin stars	2 Michelin stars	2 Michelin stars	2 Michelin stars	2 Michelin stars	2 Michelin stars	2 Michelin stars	2 Michelin stars
KM	French	Tokyo – Chūō	—	2 Michelin stars	2 Michelin stars	2 Michelin stars	2 Michelin stars	2 Michelin stars	2 Michelin stars	1 Michelin star	1 Michelin star	1 Michelin star
Kobikicho Tomoki	Japanese	Tokyo – Chūō	—	—	—	—	—	—	—	—	2 Michelin stars	2 Michelin stars
Kodama	Japanese	Tokyo – Minato	2 Michelin stars	2 Michelin stars	1 Michelin star	1 Michelin star	1 Michelin star	1 Michelin star	1 Michelin star	1 Michelin star	1 Michelin star	1 Michelin star
Kogetsu	Japanese	Tokyo – Shibuya	2 Michelin stars	2 Michelin stars	2 Michelin stars	2 Michelin stars	2 Michelin stars	2 Michelin stars	2 Michelin stars	1 Michelin star	1 Michelin star	—
Kohaku	Japanese	Tokyo – Shinjuku	—	2 Michelin stars	2 Michelin stars	2 Michelin stars	2 Michelin stars	3 Michelin stars	3 Michelin stars	3 Michelin stars	3 Michelin stars	3 Michelin stars
L'Atelier de Joël Robuchon	French	Tokyo – Minato	2 Michelin stars	2 Michelin stars	2 Michelin stars	2 Michelin stars	2 Michelin stars	2 Michelin stars	2 Michelin stars	2 Michelin stars	2 Michelin stars	2 Michelin stars
L'Effervescence	French	Tokyo – Minato	—	1 Michelin star	1 Michelin star	1 Michelin star	2 Michelin stars	2 Michelin stars	2 Michelin stars	2 Michelin stars	2 Michelin stars	2 Michelin stars
L'Osier	French	Tokyo – Chūō	Closed				2 Michelin stars	2 Michelin stars	2 Michelin stars	2 Michelin stars	3 Michelin stars	3 Michelin stars
La Table de Joël Robuchon	French	Tokyo – Meguro	2 Michelin stars	2 Michelin stars	2 Michelin stars	2 Michelin stars	2 Michelin stars	2 Michelin stars	2 Michelin stars	2 Michelin stars	2 Michelin stars	2 Michelin stars
Le Mange-Tout	French	Tokyo – Meguro	2 Michelin stars	2 Michelin stars	2 Michelin stars	2 Michelin stars	2 Michelin stars	2 Michelin stars	2 Michelin stars	2 Michelin stars	2 Michelin stars	2 Michelin stars
Makimura	Japanese	Tokyo – Shinagawa	2 Michelin stars	2 Michelin stars	2 Michelin stars	2 Michelin stars	3 Michelin stars	3 Michelin stars	3 Michelin stars	3 Michelin stars	3 Michelin stars	3 Michelin stars
Mitamachi Momonoki	Chinese	Tokyo – Minato	1 Michelin star	1 Michelin star	1 Michelin star	1 Michelin star	1 Michelin star	2 Michelin stars	2 Michelin stars	2 Michelin stars	2 Michelin stars	2 Michelin stars
Moranbong	Korean	Tokyo – Arakawa	—	2 Michelin stars	2 Michelin stars	2 Michelin stars	—	—	—	—	—	—
Nadaman Sazanka So (Note: Restaurant lost its stars in 2015 following restricting its booking access for the general public)	Japanese	Tokyo – Chiyoda	2 Michelin stars	2 Michelin stars	2 Michelin stars	2 Michelin stars	—	—	—	—	—	—
Nabeno-Ism	French	Tokyo – Taito	—	—	—	—	—	—	—	—	2 Michelin stars	2 Michelin stars
Narisawa	Innovative	Tokyo – Minato	2 Michelin stars	2 Michelin stars	2 Michelin stars	2 Michelin stars	2 Michelin stars	2 Michelin stars	2 Michelin stars	2 Michelin stars	2 Michelin stars	2 Michelin stars
Nishiazabu Kikuchi	Japanese	Tokyo – Minato	2 Michelin stars	2 Michelin stars	2 Michelin stars	2 Michelin stars	2 Michelin stars	2 Michelin stars	2 Michelin stars	2 Michelin stars	—	—
Nishiazabu Taku	Japanese	Tokyo – Minato	2 Michelin stars	2 Michelin stars	2 Michelin stars	2 Michelin stars	2 Michelin stars	2 Michelin stars	2 Michelin stars	2 Michelin stars	1 Michelin star	1 Michelin star
Okamoto	Japanese	Tokyo – Chūō	—	—	2 Michelin stars	2 Michelin stars	2 Michelin stars	2 Michelin stars	2 Michelin stars	2 Michelin stars	2 Michelin stars	2 Michelin stars
Oryori Miyasaka	Japanese	Tokyo – Minato	—	—	—	—	—	—	2 Michelin stars	2 Michelin stars	2 Michelin stars	2 Michelin stars
Pierre Gagnaire Tokyo	French	Tokyo – Minato	2 Michelin stars	2 Michelin stars	2 Michelin stars	2 Michelin stars	2 Michelin stars	2 Michelin stars	2 Michelin stars	2 Michelin stars	2 Michelin stars	2 Michelin stars
Prisma	Italian	Tokyo – Minato	—	—	—	—	—	—	—	1 Michelin star	1 Michelin star	2 Michelin stars
Quintessence	French	Tokyo – Shinagawa	3 Michelin stars	3 Michelin stars	3 Michelin stars	3 Michelin stars	3 Michelin stars	3 Michelin stars	3 Michelin stars	3 Michelin stars	3 Michelin stars	3 Michelin stars
Rakutei	Japanese	Tokyo – Minato	2 Michelin stars	2 Michelin stars	2 Michelin stars	2 Michelin stars	2 Michelin stars	Closed				
Reikasai	Chinese	Tokyo – Minato	2 Michelin stars	1 Michelin star	Closed							
Ren	Japanese	Tokyo – Shinjuku	2 Michelin stars	2 Michelin stars	2 Michelin stars	2 Michelin stars	2 Michelin stars	2 Michelin stars	2 Michelin stars	2 Michelin stars	2 Michelin stars	1 Michelin star
Ristorante Aso	Italian	Tokyo – Shibuya	2 Michelin stars	1 Michelin star	1 Michelin star	1 Michelin star	1 Michelin star	Closed				
Ryugin	Japanese	Tokyo – Minato	2 Michelin stars	3 Michelin stars	3 Michelin stars	3 Michelin stars	3 Michelin stars	3 Michelin stars	3 Michelin stars	3 Michelin stars	3 Michelin stars	3 Michelin stars
Ryuzu	French	Tokyo – Minato	—	1 Michelin star	2 Michelin stars	2 Michelin stars	2 Michelin stars	2 Michelin stars	2 Michelin stars	2 Michelin stars	2 Michelin stars	2 Michelin stars
Sant Pau Tokyo	Spanish	Tokyo – Chūō	2 Michelin stars	1 Michelin star	1 Michelin star	2 Michelin stars	2 Michelin stars	2 Michelin stars	2 Michelin stars	2 Michelin stars	2 Michelin stars	2 Michelin stars
Sawada	Japanese	Tokyo – Chūō	2 Michelin stars	2 Michelin stars	2 Michelin stars	2 Michelin stars	2 Michelin stars	2 Michelin stars	2 Michelin stars	2 Michelin stars	2 Michelin stars	2 Michelin stars
Sazenka	Chinese	Tokyo – Minato	—	—	—	—	—	—	—	2 Michelin stars	2 Michelin stars	3 Michelin stars
Seisoka	Japanese	Tokyo – Minato	2 Michelin stars	2 Michelin stars	2 Michelin stars	2 Michelin stars	2 Michelin stars	2 Michelin stars	2 Michelin stars	2 Michelin stars	2 Michelin stars	2 Michelin stars
Seizan	Japanese	Tokyo – Minato	—	—	2 Michelin stars	2 Michelin stars	2 Michelin stars	2 Michelin stars	2 Michelin stars	2 Michelin stars	2 Michelin stars	2 Michelin stars
Sekihotei	Japanese	Tokyo – Shibuya	2 Michelin stars	2 Michelin stars	2 Michelin stars	2 Michelin stars	2 Michelin stars	2 Michelin stars	2 Michelin stars	2 Michelin stars	2 Michelin stars	1 Michelin star
Shigeyoshi	Japanese	Tokyo – Shibuya	2 Michelin stars	2 Michelin stars	2 Michelin stars	2 Michelin stars	2 Michelin stars	2 Michelin stars	2 Michelin stars	2 Michelin stars	1 Michelin star	1 Michelin star
Shinbashi Sasada	Japanese	Tokyo – Minato	2 Michelin stars	—	2 Michelin stars	2 Michelin stars	1 Michelin star	1 Michelin star	1 Michelin star	1 Michelin star	1 Michelin star	1 Michelin star
Sukiyabashi Jiro (Note: Restaurant lost its stars in 2020 following restricting its booking access for the general public)	Japanese	Tokyo – Chūō	3 Michelin stars	3 Michelin stars	3 Michelin stars	3 Michelin stars	3 Michelin stars	3 Michelin stars	3 Michelin stars	3 Michelin stars	3 Michelin stars	—
Sukiyabashi Jiro Roppongiten	Japanese	Tokyo – Minato	2 Michelin stars	2 Michelin stars	2 Michelin stars	2 Michelin stars	2 Michelin stars	2 Michelin stars	2 Michelin stars	2 Michelin stars	2 Michelin stars	2 Michelin stars
Sushi Kanesaka	Japanese	Tokyo – Chūō	2 Michelin stars	2 Michelin stars	1 Michelin star	1 Michelin star	1 Michelin star	1 Michelin star	1 Michelin star	1 Michelin star	1 Michelin star	1 Michelin star
Sushi Kazui	Japanese	Tokyo – Chūō	2 Michelin stars	Closed								
Sushi Kimura	Japanese	Tokyo – Setagaya	—	—	2 Michelin stars	2 Michelin stars	2 Michelin stars	2 Michelin stars	2 Michelin stars	2 Michelin stars	2 Michelin stars	2 Michelin stars
Sushi Masuda	Japanese	Tokyo – Minato	—	—	—	—	1 Michelin star	1 Michelin star	2 Michelin stars	2 Michelin stars	2 Michelin stars	—
Sushi Mizutani	Japanese	Tokyo – Chūō	3 Michelin stars	3 Michelin stars	3 Michelin stars	3 Michelin stars	2 Michelin stars	2 Michelin stars	Closed			
Sushi Saito	Japanese	Tokyo – Minato	3 Michelin stars	3 Michelin stars	3 Michelin stars	3 Michelin stars	3 Michelin stars	3 Michelin stars	3 Michelin stars	3 Michelin stars	3 Michelin stars	—
Sushi Yoshitake	Japanese	Tokyo – Chūō	—	3 Michelin stars	3 Michelin stars	3 Michelin stars	3 Michelin stars	3 Michelin stars	3 Michelin stars	3 Michelin stars	3 Michelin stars	3 Michelin stars
Tateru Yoshino Shiba	French	Tokyo – Minato	2 Michelin stars	2 Michelin stars	2 Michelin stars	2 Michelin stars	1 Michelin star	1 Michelin star	1 Michelin star	1 Michelin star	1 Michelin star	1 Michelin star
Tempura Ginya	Japanese	Tokyo – Minato	—	—	—	—	1 Michelin star	1 Michelin star	2 Michelin stars	2 Michelin stars	2 Michelin stars	2 Michelin stars
Tempura Kondo	Japanese	Tokyo – Chūō	2 Michelin stars	2 Michelin stars	2 Michelin stars	2 Michelin stars	2 Michelin stars	2 Michelin stars	2 Michelin stars	2 Michelin stars	2 Michelin stars	2 Michelin stars
Tentempura Uchitsu	Japanese	Tokyo – Shibuya	1 Michelin star	1 Michelin star	1 Michelin star	2 Michelin stars	2 Michelin stars	2 Michelin stars	2 Michelin stars	2 Michelin stars	2 Michelin stars	2 Michelin stars
Tomura	Japanese	Tokyo – Minato	2 Michelin stars	2 Michelin stars	—	—	—	—	—	—	—	
Tsukiji Yamamoto	Seafood	Tokyo – Chūō	2 Michelin stars	2 Michelin stars	2 Michelin stars	2 Michelin stars	—	—	—	—	—	—
Umi	Japanese	Tokyo – Minato	2 Michelin stars	2 Michelin stars	2 Michelin stars	2 Michelin stars	2 Michelin stars	2 Michelin stars	2 Michelin stars	2 Michelin stars	2 Michelin stars	—
Usukifugu Yamadaya	Seafood	Tokyo – Minato	3 Michelin stars	3 Michelin stars	3 Michelin stars	3 Michelin stars	3 Michelin stars	3 Michelin stars	3 Michelin stars	3 Michelin stars	3 Michelin stars	2 Michelin stars
Waketokuyama	Japanese	Tokyo – Minato	2 Michelin stars	2 Michelin stars	2 Michelin stars	2 Michelin stars	2 Michelin stars	2 Michelin stars	2 Michelin stars	1 Michelin star	1 Michelin star	1 Michelin star
Wako	Japanese	Tokyo – Toshima	2 Michelin stars	Closed								
Xiao Xiong Fan Dian	Chinese	Tokyo – Shibuya	—	—	2 Michelin stars	2 Michelin stars	2 Michelin stars	Closed				
Yunke	Korean	Tokyo – Chūō	—	—	—	2 Michelin stars	2 Michelin stars	2 Michelin stars	2 Michelin stars	2 Michelin stars	2 Michelin stars	2 Michelin stars
Zurriola	Spanish	Tokyo – Chūō	—	1 Michelin star	1 Michelin star	1 Michelin star	2 Michelin stars	2 Michelin stars	2 Michelin stars	2 Michelin stars	2 Michelin stars	2 Michelin stars
Reference(s)												

=== 2008–2010 ===
Michelin-starred restaurants
Name	Cuisine	Location	2008	2009	2010
Aimee Vibert	French	Tokyo – Chūō	2 Michelin stars	2 Michelin stars	2 Michelin stars
Ajiman	Seafood	Tokyo – Minato	1 Michelin star	1 Michelin star	2 Michelin stars
Akasaka Kikunoi	Japanese	Tokyo – Minato	2 Michelin stars	2 Michelin stars	2 Michelin stars
Argento Aso	Italian	Tokyo – Chūō	1 Michelin star	2 Michelin stars	2 Michelin stars
Azabu Yukimura	Japanese	Tokyo – Minato	1 Michelin star	2 Michelin stars	3 Michelin stars
Crescent	French	Tokyo – Minato	1 Michelin star	2 Michelin stars	2 Michelin stars
Cuisine[s] Michel Troisgros	French	Tokyo – Shinjuku	2 Michelin stars	2 Michelin stars	2 Michelin stars
Daigo	Japanese	Tokyo – Minato	2 Michelin stars	2 Michelin stars	2 Michelin stars
Édition Koji Shimomura	French	Tokyo – Minato	—	2 Michelin stars	2 Michelin stars
Esaki	Japanese	Tokyo – Shibuya	2 Michelin stars	2 Michelin stars	3 Michelin stars
Fugu Fukuji	Seafood	Tokyo – Chūō	—	1 Michelin star	2 Michelin stars
Ginza Koju	Japanese	Tokyo – Chūō	3 Michelin stars	3 Michelin stars	3 Michelin stars
Hamadaya	Japanese	Tokyo – Chūō	3 Michelin stars	3 Michelin stars	2 Michelin stars
Hatsunezushi	Japanese	Tokyo – Ota	—	2 Michelin stars	2 Michelin stars
Hishinuma	Japanese	Tokyo – Minato	2 Michelin stars	2 Michelin stars	2 Michelin stars
Horikane	Japanese	Tokyo – Minato	—	2 Michelin stars	2 Michelin stars
Ichimonji	Japanese	Tokyo – Shinjuku	2 Michelin stars	2 Michelin stars	2 Michelin stars
Ishikawa	Japanese	Tokyo – Shinjuku	2 Michelin stars	3 Michelin stars	3 Michelin stars
Joël Robuchon Tokyo	French	Tokyo – Meguro	3 Michelin stars	3 Michelin stars	3 Michelin stars
Kadowaki	Japanese	Tokyo – Minato	—	2 Michelin stars	2 Michelin stars
Kaiseki Komuro	Japanese	Tokyo – Shinjuku	1 Michelin star	1 Michelin star	2 Michelin stars
Kaiseki Tsujitome	Japanese	Tokyo – Minato	—	1 Michelin star	2 Michelin stars
Kanda	Japanese	Tokyo – Minato	3 Michelin stars	3 Michelin stars	3 Michelin stars
Kioicho Fukudaya	Japanese	Tokyo – Chiyoda	2 Michelin stars	2 Michelin stars	2 Michelin stars
Kodama	Japanese	Tokyo – Minato	—	2 Michelin stars	2 Michelin stars
Kogetsu	Japanese	Tokyo – Shibuya	2 Michelin stars	2 Michelin stars	2 Michelin stars
L'Atelier de Joël Robuchon	French	Tokyo – Minato	2 Michelin stars	2 Michelin stars	2 Michelin stars
L'Osier	French	Tokyo – Chūō	3 Michelin stars	3 Michelin stars	3 Michelin stars
La Table de Joël Robuchon	French	Tokyo – Meguro	1 Michelin star	2 Michelin stars	2 Michelin stars
Le Mange-Tout	French	Tokyo – Meguro	2 Michelin stars	2 Michelin stars	2 Michelin stars
Nanachome Kyoboshi	Japanese	Tokyo – Chūō	—	2 Michelin stars	2 Michelin stars
Narisawa	Innovative	Tokyo – Minato	—	1 Michelin star	2 Michelin stars
Pierre Gagnaire Tokyo	French	Tokyo – Minato	2 Michelin stars	2 Michelin stars	—
Quintessence	French	Tokyo – Shinagawa	3 Michelin stars	3 Michelin stars	3 Michelin stars
Rakutei	Japanese	Tokyo – Minato	—	1 Michelin star	2 Michelin stars
Reikasai	Chinese	Tokyo – Minato	2 Michelin stars	2 Michelin stars	2 Michelin stars
Ristorante Aso	Italian	Tokyo – Shibuya	2 Michelin stars	2 Michelin stars	2 Michelin stars
Ryugin	Japanese	Tokyo – Minato	2 Michelin stars	2 Michelin stars	2 Michelin stars
Nishiazabu Taku	Japanese	Tokyo – Minato	2 Michelin stars	2 Michelin stars	2 Michelin stars
Sant Pau Tokyo	Spanish	Tokyo – Chūō	2 Michelin stars	2 Michelin stars	2 Michelin stars
Sawada	Japanese	Tokyo – Chūō	2 Michelin stars	2 Michelin stars	2 Michelin stars
Seisoka	Japanese	Tokyo – Minato	—	—	2 Michelin stars
Sekihotei	Japanese	Tokyo – Shibuya	1 Michelin star	1 Michelin star	2 Michelin stars
Shigeyoshi	Japanese	Tokyo – Shibuya	1 Michelin star	1 Michelin star	2 Michelin stars
Sukiyabashi Jiro	Japanese	Tokyo – Chūō	3 Michelin stars	3 Michelin stars	3 Michelin stars
Sushi Kanesaka	Japanese	Tokyo – Chūō	2 Michelin stars	2 Michelin stars	2 Michelin stars
Sushi Mizutani	Japanese	Tokyo – Chūō	3 Michelin stars	3 Michelin stars	3 Michelin stars
Sushi Saito	Japanese	Tokyo – Minato	1 Michelin star	2 Michelin stars	3 Michelin stars
Tempura Kondo	Japanese	Tokyo – Chūō	1 Michelin star	2 Michelin stars	2 Michelin stars
Tomura	Japanese	Tokyo – Minato	1 Michelin star	2 Michelin stars	2 Michelin stars
Tsukiji Uemura	Seafood	Tokyo – Chūō	2 Michelin stars	1 Michelin star	1 Michelin star
Tsukiji Yamamoto	Seafood	Tokyo – Chūō	2 Michelin stars	2 Michelin stars	2 Michelin stars
Twenty One	Seafood	Tokyo – Shinjuku	2 Michelin stars	Closed	
Umi	Japanese	Tokyo – Minato	1 Michelin star	2 Michelin stars	2 Michelin stars
Usukifugu Yamadaya	Seafood	Tokyo – Minato	2 Michelin stars	2 Michelin stars	2 Michelin stars
Wako	Japanese	Tokyo – Toshima	2 Michelin stars	2 Michelin stars	2 Michelin stars
Reference(s)					

== See also ==
- List of Michelin-starred restaurants in Japan
- List of Michelin-starred restaurants in Hokkaido
- List of Michelin-starred restaurants in Kyoto and Osaka
- List of Michelin-starred restaurants in Nara
- List of restaurants in Tokyo

== Bibliography ==
- Michelin Guide Tokyo Yokohama Shonan 2012. Michelin Travel & Lifestyle. 2012. ISBN 978-2-06-716982-1.
- Michelin Guide Tokyo Yokohama Shonan 2013. Michelin Travel & Lifestyle. 2013. ISBN 978-4-904337-02-8.
- Michelin Guide Tokyo 2024. Michelin Travel & Lifestyle. 2024. ISBN 978-4-904337-13-4.
- Michelin Guide Tokyo 2025. Michelin Travel & Lifestyle. 2025. ISBN 978-4-904337-39-4.
