= List of restaurants in Tokyo =

This is a list of notable restaurants in Tokyo, Japan.

== Restaurants in Tokyo ==
- Afuri – chain of ramen restaurants
- Anna Miller's – Pennsylvania Dutch-themed restaurant in Minami-Aoyama, Tokyo
- L'Atelier de Joël Robuchon – Michelin 2-star French restaurant located in Minato, Tokyo
- Butlers Café – restaurant and bar located in Shibuya, Tokyo, one of Japan's leading fashion centers
- Les Créations de Narisawa – received one Michelin star in the 2008 Michelin Guide Tokyo, and then two stars in 2010
- Grand Central Oyster Bar & Restaurant – has two locations in Tokyo
- Matsukawa -an invitation-only kaiseki restaurant in Akasaka, Tokyo
- Matsugen – name of several Japanese restaurants owned by the Matsushita brothers located in Tokyo, Hawaii, and New York City
- Nihonryori Ryugin – fusion cuisine restaurant in Minato-ku, Tokyo
- L'Osier – Michelin Guide former 3-star (2008–2011) classic French cuisine restaurant in Chuo-ku, Tokyo
- Little Texas – Texan cuisine honky-tonk, one of the main venues for country and Western music in Japan.
- Ramen Street – area in the underground mall of the Tokyo Station railway station's Yaesu side that has eight restaurants specializing in ramen dishes.
- Ribera Steakhouse – Japanese professional wrestling, boxing and mixed martial arts-themed steak house restaurant with two locations in Tokyo
- Sushi Ginza Onodera
- Tokyo Skytree – Sky Restaurant 634 is located here

== Michelin 3-starred restaurants ==
The Michelin Guide for Tokyo was started in 2008.

=== Tokyo [Kantō region 関東地方] ===
Name	City	2008 (150)	2009 (227)	2010 (261)	2011 (266)	2012 (293)	2013 (373)	2014 (281)	2015 (226)	2016 (217)	2017 (227)	2018 (234)	2019 (230)	2020 (226)
Araki	Ginza, Chūō, Tokyo				3 stars	3 stars	Closed in 2013, relocated to London in 2014							
Azabu Yukimura	Azabu-Jūban, Minato				3 stars	3 stars	3 stars	3 stars	3 stars	3 stars	3 stars	3 stars	3 stars	3 stars
Esaki	Shibuya				3 stars	3 stars	3 stars	3 stars	3 stars	3 stars	Lost in 2017 and relocated/rebranded in Sep 2018 as Yatsugatake Esaki			
Ginza Koju	Ginza, Chūō, Tokyo	3 stars	3 stars	3 stars	3 stars	3 stars	3 stars	3 stars	2 stars	2 stars	2 stars	2 stars	2 stars	2 stars
Hamadaya	Chūō, Tokyo	3 stars	3 stars	3 stars	3 stars	3 stars	2 stars	2 stars	2 stars	2 stars	2 stars	2 stars	-	-
Ishikawa	Shinjuku				3 stars	3 stars	3 stars	3 stars	3 stars	3 stars	3 stars	3 stars	3 stars	3 stars
Joël Robuchon	Meguro	3 stars	3 stars	3 stars	3 stars	3 stars	3 stars	3 stars	3 stars	3 stars	3 stars	3 stars	3 stars	3 stars
Kanda	Minato	3 stars	3 stars	3 stars	3 stars	3 stars	3 stars	3 stars	3 stars	3 stars	3 stars	3 stars	3 stars	3 stars
Kohaku	Shinjuku					2 stars	2 stars	2 stars	2 stars	3 stars	3 stars	3 stars	3 stars	3 stars
7chome Kyoboshi	Ginza, Chūō, Tokyo				3 stars	3 stars	3 stars	2 stars	-	-	-	-	-	-
Makimura	Shinagawa				2 stars	2 stars	2 stars	2 stars	3 stars	3 stars	3 stars	3 stars	3 stars	3 stars
Quintessence	Shinagawa	3 stars	3 stars	3 stars	3 stars	3 stars	3 stars	3 stars	3 stars	3 stars	3 stars	3 stars	3 stars	3 stars
Ryugin	Roppongi, Minato				2 stars	3 stars	3 stars	3 stars	3 stars	3 stars	3 stars	3 stars	3 stars	3 stars
Sazenka	Minato-ku											2 stars	2 stars	3 stars
Sukiyabashi Jiro	Ginza, Chūō, Tokyo	3 stars	3 stars	3 stars	3 stars	3 stars	3 stars	3 stars	3 stars	3 stars	3 stars	3 stars	3 stars	-
Sushi Mizutani	Ginza, Chūō, Tokyo	3 stars	3 stars	3 stars	3 stars	3 stars	3 stars	3 stars	2 stars	2 stars	Closed in 2016			
Sushi Saito	Minato				3 stars	3 stars	3 stars	3 stars	3 stars	3 stars	3 stars	3 stars	3 stars	-
Sushi Yoshitake	Ginza, Chūō, Tokyo	-				3 stars	3 stars	3 stars	3 stars	3 stars	3 stars	3 stars	3 stars	3 stars
Usukifugu Yamadaya	Minato				3 stars	3 stars	3 stars	3 stars	3 stars	3 stars	3 stars	3 stars	2 stars	2 stars
L'Osier	Chūō, Tokyo	3 stars	3 stars	3 stars	Closed for reconstruction; New chef				2 stars	2 stars	2 stars	2 stars	3 stars	3 stars
Kadowaki	Minato		2 stars	2 stars	2 stars	2 stars	2 stars	2 stars	2 stars	2 stars	2 stars	2 stars	2 stars	3 stars

== See also ==
- List of Michelin-starred restaurants in Japan
- List of Michelin-starred restaurants in Tokyo
- Lists of restaurants
