= Kadowaki =

Corn dough used in Latin American dishes

Kadowaki (written: 門脇) is a Japanese surname. Notable people with the surname include:

- Hideki Kadowaki (門脇 英基; born 1976), Japanese mixed martial artist
- Mai Kadowaki (門脇 舞以; born 1980), Japanese voice actress
- Mugi Kadowaki (門脇 麦; born 1992), Japanese television and film actress
- Yoshimitsu Kadowaki (門脇 慶充; born 1953), Japanese bobsledder

== See also ==
- Kadowaki–Woods ratio, named for physicists Kazuo Kadowaki (門脇 和男) and S.B. Woods
- Kadowaki (restaurant), a 3 star Michelin restaurant in Tokyo, Japan
