= Losier =

Losier is a French surname. Notable people with the surname include:

- Denis Losier (born 1952), Canadian businessman, economist and politician
- Marie Losier (born 1972), French film director

== See also ==
- Losier Settlement, New Brunswick, settlement in New Brunswick, Canada
- L'Osier, French cuisine restaurant in Tokyo, Japan
