= Matsukawa (restaurant) =

Restaurant in Tokyo, Japan

Restaurant information
- Food type: Japanese Kaiseki
- Location: 1 Chome−11−6 Akasaka Terrace House, 1F, Tokyo, 107-0052, Japan
- Reservations: Required

Matsukawa (Japanese: 松川) is an invitation-only kaiseki restaurant in Akasaka, Tokyo. It has been listed among the World's 50 Best Restaurants.

== See also ==
- List of Michelin-starred restaurants in Tokyo
- List of restaurants in Tokyo
