= Sazenka =

Restaurant information
- Established: February 2017
- Owner: Ryoji Hayashi
- Head chef: Tomoya Kawada (executive chef)
- Food type: Chinese
- Dress code: casual (with some restrictions)
- Rating: (2020–present) (2017–2020)
- Location: 4-7-5 Minami-Azabu, Minato, Tokyo, 106-0047, Japan
- Website: sazenka.com

Sazenka (Japanese: 茶禅華, Hepburn: Sazenka) is a Michelin-starred Chinese restaurant in Minato, Tokyo.

== History ==
The restaurant opened in February 2017. Its executive chef, Tomoya Kawada (川田 智也), previously worked at a Chinese restaurant Abazu Choko (麻布長江) for ten years and a Japanese restaurant Nihonryori Ryugin for five years. Its owner is Ryoji Hayashi, who has been involved in another Tokyo-based Chinese restaurant Tousenkaku.

== Reception ==
Sazenka was awarded its first two stars in late 2017. It was then awarded the third star in late 2020, becoming the first Chinese restaurant in Tokyo to hold three Michelin stars. The Tabelog Award gave the restaurant a gold medal in 2018, 2019, and 2021.

GQ Japan magazine gave Sazenka the Best Breakthrough Award in late 2017. The restaurant was also ranked twenty-third in 2019, twenty-ninth in 2020, and twelfth in 2021 in Asia's 50 Best Restaurants list. It was also ranked seventy-fifth in 2021 in the World's 50 Best Restaurants list.

== See also ==
- List of Michelin-starred restaurants in Japan
