= Sushi Ginza Onodera =

Restaurant in California, U.S.

- Interactive map of Sushi Ginza Onodera

Restaurant information
- Head chef: Yohei Matsuki (Los Angeles); Takuya Kubo (New York); Kotaro Sato (Houston)
- Food type: Japanese
- Rating: New York (Michelin Guide); Los Angeles (Michelin Guide)
- Other information: $400 Seasonal Omakase tasting menu

Sushi Ginza Onodera is a restaurant chain specializing in sushi.

== Locations ==
Sushi Ginza Onodera operates in Houston and Honolulu, as well as Tokyo, and Shanghai.

=== Former locations ===
In 2014, Sushi Ginza Onodera opened a location in Paris, France. The restaurant has since closed.

In July 2023, it was announced the Michelin-starred, New York location, which first opened in 2016, would be closing August 19, 2023.

In June 2025, they announced the Michelin-starred Los Angeles location, which had been operating since December 2016, was closing.

== See also ==
- List of Japanese restaurants
- List of Michelin-starred restaurants in California
- List of Michelin-starred restaurants in New York City
- List of restaurants in Hawaii
- List of restaurants in Houston
- List of restaurants in Tokyo
