= Afuri =

Ramen restaurant chain based in Tokyo, Japan

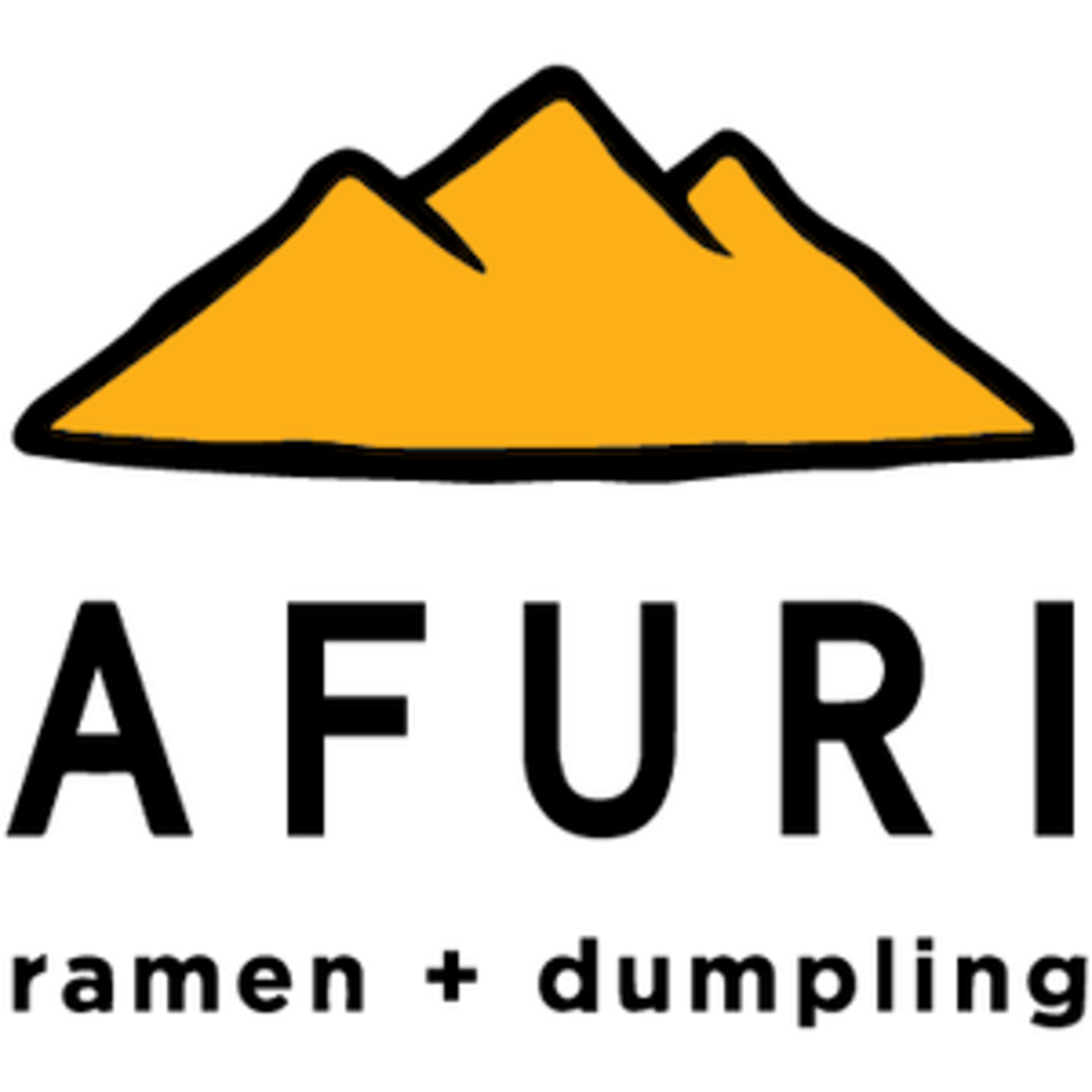

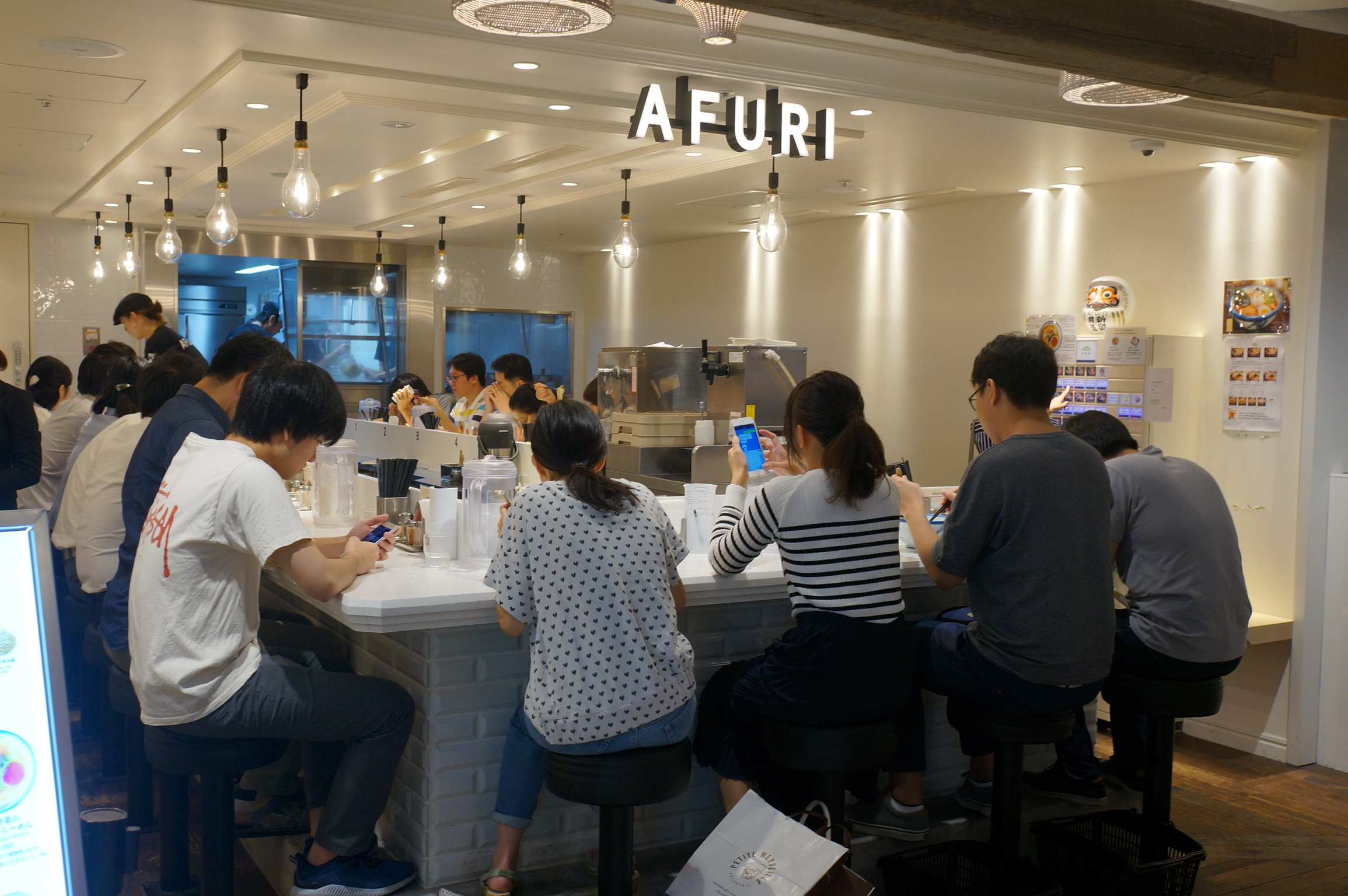
- Restaurant interior in Shinjuku, Tokyo, in 2017
- Interactive map of Afuri

Restaurant information
- Established: 2001
- Owner: Hiroto Nakamura
- Chef: Takeshi Kumazawa
- Food type: Japanese
- Dress code: Casual
- Location: 1954-7 Nanasawa, Atsugi, Kanagawa, 243-0121, Japan
- Coordinates: 35.451697°N 139.292425°E
- Website: afuri.com

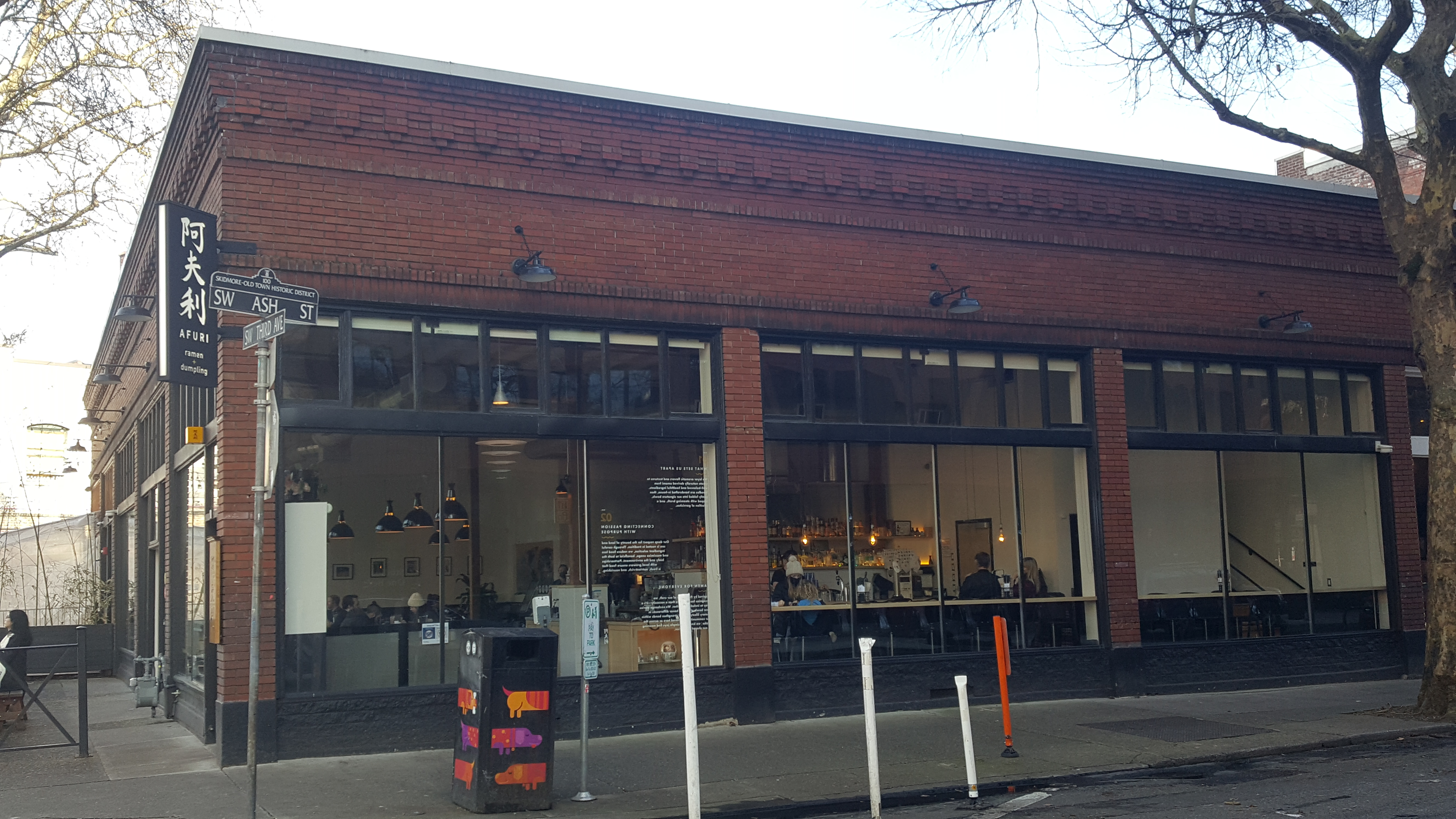
Exterior of Afuri in Southwest Portland, Oregon, in 2022

Afuri (also known as Afuri Izakaya) is a chain of ramen restaurants, based in Tokyo, Japan. There are locations in Oregon, California, Canada, Hong Kong, Portugal, and Singapore.

== History ==
The original noodle shop opened at the base of Mount Afuri in 2001. Founder Hiroto Nakamura partnered with Taichi Ishizuki to open a location in southeast Portland's Buckman neighborhood in 2016. Since then, three additional locations have opened in the Portland metropolitan area, in downtown and northwest Portland as well as Beaverton. Afuri USA operates Afuri Izakaya in southeast Portland, Afuri Ramen + Dumpling in Northwest Portland, and Afuri Ramen + Dumpling in Beaverton. Afuri USA is owned by Taichi Ishizuki. According to Portland Business Journal, the Portland locations are corporate-owned by Ishizuki, who has franchised outposts in Los Angeles, New York, Toronto, and Vancouver and co-owns two locations in Portugal. There are two locations in Hong Kong and one in Singapore.

In 2020, plans were announced to expand into northwest Portland. The restaurant opened in the Northwest District's Slabtown district in 2022. The location at 50 Southwest 3rd Avenue, called Afuri Kara Kurenai, closed permanently in January 2025.

== Reception ==
Afuri Izakaya won in the Best Ramen category of Willamette Week's annual 'Best of Portland' readers' poll in 2022, 2024, and 2025.

== See also ==
- List of Japanese restaurants
- List of restaurants in Tokyo
- List of restaurants in Vancouver
