= Kadowaki (restaurant) =

Azabu Kadowaki

Restaurant information
- Established: August 2000
- Owner: Toshima Kadowaki
- Head chef: Toshima Kadowaki
- Food type: Kaiseki
- Dress code: Business Casual
- Rating: (Michelin Guide) (2020-2025)
- Location: 2-7-2 Azabujuban, Minato-ku, Tokyo, 106-0045, Japan, Azabu-Jūban, Minato, Tokyo, 106-0045, Japan
- Seating capacity: 20 (6 at counter and 14 over several private tables)
- Reservations: Required
- Website: https://azabukadowaki.com/info.html#info_en

Azabu Kadowaki (Japanese: 麻布 かどわき), or Kadowaki for short, is a Michelin 3-star Kaiseki restaurant in Azabu-Jūban, Japan run by chef Toshima Kadowaki. The restaurant opened in August 2000 and initially refused Michelin stars, before gaining two stars in 2010 and subsequently gained 3 stars in 2020.

== Restaurant ==
The tasting menu consists of various different set courses with seasonal specialties. Example of seasonal ingredients include matsuba crab and matsutake mushrooms among many others. The signature dish of their restaurant, which is available as part of most of their course menus, is truffle claypot rice.

== Awards ==
Tabelog- Bronze Award since 2019, Tokyo Hyakumaiten (popularity/average ratings) in 2021, 2023, and 2025.

Michelin Guide- 3 stars from 2020–present, 2 stars from 2010-2019.

== See also ==
- List of Japanese restaurants
- List of Michelin 3-star restaurants
- List of Michelin-starred restaurants in Japan
