= Seiji Yamamoto =

Japanese chef (born 1970)

- Born: 1970 (age 55–56); Kagawa Prefecture, Japan
- Culinary career
- Cooking style: Japanese cuisine
- Rating
- Michelin stars
- Current restaurant
- Nihonryori RyuGin
- Previous restaurants
- Tenku RyuGin; Shoun RyuGin
- Awards
- American Express Icon Award for Asia's 50 Best Restaurants 2019

Seiji Yamamoto (山本征治, Yamamoto Seiji; born 1970) is a Japanese chef, who holds three Michelin stars at his restaurants, including Nihonryori RyuGin. His restaurant has been named in The World's 50 Best Restaurants, while he has placed fifth in Le Chef's list of the best chefs in the world.

== Culinary career ==
Yamamoto's food has been described as a combination of the Japanese Kaiseki with elements of molecular gastronomy, although he does not use those descriptors himself. His first experience of cooking was at 11 years old, when he made a dish of vegetables and rice at school. This impressed his mother, and he then would cook with her frequently. Yamamoto sometimes resented this as a child because it meant he did not have time to play, but felt it was worthwhile when he saw how happy his mother was when he made her dinner. Following culinary school, he spent the following 11 years working under Hirohisa Koyama at his restaurant Aoyagi.

He was invited to give a presentation at the Madrid Fusión international culinary show where he screen printed squid ink to resemble a newspaper. At another presentation, he prevented rigor mortis from setting into a fish using a wire. This has impressed several of his fellow chefs, with Ferran Adrià, formerly of elBulli, describing him as "one of the most important chefs in Japan."

At his restaurants, he takes on staff from a variety of cultural backgrounds to allow the things they learn there to be spread to other countries - with this he hopes that Japanese cuisine can continue to evolve. Yamamoto feels that unlike Chinese cuisine, the elements of Japanese food are not well described in other cultures it should be combined with the places it travels to. He compared replicating Japanese food exactly in Hong Kong to producing counterfeit money.

His signature dish is a soup made from hamo eel. Rather than adopt the traditional knife techniques of his fellow Japanese chefs to remove the bones from the fish, he instead had one undergo a CT scan to exactly map out the bone structure to allow him to carve it with ease. This dish is routinely on the tasting menus at his restaurants. This was originally prepared for a cooking demonstration in 2005.

=== Nihonryori RyuGin ===
He opened his Tokyo-based restaurant, Nihonryori RyuGin, in 2003. It is popular among western travellers, and is routinely visited by chefs of Michelin star restaurants. In 2016, it placed 31st in Restaurant magazine's list of The World's 50 Best Restaurants. It has been named fifth in Asia's Best Restaurants, and holds three stars in the Michelin Guide. He has since expanded his restaurant empire, opening Tenku RyuGin on the 101st floor of International Commerce Centre in Hong Kong from 2012 to 2020, and Shoun RyuGin in Taipei from 2014 to 2022. He aimed to visit the oversea branches four times a year with additional conversations held over Skype. Both overseas branches were awarded two Michelin stars throughout the years.

== Awards ==
He was personally described by Time Out Tokyo as one of 50 reasons why Tokyo was the greatest city in the world. In 2016, French magazine Le Chef named Yamamoto the fifth best chef in the world, the highest placed non-European in the list. In June 2022, he was recognized by the International Hospitality Institute on the Global 100 as one of the 100 Most Powerful People in Global Hospitality.
