= Bruno Menard =

3-Michelin-star French chef

- Born: 1962 (age 62–63); Tours, France
- Culinary career
- Cooking style: Fusion cuisine
- Rating(s): Michelin Stars Mobil Travel Guide AAA Guide
- Current restaurant(s): Junon Restaurant
- Previous restaurant(s): L'Osier The Dining Room at Ritz-Carlton Atlanta Tatou Tokyo Le Golden
- Website: menardbruno.com

Bruno Menard is a French chef. Early in his career, he became executive chef at the restaurant Tatou Tokyo, from which he was invited to compete on Iron Chef. He began to experiment with combining French and Japanese cuisine when he took over as chef at the Ritz-Carlton in Osaka. He then took over "The Dining Room" restaurant at the Ritz-Carlton in Atlanta, where he was awarded five stars by Mobil Travel Guide and five diamonds by AAA guide.

In the early 2000s, he moved back to Tokyo to take over as head chef at L'Osier, earning 3 Michelin stars. After L'Osier temporarily closed in 2011 for repair, he left the restaurant to start a consulting firm and has judged on MasterChef Asia. He has also been president of Bocuse d'Or Singapore and helped found the Bocuse d'Or Singapore Academy. The town of Saint-Cyr-sur-Loire, France named a street after him — Rue Bruno Menard.

== Early life and career ==
Menard was born in 1962 in Tours, France, into a family of professional chefs. His father was a pastry chef specialising in chocolate, his grandfather was a patissier and cook, and his other grandfather was a charcutier. Partly inspired by his family, he began cooking at age six, and at age eight, his father invited him to work in a one-star Michelin restaurant near his hometown of Tours. According to Menard, the first dish he learned to cook was croquette Pojarski. In his 20s, he began working under 3-Michelin star chef Charles Barrier and then Jean Bardet. At age 27–28, he became the youngest French Chef to obtain 17/20 and 3 toques in Gault Millau guide, as Executive Chef at the restaurant “Le Golden” in Niort.

== Television ==
- Iron Chef (1995)
- MasterChef Asia (2015)
