= Sushi Saito =

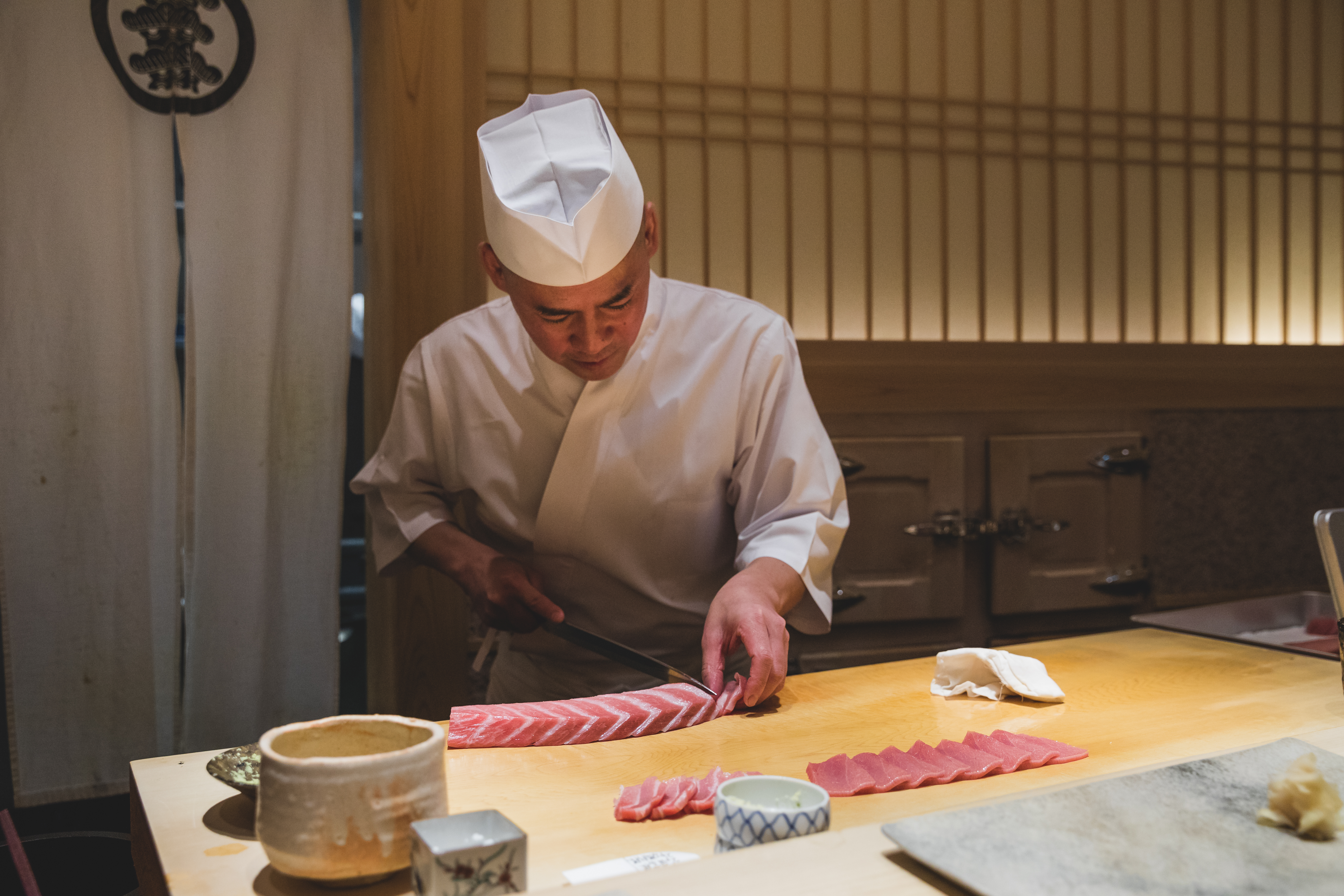
- Sushi Saito in December 2017
- Interactive map of Sushi Saito

Restaurant information
- Chef: Takashi Saito
- Food type: Japanese cuisine
- Location: 1st floor Ark Hills South Tower, 1-4-5 Roppongi, Minato-ku, Tokyo, Japan
- Seating capacity: 8
- Reservations: Essential

Sushi Saito (鮨さいとう, Sushi Saitō) is a Japanese cuisine restaurant in Minato, Tokyo, primarily known for serving sushi. It had three Michelin stars until it chose to stop accepting reservations from the general public.

== Description ==
Sushi Saito, owned by chef Takashi Saito, who trained at Ginza Kyubey, is located at First Floor Ark Hills south Tower, 1-4-5 Roppongi, Minato-ku, Tokyo. It moved to its current location in February 2014. The restaurant seats eight people. Because of the limited seating and popularity of the restaurant, reservations have been described as essential. In reality, it is impossible to get a reservation at Sushi Saito unless you are a regular patron.

The prestigious publication LaListe.com ranked, in its 2024 edition, Sushi Saito as best restaurant in the world with 99.50 points, tied with other restaurants for the spot.

== Reception ==
Kelly Wetherille for CNN Travel, described Sushi Saito as a "hidden gem". She said that "tender, flavorful seafood and perfectly seasoned rice are worth every penny". Fodor's travel guide described the food there as being "the freshest sushi available in the world". Chef Joël Robuchon, who held the most Michelin stars in the world of any chef, once described Sushi Saito as "the best sushi restaurant in the world".

The restaurant gained a third Michelin star on the 2009 list, having previously held two. Takashi Saito said he was "very happy" at the news. Former Michelin Guide directeur général Jean-Luc Naret said that he "wanted to make this place my own". In the Asia-only version of The World's 50 Best Restaurants by Restaurant magazine, Sushi Saito was ranked 39th in 2013. The restaurant was removed from the Michelin Guide in 2019 because it is no longer open to the public.

== See also ==
- List of restaurants in Tokyo
- List of sushi restaurants
