= Ishikawa (restaurant) =

Coordinates: 35°42′05″N 139°44′21″E

- Interactive map of Ishikawa

Restaurant information
- Owner: Hideki Ishikawa
- Head chef: Hideki Ishikawa
- Food type: Kaiseki
- Rating: (Michelin Guide)
- Location: 神楽坂5−37 高村ビル1F, Shinjuku, Tokyo, 162-0825, Japan
- Reservations: Required
- Website: kagurazaka-ishikawa.co.jp

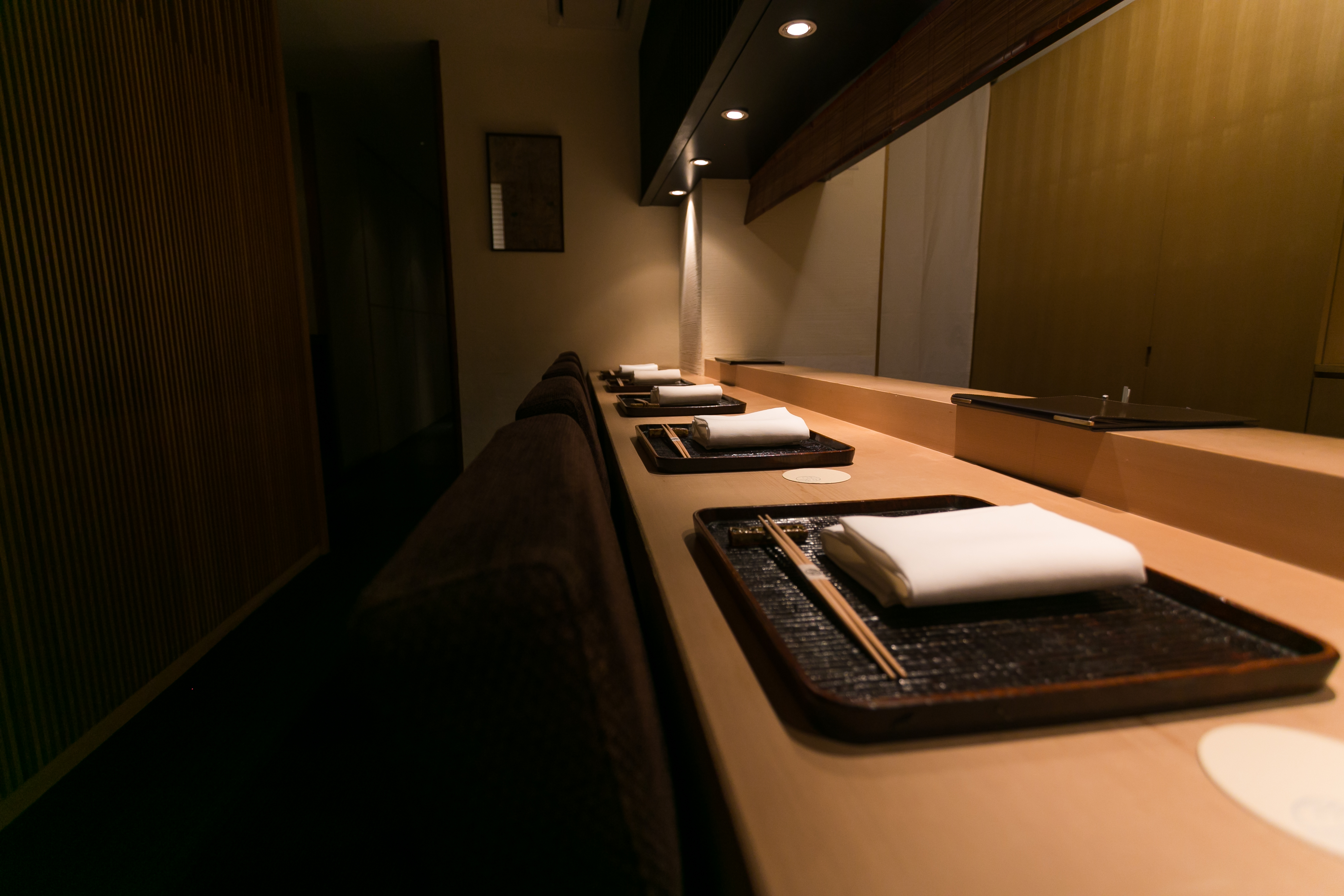
Interior

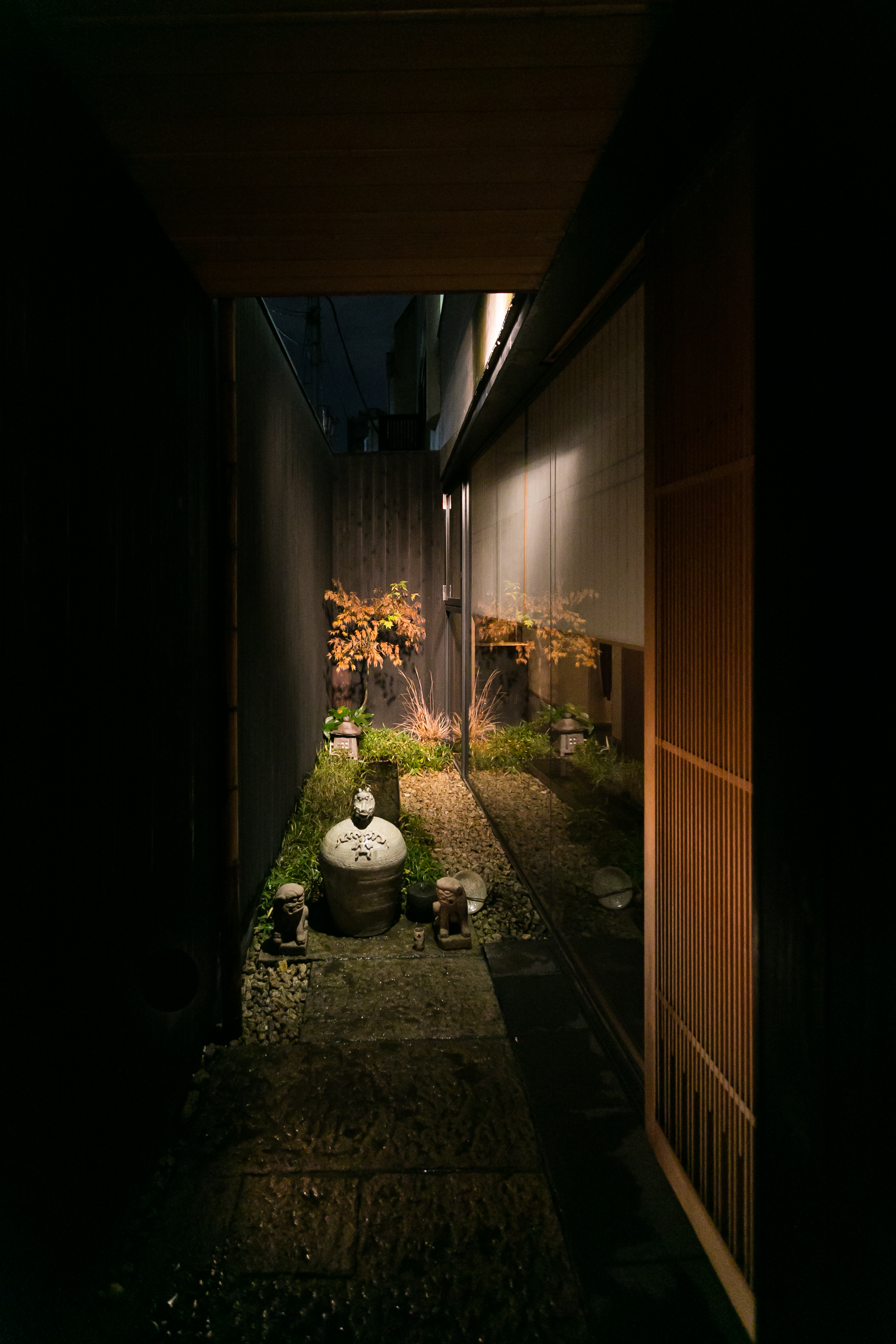
Entrance

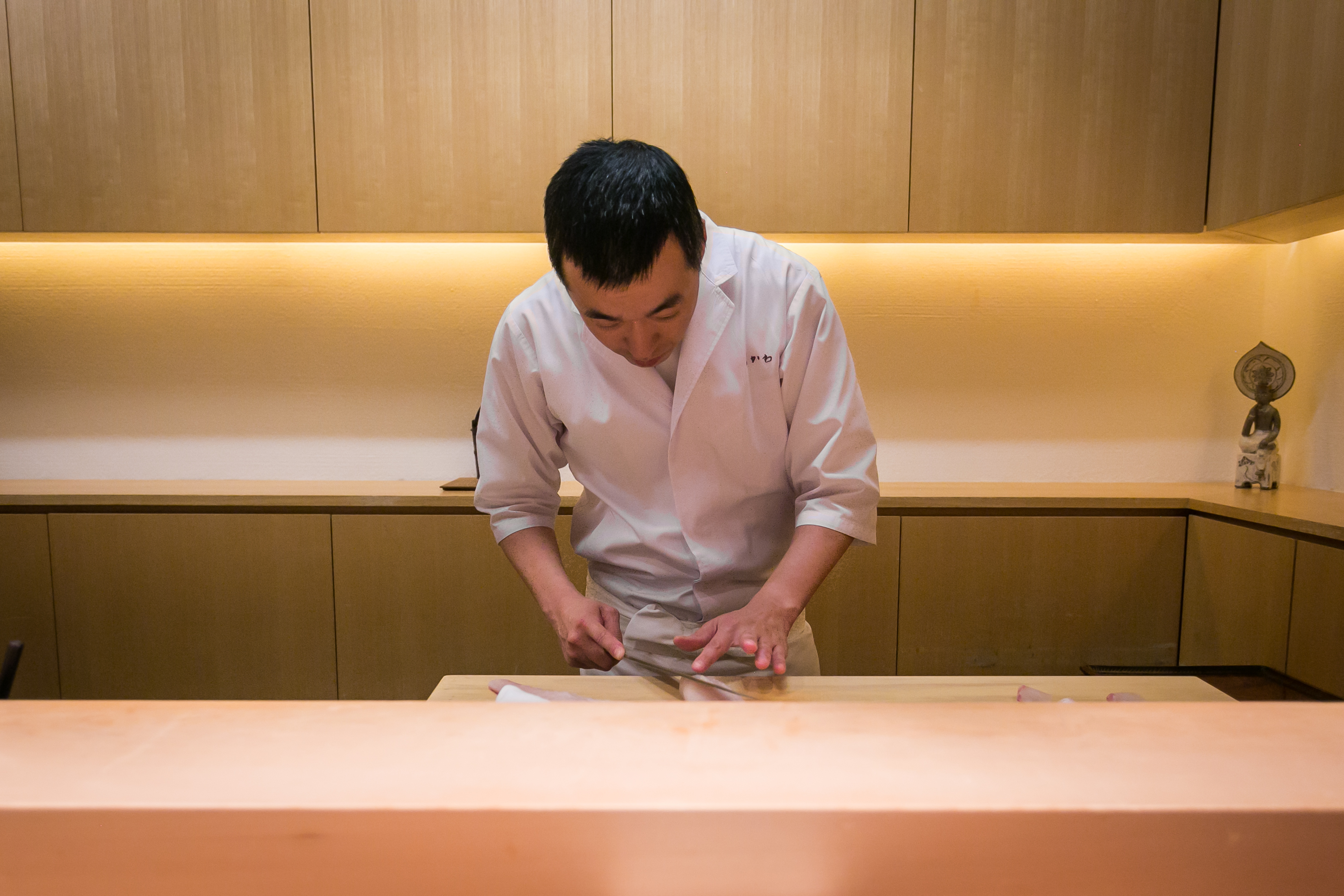
Chef Ishikawa cutting fish

Kagurazaka Ishikawa is a Michelin 3-star kaiseki restaurant in Shinjuku, Tokyo, Japan. It is owned and operated by chef Hideki Ishikawa. It is a personal favorite of chef David Kinch.

The restaurant has four private rooms and can seat seven at the counter.

== See also ==
- List of Japanese restaurants
- List of Michelin three starred restaurants
- List of Michelin-starred restaurants in Japan
