= Kanda (restaurant) =

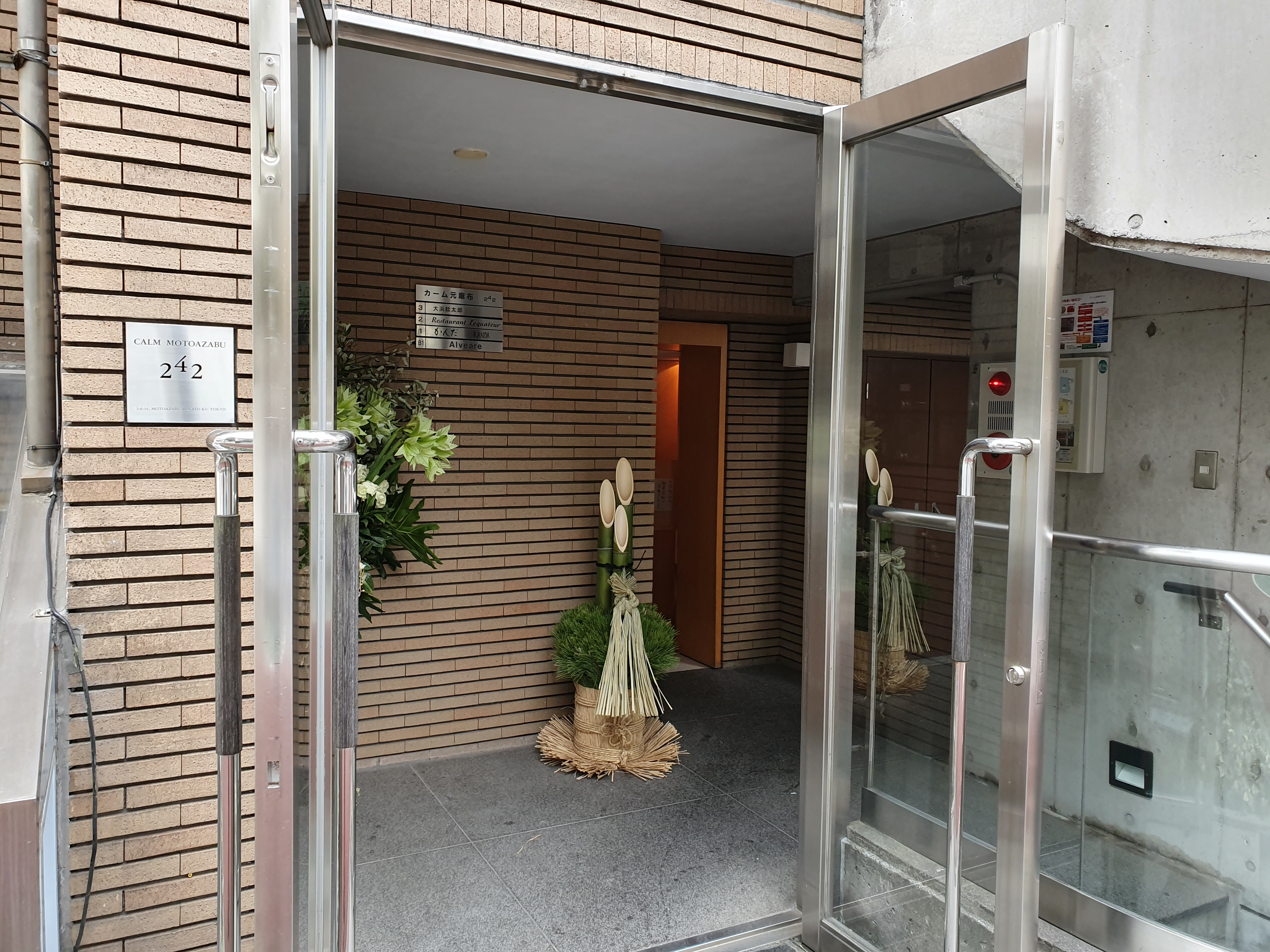
- Image of Kanda restaurant
- Interactive map of Kanda

Restaurant information
- Owner: Hiroyuki Kanda
- Head chef: Hiroyuki Kanda
- Food type: Sushi
- Rating: (Michelin Guide)
- Location: 1F Ka-mu Moto-Azabu Building, 3-6-34 Moto-Azabu, Minato, Tokyo, 106-0046, Japan
- Coordinates: 35.65704°N 139.72872°E
- Reservations: Required
- Website: nihonryori-kanda.com

Kanda is a Michelin 3-star kaiseki restaurant located in Minato, Tokyo. It is owned and operated by chef Hiroyuki Kanda.

== Restaurant ==
Chef Kanda's style been described as elegant simplicity.

== See also ==
- List of Japanese restaurants
- List of Michelin three starred restaurants
- List of Michelin-starred restaurants in Japan
