= Makimura =

- Interactive map of Makimura

Restaurant information
- Established: May 10, 2010
- Owner: Akio Makimura
- Head chef: Akio Makimura
- Food type: Kaiseki
- Rating: (Michelin Guide) (2015-2024)
- Location: MAKIMURA BLD 1F, 3–11–5, Minamiooi, Shinagawa-ku, Tokyo, Shinagawa ward, Tokyo, 140-0001, Japan
- Seating capacity: 14 (6 at counter and 8 at private table)
- Reservations: Required

Makimura (Japanese: まき村), is a Michelin 3-star kappo kaiseki restaurant in Shinagawa, Japan run by chef Akio Makimura. Due to its small size and since there is only one seating per night which usually only has locals, the restaurant is also known for how difficult it is to get a reservation. The restaurant has been open for over 25 years but has been in its current location since May 10, 2010. The closest metro is Ōmorikaigan Station

== Restaurant ==
The tasting menu primarily consists of seafood dishes with influences from Aomori. The signature dish is Tai Chazuke or Sea Bream with green tea flavored rice. The restaurant was awarded 3 Michelin Stars each year from 2015 to 2024 but lost their listing in 2025.

== Awards ==
Tabelog- Gold Award in 2024, Silver Award in 2025 as well as 2019–2023, Bronze Award in 2018, Tokyo Hyakumaiten (popularity/average ratings) in 2021, 2023, and 2025, 3 Michelin Stars (2015–2024).

== See also ==
- List of Japanese restaurants
- List of Michelin three starred restaurants
- List of sushi restaurants
