= Yukimura (restaurant) =

Azabu Yukimura
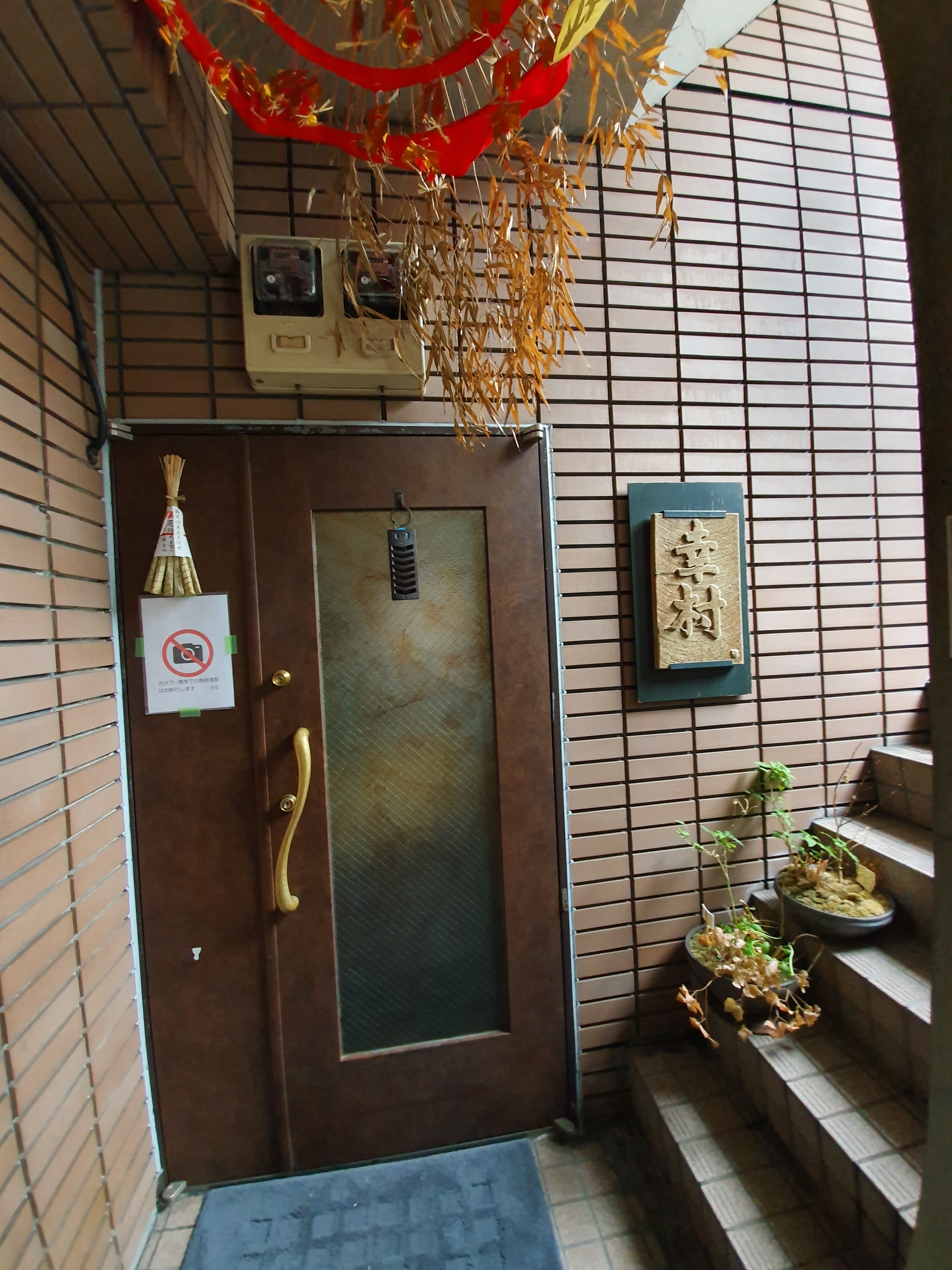
- image of Yukimura restaurant .
- Interactive map of Azabu Yukimura

Restaurant information
- Owner: Jun Yukimura
- Head chef: Jun Yukimura
- Food type: Kaiseki
- Rating: (Michelin Guide)
- Location: 1 Chome−5−5, YUKENAZABU.10 3F, Azabu-Jūban, Minato, Tokyo, 106-0045, Japan
- Coordinates: 35.6573°N 139.7329°E
- Reservations: Required

Azabu Yukimura (麻布幸村), sometimes referred to simply as Yukimura, is a Michelin 3-star kappo restaurant in Azabu-Jūban, Minato, Tokyo, Japan. It is owned and operated by chef Jun Yukimura (幸村 純).

== Restaurant ==
Chef Jun Yukimura opened the restaurant in 2000 after working as a cook in Kyoto for 25 years. Yukimura, located in the Minato ward of Tokyo, contains only nine seats for tables in addition to seating at the counter.

Food is prepared at the restaurant using ingredients sourced primarily from Kyoto.

== See also ==
- List of Japanese restaurants
- List of Michelin three starred restaurants
- List of sushi restaurants
