= L'Osier =

French restaurant in Tokyo, Japan

- Interactive map of L'Osier

Restaurant information
- Established: 1973
- Previous owner: Shiseido Parlor
- Food type: French
- Rating: (Michelin Guide)
- Location: Tokyo, Japan
- Coordinates: 35°40′11″N 139°45′40″E

L'Osier is a Michelin Guide 3-star classic French cuisine restaurant in Chuo-ku, Tokyo. It is located on the second floor of its own two-story building in Ginza.

It was opened in 1973 by Shiseido Parlor, which is operated by Shiseido.

The chef de cuisine is Olivier Chaignon. The restaurant first received its three Michelin stars under chef Bruno Menard.

== See also ==
- List of Michelin-starred restaurants in Japan
