= Ginza Kojyu =

Coordinates: 35.671456°N 139.763023°E

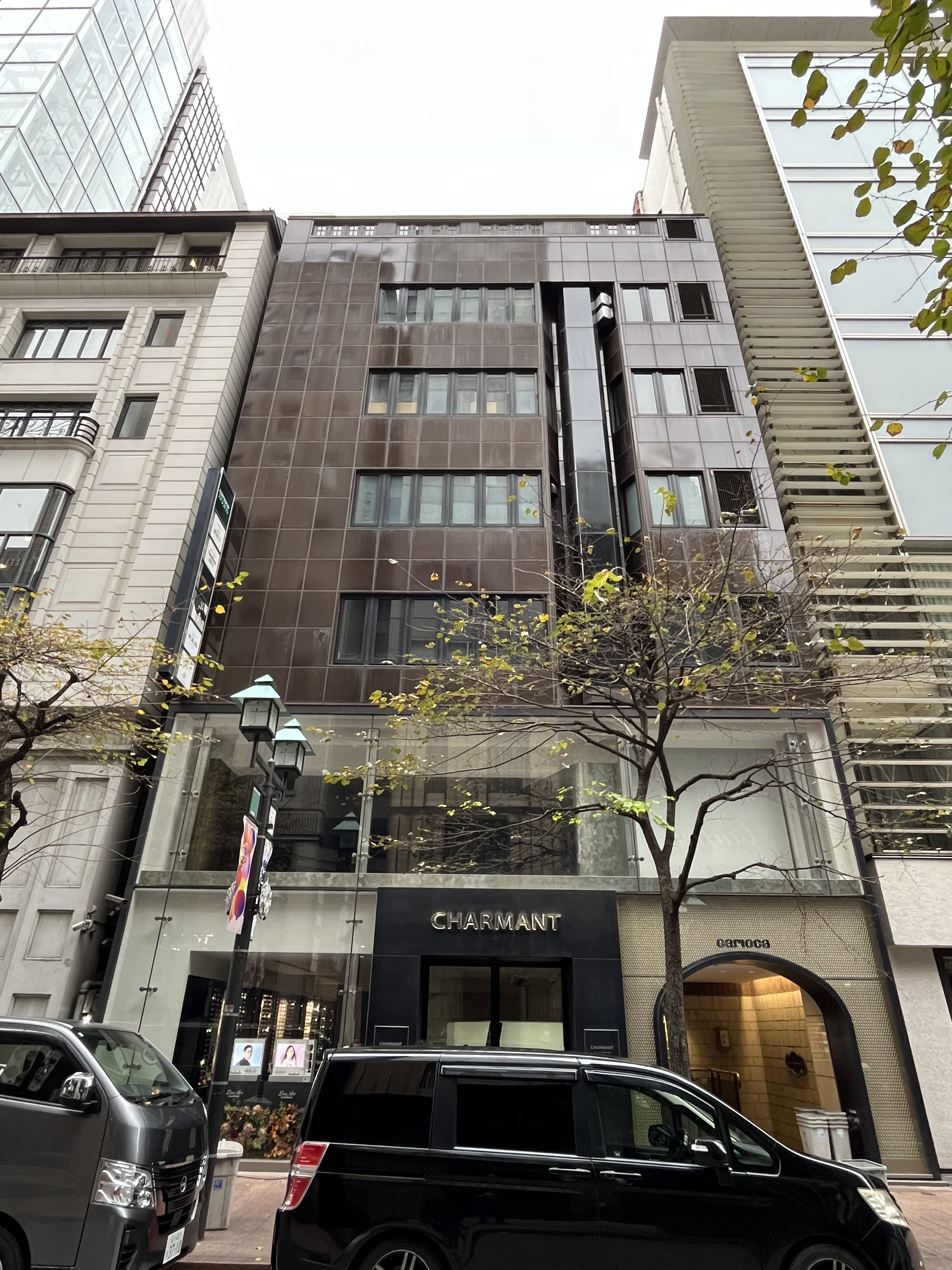
- Interactive map of Ginza Kojyu

Restaurant information
- Owner: Toru Okuda
- Head chef: Toru Okuda
- Food type: Sushi
- Rating: (Michelin Guide)
- Location: Carioca building 4F 5-4-8, Ginza, Chūō, Tokyo, 104-0061, Japan
- Reservations: Required
- Website: www.kojyu.jp

Ginza Kojyu (also known as Ginza Koju) (銀座小十, Ginza Kojū) is a Michelin 2-star kaiseki restaurant in Ginza, Chūō, Tokyo, Japan. It is owned and operated by chef Toru Okuda. It is a personal favorite of chef David Kinch.

== See also ==
- List of Japanese restaurants
- List of Michelin three starred restaurants
- List of sushi restaurants
