= Nihonryori Ryugin =

Ryugin
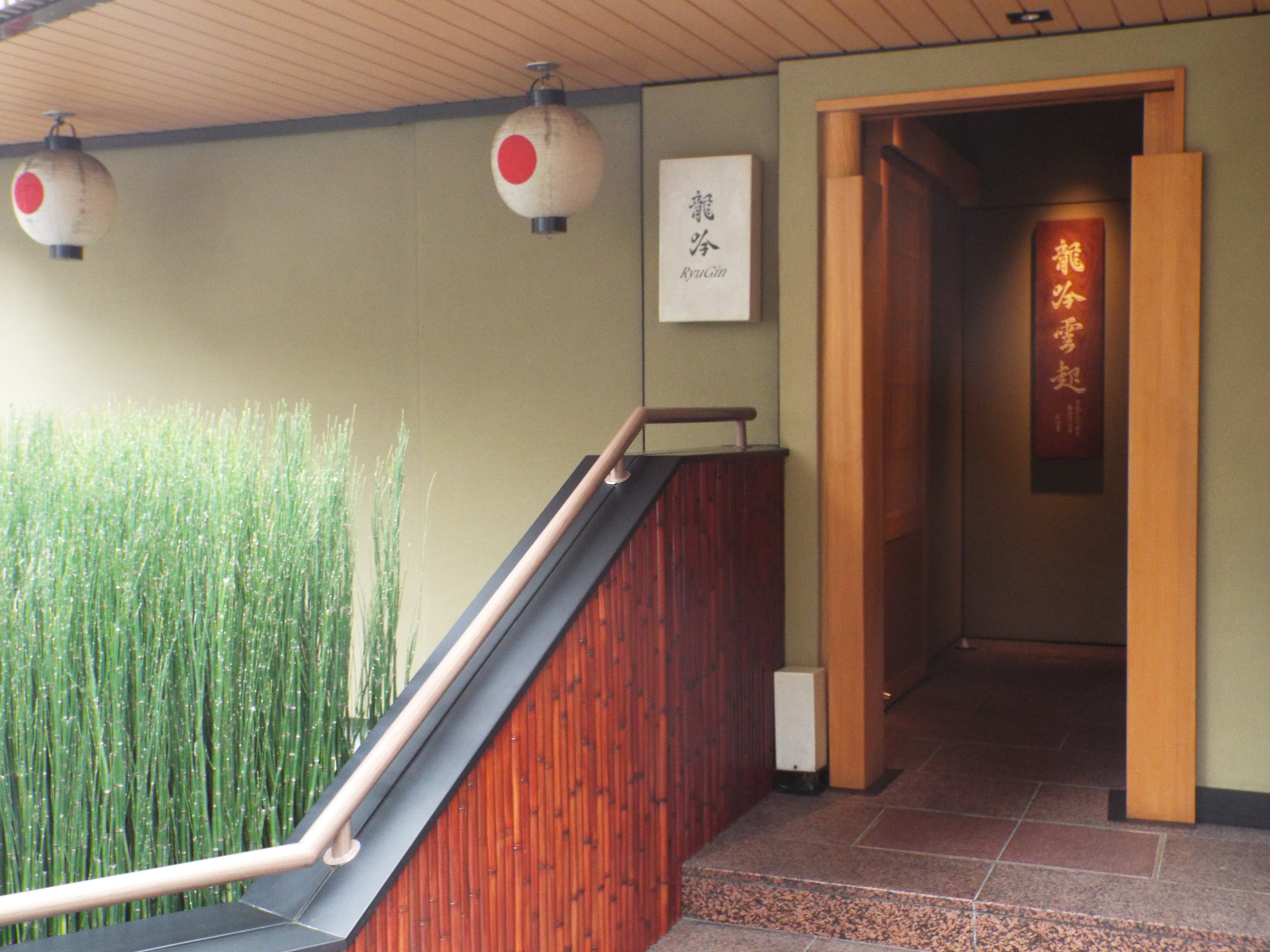
- Entrance
- Interactive map of Ryugin

Restaurant information
- Established: 2003
- Head chef: Seiji Yamamoto
- Food type: Japanese
- Rating: (Michelin Guide)
- Location: 7F Tokyo Midtown Hibiya, 1-1-2 Yurakucho, Chiyoda-ku, Tokyo, 100-0006, Japan
- Coordinates: 35°39′45.9″N 139°43′41.8″E
- Reservations: Required
- Website: www.nihonryori-ryugin.com

Nihonryori Ryugin (Japanese: 日本料理 龍吟 lit. "Japanese cuisine singing dragon") is a Michelin 3-star fusion cuisine restaurant located in Hibiya, Chiyoda-ku, Tokyo. The chef is Seiji Yamamoto (山本 征治).

== History ==
Ryugin was established in 2003 at Roppongi, Minato-ku, Tokyo. The name "Ryugin" comes from the Zen saying "Ryugin sureba kumo okori" (龍吟雲起), which means "clouds appear when the dragon sings."

Ryugin was ranked 20th in the S.Pellegrino World's 50 Best Restaurants in 2011. It moved to its current location in 2018.

== See also ==
- List of Japanese restaurants
- List of Michelin-starred restaurants in Japan
