= Sushi Yoshitake =

Restaurant in Ginza, Tokyo, Japan

- Interactive map of Sushi Yoshitake

Restaurant information
- Owner: Masahiro Yoshitake
- Head chef: Masahiro Yoshitake
- Food type: Sushi
- Rating: (Michelin Guide)
- Location: 8−7−19, すずりゅうビル 3F, Ginza, Chūō, Tokyo, 104-0061, Japan
- Reservations: Required
- Website: sushi-yoshitake.com

Sushi Yoshitake is a Michelin 3-star sushi restaurant in Ginza, Chūō, Tokyo, Japan. It is owned and operated by sushi chef Masahiro Yoshitake.

== Restaurant ==
Masahiro Yoshitake has been described as less traditional than his competitors.

=== Hong Kong ===
Masahiro Yoshitake has expanded overseas opening the eight-seat Michelin 3-star restaurant, Sushi Shikon, in Hong Kong.

== See also ==
- List of Japanese restaurants
- List of Michelin 3-star restaurants
- List of sushi restaurants
