= Sushi Mizutani =

- Interactive map of Sushi Mizutani

Restaurant information
- Established: January 12, 2005
- Closed: October 29, 2016
- Owner: Hachiro Mizutani
- Head chef: Hachiro Mizutani
- Food type: Sushi
- Dress code: Business casual
- Rating: (Michelin Guide)
- Location: 8-7-7 Ginza Juno Building 9F, Tokyo, 104-0061, Japan
- Coordinates: 35.6684143°N 139.7611232°E
- Reservations: Required

Sushi Mizutani (鮨 水谷) was a famous sushi restaurant in Ginza, Chūō, Tokyo, Japan. It was owned and operated by sushi master Hachiro Mizutani. Due to his age, illness, and the planned closing of Tsukiji Market, Mizutani retired and closed the restaurant. The last day of service was October 29, 2016.

== Restaurant ==
The restaurant had no established menu and seated a maximum of 10 patrons at a time. Chef Mizutani was known for being more serious than his counterparts and has been cited by chef, David Kinch, as a personal favorite.

Kelly Wetherille of CNN considered Sushi Mizutani to be among the best five restaurants in Tokyo giving it the high end distinction.

== Controversy ==
In April 2015, Sushi Mizutani was accused of discrimination against foreigners by Chinese journalist Mo Bangfu when it was reported that he attempted to make a reservation at the restaurant and was refused because he was not Japanese. Mo Bangfu expressed his disappointment to the Nikkan Gendai newspaper, adding that he found "the conscious separation of Japanese and foreigners to be discriminatory." The restaurant replied by stating that foreigners are more likely to abandon their reservations, and require them to reserve through a hotel concierge or a credit card company. They maintained that they do not view their policy as discriminatory.

== See also ==
- List of Japanese restaurants
- List of sushi restaurants
