= Azabu-Jūban =

District of Tokyo, Japan

Coordinates: 35°39′17″N 139°44′07″E

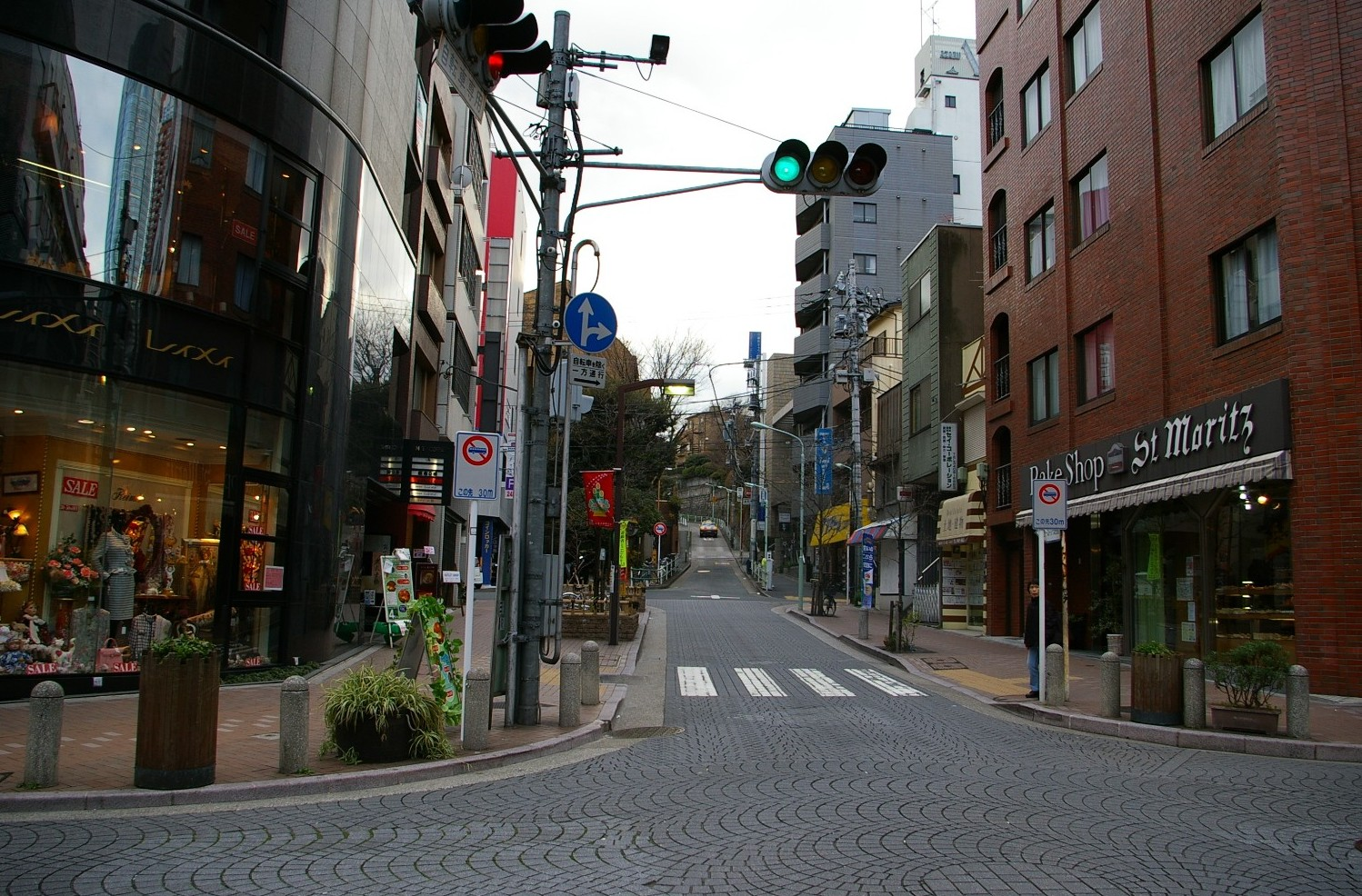
Fashion shop and bakery

Azabu-Jūban (麻布十番) is a district of Minato, Tokyo, Japan. It consists of 1 to 4-chōme. Azabu-Jūban Station is located in this district.

Azabu-Juban is a residential area in central Tokyo with a mixture of Japanese and French shops, restaurants and bars. The convenience of several supermarkets in a central location and the proximity of Hiroo and Roppongi make it one of the most trendy and sought-after residential areas of Tokyo. The main street, a block away from a busy road junction, has a village-like feel with cobblestone paving in some places. This atmosphere is created by the narrow streets, slow-moving traffic, and a mixture of stores operated by older owners. Even the McDonald's has been carefully designed to be architecturally sympathetic.

Azabu-Juban is known for being the main setting of the famous magical girls manga/anime series, Sailor Moon.

== Azabu-Juban matsuri ==
In the middle of August (usually at the beginning or end of the Japanese Obon holiday), Azabu-Juban holds one of the most famous local summer festivals (matsuri) in Tokyo; The event takes place over two days on Saturday and Sunday with the streets being lined with local stalls and food vendors. Traffic is typically blocked from 3:00 to 9:00 pm on both days. During this time, large crowds of festival goers make the main streets largely impassable.

In 2011, this festival was cancelled due to the practice of jishuku (自粛) - voluntary self-restraint - implemented after the 2011 Tōhoku earthquake.

== Azabu-Juban hot spring ==
Until 2008, Azabu-juban had one of several natural onsen (ja:麻布十番温泉) in Tokyo. Every Sunday from 3:00 pm visitors could enjoy traditional Japanese songs (enka) and dancing. The site of the hot spring has since become a car park.

== Education ==
Minato City Board of Education (港区教育委員会). operates public elementary and junior high schools. Azabu-Jūban 1-chōme, and 1-8 ban of 2-chōme, are zoned to Nanzan Elementary School (南山小学校). 9-21 ban of Azabu-Jūban 2-chōme and Azabu-Jūban 3-4-chōme are zoned to Higashimachi Elementary School (東町小学校). All of Azabu-Jūban is zoned to Roppongi Junior High School (六本木中学校).

Area high schools are operated by the Tokyo Metropolitan Board of Education.

== In popular culture ==
The protagonists of the manga and anime series Sailor Moon reside in this district.

The Ginger Root song Juban District refers to the district.

== See also ==
- Arbat (encompassing both the "New Arbat" avenue and the "Old Arbat" street to form what is known as "Arbat district"), similar location in the center of Moscow, Russia.
