= List of Michelin-starred restaurants in Japan =

As of December 2025, a total of 351 restaurants in Japan hold a Michelin-star rating.

Michelin first started reviewing restaurants in Japan in November 2007 when they released the Michelin Guide Tokyo. Guides for Kyoto, Kobe, Nara and Osaka would follow. Tokyo would be expanded to cover Yokohama and Shonan.

The Michelin Guides have been published by the French tire company Michelin since 1900. They were designed as a guide to tell drivers about eateries they recommended to visit and to subtly sponsor their tires, by encouraging drivers to use their cars more and therefore need to replace the tires as they wore out. Over time, the stars that were given out started to become more valuable.

Multiple anonymous Michelin inspectors visit the restaurants several times. They rate the restaurants on five criteria: "quality of products", "mastery of flavor and cooking techniques", "the personality of the chef represented in the dining experience", "value for money", and "consistency between inspectors' visits". Inspectors have at least ten years of expertise and create a list of popular restaurants supported by media reports, reviews, and diner popularity. If they reach a consensus, Michelin awards restaurants from one to three stars based on its evaluation methodology: One star means "high-quality cooking, worth a stop", two stars signify "excellent cooking, worth a detour", and three stars denote "exceptional cuisine, worth a special journey". The stars are not permanent and restaurants are constantly being re-evaluated. If the criteria are not met, the restaurant will lose its stars.

== Chūgoku ==
There are presently no restaurants from Chūgoku with a Michelin star rating from the Michelin Guide. Michelin reviewed restaurants from the region's Tottori Prefecture in 2019 and Okayama Prefecture in 2021 for one year each as part of the Kyoto and Osaka Michelin Guide, before suspending reviewing of this region indefinitely.

Key
1 Michelin star	One Michelin star
2 Michelin stars	Two Michelin stars
3 Michelin stars	Three Michelin stars
—	The restaurant did not receive a star that year
Closed	The restaurant is no longer open

Michelin-starred restaurants
Name	Cuisine	City	2018	2019	2020 No guide	2021	2022–2026 No guide
Kaniyoshi かに吉	Japanese	Tottori	—	2 Michelin stars		—	
Mitsuki みつき	Japanese	Tottori	—	2 Michelin stars		—	
Nakashima なかしま	Japanese	Hiroshima	3 Michelin stars	—		—	
Hiroto	French	Hiroshima	2 Michelin stars	—		—	
Ryoriya Shogetsuan 料理屋 昇月庵	Japanese	Hiroshima	2 Michelin stars	—		—	
Ryoriya Sobiki 料理屋 そうびき	Japanese	Hiroshima	2 Michelin stars	—		—	
Tokaan 桃花庵	Japanese	Hiroshima	2 Michelin stars	—		—	
Kurumasushi くるますし	Japanese	Matsuyama of Ehime Prefecture	2 Michelin stars	—		—	
Sushinoma 鮨の間	Japanese	Matsuyama of Ehime Prefecture	2 Michelin stars	—		—	
Kuikiriryori Happo 喰切料理 八方	Japanese	Okayama	—	—		2 Michelin stars	
Sushi En 鮨 縁	Japanese	Okayama	—	—		2 Michelin stars	
Aoi あおい	Japanese	Okayama	—	—		1 Michelin star	
Ajisobo Mugi 味創房 麦	Japanese	Okayama	—	—		1 Michelin star	
Acca アッカ	Japanese	Okayama	—	—		1 Michelin star	
Uosho 魚祥	Japanese	Okayama	—	—		1 Michelin star	
Essere エッセレ	Japanese	Okayama	—	—		1 Michelin star	
Oryori Sugi 御料理 椙	Japanese	Okayama	—	—		1 Michelin star	
Kaiseki Shoichiro 懐石 昇一楼	Japanese	Okayama	—	—		1 Michelin star	
Kashirajima Restaurant Cucina Terada 頭島レストラン クチーナ テラダ	Italian	Okayama	—	—		1 Michelin star	Closed
Kurashiki Ichie 倉敷 一会	Japanese	Okayama	—	—		1 Michelin star	
Shoun 祥雲	Japanese	Okayama	—	—		1 Michelin star	
Hasunomi はすのみ	Chinese	Okayama	—	—		1 Michelin star	
Bricole ブリコール	Japanese	Okayama	—	—		1 Michelin star	
Honami 穂浪	Japanese	Okayama	—	—		1 Michelin star	
Matsuzushi 松寿司	Japanese	Okayama	—	—		1 Michelin star	
Yamazato 山里	Japanese	Okayama	—	—		1 Michelin star	
Yamamoto 山もと	Japanese	Okayama	—	—		1 Michelin star	
Rakushunsai Sato 楽旬菜 佐とう	Japanese	Okayama	—	—		1 Michelin star	
Lionni レオーニ	French	Okayama	—	—		1 Michelin star	Closed
Reference(s)							

== Hokkaido ==
There are presently no restaurants from Hokkaido with a Michelin star rating from the Michelin Guide. Michelin published two standalone lists for the region in 2012 and 2017, before suspending reviewing of this region indefinitely.

== Hokuriku ==
There are presently no restaurants from Hokuriku with a Michelin star rating from the Michelin Guide. Michelin suspended reviewing of this region indefinitely following 2021.

Key
1 Michelin star	One Michelin star
2 Michelin stars	Two Michelin stars
3 Michelin stars	Three Michelin stars
—	The restaurant did not receive a star that year

Michelin-starred restaurants
Name	Cuisine	City	2016 (40) or (7 as of 11–5–2020)	2017	2018	2019	2020	2021	2022–2026 No guide
Yamazaki 山崎	Japanese	Toyama	3 Michelin stars	—	—	—	—	—	
Araragi	Japanese	Niigata	—	—	—	—	1 Michelin star	—	
Common	Japanese	Niigata	—	—	—	—	1 Michelin star	—	
Hatsunezushi	Sushi	Niigata	—	—	—	—	1 Michelin star	—	
Il Riposo	Italian	Niigata – Sanjō	—	—	—	—	1 Michelin star	—	
Iso	French	Niigata	—	—	—	—	1 Michelin star	—	
Kaiseki Shusekian	Japanese	Niigata	—	—	—	—	1 Michelin star	—	
Kappo Shintaku	Japanese	Niigata – Murakami	—	—	—	—	1 Michelin star	—	
Kyodaizushi 兄弟寿し	Japanese	Niigata	—	—	—	—	2 Michelin stars	—	
L'Armoise	French	Niigata – Nagaoka	—	—	—	—	1 Michelin star	—	
Nabejaya	Japanese	Niigata	—	—	—	—	1 Michelin star	—	
Nabejaya Korin 鍋茶屋 光琳	Japanese	Niigata	—	—	—	—	2 Michelin stars	—	
Nishibori Kaino	Japanese	Niigata	—	—	—	—	1 Michelin star	—	
Osteria Bacco	Italian	Niigata	—	—	—	—	1 Michelin star	—	
Rikisushi Sawata	Sushi	Niigata – Sado	—	—	—	—	1 Michelin star	—	
Sushi Arai	Sushi	Niigata	—	—	—	—	1 Michelin star	—	
Sushi Tokiwa	Sushi	Niigata – Shibata	—	—	—	—	1 Michelin star	—	
Uoyuki	Japanese	Niigata – Tsubame	—	—	—	—	1 Michelin star	—	
Uozen	French	Niigata – Sanjō	—	—	—	—	2 Michelin stars	—	
Asadaya	Japanese	Kanazawa	—	—	—	—	—	1 Michelin star	
Bernard	French	Kanazawa	—	—	—	—	—	1 Michelin star	
Hamagurizaka Maegawa	Yakitori	Kanazawa	—	—	—	—	—	1 Michelin star	
Installation Table ENSO L’asymetrie du calme	Fusion	Kanazawa	—	—	—	—	—	2 Michelin stars	
Ipponsugi Kawashima	Japanese	Nanao	—	—	—	—	—	1 Michelin star	
Kaga Masa	Japanese	Kanazawa	—	—	—	—	—	1 Michelin star	
Kaiseki Nakao	Japanese	Kaga	—	—	—	—	—	1 Michelin star	
Kappo Ikemori	Japanese	Kanazawa	—	—	—	—	—	1 Michelin star	
Kappo Yuzuru	Japanese	Kanazawa	—	—	—	—	—	1 Michelin star	
Kataori	Japanese	Kanazawa	—	—	—	—	—	2 Michelin stars	
Kifune	Japanese	Kanazawa	—	—	—	—	—	1 Michelin star	
Kikuya	Sushi	Kanazawa	—	—	—	—	—	1 Michelin star	
Koizumi	Tempura	Kanazawa	—	—	—	—	—	2 Michelin stars	
Kyoumi Kai	Soba	Kanazawa	—	—	—	—	—	1 Michelin star	
La Clochette	French	Hakui	—	—	—	—	—	1 Michelin star	
La Preeminence	French	Kanazawa	—	—	—	—	—	1 Michelin star	
Les Tonnelles Budoonoki	French	Kanazawa	—	—	—	—	—	2 Michelin stars	
Machiya Kaiseki Rocca	Japanese	Kanazawa	—	—	—	—	—	1 Michelin star	
Makinoncî	French	Kanazawa	—	—	—	—	—	2 Michelin stars	
Matsuya	Japanese	Komatsu	—	—	—	—	—	2 Michelin stars	
Mekumi	Sushi	Nonoichi	—	—	—	—	—	2 Michelin stars	
Miyabino	Japanese	Kanazawa	—	—	—	—	—	1 Michelin star	
Otome Sushi	Sushi	Kanazawa	—	—	—	—	—	2 Michelin stars	
Respiracion	Spanish	Kanazawa	—	—	—	—	—	2 Michelin stars	
Restaurant L’Atelier de Noto	French	Wajima	—	—	—	—	—	1 Michelin star	
Restaurant N	French	Kanazawa	—	—	—	—	—	1 Michelin star	
Ryori Komatsu	Japanese	Kanazawa	—	—	—	—	—	3 Michelin stars	
Ryotei Suginoi	Japanese	Kanazawa	—	—	—	—	—	2 Michelin stars	
Setsuri	Japanese	Kanazawa	—	—	—	—	—	1 Michelin star	
Shokudō Yarn	Fusion	Komatsu	—	—	—	—	—	1 Michelin star	
Shunbo Sakai	Japanese	Kanazawa	—	—	—	—	—	1 Michelin star	
Sushi Kibatani	Sushi	Kanazawa	—	—	—	—	—	1 Michelin star	
Sushi Okauma	Sushi	Kanazawa	—	—	—	—	—	1 Michelin star	
Sushiya Kozakura	Sushi	Kanazawa	—	—	—	—	—	1 Michelin star	
Tominari	Japanese	Wajima	—	—	—	—	—	1 Michelin star	
Tsuzura	Japanese	Komatsu	—	—	—	—	—	2 Michelin stars	
Villa della Pace	French	Nanao	—	—	—	—	—	1 Michelin star	
Wataya	Japanese	Hakusan	—	—	—	—	—	1 Michelin star	
Zeniya	Japanese	Kanazawa	—	—	—	—	—	2 Michelin stars	
Reference(s)									

== Kansai ==
As of the 2025 lists, there are 193 restaurants from the Kansai Region with a Michelin star rating from the Michelin Guide. Michelin currently assesses restaurants in the Kansai cities of Kyoto, Nara, and Osaka. The guide will also begin to assess Kobe and Awaji Island as a standalone list in 2027. This will cover the cities of Kobe, Awaji, Sumoto, and Minamiawaji. The selection will be revealed on February 16, 2027.

== Kantō ==
As of the 2026 Michelin Guide, there are 160 restaurants in the Kanto Region with a Michelin star rating. Michelin presently rates restaurants in the Kanto city of Tokyo.

== Kyushu ==
There are presently no restaurants from Kyushu with a Michelin star rating from the Michelin Guide. Michelin suspended reviewing of this region indefinitely following 2019.

Key
2 Michelin stars	Two Michelin stars
3 Michelin stars	Three Michelin stars
—	The restaurant did not receive a star that year

Michelin-starred restaurants
Name	Cuisine	City	2018	2019	2020–2026 No guide
Sushi Gyoten 鮨 行天	Japanese	Fukuoka	—	3 Michelin stars	
Sushi Sakai 鮨 さかい	Japanese	Fukuoka	—	3 Michelin stars	
Sushidokoro Tsukuta 鮨処 つく田	Japanese	Saga	—	2 Michelin stars	
Agedashi Tempura Tenhiro 揚出し天ぷら 天ひろ	Tempura	Nagasaki	—	2 Michelin stars	
Itamaeryori Doyama 板前料理 堂山	Japanese	Nagasaki	—	2 Michelin stars	
Rurikon 瑠璃紺	Japanese	Kumamoto	2 Michelin stars	—	
Shinyashiki Kofukuron 新屋敷 幸福論	Japanese	Kumamoto	2 Michelin stars	—	
Sushi Sempachi 鮨 仙八	Japanese	Kumamoto	2 Michelin stars	—	
Kikusaiko 菊彩香	Japanese	Ōita	2 Michelin stars	—	
Oryori Hatano 御料理 はた野	Japanese	Ōita	2 Michelin stars	—	
Reference(s)					

== Tōkai ==
There are presently no restaurants from Tōkai with a Michelin star rating from the Michelin Guide. Michelin suspended reviewing of this region indefinitely following 2019.

Key
3 Michelin stars	Three Michelin stars

Michelin-starred restaurants
Name	Cuisine	City	2019	2020–2026 No guide
Hijikata 土方	Japanese	Nagoya, Aichi	3 Michelin stars	
Sushi Ueda 右江田	Japanese	Nagoya, Aichi	3 Michelin stars	
Sushi Komada こま田	Japanese	Ise, Mie	3 Michelin stars	
Reference(s)				

== See also ==
- List of Japanese restaurants
- List of Michelin 3-star restaurants
- List of sushi restaurants
- List of restaurants in Tokyo

== Bibliography ==
- Michelin Guide Fukoga-Saga-Nagasaki 2019 Special Edition. Michelin Travel & Lifestyle. 2019. ISBN 978-4-904337-38-7.
- Michelin Guide Aichi-Gifu-Mie 2019 Special Edition. Michelin Travel & Lifestyle. 2019. ISBN 978-4-904337-20-2.
