= List of Michelin-starred restaurants in Kyoto and Osaka =

As of the 2026 Michelin Guide, there are 179 restaurants in Kyoto and Osaka with a Michelin star rating.

The Michelin Guides have been published by the French tire company Michelin since 1900. They were designed as a guide to tell drivers about eateries they recommended to visit and to subtly sponsor their tires, by encouraging drivers to use their cars more and therefore need to replace the tires as they wore out. Over time, the stars that were given out started to become more valuable.

The Michelin Guide first entered the Japanese market with a list covering Tokyo, debuting in November 2007. Michelin would expand its coverage in Japan by issuing standalone guides for other regions in the country, including starting to review restaurants in Kyoto and Osaka beginning in 2010. Initially, the list covered additional cities in the Kansai Region, being titled Michelin Guide Kyoto, Osaka, Kobe, and Nara. In 2022, Nara spun off into its own standalone guide, while Michelin suspended reviewing restaurants in the city of Kobe as of 2016. Other regions outside of Kansai have also occasionally been paired with the list before removal, such as Tottori Prefecture in 2019 and Okayama Prefecture in 2021, with both being suspended after one year.

Multiple anonymous Michelin inspectors visit the restaurants several times. They rate the restaurants on five criteria: "quality of products", "mastery of flavor and cooking techniques", "the personality of the chef represented in the dining experience", "value for money", and "consistency between inspectors' visits". Inspectors have at least ten years of expertise and create a list of popular restaurants supported by media reports, reviews, and diner popularity. If they reach a consensus, Michelin awards restaurants from one to three stars based on its evaluation methodology: One star means "high-quality cooking, worth a stop", two stars signify "excellent cooking, worth a detour", and three stars denote "exceptional cuisine, worth a special journey". The stars are not permanent and restaurants are constantly being re-evaluated. If the criteria are not met, the restaurant will lose its stars.

== Lists ==
=== Kyoto and Osaka (2017–2026) ===
Key
1 Michelin star	One Michelin star
2 Michelin stars	Two Michelin stars
3 Michelin stars	Three Michelin stars
—	The restaurant did not receive a star that year
Closed	The restaurant is no longer open

==== 2021–2026 ====
Michelin-starred restaurants
Name	Cuisine	Location	2021	2022	2023	2024	2025	2026
A Canto	Italian	Osaka	—	1 Michelin star	1 Michelin star	1 Michelin star	1 Michelin star	1 Michelin star
Ad Hoc	French	Osaka	1 Michelin star	1 Michelin star	1 Michelin star	1 Michelin star	1 Michelin star	1 Michelin star
Agnel D'or	French	Osaka	1 Michelin star	1 Michelin star	1 Michelin star	1 Michelin star	1 Michelin star	1 Michelin star
Aji Fukushima	Japanese	Kyoto	1 Michelin star	1 Michelin star	1 Michelin star	—	—	—
Aji Rakuzan	Japanese	Kyoto	1 Michelin star	Closed				
Ajikitcho Bumbuan	Japanese	Osaka	1 Michelin star	1 Michelin star	1 Michelin star	1 Michelin star	1 Michelin star	1 Michelin star
Ajikitcho Horieten	Japanese	Osaka	1 Michelin star	1 Michelin star	1 Michelin star	1 Michelin star	1 Michelin star	1 Michelin star
Akai	Japanese	Kyoto	1 Michelin star	1 Michelin star	1 Michelin star	—	—	—
Alarde	Spanish	Osaka	1 Michelin star	1 Michelin star	1 Michelin star	1 Michelin star	1 Michelin star	1 Michelin star
Anpeiji	French	Kyoto	—	—	—	1 Michelin star	1 Michelin star	1 Michelin star
Aoike	French	Kyoto	1 Michelin star	1 Michelin star	—	—	—	—
Atelier Hanada	Chinese	Osaka	—	—	—	—	—	1 Michelin star
Ayamedo (Note: Restaurant re-assessed to Bib Gourmand designation as of 2023)	Japanese	Osaka	1 Michelin star	1 Michelin star	—	—	—	—
Ayamuya (Note: Restaurant re-assessed to Bib Gourmand designation as of 2024)	Japanese	Osaka	1 Michelin star	1 Michelin star	1 Michelin star	—	—	—
Ayanokoji Karatsu	Japanese	Kyoto	1 Michelin star	1 Michelin star	1 Michelin star	1 Michelin star	1 Michelin star	1 Michelin star
Bini	Italian	Kyoto	1 Michelin star	1 Michelin star	1 Michelin star	1 Michelin star	1 Michelin star	1 Michelin star
Byeoleeya	Korean	Kyoto	—	—	—	—	—	1 Michelin star
Cainoya	Innovative	Kyoto	1 Michelin star	1 Michelin star	—	—	—	—
Capi	Innovative	Osaka	—	1 Michelin star	1 Michelin star	1 Michelin star	1 Michelin star	1 Michelin star
Cenci	Italian	Kyoto	—	1 Michelin star	1 Michelin star	1 Michelin star	1 Michelin star	1 Michelin star
Chi-Fu	Chinese	Osaka	1 Michelin star	1 Michelin star	1 Michelin star	1 Michelin star	1 Michelin star	1 Michelin star
Chihiro	Japanese	Kyoto	2 Michelin stars	2 Michelin stars	—	—	—	—
Choraku	Chinese	Osaka	1 Michelin star	1 Michelin star	—	—	—	—
Différence	French	Osaka	1 Michelin star	1 Michelin star	1 Michelin star	1 Michelin star	1 Michelin star	1 Michelin star
Dodici	Italian	Kyoto	—	—	1 Michelin star	1 Michelin star	1 Michelin star	1 Michelin star
Doppo	Italian	Kyoto	—	—	—	1 Michelin star	1 Michelin star	2 Michelin stars
Droit	French	Kyoto	1 Michelin star	1 Michelin star	1 Michelin star	1 Michelin star	1 Michelin star	1 Michelin star
Empathie	French	Osaka	—	—	—	—	—	1 Michelin star
Enomoto	Japanese	Osaka	—	1 Michelin star	Closed			
Enyuan Kobayashi	Japanese	Kyoto	—	—	1 Michelin star	1 Michelin star	1 Michelin star	1 Michelin star
Fuguryori Tomoe	Seafood	Kyoto	1 Michelin star	—	—	—	—	—
Fujii	Japanese	Kyoto	1 Michelin star	—	—	—	—	—
Funaokayama Shimizu	Japanese	Kyoto	1 Michelin star	1 Michelin star	1 Michelin star	1 Michelin star	—	—
Fujiya 1935	Innovative	Osaka	2 Michelin stars	2 Michelin stars	2 Michelin stars	2 Michelin stars	2 Michelin stars	2 Michelin stars
Fushimimachi Kakoiyama	Japanese	Osaka	—	—	1 Michelin star	1 Michelin star	1 Michelin star	1 Michelin star
Germoglio	Italian	Kyoto	—	—	—	—	—	1 Michelin star
Gion Fukushi	Japanese	Kyoto	1 Michelin star	1 Michelin star	1 Michelin star	1 Michelin star	1 Michelin star	1 Michelin star
Gion Iwasaki	Japanese	Kyoto	1 Michelin star	1 Michelin star	—	—	—	—
Gion Kajisho	Japanese	Kyoto	1 Michelin star	1 Michelin star	1 Michelin star	1 Michelin star	—	—
Gion Kida	Japanese	Kyoto	1 Michelin star	1 Michelin star	1 Michelin star	1 Michelin star	1 Michelin star	1 Michelin star
Gion Mamma	Japanese	Kyoto	—	1 Michelin star	1 Michelin star	1 Michelin star	1 Michelin star	—
Gion Maruyama	Japanese	Kyoto	2 Michelin stars	2 Michelin stars	2 Michelin stars	2 Michelin stars	2 Michelin stars	2 Michelin stars
Gion Matayoshi	Japanese	Kyoto	2 Michelin stars	2 Michelin stars	2 Michelin stars	2 Michelin stars	2 Michelin stars	2 Michelin stars
Gion Matsudaya	Japanese	Kyoto	1 Michelin star	—	—	—	—	—
Gion Nishikawa	Japanese	Kyoto	2 Michelin stars	2 Michelin stars	2 Michelin stars	2 Michelin stars	2 Michelin stars	2 Michelin stars
Gion Nishimura	Japanese	Kyoto	1 Michelin star	1 Michelin star	1 Michelin star	1 Michelin star	—	—
Gion Okada	Japanese	Kyoto	1 Michelin star	1 Michelin star	1 Michelin star	1 Michelin star	1 Michelin star	1 Michelin star
Gion Owatari	Japanese	Kyoto	2 Michelin stars	2 Michelin stars	2 Michelin stars	1 Michelin star	1 Michelin star	1 Michelin star
Gion Rikichi	Japanese	Kyoto	1 Michelin star	—	—	—	—	—
Gion Sasaki	Japanese	Kyoto	3 Michelin stars	3 Michelin stars	3 Michelin stars	3 Michelin stars	3 Michelin stars	3 Michelin stars
Gion Sushi Tadayasu	Japanese	Kyoto	1 Michelin star	1 Michelin star	—	—	—	—
Godan Miyazawa	Japanese	Kyoto	1 Michelin star	1 Michelin star	1 Michelin star	1 Michelin star	1 Michelin star	1 Michelin star
Gokomachi Tagawa	Japanese	Kyoto	1 Michelin star	1 Michelin star	1 Michelin star	1 Michelin star	1 Michelin star	1 Michelin star
Gosho Iwasaki	Japanese	Kyoto	1 Michelin star	1 Michelin star	1 Michelin star	1 Michelin star	1 Michelin star	1 Michelin star
Hachi	Japanese	Osaka	—	—	—	—	—	1 Michelin star
Hajime	Innovative	Osaka	3 Michelin stars	3 Michelin stars	3 Michelin stars	3 Michelin stars	3 Michelin stars	3 Michelin stars
HANA-Kitcho	Japanese	Kyoto	1 Michelin star	1 Michelin star	1 Michelin star	1 Michelin star	1 Michelin star	1 Michelin star
Hatsu	Italian / Japanese	Osaka	1 Michelin star	Closed				
Higashichaya Nakamura	Japanese	Osaka	1 Michelin star	1 Michelin star	1 Michelin star	1 Michelin star	1 Michelin star	1 Michelin star
Higashiyama Ogata	Japanese	Kyoto	—	—	—	—	—	1 Michelin star
Higashiyama Tsukasa	Japanese	Kyoto	—	—	—	—	—	1 Michelin star
Higashiyama Yoshihisa	Japanese	Kyoto	1 Michelin star	1 Michelin star	1 Michelin star	1 Michelin star	1 Michelin star	2 Michelin stars
Hiraishi	Japanese	Osaka	1 Michelin star	1 Michelin star	1 Michelin star	1 Michelin star	1 Michelin star	1 Michelin star
Hiramatsu Kodaiji	French	Kyoto	1 Michelin star	1 Michelin star	1 Michelin star	1 Michelin star	1 Michelin star	1 Michelin star
Honke Tankuma Honten	Japanese	Kyoto	1 Michelin star	1 Michelin star	1 Michelin star	1 Michelin star	—	—
Honkogetsu	Japanese	Osaka	2 Michelin stars	2 Michelin stars	—	—	—	—
Hokkoriya	Japanese	Kyoto	1 Michelin star	Closed				
Hyotei	Japanese	Kyoto	3 Michelin stars	3 Michelin stars	3 Michelin stars	3 Michelin stars	3 Michelin stars	3 Michelin stars
Ichijooji Norihide	Japanese	Kyoto	1 Michelin star	1 Michelin star	1 Michelin star	1 Michelin star	—	—
Ichiju Nisai Ueno Minoten	Japanese	Minōh	2 Michelin stars	1 Michelin star	1 Michelin star	1 Michelin star	1 Michelin star	1 Michelin star
IDÉAL Bistro	French	Osaka	1 Michelin star	1 Michelin star	1 Michelin star	1 Michelin star	1 Michelin star	1 Michelin star
Il Centrino	Italian	Osaka	1 Michelin star	1 Michelin star	1 Michelin star	1 Michelin star	1 Michelin star	—
Ima	French	Kyoto	—	—	—	—	—	1 Michelin star
Iroha	Japanese	Osaka	1 Michelin star	1 Michelin star	1 Michelin star	1 Michelin star	1 Michelin star	1 Michelin star
Isshisoden Nakamura	Japanese	Kyoto	3 Michelin stars	3 Michelin stars	3 Michelin stars	3 Michelin stars	3 Michelin stars	3 Michelin stars
Ito	French / Japanese	Kyoto	1 Michelin star	—	—	—	—	—
Iwaki	Japanese	Osaka	1 Michelin star	1 Michelin star	1 Michelin star	1 Michelin star	1 Michelin star	1 Michelin star
Iwasaki	Japanese	Kyoto	1 Michelin star	—	—	—	—	—
Jean-Georges at The Shinmonzen	French	Kyoto	—	—	—	—	1 Michelin star	1 Michelin star
Jiki Miyazawa	Japanese	Kyoto	1 Michelin star	1 Michelin star	1 Michelin star	1 Michelin star	1 Michelin star	—
Kagaman	Innovative	Osaka	1 Michelin star	1 Michelin star	—	—	—	—
Kahala	Innovative	Osaka	2 Michelin stars	2 Michelin stars	2 Michelin stars	2 Michelin stars	2 Michelin stars	2 Michelin stars
Kaiseki Honda	Japanese	Osaka	1 Michelin star	—	—	—	—	—
Kaishoku Shimizu	Japanese	Osaka	1 Michelin star	1 Michelin star	1 Michelin star	1 Michelin star	1 Michelin star	1 Michelin star
Kako Okamoto	Japanese	Kyoto	1 Michelin star	1 Michelin star	1 Michelin star	1 Michelin star	1 Michelin star	1 Michelin star
Kamanza Nagashima	Japanese	Kyoto	1 Michelin star	1 Michelin star	1 Michelin star	1 Michelin star	1 Michelin star	—
Kamigamo Akiyama	Japanese	Kyoto	1 Michelin star	1 Michelin star	1 Michelin star	1 Michelin star	—	—
Kamigatachuka Shintani	Chinese	Osaka	—	—	1 Michelin star	1 Michelin star	1 Michelin star	1 Michelin star
Kanamean Nishitomiya	Japanese	Kyoto	1 Michelin star	1 Michelin star	1 Michelin star	1 Michelin star	1 Michelin star	1 Michelin star
Kappo Hashimoto	Japanese	Osaka	1 Michelin star	1 Michelin star	—	—	—	—
Kappo Hassun	Japanese	Kyoto	1 Michelin star	1 Michelin star	1 Michelin star	1 Michelin star	1 Michelin star	1 Michelin star
Kashiwaya Osaka Kitashinchi	Japanese	Osaka	—	—	—	1 Michelin star	1 Michelin star	1 Michelin star
Kashiwaya Osaka Senriyama	Japanese	Osaka	3 Michelin stars	3 Michelin stars	3 Michelin stars	3 Michelin stars	3 Michelin stars	3 Michelin stars
Katamachi Kawaguchi	Japanese	Osaka	—	—	—	—	1 Michelin star	1 Michelin star
Kawahara	Japanese	Osaka	1 Michelin star	1 Michelin star	1 Michelin star	—	—	—
Kenninji Gion Maruyama	Japanese	Kyoto	2 Michelin stars	2 Michelin stars	2 Michelin stars	2 Michelin stars	2 Michelin stars	2 Michelin stars
Kentan Horibe	Japanese	Kyoto	1 Michelin star	1 Michelin star	1 Michelin star	1 Michelin star	1 Michelin star	1 Michelin star
Kenya	Japanese	Kyoto	—	—	1 Michelin star	1 Michelin star	1 Michelin star	1 Michelin star
Kikunoi Honten	Japanese	Kyoto	3 Michelin stars	3 Michelin stars	3 Michelin stars	3 Michelin stars	3 Michelin stars	3 Michelin stars
Kikunoi Roan	Japanese	Kyoto	2 Michelin stars	2 Michelin stars	2 Michelin stars	2 Michelin stars	2 Michelin stars	2 Michelin stars
Kikunoi Sushi Ao	Japanese	Kyoto	—	—	—	—	1 Michelin star	1 Michelin star
Kinobu	Japanese	Kyoto	1 Michelin star	1 Michelin star	1 Michelin star	1 Michelin star	1 Michelin star	1 Michelin star
Kitahachi (Note: Restaurant lost its stars in 2022 following restricting its booking access for the general public)	Seafood	Kishiwada	2 Michelin stars	—	—	—	—	—
Kitamura	Japanese	Osaka	1 Michelin star	—	—	—	—	—
Kitashinchi Fukudatei	Steakhouse	Osaka	1 Michelin star	1 Michelin star	1 Michelin star	—	—	—
Kiyama	Japanese	Kyoto	1 Michelin star	1 Michelin star	1 Michelin star	1 Michelin star	1 Michelin star	1 Michelin star
Kodaiji Jugyuan	Japanese	Kyoto	1 Michelin star	1 Michelin star	1 Michelin star	1 Michelin star	2 Michelin stars	2 Michelin stars
Kodaiji Wakuden	Japanese	Kyoto	2 Michelin stars	2 Michelin stars	2 Michelin stars	2 Michelin stars	2 Michelin stars	2 Michelin stars
Koga	French	Kyoto	—	—	—	—	—	1 Michelin star
KOKE	Innovative	Kyoto	—	1 Michelin star	1 Michelin star	1 Michelin star	1 Michelin star	1 Michelin star
Kokyu	Japanese	Kyoto	1 Michelin star	1 Michelin star	1 Michelin star	1 Michelin star	1 Michelin star	1 Michelin star
Konoha	Japanese	Osaka	—	1 Michelin star	1 Michelin star	1 Michelin star	1 Michelin star	1 Michelin star
Koryu	Japanese	Osaka	2 Michelin stars	2 Michelin stars	2 Michelin stars	2 Michelin stars	2 Michelin stars	2 Michelin stars
KushinGarando (Note: Was named U Garando until 2025)	Chinese	Osaka	—	—	—	1 Michelin star	1 Michelin star	1 Michelin star
Kyo Seika	Chinese	Kyoto	1 Michelin star	1 Michelin star	1 Michelin star	1 Michelin star	1 Michelin star	1 Michelin star
Kyoboshi	Japanese	Kyoto	1 Michelin star	1 Michelin star	1 Michelin star	1 Michelin star	1 Michelin star	1 Michelin star
Kyokaiseki Kichisen	Japanese	Kyoto	2 Michelin stars	2 Michelin stars	2 Michelin stars	2 Michelin stars	2 Michelin stars	2 Michelin stars
Kyomachiryori Mitsuya	Japanese	Osaka	1 Michelin star	1 Michelin star	1 Michelin star	Closed		
Kyoryori Fujimoto	Japanese	Kyoto	1 Michelin star	1 Michelin star	1 Michelin star	1 Michelin star	1 Michelin star	1 Michelin star
Kyotenjin Noguchi	Japanese	Kyoto	2 Michelin stars	2 Michelin stars	—	—	—	—
Kyoto Kiccho Arashiyama (Note: Also known as Kitcho Arashiyama Honten)	Japanese	Kyoto	3 Michelin stars	—	—	—	—	—
La Baie	French	Osaka	1 Michelin star	1 Michelin star	1 Michelin star	1 Michelin star	1 Michelin star	1 Michelin star
La Bécasse	French	Osaka	1 Michelin star	1 Michelin star	1 Michelin star	1 Michelin star	1 Michelin star	1 Michelin star
La Biographie	French	Kyoto	—	1 Michelin star	1 Michelin star	1 Michelin star	1 Michelin star	1 Michelin star
La Buche	French	Kyoto	—	—	—	1 Michelin star	1 Michelin star	1 Michelin star
La Casa Tom Curiosa	Italian	Osaka	1 Michelin star	1 Michelin star	1 Michelin star	1 Michelin star	—	—
La Cime	French	Osaka	2 Michelin stars	2 Michelin stars	2 Michelin stars	2 Michelin stars	2 Michelin stars	2 Michelin stars
La Kanro	French	Osaka	1 Michelin star	—	—	—	—	—
La Lucciola	Italian	Osaka	1 Michelin star	1 Michelin star	1 Michelin star	1 Michelin star	—	—
Le Pont de Ciel	French	Osaka	1 Michelin star	1 Michelin star	—	1 Michelin star	1 Michelin star	1 Michelin star
Liaison	French	Osaka	1 Michelin star	1 Michelin star	1 Michelin star	1 Michelin star	Closed	
Lumière	French	Osaka	1 Michelin star	Closed				
Lurra°	Innovative	Kyoto	1 Michelin star	1 Michelin star	1 Michelin star	1 Michelin star	—	1 Michelin star
Maeda	Japanese	Kyoto	3 Michelin stars	3 Michelin stars	3 Michelin stars	—	—	—
Maeshiba Ryoriten	French	Osaka	1 Michelin star	Closed				
Maison Tateru Yoshino	French	Osaka	1 Michelin star	1 Michelin star	1 Michelin star	1 Michelin star	Closed	
Man'u	Japanese	Osaka	1 Michelin star	1 Michelin star	1 Michelin star	—	—	—
Manjuji Hakuran	Japanese	Kyoto	—	—	—	—	—	1 Michelin star
Mashiro	French	Kyoto	—	—	—	1 Michelin star	1 Michelin star	1 Michelin star
Masuda	Japanese	Osaka	1 Michelin star	1 Michelin star	1 Michelin star	1 Michelin star	1 Michelin star	1 Michelin star
Matsuzushi Tanigawa	Japanese	Osaka	—	—	—	1 Michelin star	1 Michelin star	1 Michelin star
Milpa	Mexican	Osaka	—	—	—	—	1 Michelin star	1 Michelin star
Mirei	Japanese	Kyoto	1 Michelin star	1 Michelin star	1 Michelin star	1 Michelin star	1 Michelin star	1 Michelin star
Miyagawacho Hotta	Japanese	Kyoto	—	—	—	—	—	1 Michelin star
Miyamaso	Japanese	Kyoto	2 Michelin stars	2 Michelin stars	2 Michelin stars	2 Michelin stars	2 Michelin stars	3 Michelin stars
Miyamoto	Japanese	Osaka	2 Michelin stars	2 Michelin stars	2 Michelin stars	2 Michelin stars	2 Michelin stars	2 Michelin stars
Miyawaki	Japanese	Kyoto	—	—	—	—	1 Michelin star	1 Michelin star
Mizai	Japanese	Kyoto	3 Michelin stars	3 Michelin stars	3 Michelin stars	3 Michelin stars	3 Michelin stars	3 Michelin stars
Mizuno	Japanese	Kyoto	—	—	—	1 Michelin star	1 Michelin star	1 Michelin star
MOKO	French	Kyoto	—	—	—	1 Michelin star	1 Michelin star	1 Michelin star
Mokubei	Japanese	Kyoto	1 Michelin star	1 Michelin star	1 Michelin star	1 Michelin star	—	—
Motoï	French	Kyoto	1 Michelin star	1 Michelin star	1 Michelin star	—	—	—
Mube	Japanese	Kyoto	—	—	—	—	—	1 Michelin star
Muni Alain Ducasse	French	Kyoto	—	1 Michelin star	1 Michelin star	1 Michelin star	Closed	
Muni La Terasse	French	Kyoto	—	1 Michelin star	1 Michelin star	—	—	Closed
Muroi	Japanese	Kyoto	1 Michelin star	1 Michelin star	—	—	—	—
Muromachi Wakuden	Japanese	Kyoto	1 Michelin star	1 Michelin star	1 Michelin star	1 Michelin star	1 Michelin star	1 Michelin star
Muromachi Yui	Japanese	Kyoto	—	—	—	1 Michelin star	1 Michelin star	2 Michelin stars
Ñ	Spanish	Osaka	1 Michelin star	1 Michelin star	1 Michelin star	1 Michelin star	1 Michelin star	1 Michelin star
Nakamitsu	Japanese	Kyoto	—	—	—	—	1 Michelin star	1 Michelin star
Nakatsuka	French	Kyoto	1 Michelin star	1 Michelin star	1 Michelin star	1 Michelin star	—	—
Nakazen	Japanese	Kyoto	1 Michelin star	1 Michelin star	1 Michelin star	1 Michelin star	1 Michelin star	—
Naniwakappo Noboru	Japanese	Osaka	—	—	1 Michelin star	1 Michelin star	—	—
Naniwaryori Yu	Japanese	Osaka	1 Michelin star	1 Michelin star	1 Michelin star	1 Michelin star	1 Michelin star	1 Michelin star
Naruya	Japanese	Kyoto	1 Michelin star	1 Michelin star	—	—	—	—
Nent	French	Osaka	—	—	1 Michelin star	1 Michelin star	—	—
Nijo Minami	Japanese	Kyoto	—	—	—	1 Michelin star	1 Michelin star	1 Michelin star
Nijojo Furuta	Japanese	Kyoto	1 Michelin star	1 Michelin star	1 Michelin star	1 Michelin star	1 Michelin star	1 Michelin star
Nikunotakumi Miyoshi	Steakhouse	Kyoto	1 Michelin star	1 Michelin star	—	—	—	—
Nishijin Fujiyoshi	Japanese	Osaka	1 Michelin star	1 Michelin star	1 Michelin star	1 Michelin star	—	—
Nishino	Japanese	Osaka	1 Michelin star	1 Michelin star	1 Michelin star	1 Michelin star	1 Michelin star	1 Michelin star
Nishishinsaibashi Yuno	Japanese	Osaka	1 Michelin star	1 Michelin star	1 Michelin star	1 Michelin star	1 Michelin star	1 Michelin star
Nishitemma Ichigaya	Japanese	Osaka	—	—	—	—	1 Michelin star	1 Michelin star
Nishitenma Nakamura	Japanese	Osaka	1 Michelin star	1 Michelin star	1 Michelin star	1 Michelin star	1 Michelin star	—
Noguchi Tsunagu	Japanese	Kyoto	1 Michelin star	1 Michelin star	1 Michelin star	1 Michelin star	1 Michelin star	1 Michelin star
Numata	Japanese	Osaka	—	2 Michelin stars	2 Michelin stars	2 Michelin stars	2 Michelin stars	2 Michelin stars
Numata Sou	Japanese	Osaka	—	—	—	—	—	1 Michelin star
Ogata	Japanese	Kyoto	2 Michelin stars	2 Michelin stars	2 Michelin stars	2 Michelin stars	2 Michelin stars	2 Michelin stars
Ogawa	Japanese	Kyoto	1 Michelin star	1 Michelin star	1 Michelin star	1 Michelin star	1 Michelin star	1 Michelin star
Oimatsu Hisano	Japanese	Osaka	1 Michelin star	1 Michelin star	1 Michelin star	1 Michelin star	2 Michelin stars	2 Michelin stars
Oimatsu Kitagawa	Japanese	Osaka	1 Michelin star	1 Michelin star	1 Michelin star	1 Michelin star	1 Michelin star	1 Michelin star
Okina	Japanese	Kyoto	1 Michelin star	1 Michelin star	1 Michelin star	1 Michelin star	1 Michelin star	1 Michelin star
Ono	Japanese	Osaka	—	1 Michelin star	1 Michelin star	1 Michelin star	1 Michelin star	1 Michelin star
Onohoué	French	Osaka	1 Michelin star	—	—	—	—	—
Origin	French	Osaka	—	—	1 Michelin star	1 Michelin star	1 Michelin star	Closed
Oryori Hiwatashi	Japanese	Kyoto	1 Michelin star	1 Michelin star	1 Michelin star	Closed		
Oryori Horikawa	Japanese	Osaka	1 Michelin star	1 Michelin star	1 Michelin star	1 Michelin star	1 Michelin star	1 Michelin star
Oryori Mashita	Japanese	Kyoto	1 Michelin star	1 Michelin star	1 Michelin star	1 Michelin star	1 Michelin star	1 Michelin star
Oryori Mitsuyasu	Japanese	Kyoto	2 Michelin stars	2 Michelin stars	2 Michelin stars	1 Michelin star	1 Michelin star	—
Oryori Yamada	Japanese	Osaka	—	1 Michelin star	1 Michelin star	1 Michelin star	1 Michelin star	1 Michelin star
Oshikoji Okada	Japanese	Kyoto	1 Michelin star	1 Michelin star	—	—	—	—
Otagi	Japanese	Kyoto	2 Michelin stars	2 Michelin stars	2 Michelin stars	2 Michelin stars	2 Michelin stars	2 Michelin stars
P Greco	Italian	Osaka	1 Michelin star	1 Michelin star	1 Michelin star	1 Michelin star	1 Michelin star	1 Michelin star
Pierre	French	Osaka	1 Michelin star	1 Michelin star	1 Michelin star	1 Michelin star	1 Michelin star	1 Michelin star
Point	French	Osaka	—	1 Michelin star	1 Michelin star	1 Michelin star	1 Michelin star	1 Michelin star
Presqu'ile	French	Osaka	—	—	1 Michelin star	1 Michelin star	1 Michelin star	1 Michelin star
Rakushin	Japanese	Osaka	1 Michelin star	1 Michelin star	1 Michelin star	1 Michelin star	1 Michelin star	1 Michelin star
Reine des Pres	French	Kyoto	1 Michelin star	1 Michelin star	1 Michelin star	1 Michelin star	1 Michelin star	—
Rooots Nakanoshima	French / Italian	Osaka	—	—	—	—	1 Michelin star	1 Michelin star
Ryō-shō	Japanese	Kyoto	—	—	2 Michelin stars	2 Michelin stars	2 Michelin stars	2 Michelin stars
Ryoriya Inaya	Japanese	Osaka	—	—	—	1 Michelin star	1 Michelin star	1 Michelin star
Ryoriya Maekawa	Japanese	Kyoto	—	1 Michelin star	1 Michelin star	1 Michelin star	1 Michelin star	1 Michelin star
Sakuragawa	Japanese	Kyoto	1 Michelin star	—	—	—	—	—
Sanso Kyoyamato	Japanese	Kyoto	1 Michelin star	1 Michelin star	1 Michelin star	1 Michelin star	2 Michelin stars	2 Michelin stars
Sawada	Japanese	Osaka	1 Michelin star	1 Michelin star	1 Michelin star	1 Michelin star	1 Michelin star	—
SEN	Japanese	Kyoto	1 Michelin star	1 Michelin star	1 Michelin star	1 Michelin star	1 Michelin star	1 Michelin star
Shimmonzen Yonemura	Innovative	Kyoto	2 Michelin stars	2 Michelin stars	2 Michelin stars	2 Michelin stars	1 Michelin star	1 Michelin star
Shimogamo Saryo	Japanese	Kyoto	1 Michelin star	1 Michelin star	1 Michelin star	1 Michelin star	—	—
Shinchi Yamamoto	Japanese	Osaka	1 Michelin star	1 Michelin star	1 Michelin star	1 Michelin star	1 Michelin star	1 Michelin star
Shintaro	Japanese	Osaka	1 Michelin star	1 Michelin star	1 Michelin star	—	—	—
Shiro	Italian	Kyoto	—	—	—	—	1 Michelin star	1 Michelin star
Shoroku	Japanese	Osaka	1 Michelin star	1 Michelin star	1 Michelin star	—	—	—
Shuhaku	Japanese	Kyoto	1 Michelin star	1 Michelin star	1 Michelin star	—	—	—
Shunai Sasaki	Japanese	Kyoto	1 Michelin star	1 Michelin star	—	—	—	—
Shunsaiten Tsuchiya	Japanese	Suita	2 Michelin stars	2 Michelin stars	2 Michelin stars	2 Michelin stars	2 Michelin stars	2 Michelin stars
Shunsenwaraku Sanai	Japanese	Osaka	1 Michelin star	1 Michelin star	1 Michelin star	—	—	—
Sinae	French	Osaka	—	—	—	1 Michelin star	1 Michelin star	1 Michelin star
Soba Takama (Note: Restaurant re-assessed to Bib Gourmand designation as of 2022)	Japanese	Osaka	1 Michelin star	—	—	—	—	—
Sojiki Nakahigashi	Japanese	Kyoto	2 Michelin stars	2 Michelin stars	2 Michelin stars	2 Michelin stars	2 Michelin stars	2 Michelin stars
Sokkon Fujimoto	Japanese	Kyoto	1 Michelin star	1 Michelin star	—	—	—	1 Michelin star
Sosakuwasho Nakashima	Japanese	Osaka	1 Michelin star	1 Michelin star	Closed			
Sui Oya (Note: Was named Sui until 2023)	Japanese	Osaka	1 Michelin star	1 Michelin star	1 Michelin star	1 Michelin star	1 Michelin star	1 Michelin star
Sumibi Kappo Ifuki (Note: Also known simply as Ifuki)	Japanese	Kyoto	2 Michelin stars	2 Michelin stars	2 Michelin stars	2 Michelin stars	2 Michelin stars	2 Michelin stars
Sumibi Kappo Ishii	Japanese	Osaka	1 Michelin star	1 Michelin star	1 Michelin star	1 Michelin star	—	Closed
Sushi Harasho	Japanese	Osaka	2 Michelin stars	2 Michelin stars	2 Michelin stars	2 Michelin stars	2 Michelin stars	2 Michelin stars
Sushi Hayashi	Japanese	Kyoto	1 Michelin star	1 Michelin star	1 Michelin star	1 Michelin star	—	—
Sushi Hoshiyama	Japanese	Osaka	1 Michelin star	1 Michelin star	1 Michelin star	1 Michelin star	1 Michelin star	1 Michelin star
Sushi Kappo Nakaichi	Japanese	Kyoto	1 Michelin star	1 Michelin star	1 Michelin star	1 Michelin star	1 Michelin star	1 Michelin star
Sushi Matsumoto	Japanese	Kyoto	1 Michelin star	1 Michelin star	1 Michelin star	1 Michelin star	1 Michelin star	1 Michelin star
Sushi Minazuki	Japanese	Osaka	1 Michelin star	1 Michelin star	1 Michelin star	—	—	—
Sushi Murakami Jiro	Japanese	Osaka	1 Michelin star	1 Michelin star	1 Michelin star	1 Michelin star	1 Michelin star	1 Michelin star
Sushi Ohata	Japanese	Osaka	1 Michelin star	1 Michelin star	1 Michelin star	—	—	—
Sushi Rakumi	Japanese	Kyoto	1 Michelin star	1 Michelin star	1 Michelin star	1 Michelin star	1 Michelin star	1 Michelin star
Sushi Sanshin	Japanese	Osaka	—	—	1 Michelin star	1 Michelin star	1 Michelin star	1 Michelin star
Sushi Shigenaga	Japanese	Osaka	—	—	—	—	—	1 Michelin star
Sushi Wakon	Japanese	Kyoto	1 Michelin star	Closed				
Sushi Yuden	Japanese	Osaka	1 Michelin star	1 Michelin star	1 Michelin star	1 Michelin star	—	—
Sushidokoro Amano	Japanese	Osaka	1 Michelin star	1 Michelin star	1 Michelin star	1 Michelin star	1 Michelin star	1 Michelin star
Sushidokoro Hirokawa	Japanese	Osaka	1 Michelin star	1 Michelin star	—	—	—	—
Sushiroku	Japanese	Osaka	1 Michelin star	1 Michelin star	1 Michelin star	1 Michelin star	—	—
Sushiyoshi	Japanese	Osaka	2 Michelin stars	2 Michelin stars	2 Michelin stars	—	—	—
Taian	Japanese	Osaka	3 Michelin stars	3 Michelin stars	3 Michelin stars	3 Michelin stars	3 Michelin stars	3 Michelin stars
Takayama	Japanese	Kyoto	1 Michelin star	1 Michelin star	1 Michelin star	1 Michelin star	1 Michelin star	1 Michelin star
Takoyasu	Seafood	Osaka	1 Michelin star	1 Michelin star	1 Michelin star	1 Michelin star	—	—
Tempura Hanagatami	Japanese	Osaka	1 Michelin star	1 Michelin star	1 Michelin star	—	—	—
Tempura Mizuki	Japanese	Kyoto	1 Michelin star	1 Michelin star	1 Michelin star	—	—	—
Ten-You	Japanese	Kyoto	1 Michelin star	1 Michelin star	—	—	—	—
Tenjaku	Japanese	Kyoto	—	—	—	1 Michelin star	1 Michelin star	1 Michelin star
Tenjimbashi Aoki (Note: Was named Aoki until 2021)	Japanese	Osaka	2 Michelin stars	2 Michelin stars	2 Michelin stars	2 Michelin stars	2 Michelin stars	2 Michelin stars
Tenmabashi Fujikawa	Japanese	Osaka	1 Michelin star	1 Michelin star	1 Michelin star	—	—	—
Terada	Japanese	Osaka	1 Michelin star	1 Michelin star	1 Michelin star	1 Michelin star	1 Michelin star	1 Michelin star
Teruya	Japanese	Osaka	1 Michelin star	1 Michelin star	1 Michelin star	1 Michelin star	1 Michelin star	2 Michelin stars
Tokuha Motonari	Japanese	Kyoto	—	—	—	1 Michelin star	1 Michelin star	2 Michelin stars
Tominokoji Yamagishi	Japanese	Kyoto	1 Michelin star	1 Michelin star	—	—	—	—
Torisaki	Japanese	Kyoto	1 Michelin star	1 Michelin star	1 Michelin star	1 Michelin star	1 Michelin star	1 Michelin star
Torisho Ishii	Japanese	Osaka	1 Michelin star	1 Michelin star	1 Michelin star	1 Michelin star	1 Michelin star	1 Michelin star
Tosara	Italian	Osaka	—	—	—	—	—	1 Michelin star
Tozentei	Japanese	Kyoto	1 Michelin star	1 Michelin star	1 Michelin star	1 Michelin star	1 Michelin star	1 Michelin star
Tsujifusa	Japanese	Kyoto	—	—	—	—	1 Michelin star	1 Michelin star
Ukitacho Ima	Japanese	Osaka	—	—	—	—	—	1 Michelin star
Unkaku	Japanese	Osaka	1 Michelin star	1 Michelin star	1 Michelin star	—	—	—
Uozuya	Japanese	Kyoto	1 Michelin star	1 Michelin star	1 Michelin star	1 Michelin star	1 Michelin star	1 Michelin star
Utsubohonmachi Gaku	Japanese	Osaka	1 Michelin star	1 Michelin star	1 Michelin star	1 Michelin star	—	—
Velrosier	Chinese	Kyoto	1 Michelin star	1 Michelin star	2 Michelin stars	2 Michelin stars	1 Michelin star	1 Michelin star
Vena	Italian	Kyoto	1 Michelin star	1 Michelin star	1 Michelin star	1 Michelin star	1 Michelin star	1 Michelin star
Wagen	Japanese	Osaka	1 Michelin star	—	—	—	—	—
Wagokoro Izumi	Japanese	Kyoto	2 Michelin stars	2 Michelin stars	2 Michelin stars	2 Michelin stars	1 Michelin star	1 Michelin star
Yakitori Ichimatsu	Japanese	Osaka	1 Michelin star	1 Michelin star	1 Michelin star	1 Michelin star	1 Michelin star	1 Michelin star
Yakitori Torisen	Japanese	Osaka	—	—	1 Michelin star	1 Michelin star	1 Michelin star	1 Michelin star
Yokoi	Japanese	Kyoto	—	—	—	—	—	1 Michelin star
Yonemasu	Japanese	Osaka	1 Michelin star	1 Michelin star	1 Michelin star	1 Michelin star	1 Michelin star	1 Michelin star
Yoshiko	Seafood	Osaka	1 Michelin star	1 Michelin star	1 Michelin star	1 Michelin star	1 Michelin star	1 Michelin star
Yoshino	Japanese	Osaka	1 Michelin star	1 Michelin star	1 Michelin star	Closed		
Yugen	Japanese	Osaka	1 Michelin star	1 Michelin star	1 Michelin star	2 Michelin stars	2 Michelin stars	2 Michelin stars
YUNiCO	Italian	Osaka	—	1 Michelin star	1 Michelin star	1 Michelin star	1 Michelin star	1 Michelin star
Yuno	Japanese	Osaka	1 Michelin star	—	—	—	—	—
Yusokuryori Mankamero	Japanese	Kyoto	2 Michelin stars	2 Michelin stars	2 Michelin stars	2 Michelin stars	2 Michelin stars	2 Michelin stars
Yuyu	Japanese	Kyoto	1 Michelin star	1 Michelin star	1 Michelin star	1 Michelin star	—	—
Zeshin	Japanese	Osaka	1 Michelin star	1 Michelin star	1 Michelin star	1 Michelin star	1 Michelin star	1 Michelin star
Reference(s)								

==== 2017–2020 ====
Michelin-starred restaurants
Name	Cuisine	Location	2017	2018	2019	2020
Ajikitcho Horieten	Japanese	Osaka	2 Michelin stars	2 Michelin stars	2 Michelin stars	1 Michelin star
Aoki	Japanese	Osaka	2 Michelin stars	2 Michelin stars	2 Michelin stars	2 Michelin stars
Bini	Italian	Kyoto	—	—	—	1 Michelin star
Chi-Fu	Chinese	Osaka	—	—	—	1 Michelin star
Chihana	Japanese	Kyoto	3 Michelin stars	3 Michelin stars	—	—
Chihiro	Japanese	Kyoto	2 Michelin stars	2 Michelin stars	2 Michelin stars	2 Michelin stars
Fujiya 1935	Japanese	Osaka	2 Michelin stars	2 Michelin stars	2 Michelin stars	2 Michelin stars
Fukiage	Japanese	Kyoto	2 Michelin stars	2 Michelin stars	2 Michelin stars	2 Michelin stars
Gion Maruyama	Japanese	Kyoto	2 Michelin stars	2 Michelin stars	2 Michelin stars	2 Michelin stars
Gion Matayoschi	Japanese	Kyoto	2 Michelin stars	2 Michelin stars	2 Michelin stars	2 Michelin stars
Gion Nishikawa	Japanese	Kyoto	2 Michelin stars	2 Michelin stars	2 Michelin stars	2 Michelin stars
Gion Owatari	Japanese	Kyoto	2 Michelin stars	2 Michelin stars	2 Michelin stars	2 Michelin stars
Gion Sasaki	Japanese	Kyoto	2 Michelin stars	2 Michelin stars	2 Michelin stars	3 Michelin stars
Hajime	Innovative	Osaka	2 Michelin stars	3 Michelin stars	3 Michelin stars	3 Michelin stars
Hamasaku	Japanese	Kyoto	2 Michelin stars	2 Michelin stars	—	—
Hassun	Japanese	Kyoto	2 Michelin stars	2 Michelin stars	2 Michelin stars	2 Michelin stars
Hatsu		Osaka	—	—	—	1 Michelin star
Higashiyama Yoshihisa	Japanese	Kyoto	—	—	—	1 Michelin star
Honkogetsu	Japanese	Osaka	2 Michelin stars	2 Michelin stars	2 Michelin stars	2 Michelin stars
Houba	Korean	Osaka	2 Michelin stars	2 Michelin stars	2 Michelin stars	2 Michelin stars
Hyotei	Japanese	Kyoto	3 Michelin stars	3 Michelin stars	3 Michelin stars	3 Michelin stars
Ichiju Nisai Ueno Mino	Japanese	Minōh	2 Michelin stars	2 Michelin stars	2 Michelin stars	2 Michelin stars
Ifuki	Japanese	Kyoto	2 Michelin stars	2 Michelin stars	2 Michelin stars	2 Michelin stars
Iida (Note: Restaurant lost its stars in 2021 following restricting its booking access for the general public)	Japanese	Kyoto	2 Michelin stars	3 Michelin stars	3 Michelin stars	3 Michelin stars
Il Centrino	Italian	Osaka	—	—	—	1 Michelin star
Isshin	Japanese	Kyoto	2 Michelin stars	2 Michelin stars	2 Michelin stars	—
Isshisoden Nakamura	Japanese	Kyoto	3 Michelin stars	3 Michelin stars	3 Michelin stars	3 Michelin stars
Ito	French / Japanese	Kyoto	—	—	—	1 Michelin star
Kahala	Innovative	Osaka	2 Michelin stars	2 Michelin stars	2 Michelin stars	2 Michelin stars
Kamanza Nagashima	Japanese	Kyoto	—	—	—	1 Michelin star
Kashiwaya Osaka Senriyama	Japanese	Osaka	3 Michelin stars	3 Michelin stars	3 Michelin stars	3 Michelin stars
Kasho	Japanese	Kaizuka	2 Michelin stars	2 Michelin stars	2 Michelin stars	2 Michelin stars
Kenninji Gion Maruyama	Japanese	Kyoto	2 Michelin stars	2 Michelin stars	2 Michelin stars	2 Michelin stars
Kikunoi Honten	Japanese	Kyoto	3 Michelin stars	3 Michelin stars	3 Michelin stars	3 Michelin stars
Kikunoi Roan	Japanese	Kyoto	2 Michelin stars	2 Michelin stars	2 Michelin stars	2 Michelin stars
Kitahachi	Seafood	Kishiwada	2 Michelin stars	2 Michelin stars	2 Michelin stars	2 Michelin stars
Koryu	Japanese	Osaka	3 Michelin stars	3 Michelin stars	3 Michelin stars	2 Michelin stars
Kyokaiseki Kichisen	Japanese	Kyoto	3 Michelin stars	3 Michelin stars	3 Michelin stars	2 Michelin stars
Kyoryori Fujimoto	Japanese	Kyoto	—	—	—	1 Michelin star
Kyotenjin Noguchi	Japanese	Kyoto	2 Michelin stars	2 Michelin stars	2 Michelin stars	2 Michelin stars
Kyoto Kiccho Arashiyama (Note: Also known as Kitcho Arashiyama Honten)	Japanese	Kyoto	3 Michelin stars	3 Michelin stars	3 Michelin stars	3 Michelin stars
La Cime	French	Osaka	2 Michelin stars	2 Michelin stars	2 Michelin stars	2 Michelin stars
Maeda	Japanese	Kyoto	2 Michelin stars	2 Michelin stars	2 Michelin stars	3 Michelin stars
Masuda	Japanese	Osaka	2 Michelin stars	2 Michelin stars	2 Michelin stars	2 Michelin stars
Mita	Japanese	Kyoto	2 Michelin stars	2 Michelin stars	2 Michelin stars	—
Miyamaso (Note: Also known simply as Miyama-so)	Japanese	Kyoto	2 Michelin stars	2 Michelin stars	2 Michelin stars	2 Michelin stars
Miyamoto	Japanese	Osaka	2 Michelin stars	2 Michelin stars	2 Michelin stars	2 Michelin stars
Mizai	Japanese	Kyoto	3 Michelin stars	3 Michelin stars	3 Michelin stars	3 Michelin stars
Nishino	Japanese	Osaka	—	—	—	1 Michelin star
Ogata	Japanese	Kyoto	2 Michelin stars	2 Michelin stars	2 Michelin stars	2 Michelin stars
Oryori Horikawa	Japanese	Osaka	—	—	—	1 Michelin star
Oryori Mitsuyasu (Note: Also known simply as Mitsuyasu)	Japanese	Kyoto	2 Michelin stars	2 Michelin stars	2 Michelin stars	2 Michelin stars
Oshikoji Okada	Japanese	Kyoto	—	—	—	1 Michelin star
Otagi	Japanese	Kyoto				2 Michelin stars
Point	French	Osaka	2 Michelin stars	—	—	—
Ryozanpaku	Japanese	Kyoto	2 Michelin stars	1 Michelin star	—	—
Sakurae	Japanese	Toyonaka	2 Michelin stars	2 Michelin stars	—	—
Shimmonzen Yonemura	Innovative	Kyoto			1 Michelin star	2 Michelin stars
Shoroku	Japanese	Osaka	—	—	—	1 Michelin star
Shunsaiten Tsuchiya (Note: Was named Tsuchiya until 2017)	Japanese	Osaka	2 Michelin stars	2 Michelin stars	2 Michelin stars	2 Michelin stars
Shunseki Suzue	Japanese	Kyoto	2 Michelin stars	2 Michelin stars	2 Michelin stars	2 Michelin stars
Sojiki Nakahigashi	Japanese	Kyoto	2 Michelin stars	2 Michelin stars	2 Michelin stars	2 Michelin stars
Sushi Harasho (Note: Was named Harasho until 2017)	Japanese	Osaka	2 Michelin stars	2 Michelin stars	2 Michelin stars	2 Michelin stars
Sushi Murakami Jiro	Japanese	Osaka	—	—	—	1 Michelin star
Sushi Ohata	Japanese	Osaka	—	—	—	1 Michelin star
Sushi Rakumi	Japanese	Kyoto	—	—	—	1 Michelin star
Sushiyoshi	Japanese	Osaka	2 Michelin stars	2 Michelin stars	2 Michelin stars	2 Michelin stars
Taian	Japanese	Osaka	3 Michelin stars	3 Michelin stars	3 Michelin stars	3 Michelin stars
Takoyasu	Seafood	Osaka	2 Michelin stars	2 Michelin stars	2 Michelin stars	2 Michelin stars
Tempura Hanagatami	Japanese	Osaka	—	—	—	1 Michelin star
Teruya	Japanese	Osaka	—	—	—	1 Michelin star
Vena	Italian	Kyoto	—	—	—	1 Michelin star
Wagokoro Izumi	Japanese	Kyoto	2 Michelin stars	2 Michelin stars	2 Michelin stars	2 Michelin stars
Wakuden (Kodaiji)	Japanese	Kyoto	2 Michelin stars	2 Michelin stars	2 Michelin stars	2 Michelin stars
Yotaro Honten	Japanese	Osaka	2 Michelin stars	1 Michelin star	1 Michelin star	—
Yusokuryori Mankamero (Note: Also known simply as Mankamero)	Japanese	Kyoto	2 Michelin stars	2 Michelin stars	2 Michelin stars	2 Michelin stars
Reference(s)						

=== Kyoto, Osaka, Kobe, and Nara (2010–2016) ===
Key
1 Michelin star	One Michelin star
2 Michelin stars	Two Michelin stars
3 Michelin stars	Three Michelin stars
—	The restaurant did not receive a star that year
Closed	The restaurant is no longer open

Michelin-starred restaurants
Name	Cuisine	Location	2010	2011	2012	2013	2014	2015	2016
Ajikitcho Horieten	Japanese	Osaka		2 Michelin stars	2 Michelin stars	2 Michelin stars	2 Michelin stars	2 Michelin stars	2 Michelin stars
Akai	Japanese	Kyoto					2 Michelin stars	2 Michelin stars	1 Michelin star
Amefu	Japanese	Ashiya	—	2 Michelin stars	2 Michelin stars	2 Michelin stars	2 Michelin stars	2 Michelin stars	2 Michelin stars
Ankyu	Japanese	Kyoto			2 Michelin stars	2 Michelin stars	2 Michelin stars	2 Michelin stars	—
Aoki	Japanese	Osaka						2 Michelin stars	2 Michelin stars
Aragawa	Steakhouse	Kobe	—	2 Michelin stars	2 Michelin stars	2 Michelin stars	2 Michelin stars	2 Michelin stars	2 Michelin stars
Ca Cento/Sento	Innovative	Kobe	—	3 Michelin stars	3 Michelin stars	3 Michelin stars	3 Michelin stars	3 Michelin stars	3 Michelin stars
Chihana	Japanese	Kyoto	3 Michelin stars	3 Michelin stars	3 Michelin stars	3 Michelin stars	3 Michelin stars	3 Michelin stars	3 Michelin stars
Chihiro	Japanese	Kyoto		2 Michelin stars	2 Michelin stars	2 Michelin stars	2 Michelin stars	2 Michelin stars	2 Michelin stars
Fujiya 1935	Japanese	Osaka	2 Michelin stars	2 Michelin stars	3 Michelin stars	3 Michelin stars	3 Michelin stars	3 Michelin stars	3 Michelin stars
Fukiage	Japanese	Kyoto			2 Michelin stars	2 Michelin stars	2 Michelin stars	2 Michelin stars	2 Michelin stars
Gensai	Japanese	Kobe	—	2 Michelin stars	2 Michelin stars	2 Michelin stars	2 Michelin stars	2 Michelin stars	2 Michelin stars
Gion Maruyama	Japanese	Kyoto	2 Michelin stars	2 Michelin stars	2 Michelin stars	2 Michelin stars	2 Michelin stars	2 Michelin stars	2 Michelin stars
Gion Matayoshi	Japanese	Kyoto			2 Michelin stars	2 Michelin stars	—	—	2 Michelin stars
Gion Matsumuro	Japanese	Kyoto		2 Michelin stars	2 Michelin stars	—	—	—	—
Gion Nishikawa	Japanese	Kyoto			2 Michelin stars	2 Michelin stars	2 Michelin stars	2 Michelin stars	2 Michelin stars
Gion Owatari	Japanese	Kyoto							2 Michelin stars
Gion Sasaki	Japanese	Kyoto	2 Michelin stars	2 Michelin stars	2 Michelin stars	2 Michelin stars	2 Michelin stars	2 Michelin stars	2 Michelin stars
Gion Suetomo	Japanese	Kyoto		2 Michelin stars	2 Michelin stars	1 Michelin star	1 Michelin star	1 Michelin star	1 Michelin star
Gyuho	Japanese	Osaka		2 Michelin stars	2 Michelin stars	—	—	—	—
Hajime	Innovative	Osaka	3 Michelin stars	3 Michelin stars	3 Michelin stars	2 Michelin stars	2 Michelin stars	2 Michelin stars	2 Michelin stars
Hamasaku	Japanese	Kyoto			2 Michelin stars	1 Michelin star	1 Michelin star	1 Michelin star	2 Michelin stars
Hanagaki	Japanese	Nara	—	—	2 Michelin stars	2 Michelin stars	2 Michelin stars	2 Michelin stars	2 Michelin stars
Hanamura	Japanese	Kyoto		2 Michelin stars	2 Michelin stars	1 Michelin star	1 Michelin star	—	—
Hassun	Japanese	Kyoto		2 Michelin stars	2 Michelin stars	2 Michelin stars	2 Michelin stars	2 Michelin stars	2 Michelin stars
Hatada	Japanese	Nishinomiya	—	1 Michelin star	2 Michelin stars	2 Michelin stars	2 Michelin stars	2 Michelin stars	2 Michelin stars
Honke Tankuma Honten (Note: Was named Tankuma Honke until 2012)	Japanese	Kyoto	2 Michelin stars	2 Michelin stars	2 Michelin stars	2 Michelin stars	2 Michelin stars	1 Michelin star	1 Michelin star
Honkogetsu	Japanese	Osaka	2 Michelin stars	2 Michelin stars	2 Michelin stars	2 Michelin stars	2 Michelin stars	2 Michelin stars	2 Michelin stars
Houba	Korean	Osaka							2 Michelin stars
Hyakumidokoro Onjiki	Japanese	Kobe	—	2 Michelin stars	2 Michelin stars	2 Michelin stars	2 Michelin stars	2 Michelin stars	2 Michelin stars
Hyotei	Japanese	Kyoto	3 Michelin stars	3 Michelin stars	3 Michelin stars	3 Michelin stars	3 Michelin stars	3 Michelin stars	3 Michelin stars
Ichiju Nisai Ueno Mino	Japanese	Minōh			2 Michelin stars	2 Michelin stars	2 Michelin stars	2 Michelin stars	2 Michelin stars
Iida	Japanese	Kyoto					1 Michelin star	2 Michelin stars	2 Michelin stars
Isshin	Japanese	Kyoto		2 Michelin stars	2 Michelin stars	2 Michelin stars	2 Michelin stars	2 Michelin stars	2 Michelin stars
Isshisoden Nakamura	Japanese	Kyoto	2 Michelin stars	3 Michelin stars	3 Michelin stars	3 Michelin stars	3 Michelin stars	3 Michelin stars	3 Michelin stars
Jikishin	Japanese	Nishinomiya	—	2 Michelin stars	2 Michelin stars	2 Michelin stars	2 Michelin stars	2 Michelin stars	2 Michelin stars
Kahala	Innovative	Osaka	2 Michelin stars	2 Michelin stars	2 Michelin stars	2 Michelin stars	2 Michelin stars	2 Michelin stars	2 Michelin stars
Kanamean Nishitomiya	Japanese	Kyoto	2 Michelin stars	2 Michelin stars	2 Michelin stars	1 Michelin star	1 Michelin star	1 Michelin star	1 Michelin star
Kashiwaya Osaka Senriyama	Japanese	Osaka	2 Michelin stars	3 Michelin stars	3 Michelin stars	3 Michelin stars	3 Michelin stars	3 Michelin stars	3 Michelin stars
Kasho	Japanese	Osaka	2 Michelin stars	2 Michelin stars	2 Michelin stars	2 Michelin stars	2 Michelin stars	2 Michelin stars	2 Michelin stars
Kenninji Gion Maruyama	Japanese	Kyoto	2 Michelin stars	2 Michelin stars	2 Michelin stars	2 Michelin stars	2 Michelin stars	2 Michelin stars	2 Michelin stars
Kikunoi Honten	Japanese	Kyoto	3 Michelin stars	3 Michelin stars	3 Michelin stars	3 Michelin stars	3 Michelin stars	3 Michelin stars	3 Michelin stars
Kikunoi Roan	Japanese	Kyoto	2 Michelin stars	2 Michelin stars	2 Michelin stars	2 Michelin stars	2 Michelin stars	2 Michelin stars	2 Michelin stars
Kimoto	Japanese	Kobe	—	—	2 Michelin stars	2 Michelin stars	2 Michelin stars	2 Michelin stars	—
Kitahachi	Japanese	Kishiwada			2 Michelin stars	2 Michelin stars	2 Michelin stars	2 Michelin stars	2 Michelin stars
Komago	Japanese	Kobe	—	3 Michelin stars	3 Michelin stars	3 Michelin stars	3 Michelin stars	3 Michelin stars	3 Michelin stars
Koryu	Japanese	Osaka	2 Michelin stars	2 Michelin stars	3 Michelin stars	3 Michelin stars	3 Michelin stars	3 Michelin stars	3 Michelin stars
Kyoboshi	Japanese	Kyoto			2 Michelin stars	2 Michelin stars	1 Michelin star	1 Michelin star	1 Michelin star
Kyokaiseki Kichisen (Note: Was named Kichisen until 2013)	Japanese	Kyoto	2 Michelin stars	2 Michelin stars	2 Michelin stars	2 Michelin stars	3 Michelin stars	3 Michelin stars	3 Michelin stars
Kyoto Kiccho Arashiyama (Note: Also known as Kitcho Arashiyama Honten)	Japanese	Kyoto	3 Michelin stars	3 Michelin stars	3 Michelin stars	3 Michelin stars	3 Michelin stars	3 Michelin stars	3 Michelin stars
La Cime	French	Osaka							2 Michelin stars
Le Pont de Ciel	French	Osaka	2 Michelin stars	1 Michelin star	1 Michelin star	1 Michelin star	1 Michelin star	1 Michelin star	1 Michelin star
Maeda	Japanese	Kyoto	—	—	—	—	1 Michelin star	1 Michelin star	2 Michelin stars
Mankamero	Japanese	Kyoto		2 Michelin stars	2 Michelin stars	2 Michelin stars	2 Michelin stars	2 Michelin stars	2 Michelin stars
Masuda	Japanese	Osaka		2 Michelin stars	2 Michelin stars	2 Michelin stars	2 Michelin stars	2 Michelin stars	2 Michelin stars
Mita	Japanese	Kyoto						2 Michelin stars	1 Michelin star
Mitsuyasu	Japanese	Kyoto			2 Michelin stars	2 Michelin stars	—	2 Michelin stars	2 Michelin stars
Miyama-so	Japanese	Kyoto		2 Michelin stars	2 Michelin stars	2 Michelin stars	2 Michelin stars	2 Michelin stars	2 Michelin stars
Miyamoto	Japanese	Osaka					2 Michelin stars	2 Michelin stars	2 Michelin stars
Mizai	Japanese	Kyoto	3 Michelin stars	3 Michelin stars	3 Michelin stars	Closed	3 Michelin stars	3 Michelin stars	3 Michelin stars
Momen	Japanese	Osaka	2 Michelin stars	—	—	—	—	—	—
Musoan	Japanese	Nara	—	—	2 Michelin stars	2 Michelin stars	2 Michelin stars	2 Michelin stars	2 Michelin stars
Ogata	Japanese	Kyoto	2 Michelin stars	2 Michelin stars	2 Michelin stars	2 Michelin stars	2 Michelin stars	2 Michelin stars	2 Michelin stars
Onjaku	Japanese	Nara	—	—	2 Michelin stars	2 Michelin stars	2 Michelin stars	2 Michelin stars	2 Michelin stars
Point (Note: Was named Accueillir until 2012)	French	Osaka	2 Michelin stars	2 Michelin stars	2 Michelin stars	Closed	2 Michelin stars	2 Michelin stars	2 Michelin stars
Ryozanpaku	Japanese	Kyoto	2 Michelin stars	2 Michelin stars	2 Michelin stars	2 Michelin stars	2 Michelin stars	2 Michelin stars	2 Michelin stars
Sakurada	Japanese	Kyoto	2 Michelin stars	2 Michelin stars	2 Michelin stars	1 Michelin star	1 Michelin star	—	—
Sakurae Toyonaka	Japanese	Toyonaka			2 Michelin stars	2 Michelin stars	2 Michelin stars	2 Michelin stars	2 Michelin stars
Sankayo	Japanese	Kobe	—	2 Michelin stars	2 Michelin stars	1 Michelin star	1 Michelin star	1 Michelin star	1 Michelin star
Shunsaiten Tsuchiya	Japanese	Suita			2 Michelin stars	2 Michelin stars	2 Michelin stars	2 Michelin stars	2 Michelin stars
Shunseki Suzue	Japanese	Kyoto		2 Michelin stars	2 Michelin stars	2 Michelin stars	2 Michelin stars	2 Michelin stars	2 Michelin stars
Sojiki Nakahigashi (Note: Was named Nakahigashi (Sojiki) until 2013)	Japanese	Kyoto		2 Michelin stars	2 Michelin stars	2 Michelin stars	2 Michelin stars	2 Michelin stars	2 Michelin stars
Sottaku Tsukamoto	Japanese	Kyoto		2 Michelin stars	2 Michelin stars	2 Michelin stars	2 Michelin stars	2 Michelin stars	2 Michelin stars
Sushi Harasho	Japanese	Osaka	2 Michelin stars	2 Michelin stars	2 Michelin stars	2 Michelin stars	2 Michelin stars	2 Michelin stars	2 Michelin stars
Sushi Kissui	Japanese	Kobe	—	2 Michelin stars	2 Michelin stars	2 Michelin stars	2 Michelin stars	2 Michelin stars	2 Michelin stars
Sushi Matsumoto Kyoto	Japanese	Kyoto	2 Michelin stars	2 Michelin stars	2 Michelin stars	1 Michelin star	1 Michelin star	1 Michelin star	1 Michelin star
Sushi Matsumoto Nishinomiya	Japanese	Nishinomiya	—	2 Michelin stars	2 Michelin stars	1 Michelin star	1 Michelin star	1 Michelin star	1 Michelin star
Sushiyoshi	Japanese	Osaka							2 Michelin stars
Taian	Japanese	Osaka	2 Michelin stars	3 Michelin stars	3 Michelin stars	3 Michelin stars	3 Michelin stars	3 Michelin stars	3 Michelin stars
Takagi	Japanese	Ashiya	—	2 Michelin stars	2 Michelin stars	2 Michelin stars	2 Michelin stars	2 Michelin stars	2 Michelin stars
Takoyasu	Seafood	Osaka			2 Michelin stars	2 Michelin stars	2 Michelin stars	2 Michelin stars	2 Michelin stars
Totoya	Japanese	Osaka	2 Michelin stars	2 Michelin stars	2 Michelin stars	2 Michelin stars	2 Michelin stars	2 Michelin stars	2 Michelin stars
Tsuruya (Note: Restaurant lost its star in 2017)	Japanese	Kyoto	3 Michelin stars	3 Michelin stars	3 Michelin stars	2 Michelin stars	2 Michelin stars	2 Michelin stars	1 Michelin star
Uemura	Japanese	Kobe	—			1 Michelin star	2 Michelin stars	2 Michelin stars	2 Michelin stars
Uosaburo	Japanese	Kyoto	2 Michelin stars	2 Michelin stars	1 Michelin star	1 Michelin star	1 Michelin star	1 Michelin star	1 Michelin star
Wa Yamamura	Japanese	Nara	—	—	3 Michelin stars	3 Michelin stars	3 Michelin stars	3 Michelin stars	3 Michelin stars
Wagokoro Izumi	Japanese	Kyoto			2 Michelin stars	2 Michelin stars	2 Michelin stars	2 Michelin stars	2 Michelin stars
Wakuden (Kodaiji)	Japanese	Kyoto		2 Michelin stars	2 Michelin stars	2 Michelin stars	2 Michelin stars	2 Michelin stars	2 Michelin stars
Yamanaka	Japanese	Kobe	—	2 Michelin stars	2 Michelin stars	2 Michelin stars	2 Michelin stars	2 Michelin stars	2 Michelin stars
Yotaro Honten	Japanese	Osaka		2 Michelin stars	2 Michelin stars	2 Michelin stars	2 Michelin stars	2 Michelin stars	2 Michelin stars
Reference(s)									

== See also ==
- List of Michelin-starred restaurants in Japan
- List of Michelin-starred restaurants in Hokkaido
- List of Michelin-starred restaurants in Nara
- List of Michelin-starred restaurants in Tokyo
- Lists of restaurants

== Bibliography ==
- Michelin Guide Kyoto Osaka 2010. Michelin Travel & Lifestyle. 2010. ISBN 978-2-06-714711-9.
- Michelin Guide Kyoto Osaka Kobe 2011. Michelin Travel & Lifestyle. 2011. ISBN 978-2-06-715355-4.
- Michelin Guide Kyoto Osaka Kobe Nara 2012. Michelin Travel & Lifestyle. 2012. ISBN 978-2-06-716948-7.
- Michelin Guide Kyoto Osaka Kobe Nara 2013. Michelin Travel & Lifestyle. 2013. ISBN 978-2-06-717983-7.
- Michelin Guide Kyoto Osaka 2016. Michelin Travel & Lifestyle. 2016. ISBN 978-4904337080.
- Michelin Guide Kyoto Osaka 2017. Michelin Travel & Lifestyle. 2017. ISBN 978-4904337110.
- Michelin Guide Kyoto Osaka 2021. Michelin Travel & Lifestyle. 2021. ISBN 978-4904337295.
- Michelin Guide Kyoto Osaka 2023. Michelin Travel & Lifestyle. 2023. ISBN 978-4904337349.
- Michelin Guide Kyoto Osaka 2025. Michelin Travel & Lifestyle. 2025. ISBN 978-4904337431.
