= Kitahama =

Kitahama may refer to:

- Kitahama Station (disambiguation), multiple railway station in Japan
- The Kitahama, a residential building in Chuo-ku, Osaka, Japan

== People with the surname ==
- Kensuke Kitahama (北浜 健介, born 1975), Japanese shogi player
