= Kitcho =

Japanese restaurant chain

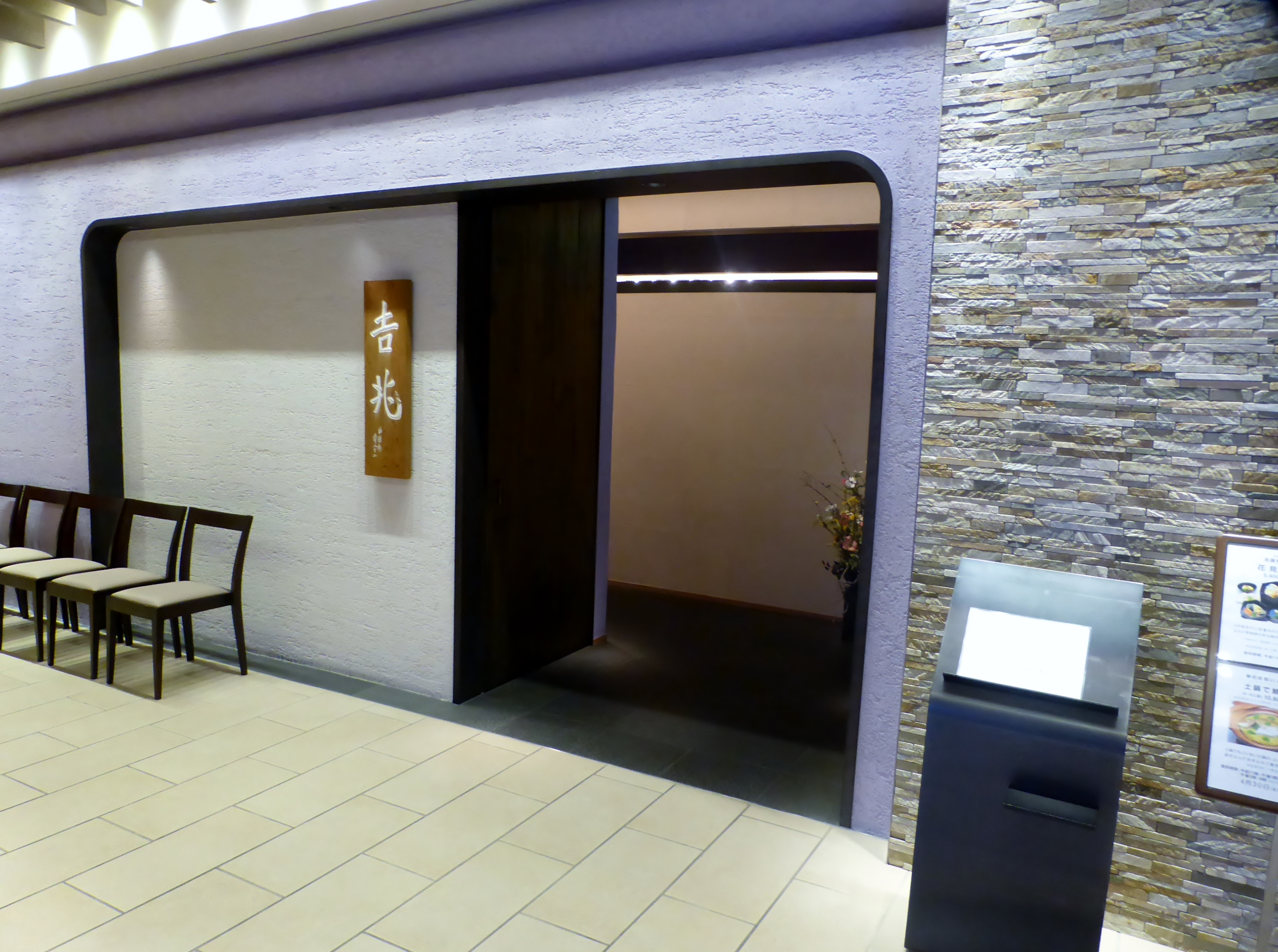
Kiccho in 2014

Kitcho (Kanji: 吉兆 Hiragana: きっちょう lit. "good omen") is a kaiseki (Japanese haute cuisine) restaurant chain group and one of the most famous ones in Japan. It was founded by Teiichi Yuki in 1930 in Osaka, and today runs restaurants in Osaka, Kyoto, Kobe, Fukuoka and Tokyo.

Today the Kitcho group consists of five companies, whose headquarters are located in Osaka, Kobe, Kyoto and Tokyo respectively. Among the restaurants they run, the ones in Koraibashi (Osaka), Arashiyama (Kyoto) and Ginza (Tokyo) are especially well known.

Many politicians, businesspeople and artists are known as frequent customers. As a kaiseki restaurant, catering for the Japanese tea ceremony is one of its major services. A lunch in the Koraibashi restaurant costs over US$300, and dinner costs over US$400 per person.

== History ==
The founder Teiichi Yuki was also known as an expert in the Japanese tea ceremony and a great collector of tea utensils, not only dishes for Kaiseki cuisine. He wrote many books about cuisine and tea ceremony. The current executive chef of Kyoto Arashiyama Kitcho is Kunio Tokuoka (徳岡邦夫), grandson of Teiichi Yuki.

== Yuki Museum ==
In 1987 Teiichi Yuki opened the Yuki Museum of Art in Osaka, in the Hiranocho neighborhood, near to the Koraibashi restaurant. Yuki Museum is a small museum but known with its good collection mainly of tea utensils, including 11 Important Cultural Properties.

== Book ==
Kitcho: Japan's Ultimate Dining Experience was published in 2010 by Kodansha USA. The foreword was written by Thomas Keller, owner of The French Laundry.

== See also ==
- Ryōtei
