= Hirakata-juku =

Coordinates: 34°48′44″N 135°38′3″E

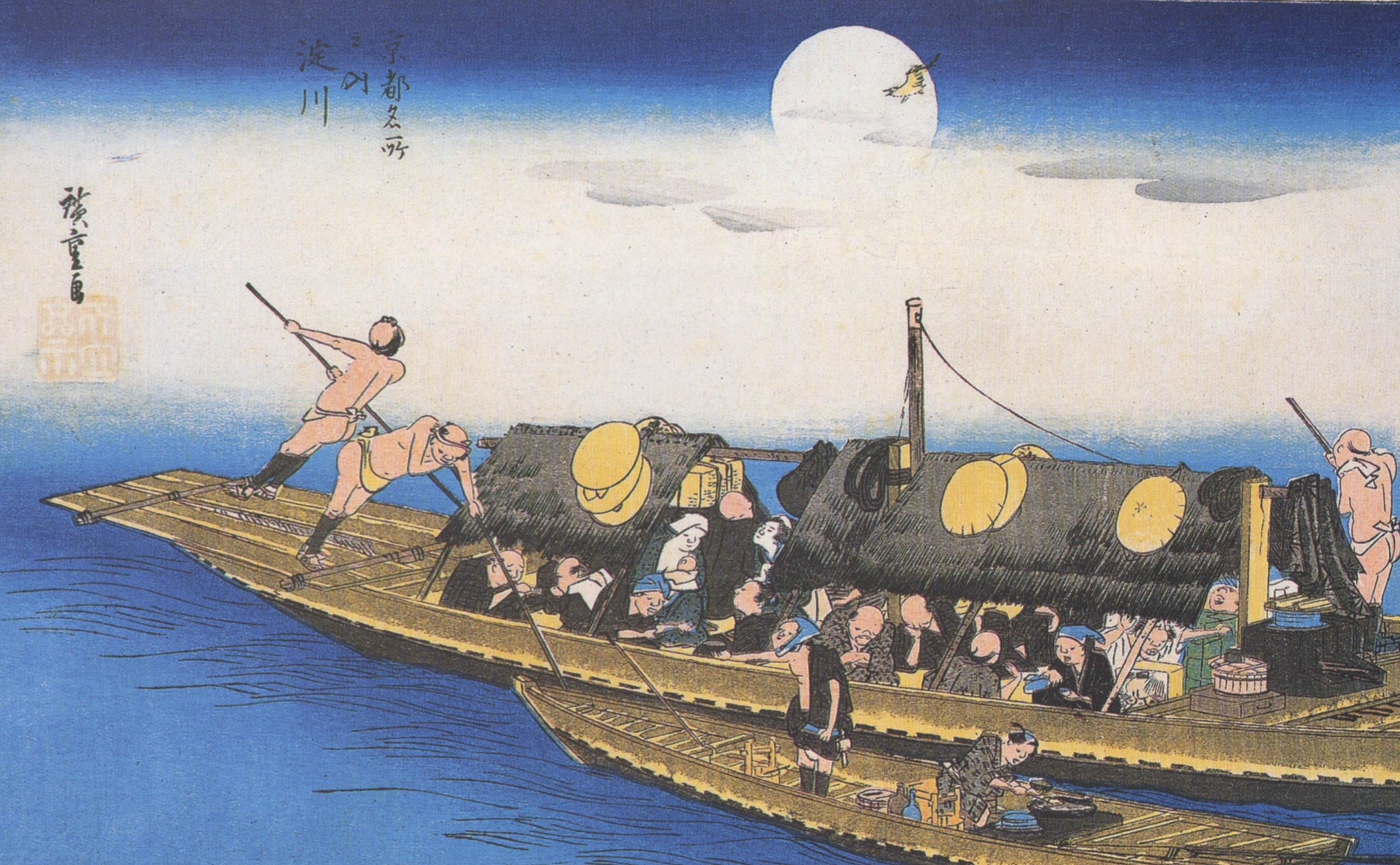
A boat going down the Yodo River on the way to Osaka.

Hirakata-juku (枚方宿, Hirakata-juku) was the third station on the Ōsaka Kaidō (or fifty-sixth of the fifty-seven stations of the Tōkaidō). It is located in the present-day city of Hirakata, Osaka Prefecture, Japan. It flourished as a port along the Yodo River and traces of the post town can still be seen today.

== History ==
Hirakata was formed in 1596, under the order of Toyotomi Hideyoshi. Though initially developed for other purposes, it became a post town when Tokugawa Ieyasu extended the Tōkaidō with the creation of the Ōsaka Kaidō in 1601. In 1758, it was said that the Tōkaidō extended from Shinagawa-juku to Moriguchi-juku, and Hirakata-juku was again described as part of the Tōkaidō in 1789. Because Hirakata is located at the approximate midpoint between Osaka and Kyoto, it was a major travel intersection. However, it not only flourished as a land-based center of traffic, but also as a port for the shipping that took place on the Yodo River.

Those who traveled through Hirakata-juku for sankin kōtai were generally those who were direct descendants of Ieyasu, including the fudai. In 1841, when Tokugawa Nariyuki participated in sankin kōtai, he brought with him 1,639 warriors, 2,337 servants and 103 horses. It was such a large traveling party that clan representatives traveled months ahead to help prepare for the party.

During the Meiji period, train lines were developed, which had a negative effect on the post town's economy. The JR Kyoto Line (originally developed in 1876) and the Keihan Electric Railway (developed in 1910) both provided a faster and cheaper means of transport, when compared to boats on the Yodo River.

== Description of the Post Town ==
Hirakata-juku was located in the modern-day city's Okashin-machi, Oka, Mitsuya and Doro-machi's Yongamura. It was approximately 24 kilometres (15 mi) from Kyoto and 20 kilometres (12 mi) from Osaka. The roads through the post town stretched approximately 1,447 metres (4,747 ft) and were 4.5 metres (15 ft) wide. It was a long and thin post town that was bordered to the north by the Yodo River, the south by Hirakatagaoka, and the west by Mount Mannenji. In Mitsuya, which was the center of the post town, there was one honjin and two sub-honjin, in addition to numerous other buildings for other travelers, whether they were coming by land or river.

== Neighboring Post Towns ==
Ōsaka Kaidō (extended Tōkaidō)
Yodo-juku - Hirakata-juku - Moriguchi-juku
