= List of Michelin-starred restaurants in Hokkaido =

The Michelin Guides have been published by the French tire company Michelin since 1900. They were designed as a guide to tell drivers about eateries they recommended to visit and to subtly sponsor their tires, by encouraging drivers to use their cars more and therefore need to replace the tires as they wore out. Over time, the stars that were given out started to become more valuable.

The Michelin Guide first entered the Japanese market with a list covering Tokyo, debuting in November 2007. Michelin would expand its coverage in Japan by issuing standalone guides for other regions in the country, including publishing a list for Hokkaido in 2012. Michelin would issue an updated list for the region in 2017, before suspending coverage indefinitely. There are presently no restaurants from Hokkaido with a Michelin star rating from the Michelin Guide.

Multiple anonymous Michelin inspectors visit the restaurants several times. They rate the restaurants on five criteria: "quality of products", "mastery of flavor and cooking techniques", "the personality of the chef represented in the dining experience", "value for money", and "consistency between inspectors' visits". Inspectors have at least ten years of expertise and create a list of popular restaurants supported by media reports, reviews, and diner popularity. If they reach a consensus, Michelin awards restaurants from one to three stars based on its evaluation methodology: One star means "high-quality cooking, worth a stop", two stars signify "excellent cooking, worth a detour", and three stars denote "exceptional cuisine, worth a special journey". The stars are not permanent and restaurants are constantly being re-evaluated. If the criteria are not met, the restaurant will lose its stars.

== Lists ==
Key
1 Michelin star	One Michelin star
2 Michelin stars	Two Michelin stars
3 Michelin stars	Three Michelin stars
—	The restaurant did not receive a star that year
Closed	The restaurant is no longer open

Michelin-starred restaurants
Name	Cuisine	Location	2012	2017	No guide (2018–2026)
Ajidokoro	Japanese	Kuriyama	1 Michelin star	2 Michelin stars	
Ajishige Hanare	Japanese	Sapporo – Chuo-ku	1 Michelin star	1 Michelin star	
Aki Nagao	French	Sapporo – Chuo-ku	—	1 Michelin star	
Arashiyama Kitcho	Japanese	Tōyako	2 Michelin stars	2 Michelin stars	Closed
Asperges	French	Biei	1 Michelin star	1 Michelin star	
Banquet	French	Sapporo – Chuo-ku	—	1 Michelin star	
Bi.blé	French	Biei	—	1 Michelin star	Closed
Bikuni Kanko House	Japanese	Shakotancho	2 Michelin stars	1 Michelin star	
Chimikepp	French	Tsubetsu	—	1 Michelin star	
Cote d'Or	French	Sapporo – Chuo-ku	1 Michelin star	1 Michelin star	
Date Okina	Japanese	Date	1 Michelin star	1 Michelin star	
Enoteca la Ricolma	Italian	Hakodate	—	1 Michelin star	
Fenêtre	French	Nakashibetsu	—	1 Michelin star	
Fratello di Mikuni	Italian	Kamikawa	—	1 Michelin star	
Fumoto	Japanese	Hakodate	2 Michelin stars	1 Michelin star	
Furano Hotel Restaurant	French	Furano	—	1 Michelin star	
Hanakoji Sawada	Japanese	Sapporo – Chuo-ku	2 Michelin stars	3 Michelin stars	Closed
Hassun	Japanese	Obihiro	2 Michelin stars	1 Michelin star	
Himeshara	Japanese	Sapporo – Chuo-ku	2 Michelin stars	2 Michelin stars	
Isezushi	Japanese	Otaru	1 Michelin star	1 Michelin star	
Ito	Japanese	Nakashibetsu	1 Michelin star	—	
Kadowaki	Seafood	Asahikawa	1 Michelin star	1 Michelin star	
Kamimura	French	Niseko	1 Michelin star	1 Michelin star	
Kappo Okada	Japanese	Kitami	2 Michelin stars	—	Closed
Kappo Umesasa (Note: Also known simply as Umesasa)	Japanese	Kitami	1 Michelin star	1 Michelin star	
Katsukanino Hanasaki	Seafood	Sapporo – Chuo-ku	—	1 Michelin star	
Kira	Japanese	Hakodate	1 Michelin star	—	
Kishin	Japanese	Kushiro	1 Michelin star	1 Michelin star	
Kisui	Japanese	Sapporo – Chuo-ku	1 Michelin star	1 Michelin star	
Kitanohana Hayashi	Japanese	Chitose	—	2 Michelin stars	
Kokon Yamahisa	Japanese	Sapporo – Chuo-ku	—	1 Michelin star	
Komatsu	Japanese	Sapporo – Chuo-ku	—	1 Michelin star	
Kushiage Taro	Japanese	Asahikawa	1 Michelin star	—	
L'Auberge de l'Ill Sapporo	French	Sapporo – Chuo-ku	—	1 Michelin star	
L'Enfant qui Rêve	French	Sapporo – Higashi-ku	—	1 Michelin star	
L'Oiseau par Matsunaga	French	Hakodate	—	1 Michelin star	
La Blancheur	French	Sapporo – Chuo-ku	1 Michelin star	1 Michelin star	Closed
La Tortue	French	Sapporo – Chuo-ku	1 Michelin star	—	Closed
Le Baerenthal	French	Sapporo – Chuo-ku	1 Michelin star	—	Closed
Le Gentilhomme	French	Sapporo – Chuo-ku	1 Michelin star	—	
Le Manҫa	French	Sapporo – Chuo-ku	—	1 Michelin star	Closed
Le Musée	Fusion	Sapporo – Chuo-ku	1 Michelin star	1 Michelin star	
Le Vent	French	Hakodate	1 Michelin star	—	Closed
Lien	French	Sapporo – Chuo-ku	—	1 Michelin star	Closed
Maccarina	French	Makkari	1 Michelin star	—	
Maruzushi	Japanese	Sapporo – Chuo-ku	1 Michelin star	1 Michelin star	
Masaki	Japanese	Sapporo – Chuo-ku	2 Michelin stars	1 Michelin star	
Méli Mélo	French	Sapporo – Chuo-ku	—	1 Michelin star	
Michel Bras Toya Japon	French	Tōyako	3 Michelin stars	2 Michelin stars	Closed
Mieda	Japanese	Sapporo – Chuo-ku	1 Michelin star	—	
Miki	Japanese	Sapporo – Chuo-ku	1 Michelin star	—	
Miya-Vie	French	Sapporo – Chuo-ku	1 Michelin star	1 Michelin star	
Molière	French	Sapporo – Chuo-ku	3 Michelin stars	3 Michelin stars	
Nigiri Kukizen	Japanese	Otaru	2 Michelin stars	2 Michelin stars	
Nihonshudojo Kyo	Japanese	Oden Sunagawa	1 Michelin star	1 Michelin star	Closed
Nukumi	Japanese	Sapporo – Chuo-ku	3 Michelin stars	2 Michelin stars	
Okuni	Japanese	Tomakomai	1 Michelin star	1 Michelin star	
Out of Africa	Japanese	Tōyako	1 Michelin star	1 Michelin star	
Quenelle	French	Sapporo – Chuo-ku	—	1 Michelin star	
Ristorante Kaoru	Italian	Ebetsu	—	1 Michelin star	Closed
Ryoriya So (Note: Also known simply as So)	Japanese	Sapporo – Chuo-ku	2 Michelin stars	2 Michelin stars	Closed
Santokurokumi	Japanese	Sapporo – Chuo-ku	1 Michelin star	1 Michelin star	
Sanyoan	Japanese	Otofuke	1 Michelin star	—	
Saryo Takinoya	Japanese	Sapporo – Chuo-ku	1 Michelin star	—	
Shikishusai Shunka	Japanese	Obihiro	1 Michelin star	—	Closed
Shubo Shinsen	Japanese	Sapporo – Chuo-ku	2 Michelin stars	2 Michelin stars	Closed
Sobakiri Nakamura	Japanese	Kitahiroshima	1 Michelin star	1 Michelin star	
Sushi Hidetaka	Japanese	Sapporo – Chuo-ku	—	1 Michelin star	Closed
Sushi Ikko	Japanese	Sapporo – Chuo-ku	1 Michelin star	2 Michelin stars	Closed
Sushi Minato	Japanese	Asahikawa	1 Michelin star	1 Michelin star	
Sushi Miyakawa	Japanese	Sapporo – Chuo-ku	—	3 Michelin stars	
Sushi Okuno	Japanese	Takikawa	—	1 Michelin star	Closed
Sushi Oneda	Japanese	Mori	1 Michelin star	1 Michelin star	Closed
Sushi Tanabe	Japanese	Sapporo – Chuo-ku	3 Michelin stars	—	
Sushidokoro Arima	Japanese	Sapporo – Chuo-ku	1 Michelin star	1 Michelin star	
Sushidokoro Hyotan	Japanese	Sapporo – Chuo-ku	1 Michelin star	—	
Sushidokoro Minami	Japanese	Hakodate	1 Michelin star	1 Michelin star	
Sushinaka	Japanese	Sapporo – Minami-ku	1 Michelin star	—	Closed
Sushisai Wakichi	Japanese	Sapporo – Chuo-ku	2 Michelin stars	2 Michelin stars	
Sushizen Honten	Japanese	Sapporo – Chuo-ku	2 Michelin stars	1 Michelin star	
Sushizen Susukinoten	Japanese	Sapporo – Chuo-ku	1 Michelin star	1 Michelin star	Closed
Susukino Sushikin	Japanese	Sapporo – Chuo-ku	—	1 Michelin star	
Suyama	Japanese	Sapporo – Chuo-ku	1 Michelin star	2 Michelin stars	
Takao	Italian	Sapporo – Chuo-ku	—	1 Michelin star	
Taku Maruyama	Japanese	Sapporo – Chuo-ku	—	1 Michelin star	
Takuzushi	Japanese	Sapporo – Chuo-ku	—	1 Michelin star	
Tamagawa-an	Japanese	Kushiro	1 Michelin star	—	
Tateoka Takeshi	French	Sapporo – Chuo-ku	—	1 Michelin star	
Tazawa	Japanese	Hakodate	1 Michelin star	1 Michelin star	Closed
Tempura Araki	Japanese	Sapporo – Chuo-ku	—	2 Michelin stars	
Teuchisoba Harunaya	Japanese	Wakkanai	1 Michelin star	—	Closed
Teuchisoba Kohashi	Japanese	Sapporo – Chuo-ku	1 Michelin star	1 Michelin star	
Teuchisoba Mansaku	Japanese	Kamifurano	1 Michelin star	1 Michelin star	
Toraya	Japanese	Sapporo – Chuo-ku	1 Michelin star	1 Michelin star	
Valore	Italian	Biei	—	1 Michelin star	
Vin	Steakhouse	Wakkanai	1 Michelin star	1 Michelin star	
Wakamatsu	Japanese	Hakodate	1 Michelin star	—	
Wasanjo Kataoka	Japanese	Asahikawa	1 Michelin star	—	
Yukio Sasaki	French	Sapporo – Chuo-ku	1 Michelin star	—	
Reference(s)					

== See also ==
- List of Michelin-starred restaurants in Japan
- List of Michelin-starred restaurants in Kyoto and Osaka
- List of Michelin-starred restaurants in Nara
- List of Michelin-starred restaurants in Tokyo
- Lists of restaurants

== Bibliography ==
- Michelin Guide Hokkaido 2012 Special Edition. Michelin Travel & Lifestyle. 2012. ISBN 978-4-904337-42-4.
- Michelin Guide Hokkaido 2017 Special Edition. Michelin Travel & Lifestyle. 2017. ISBN 978-4-904337-22-6.
