= Kōraibashi =

Kōraibashi 高麗橋
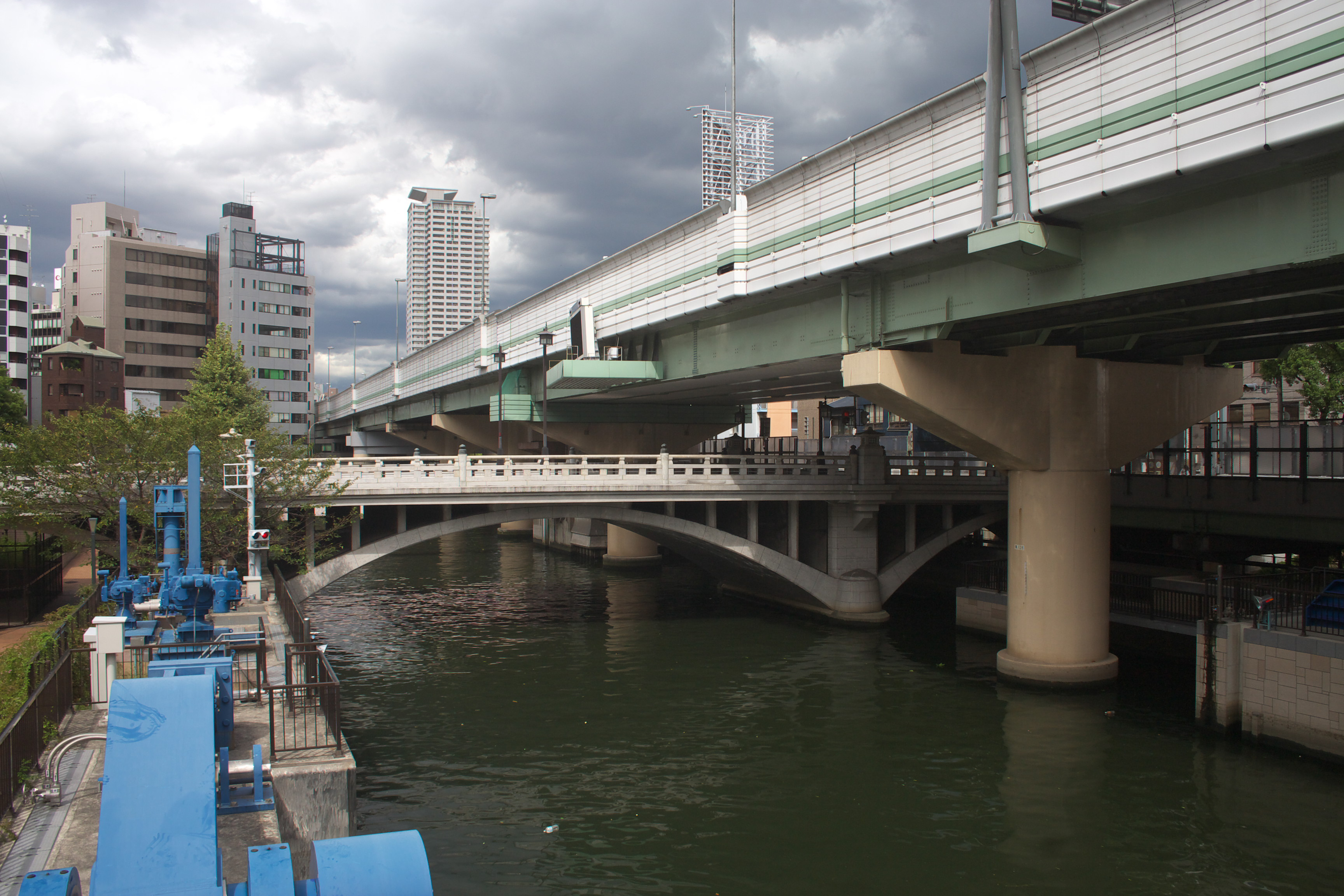
- Coordinates: 34°41′21″N 135°30′35″E
- Crosses: Higashi Yokobori River
- Locale: Chūō-ku, Osaka, Japan

Location
- Interactive map of Kōraibashi

Kōraibashi (高麗橋; lit. "Goryeo Bridge" or "Korea Bridge") is a bridge located in Chūō-ku in the city of Osaka, Osaka Prefecture, Japan.

It crosses over the O River, Tossahori River, and Higashi Yokobori River, all branches of the Kyū-Yodo River.

It shares its name with the surrounding area, Higashi-Kōraibashi, and the "urban thoroughfare" that forms its "axis" with Osaka Castle.

When the original structure was built in 1870, it symbolized Japanese modernity, "a connector in both place and time".

== Naming ==
The area received the name of "Kōrai" during the Asuka or Nara period, when ancient Japan was in close contact with kingdoms on the Korean Peninsula.

The envoy to Korea was called komanomuratsumi (高麗館) and when Toyotomi Hideyoshi was dividing up the areas within Osaka, he chose those same kanji.

== Neighboring sites and towns ==
- Ōsaka Kaidō

Moriguchi-juku – Kōraibashi (ending location)

- Kitahama Station
- Nakanoshima
- Naniwabashi Station
