= Yuki Museum of Art =

- 湯木美術館
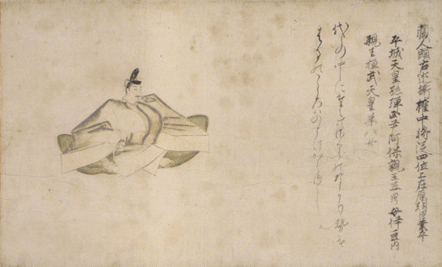
- Ariwara no Narihira (ICP)
- Interactive map of the Yuki Museum of Art area

General information
- Location: 3-3-9, Hirano-chō, Chūō-ku, Osaka, Osaka Prefecture, Japan
- Coordinates: 34°41′15″N 135°30′08″E
- Opened: November 1987

Website
- www.yuki-museum.or.jp

Yuki Museum of Art (湯木美術館, Yuki Bijutsukan) opened in Chūō-ku, Osaka, Japan, in 1987. The collection, built up by Yuki Teiichi (湯木貞一) of kaiseki restaurant Kitchō fame, includes twelve Important Cultural Properties and three Important Art Objects.

== See also ==
- Fujita Art Museum
- Masaki Art Museum
- Kubosō Memorial Museum of Arts, Izumi
