= List of Michelin-starred restaurants in Nara =

As of the 2026 Michelin Guide, there are 22 restaurants in the Japanese prefecture of Nara with a Michelin star rating.

The Michelin Guides have been published by the French tire company Michelin since 1900. They were designed as a guide to tell drivers about eateries they recommended to visit and to subtly sponsor their tires, by encouraging drivers to use their cars more and therefore need to replace the tires as they wore out. Over time, the stars that were given out started to become more valuable.

The Michelin Guide first entered the Japanese market with a list covering Tokyo, debuting in November 2007. Michelin would expand its coverage in Japan by issuing standalone guides for other regions in the country, including Nara's which debuted in 2022. From 2010 to 2022, Nara was part of the Kansai Michelin region list that also included Kobe, Kyoto, and Osaka.

Multiple anonymous Michelin inspectors visit the restaurants several times. They rate the restaurants on five criteria: "quality of products", "mastery of flavor and cooking techniques", "the personality of the chef represented in the dining experience", "value for money", and "consistency between inspectors' visits". Inspectors have at least ten years of expertise and create a list of popular restaurants supported by media reports, reviews, and diner popularity. If they reach a consensus, Michelin awards restaurants from one to three stars based on its evaluation methodology: One star means "high-quality cooking, worth a stop", two stars signify "excellent cooking, worth a detour", and three stars denote "exceptional cuisine, worth a special journey". The stars are not permanent and restaurants are constantly being re-evaluated. If the criteria are not met, the restaurant will lose its stars.

== Lists ==
Key
1 Michelin star	One Michelin star
2 Michelin stars	Two Michelin stars
—	The restaurant did not receive a star that year
Closed	The restaurant is no longer open

=== 2022–2025 ===
Michelin-starred restaurants
Name	Cuisine	Location	2022	2023	2024	2025	2026
à plus	French	Gose	—	—	—	1 Michelin star	1 Michelin star
Ajinotabibito Roman	Japanese	Nara City	1 Michelin star	1 Michelin star	1 Michelin star	1 Michelin star	1 Michelin star
Ajinokaze Nishimura	Japanese	Sakurai	1 Michelin star	1 Michelin star	1 Michelin star	1 Michelin star	1 Michelin star
akordu	Innovative	Nara City	2 Michelin stars	2 Michelin stars	2 Michelin stars	2 Michelin stars	2 Michelin stars
Da Terra	Italian	Asuka	—	1 Michelin star	1 Michelin star	1 Michelin star	1 Michelin star
Gen	Japanese	Nara City	1 Michelin star	1 Michelin star	—	—	—
Gokan Uogin	Japanese	Nara City	1 Michelin star	1 Michelin star	1 Michelin star	1 Michelin star	1 Michelin star
Hoshino	Japanese	Nara City	—	—	—	—	1 Michelin star
Inada	Japanese	Ikoma	1 Michelin star	1 Michelin star	1 Michelin star	—	—
Kaiseki Morimoto	Japanese	Kashihara	1 Michelin star	1 Michelin star	1 Michelin star	1 Michelin star	1 Michelin star
Koikiryori Aji Manso	Japanese	Nara City	1 Michelin star	1 Michelin star	1 Michelin star	1 Michelin star	1 Michelin star
L'Auberge de Plaisance	French	Sakurai	1 Michelin star	1 Michelin star	1 Michelin star	Closed	
La Terrasse Irisée	French	Nara City	1 Michelin star	1 Michelin star	1 Michelin star	Closed	
La Trace	French	Nara City	1 Michelin star	1 Michelin star	1 Michelin star	1 Michelin star	1 Michelin star
Lega'	Italian	Katsuragi	—	1 Michelin star	1 Michelin star	1 Michelin star	1 Michelin star
Matsuki	Japanese	Nara City	1 Michelin star	1 Michelin star	1 Michelin star	1 Michelin star	1 Michelin star
Musoan	Japanese	Nara City	1 Michelin star	1 Michelin star	1 Michelin star	—	—
Nara Nikon	Japanese	Nara City	2 Michelin stars	2 Michelin stars	2 Michelin stars	2 Michelin stars	2 Michelin stars
Naramachi Kuko (Note: Was named Chugokusai Naramachi Kuko until 2024)	Chinese	Nara City	1 Michelin star	1 Michelin star	1 Michelin star	1 Michelin star	1 Michelin star
Okada	Japanese	Nara City	1 Michelin star	1 Michelin star	1 Michelin star	1 Michelin star	1 Michelin star
Oryori Hanagaki	Japanese	Nara City	2 Michelin stars	2 Michelin stars	2 Michelin stars	2 Michelin stars	2 Michelin stars
Oryori Hirooka	Japanese	Nara City	1 Michelin star	1 Michelin star	1 Michelin star	1 Michelin star	1 Michelin star
SÉN	Innovative	Tenkawa	—	—	—	1 Michelin star	1 Michelin star
Sushi Kawashima	Japanese	Kashihara	1 Michelin star	1 Michelin star	1 Michelin star	1 Michelin star	1 Michelin star
Tsukumo	Japanese	Nara City	2 Michelin stars	2 Michelin stars	2 Michelin stars	2 Michelin stars	2 Michelin stars
Villa Communico (Note: Was named Communico until 2023, before shutting down and changing its concept to become Villa Communico)	Italian	Nara City	1 Michelin star	1 Michelin star	Closed	1 Michelin star	1 Michelin star
Wa Yamamura	Japanese	Nara City	1 Michelin star	1 Michelin star	1 Michelin star	1 Michelin star	1 Michelin star
Reference(s)							

=== 2010–2016 ===
Between 2010 and 2016, Nara restaurants were reviewed and included in the Michelin Guide covering Kyoto, Osaka, Kobe, and Nara. Michelin suspended reviewing Nara restaurants following the 2016 guide, until introducing a standalone guide for Nara in 2022.

== See also ==
- List of Michelin-starred restaurants in Japan
- List of Michelin-starred restaurants in Hokkaido
- List of Michelin-starred restaurants in Kyoto and Osaka
- List of Michelin-starred restaurants in Tokyo
- Lists of restaurants
