= Moriguchi-juku =

Moriguchi-juku 守口宿
- Location within Japan
- Coordinates: 34°44′17″N 135°33′56″E
- Country: Japan

Moriguchi-juku (守口宿, Moriguchi-juku) was the fourth station on the Ōsaka Kaidō (or fifty-seventh of the fifty-seven stations of the Tōkaidō). It is located in the present-day city of Moriguchi, Osaka Prefecture, Japan. It spread through the modern Honmachi, Tatsuda-dōri and Hama-machi.

== History ==
Moriguchi was always an important traveling center, but it was not until 1616, that it was officially established as a post town. According to a guide published in the latter part of the Edo period, it had one honjin, in addition to 27 other inns.

Located approximately 12 kilometres (7 mi) from Hirakata-juku and 8 kilometres (5 mi) from Kōraibashi, horses were not necessary for this part of the journey and people generally traveled by foot. Originally, there was not any ferry service along the Yodo River, which ran along the path, but development of the ferry service further helped the post town flourish.

Today, there are some remains of the former post town. They can be found on the left bank of the Yodo River.

== Neighboring post towns ==
Ōsaka Kaidō (extended Tōkaidō)
Hirakata-juku – Moriguchi-juku – Kōraibashi (ending location)
