= Hajime (restaurant) =

Coordinates: 34°41′19.1″N 135°29′45.7″E

- Interactive map of Hajime

Restaurant information
- Owner: Hajime Yoneda
- Chef: Hajime Yoneda
- Rating: (Michelin Guide)
- Location: Osaka, Japan
- Website: hajime-artistes.com

Hajime, officially Hajime Restaurant Gastronomique is a restaurant in Osaka, Japan named after its owner and chef Hajime Yoneda (born 1972). The restaurant was opened in May 2008 and only a year and a half later received a three-star rating in the Michelin Guide, then the only restaurant in Osaka to receive that distinction.

Hajime Yoneda is a graduate of Kinki University's Faculty of Science and Engineering and worked as a design engineer for a company making parts for electronic devices in order to save money for culinary school. He attended the culinary academy in Osaka and later trained in restaurants in Osaka and Kobe. He moved to France in 2002.

== See also ==
- List of Michelin-starred restaurants in Japan
