= Kitahama Station =

Kitahama Station is the name of two Japanese railway stations:

- Kitahama Station (Hokkaidō), JR Hokkaido's station in Abashiri
- Kitahama Station (Osaka), Keihan Line and Osaka Subway's station in Osaka
