= List of Michelin-starred restaurants in Hong Kong and Macau =

As of the 2026 Michelin Guide, there are 98 restaurants in Hong Kong and Macau with a Michelin-star rating. The Michelin Guides have been published by the French tire company Michelin since 1900. They were designed as a guide to tell drivers about eateries they recommended to visit and to subtly sponsor their tires, by encouraging drivers to use their cars more and therefore need to replace the tires as they wore out. Over time, the stars that were given out became more valuable.

Multiple anonymous Michelin inspectors visit the restaurants several times. They rate the restaurants on five criteria: "quality of products", "mastery of flavor and cooking techniques", "the personality of the chef represented in the dining experience", "value for money", and "consistency between inspectors' visits". Inspectors have at least ten years of expertise and create a list of popular restaurants supported by media reports, reviews, and diner popularity. If they reach a consensus, Michelin awards restaurants from one to three stars based on its evaluation methodology: one star means "high-quality cooking, worth a stop", two stars signify "excellent cooking, worth a detour", and three stars denote "exceptional cuisine, worth a special journey". The stars are not permanent and restaurants are constantly re-evaluated. If the criteria are not met, the restaurant will lose its stars.

The 2009 edition was the first edition of the Michelin Guide to Hong Kong and Macau to be published, making Hong Kong and Macau the second and third Asian territory to receive a Michelin guide, after Tokyo, Japan in 2008.

== Lists ==
=== 2021–2026 ===
Key
1 Michelin star	One Michelin star
2 Michelin stars	Two Michelin stars
3 Michelin stars	Three Michelin stars
—	The restaurant did not receive a star that year
Closed	The restaurant is no longer open

Michelin-starred restaurants
Name	Cuisine	Territory	Location	2021	2022	2023	2024	2025	2026
8 1/2 Otto e Mezzo Bombana	Italian	Hong Kong	The Landmark Alexandra	3 Michelin stars	3 Michelin stars	3 Michelin stars	3 Michelin stars	3 Michelin stars	3 Michelin stars
8 1/2 Otto e Mezzo Bombana	Italian	Macau	Galaxy Macau	1 Michelin star	1 Michelin star	1 Michelin star	1 Michelin star	1 Michelin star	1 Michelin star
Aaharn	Thai	Hong Kong	Hollywood Road	1 Michelin star	1 Michelin star	—	—	Closed	
Ah Yat Harbour View	Cantonese	Hong Kong	iSQUARE	1 Michelin star	—	—	—	—	—
Alain Ducasse at Morpheus	French	Macau	City of Dreams	2 Michelin stars	2 Michelin stars	2 Michelin stars	2 Michelin stars	2 Michelin stars	2 Michelin stars
Aji	Innovative	Macau	Cotai	—	—	—	—	1 Michelin star	1 Michelin star
Amber	French	Hong Kong	The Landmark, Mandarin Oriental	2 Michelin stars	2 Michelin stars	2 Michelin stars	2 Michelin stars	3 Michelin stars	3 Michelin stars
Ami	French	Hong Kong	The Landmark Alexandra	—	—	—	—	1 Michelin star	1 Michelin star
Andō	Innovative	Hong Kong	Central	1 Michelin star	1 Michelin star	1 Michelin star	1 Michelin star	1 Michelin star	1 Michelin star
Arbor	Innovative	Hong Kong	Central	2 Michelin stars	2 Michelin stars	2 Michelin stars	2 Michelin stars	2 Michelin stars	2 Michelin stars
Arcane	European	Hong Kong	18 On Lan Street, Central	1 Michelin star	1 Michelin star	1 Michelin star	1 Michelin star	1 Michelin star	1 Michelin star
Beefbar	Steakhouse	Hong Kong	Central	1 Michelin star	1 Michelin star	1 Michelin star	1 Michelin star	1 Michelin star	1 Michelin star
Belon	French	Hong Kong	Hollywood Road	—	1 Michelin star	1 Michelin star	1 Michelin star	1 Michelin star	1 Michelin star
Bo Innovation	French	Hong Kong	Central	2 Michelin stars	2 Michelin stars	2 Michelin stars	2 Michelin stars	2 Michelin stars	2 Michelin stars
Caprice	French	Hong Kong	Four Seasons	3 Michelin stars	3 Michelin stars	3 Michelin stars	3 Michelin stars	3 Michelin stars	3 Michelin stars
Celebrity Cuisine	Cantonese	Hong Kong	Lan Kwai Fong	1 Michelin star	Closed				
Chaat	Indian	Hong Kong	Rosewood Hong Kong	—	1 Michelin star	1 Michelin star	1 Michelin star	1 Michelin star	1 Michelin star
Chef Tam's Seasons	Cantonese	Macau	Wynn Palace	—	—	—	1 Michelin star	2 Michelin stars	2 Michelin stars
China Tang	Cantonese	Hong Kong		—	—	—	—	—	1 Michelin star
Cristal Room By Anne-Sophie Pic	French	Hong Kong	The Landmark Atrium	—	—	—	1 Michelin star	1 Michelin star	2 Michelin stars
D.H.K.	Cantonese, Dim sum	Hong Kong	Wanchai	—	—	1 Michelin star	Closed		
Don Alfonso 1890	Italian	Macau		—	—	—	—	—	1 Michelin star
Duddell's	Cantonese	Hong Kong	Central	1 Michelin star	1 Michelin star	1 Michelin star	1 Michelin star	1 Michelin star	1 Michelin star
Écriture	French	Hong Kong	Central	2 Michelin stars	2 Michelin stars	2 Michelin stars	Closed		
Épure	French	Hong Kong	Harbour City	1 Michelin star	1 Michelin star	1 Michelin star	1 Michelin star	1 Michelin star	1 Michelin star
Estro	Italian	Hong Kong	Central	—	—	1 Michelin star	1 Michelin star	1 Michelin star	1 Michelin star
Feng Wei Ju	Hunanese	Macau	StarWorld Hotel	2 Michelin stars	2 Michelin stars	2 Michelin stars	2 Michelin stars	2 Michelin stars	2 Michelin stars
Feuille	French	Hong Kong	198 Wellington Street	—	—	—	1 Michelin star	1 Michelin star	1 Michelin star
Five Foot Road	Sichuan	Macau	MGM Cotai	—	—	1 Michelin star	1 Michelin star	1 Michelin star	1 Michelin star
Fook Lam Moon	Cantonese	Hong Kong	Wan Chai branch	1 Michelin star	1 Michelin star	1 Michelin star	1 Michelin star	1 Michelin star	1 Michelin star
Forum Restaurant	Cantonese	Hong Kong	Sino Plaza	3 Michelin stars	3 Michelin stars	3 Michelin stars	3 Michelin stars	3 Michelin stars	3 Michelin stars
Fu Ho	Cantonese	Hong Kong	Tsim Sha Tsui branch	1 Michelin star	1 Michelin star	1 Michelin star	1 Michelin star	1 Michelin star	1 Michelin star
Gaddi's	French	Hong Kong	Peninsula Hotel	1 Michelin star	1 Michelin star	1 Michelin star	1 Michelin star	1 Michelin star	1 Michelin star
Godenya	Japanese	Hong Kong	Sheung Wan	—	—	1 Michelin star	1 Michelin star	1 Michelin star	1 Michelin star
Golden Flower	Chinese	Macau	Wynn Macau	2 Michelin stars	—	—	—	—	Closed
Guo Fu Lou	Cantonese	Hong Kong	Central	1 Michelin star	Closed				
Hansik Goo	Korean	Hong Kong	198 Wellington Street	—	1 Michelin star	1 Michelin star	1 Michelin star	1 Michelin star	1 Michelin star
Ho Hung Kee	Noodles and Congee	Hong Kong	Causeway Bay branch	1 Michelin star	1 Michelin star	1 Michelin star	1 Michelin star	1 Michelin star	1 Michelin star
I M Teppanyaki & Wine	Teppanyaki	Hong Kong	Tin Hau	1 Michelin star	1 Michelin star	1 Michelin star	1 Michelin star	1 Michelin star	1 Michelin star
Imperial Treasure Fine Chinese Cuisine	Cantonese	Hong Kong	Tsim Sha Tsui	1 Michelin star	1 Michelin star	1 Michelin star	1 Michelin star	1 Michelin star	1 Michelin star
Jade Dragon	Cantonese	Macau	City of Dreams	3 Michelin stars	3 Michelin stars	3 Michelin stars	3 Michelin stars	3 Michelin stars	3 Michelin stars
Jardin de Jade	Shanghainese	Hong Kong	Sun Hung Kai Centre	1 Michelin star	1 Michelin star	1 Michelin star	—	—	—
Kam's Roast Goose	Cantonese	Hong Kong	Wan Chai	1 Michelin star	1 Michelin star	1 Michelin star	1 Michelin star	1 Michelin star	1 Michelin star
Kappo Rin	Japanese	Hong Kong	The Landmark, Mandarin Oriental	—	—	1 Michelin star	1 Michelin star	1 Michelin star	1 Michelin star
Kashiwaya Hong Kong	Japanese	Hong Kong	18 On Lan St	2 Michelin stars	Closed				
L'Atelier de Joël Robuchon	French	Hong Kong	The Landmark Atrium	3 Michelin stars	3 Michelin stars	3 Michelin stars	3 Michelin stars	—	2 Michelin stars
L'Envol	French	Hong Kong	The St. Regis Hong Kong	2 Michelin stars	2 Michelin stars	2 Michelin stars	2 Michelin stars	2 Michelin stars	2 Michelin stars
Lai Ching Heen (formerly Yan Toh Heen)	Cantonese	Hong Kong	Regent Hong Kong	1 Michelin star	2 Michelin stars	2 Michelin stars	2 Michelin stars	2 Michelin stars	2 Michelin stars
Lai Heen	Cantonese	Macau	Galaxy Macau	1 Michelin star	1 Michelin star	1 Michelin star	1 Michelin star	1 Michelin star	1 Michelin star
Lei Garden	Cantonese	Hong Kong	Kwun Tong Branch	1 Michelin star	—	—	—	—	—
Liu Yuan Pavilion	Shanghainese	Hong Kong	Wan Chai	1 Michelin star	1 Michelin star	1 Michelin star	1 Michelin star	1 Michelin star	1 Michelin star
Loaf On	Seafood	Hong Kong	Sai Kung	1 Michelin star	1 Michelin star	1 Michelin star	1 Michelin star	1 Michelin star	1 Michelin star
Louise	French	Hong Kong	Hollywood Road	1 Michelin star	1 Michelin star	1 Michelin star	1 Michelin star	1 Michelin star	1 Michelin star
Lung King Heen	Cantonese	Hong Kong	Four Seasons	3 Michelin stars	3 Michelin stars	2 Michelin stars	2 Michelin stars	2 Michelin stars	2 Michelin stars
Man Ho	Cantonese	Hong Kong	JW Marriott Hong Kong	1 Michelin star	1 Michelin star	1 Michelin star	1 Michelin star	1 Michelin star	1 Michelin star
Man Wah	Cantonese	Hong Kong	Mandarin Oriental	1 Michelin star	1 Michelin star	1 Michelin star	1 Michelin star	1 Michelin star	1 Michelin star
Mandarin Grill + Bar	Contemporary	Hong Kong	Mandarin Oriental	1 Michelin star	1 Michelin star	1 Michelin star	1 Michelin star	—	—
Ming Court	Cantonese	Hong Kong	Cordis Hong Kong	1 Michelin star	1 Michelin star	1 Michelin star	1 Michelin star	—	—
Mizumi	Japanese	Macau	Wynn Macau	2 Michelin stars	2 Michelin stars	2 Michelin stars	2 Michelin stars	1 Michelin star	1 Michelin star
Mono	Latin American	Hong Kong	18 On Lan St	—	1 Michelin star	1 Michelin star	1 Michelin star	1 Michelin star	1 Michelin star
Mora	Innovative	Hong Kong	Sheung Wan	—	—	—	1 Michelin star	1 Michelin star	1 Michelin star
Nagamoto	Japanese	Hong Kong	18 On Lan St	—	—	1 Michelin star	1 Michelin star	1 Michelin star	1 Michelin star
Neighborhood	European	Hong Kong	Hollywood Road	—	—	1 Michelin star	1 Michelin star	1 Michelin star	1 Michelin star
New Punjab Club	Indian, Pakistani	Hong Kong	Lan Kwai Fong	1 Michelin star	1 Michelin star	1 Michelin star	1 Michelin star	1 Michelin star	1 Michelin star
Noi	Italian	Hong Kong	Four Seasons	—	—	1 Michelin star	2 Michelin stars	2 Michelin stars	2 Michelin stars
Octavium	Italian	Hong Kong	Central	1 Michelin star	2 Michelin stars	2 Michelin stars	2 Michelin stars	2 Michelin stars	2 Michelin stars
Palace Garden	Cantonese	Macau		—	—	—	—	—	1 Michelin star
Pang's Kitchen	Cantonese	Hong Kong	Happy Valley	1 Michelin star	1 Michelin star	1 Michelin star	1 Michelin star	1 Michelin star	1 Michelin star
Pearl Dragon	Cantonese	Macau	Studio City	1 Michelin star	1 Michelin star	1 Michelin star	1 Michelin star	1 Michelin star	1 Michelin star
Petrus	French	Hong Kong	Island Shangri-La	1 Michelin star	1 Michelin star	1 Michelin star	1 Michelin star	1 Michelin star	1 Michelin star
Plaisance by Mauro Colagreco	French	Hong Kong	1 Duddell St	—	—	—	—	1 Michelin star	1 Michelin star
Racines	French	Hong Kong	Sheung Wan	—	—	—	1 Michelin star	1 Michelin star	1 Michelin star
Robuchon au Dôme	French	Macau	Grand Lisboa	3 Michelin stars	3 Michelin stars	3 Michelin stars	3 Michelin stars	3 Michelin stars	3 Michelin stars
Roganic	European	Hong Kong	Sino Plaza	1 Michelin star	1 Michelin star	1 Michelin star	1 Michelin star	1 Michelin star	1 Michelin star
Rùn	Cantonese	Hong Kong	The St. Regis Hong Kong	1 Michelin star	1 Michelin star	2 Michelin stars	2 Michelin stars	2 Michelin stars	2 Michelin stars
Ryota Kappou Modern	Japanese	Hong Kong	18 On Lan St	1 Michelin star	1 Michelin star	1 Michelin star	1 Michelin star	1 Michelin star	1 Michelin star
Seventh Son	Cantonese	Hong Kong	Wharney Hotel	—	1 Michelin star	1 Michelin star	1 Michelin star	1 Michelin star	1 Michelin star
Shang Palace	Cantonese	Hong Kong	Kowloon Shangri-La	1 Michelin star	1 Michelin star	1 Michelin star	1 Michelin star	1 Michelin star	1 Michelin star
Sichuan Moon	Sichuan	Macau	Wynn Palace	2 Michelin stars	2 Michelin stars	2 Michelin stars	Closed		
Spring Moon	Cantonese	Hong Kong	Peninsula Hotel	1 Michelin star	1 Michelin star	1 Michelin star	1 Michelin star	1 Michelin star	1 Michelin star
Summer Palace	Cantonese	Hong Kong	Island Shangri-La	1 Michelin star	1 Michelin star	1 Michelin star	1 Michelin star	1 Michelin star	1 Michelin star
Sun Tung Lok	Cantonese	Hong Kong	Tsim Sha Tsui	2 Michelin stars	2 Michelin stars	2 Michelin stars	1 Michelin star	1 Michelin star	1 Michelin star
Sushi Kinetsu	Sushi	Macau	City of Dreams	—	—	—	1 Michelin star	1 Michelin star	1 Michelin star
Sushi Kissho by Miyakawa	Sushi	Macau	Raffles At Galaxy Macau	—	—	—	—	1 Michelin star	1 Michelin star
Sushi Saito	Sushi	Hong Kong	Four Seasons	2 Michelin stars	1 Michelin star	1 Michelin star	1 Michelin star	1 Michelin star	—
Sushi Takeshi	Sushi	Hong Kong		—	—	—	—	—	1 Michelin star
Sushi Shikon	Japanese	Hong Kong	The Landmark, Mandarin Oriental	3 Michelin stars	3 Michelin stars	3 Michelin stars	3 Michelin stars	3 Michelin stars	3 Michelin stars
Sushi Wadatsumi	Sushi	Hong Kong	K11 MUSEA	—	1 Michelin star	1 Michelin star	1 Michelin star	1 Michelin star	1 Michelin star
T'ang Court	Cantonese	Hong Kong	The Langham	3 Michelin stars	3 Michelin stars	3 Michelin stars	3 Michelin stars	3 Michelin stars	3 Michelin stars
Ta Vie	Innovative	Hong Kong	The Pottinger	2 Michelin stars	2 Michelin stars	3 Michelin stars	3 Michelin stars	3 Michelin stars	3 Michelin stars
Takumi by Daisuke Mori	Japanese	Hong Kong	Wan Chai	1 Michelin star	1 Michelin star	1 Michelin star	1 Michelin star	Closed	
Tate Dining Room	Innovative	Hong Kong	Hollywood Road	2 Michelin stars	2 Michelin stars	2 Michelin stars	2 Michelin stars	2 Michelin stars	2 Michelin stars
The Araki	Japanese	Hong Kong	Tsim Sha Tsui	1 Michelin star	1 Michelin star	1 Michelin star	Closed		
The Chairman	Cantonese	Hong Kong	198 Wellington St	1 Michelin star	1 Michelin star	1 Michelin star	1 Michelin star	1 Michelin star	1 Michelin star
The Demon Celebrity	Cantonese	Hong Kong	Lan Kwai Fong	—	—	1 Michelin star	1 Michelin star	—	—
The Legacy House	Chinese	Hong Kong	Rosewood Hong Kong	—	—	—	1 Michelin star	1 Michelin star	1 Michelin star
The Eight	Cantonese	Macau	Grand Lisboa	3 Michelin stars	3 Michelin stars	3 Michelin stars	2 Michelin stars	2 Michelin stars	2 Michelin stars
The Golden Peacock	Indian	Macau	The Venetian Macao	1 Michelin star	Closed				
The Huaiyang Garden	Huaiyang	Macau	The Londoner Macao	—	—	1 Michelin star	2 Michelin stars	2 Michelin stars	2 Michelin stars
The Kitchen	Steakhouse	Macau	Grand Lisboa	1 Michelin star	1 Michelin star	1 Michelin star	—	—	—
Tim Ho Wan	Dim sum	Hong Kong	Sham Shui Po	1 Michelin star	—	—	—	—	—
Tim's Kitchen	Cantonese	Macau	Casino Lisboa	1 Michelin star	Closed				
Tin Lung Heen	Cantonese	Hong Kong	Ritz-Carlton	2 Michelin stars	2 Michelin stars	2 Michelin stars	2 Michelin stars	2 Michelin stars	2 Michelin stars
Tosca di Angelo	Italian	Hong Kong	Ritz-Carlton	1 Michelin star	1 Michelin star	1 Michelin star	1 Michelin star	1 Michelin star	1 Michelin star
Tuber Umberto Bombana	Italian	Hong Kong	K11 MUSEA	—	—	—	—	1 Michelin star	1 Michelin star
Vea	Innovative	Hong Kong	198 Wellington St	1 Michelin star	1 Michelin star	1 Michelin star	1 Michelin star	1 Michelin star	1 Michelin star
Whey	Asian	Hong Kong	198 Wellington St	—	1 Michelin star	1 Michelin star	1 Michelin star	1 Michelin star	1 Michelin star
Wing Lei	Cantonese	Macau	Wynn Macau	2 Michelin stars	2 Michelin stars	2 Michelin stars	2 Michelin stars	2 Michelin stars	2 Michelin stars
Wing Lei Palace	Cantonese	Macau	Wynn Palace	1 Michelin star	1 Michelin star	1 Michelin star	—	Closed	—
Xin Rong Ji	Taizhou	Hong Kong	Wan Chai	1 Michelin star	1 Michelin star	1 Michelin star	1 Michelin star	1 Michelin star	1 Michelin star
Yardbird	Yakitori	Hong Kong	Sheung Wan	1 Michelin star	1 Michelin star	1 Michelin star	1 Michelin star	1 Michelin star	1 Michelin star
Yat Lok	Cantonese	Hong Kong	Stanley Street	1 Michelin star	1 Michelin star	1 Michelin star	1 Michelin star	1 Michelin star	1 Michelin star
Yat Tung Heen	Cantonese	Hong Kong	Eaton Hotel Hong Kong	1 Michelin star	1 Michelin star	1 Michelin star	1 Michelin star	1 Michelin star	1 Michelin star
Yè Shanghai	Shanghainese	Hong Kong	Tsim Sha Tsui branch	1 Michelin star	1 Michelin star	1 Michelin star	1 Michelin star	1 Michelin star	1 Michelin star
Ying	Cantonese	Macau	Altira Macau	1 Michelin star	1 Michelin star	1 Michelin star	1 Michelin star	1 Michelin star	1 Michelin star
Ying Jee Club	Cantonese	Hong Kong	Nexxus Building	2 Michelin stars	2 Michelin stars	2 Michelin stars	2 Michelin stars	2 Michelin stars	2 Michelin stars
Yong Fu	Chinese	Hong Kong	Wan Chai	—	1 Michelin star	1 Michelin star	1 Michelin star	1 Michelin star	1 Michelin star
Zi Yat Heen	Cantonese	Macau	Four Seasons Macao	1 Michelin star	1 Michelin star	1 Michelin star	1 Michelin star	1 Michelin star	1 Michelin star
Zest by Konishi	French-inspired Japanese	Hong Kong	18 On Lan St	1 Michelin star	1 Michelin star	1 Michelin star	1 Michelin star	Closed	
Zhejiang Heen	Zhejiang	Hong Kong	Wan Chai	1 Michelin star	1 Michelin star	1 Michelin star	1 Michelin star	1 Michelin star	1 Michelin star
Zuicho	Japanese	Hong Kong	Sheung Wan	1 Michelin star	1 Michelin star	1 Michelin star	1 Michelin star	1 Michelin star	—
Zuicho	Japanese	Macau	The Karl Lagerfeld Macau	—	—	—	—	1 Michelin star	1 Michelin star
References									

=== 2009–2020 ===
Key
1 Michelin star	One Michelin star
2 Michelin stars	Two Michelin stars
3 Michelin stars	Three Michelin stars
—	The restaurant did not receive a star that year
Closed	The restaurant is no longer open

Michelin-starred restaurants
Name	Territory	Location	2009	2010	2011	2012	2013	2014	2015	2016	2017	2018	2019	2020
8 1/2 Otto e Mezzo Bombana	Hong Kong	Alexandra House	—	—	2 Michelin stars	3 Michelin stars	3 Michelin stars	3 Michelin stars	3 Michelin stars	3 Michelin stars	3 Michelin stars	3 Michelin stars	3 Michelin stars	3 Michelin stars
8 1/2 Otto e Mezzo Bombana	Macau	Galaxy Macau	—	—	—	—	—	—	—	1 Michelin star	1 Michelin star	1 Michelin star	1 Michelin star	1 Michelin star
Aaharn	Hong Kong	Hollywood Road	—	—	—	—	—	—	—	—	—	—	—	1 Michelin star
Ah Yat Harbour View	Hong Kong	iSQUARE	—	—	—	1 Michelin star	2 Michelin stars	2 Michelin stars	1 Michelin star	1 Michelin star	1 Michelin star	1 Michelin star	1 Michelin star	1 Michelin star
Akrame	Hong Kong	Ship Street	—	—	—	—	—	—	1 Michelin star	1 Michelin star	1 Michelin star	1 Michelin star	—	—
Arcane	Hong Kong	On Lan Street, Central	—	—	—	—	—	—	—	—	—	1 Michelin star	1 Michelin star	1 Michelin star
Alain Ducasse at Morpheus	Macau	City of Dreams	—	—	—	—	—	—	—	—	—	—	2 Michelin stars	2 Michelin stars
Amber	Hong Kong	The Landmark, Mandarin Oriental	2 Michelin stars	2 Michelin stars	2 Michelin stars	2 Michelin stars	2 Michelin stars	2 Michelin stars	2 Michelin stars	2 Michelin stars	2 Michelin stars	2 Michelin stars	2 Michelin stars	2 Michelin stars
Arbor	Hong Kong	Central	—	—	—	—	—	—	—	—	—	—	1 Michelin star	2 Michelin stars
Aurora	Macau	Altira Macau	—	1 Michelin star	1 Michelin star	—	—	—	—	—	—	—	1 Michelin star	—
Beefbar	Hong Kong	Club Lusitano	—	—	—	—	—	—	—	—	1 Michelin star	1 Michelin star	1 Michelin star	1 Michelin star
BELON	Hong Kong	Elgin Street	—	—	—	—	—	—	—	—	—	—	1 Michelin star	1 Michelin star
Bo Innovation	Hong Kong	J Residence, Wan Chai	2 Michelin stars	1 Michelin star	1 Michelin star	2 Michelin stars	2 Michelin stars	3 Michelin stars	3 Michelin stars	3 Michelin stars	3 Michelin stars	3 Michelin stars	3 Michelin stars	2 Michelin stars
The Boss	Hong Kong	Peter Building, Queen's Road Central	—	—	—	—	—	1 Michelin star	1 Michelin star	1 Michelin star	Closed			
Cafe Gray Deluxe	Hong Kong	Pacific Place	—	—	1 Michelin star	—	—	—	—	—	—	—	—	—
Caprice	Hong Kong	Four Seasons Hotel Hong Kong	2 Michelin stars	3 Michelin stars	3 Michelin stars	3 Michelin stars	3 Michelin stars	2 Michelin stars	2 Michelin stars	2 Michelin stars	2 Michelin stars	2 Michelin stars	3 Michelin stars	3 Michelin stars
Cépage	Hong Kong	Wing Fung Street	—	1 Michelin star	1 Michelin star	1 Michelin star	1 Michelin star	Closed						
Celebrity Cuisine	Hong Kong	Kau U Fong	—	1 Michelin star	2 Michelin stars	2 Michelin stars	2 Michelin stars	2 Michelin stars	2 Michelin stars	2 Michelin stars	1 Michelin star	1 Michelin star	1 Michelin star	1 Michelin star
Chili Fagara	Hong Kong	Graham Street	—	—	1 Michelin star	1 Michelin star	1 Michelin star	—	—	—	—	—	Closed	
CIAK - In The Kitchen	Hong Kong	Landmark	—	—	—	—	—	—	1 Michelin star	1 Michelin star	1 Michelin star	—	—	—
Cuisine Cuisine	Hong Kong	Central	—	—	—	1 Michelin star	1 Michelin star	—	—	—	—	—	—	—
Cuisine Cuisine	Hong Kong	Tsim Sha Tsui	—	—	2 Michelin stars	1 Michelin star	1 Michelin star	—	—	—	—	—	—	—
Din Tai Fung	Hong Kong	Causeway Bay	—	—	1 Michelin star	—	—	—	—	—	—	—	—	—
Din Tai Fung	Hong Kong	Silvercord (Tsim Sha Tsui) branch	—	1 Michelin star	1 Michelin star	1 Michelin star	1 Michelin star	1 Michelin star	—	—	—	—	—	—
Dong Lai Shun	Hong Kong	Tsim Sha Tsui	—	—	—	—	1 Michelin star	—	—	—	—	—	—	—
The Drawing Room	Hong Kong	Causeway Bay	—	1 Michelin star	—	—	—	Closed						
Duddell's	Hong Kong	Shanghai Tang Mansion	—	—	—	—	—	1 Michelin star	2 Michelin stars	2 Michelin stars	2 Michelin stars	1 Michelin star	1 Michelin star	1 Michelin star
Dynasty Restaurant	Hong Kong	Wanchai	—	1 Michelin star	1 Michelin star	1 Michelin star	—	—	—	—	—	—	—	—
Ecriture	Hong Kong	Central	—	—	—	—	—	—	—	—	—	—	2 Michelin stars	2 Michelin stars
The Eight	Macau	Casino Lisboa	1 Michelin star	1 Michelin star	2 Michelin stars	2 Michelin stars	2 Michelin stars	3 Michelin stars	3 Michelin stars	3 Michelin stars	3 Michelin stars	3 Michelin stars	3 Michelin stars	3 Michelin stars
ÉPURE	Hong Kong	Harbour City	—	—	—	—	—	—	—	—	1 Michelin star	1 Michelin star	1 Michelin star	1 Michelin star
Farm House Chinese Restaurant	Hong Kong	Causeway Bay	—	1 Michelin star	1 Michelin star	—	—	—	—	—	—	—	—	—
Feng Wei Ju	Macau	StarWorld Macau Hotel	—	—	—	—	—	—	—	1 Michelin star	2 Michelin stars	2 Michelin stars	2 Michelin stars	2 Michelin stars
Fook Lam Moon	Hong Kong	Tsim Sha Tsui branch	—	1 Michelin star	1 Michelin star	1 Michelin star	1 Michelin star	1 Michelin star	—	—	—	—	—	—
Fook Lam Moon	Hong Kong	Wan Chai branch	1 Michelin star	2 Michelin stars	1 Michelin star	1 Michelin star	1 Michelin star	1 Michelin star	1 Michelin star	1 Michelin star	—	—	—	—
Forum Restaurant	Hong Kong	Sino Plaza	1 Michelin star	1 Michelin star	1 Michelin star	1 Michelin star	1 Michelin star	—	1 Michelin star	2 Michelin stars	2 Michelin stars	2 Michelin stars	2 Michelin stars	3 Michelin stars
Fu Ho	Hong Kong	Tsim Sha Tsui branch	—	—	1 Michelin star	1 Michelin star	1 Michelin star	1 Michelin star	1 Michelin star	1 Michelin star	1 Michelin star	1 Michelin star	1 Michelin star	1 Michelin star
Fung Lum Restaurant	Hong Kong	Tai Wai	—	—	1 Michelin star	—	—	—	—	—	Closed			
Gaddi's	Hong Kong	Peninsula Hotel	—	—	—	—	—	—	—	—	—	—	—	1 Michelin star
Gold by Harlan Goldstein	Hong Kong	LKF Tower	—	—	—	—	1 Michelin star	1 Michelin star	—	Closed				
Golden Flower	Macau	Wynn Macau	—	—	—	1 Michelin star	2 Michelin stars	2 Michelin stars	2 Michelin stars	2 Michelin stars	2 Michelin stars	2 Michelin stars	2 Michelin stars	2 Michelin stars
The Golden Leaf	Hong Kong	Conrad Hotel	1 Michelin star	1 Michelin star	1 Michelin star	—	—	1 Michelin star	1 Michelin star	1 Michelin star	—	—	—	—
The Golden Peacock	Macau	The Venetian Macao	—	—	—	—	—	1 Michelin star	1 Michelin star	1 Michelin star	1 Michelin star	1 Michelin star	1 Michelin star	1 Michelin star
Golden Valley	Hong Kong	Emperor (Happy Valley) Hotel	—	—	1 Michelin star	1 Michelin star	1 Michelin star	1 Michelin star	1 Michelin star	1 Michelin star	1 Michelin star	—	—	—
Guo Fu Lou	Hong Kong	Empire Hotel Hong Kong	—	—	—	—	1 Michelin star	1 Michelin star	1 Michelin star	1 Michelin star	1 Michelin star	1 Michelin star	1 Michelin star	1 Michelin star
Hin Ho Curry Restaurant	Hong Kong	Shau Kei Wan	—	—	1 Michelin star	1 Michelin star	—	—	—	Closed				
Ho Hung Kee	Hong Kong	Hysan Place	—	—	1 Michelin star	1 Michelin star	1 Michelin star	—	1 Michelin star	1 Michelin star	1 Michelin star	1 Michelin star	1 Michelin star	1 Michelin star
Hoi King Heen	Hong Kong	Tsim Sha Tsui	—	—	1 Michelin star	1 Michelin star	1 Michelin star	—	—	—	—	—	—	—
Hong Zhou	Hong Kong	Chinachem Johnston Plaza, Johnston Road	—	1 Michelin star	1 Michelin star	1 Michelin star	1 Michelin star	1 Michelin star	—	—	—	—	—	—
Hung's Delicacies (阿鴻小吃)	Hong Kong	Hung To Road, Kwun Tong	—	1 Michelin star	1 Michelin star	1 Michelin star	1 Michelin star	1 Michelin star	—	—	—	—	—	—
Hutong	Hong Kong	Peking Road	1 Michelin star	1 Michelin star	—	—	—	—	—	—	—	—	—	—
I M Teppanyaki & Wine	Hong Kong	Tung Lo Wan Road	—	—	—	—	—	—	—	—	1 Michelin star	1 Michelin star	1 Michelin star	1 Michelin star
Il Milione	Hong Kong	Hutchison House, Harcourt Road	—	—	—	—	—	1 Michelin star	Closed					
Imperial Court	Macau	MGM Macau	1 Michelin star	—	—	—	—	—	—	—	—	—	—	—
Imperial Treasure Fine Chinese Cuisine	Hong Kong	Peking Road, Tsim Sha Tsui	—	—	—	—	—	—	—	—	—	—	1 Michelin star	1 Michelin star
Island Tang	Hong Kong	The Gallerlia Plaza	—	1 Michelin star	1 Michelin star	1 Michelin star	—	—	—	—	Closed			
Jade Dragon	Macau	City of Dreams	—	—	—	—	—	1 Michelin star	1 Michelin star	2 Michelin stars	2 Michelin stars	2 Michelin stars	3 Michelin stars	3 Michelin stars
Jardin de Jade	Hong Kong	Sun Hung Kai Centre	—	—	—	—	1 Michelin star	1 Michelin star	1 Michelin star	1 Michelin star	1 Michelin star	1 Michelin star	1 Michelin star	1 Michelin star
Jardin de Jade	Macau	StarWorld Macau Hotel	—	1 Michelin star	1 Michelin star	—	—	—	—	—	—	—	—	—
Kaiseki Den by Saotome	Hong Kong	Wan Chai	—	—	—	—	—	—	—	—	—	1 Michelin star	1 Michelin star	1 Michelin star
Kam's Roast Goose	Hong Kong	Po Wah Commercial Centre	—	—	—	—	—	—	1 Michelin star	1 Michelin star	1 Michelin star	1 Michelin star	1 Michelin star	1 Michelin star
Kashiwaya Hong Kong	Hong Kong	On Lan Street, Central	—	—	—	—	—	—	—	—	2 Michelin stars	2 Michelin stars	2 Michelin stars	2 Michelin stars
Kazuo Okada	Hong Kong	The Harbourfront Landmark	—	—	—	—	—	—	1 Michelin star	1 Michelin star	Closed			
Kin's Kitchen	Hong Kong	Tin Hau	—	—	1 Michelin star	—	—	Closed						
King	Macau	AIA Tower, Avenida Comercial de Macau	—	—	—	—	—	1 Michelin star	1 Michelin star	1 Michelin star	1 Michelin star	1 Michelin star	1 Michelin star	1 Michelin star
The Kitchen	Macau	Grand Lisboa	—	—	—	—	—	1 Michelin star	1 Michelin star	1 Michelin star	1 Michelin star	1 Michelin star	1 Michelin star	1 Michelin star
L'Altro	Hong Kong	L Place, Queen's Road Central	—	—	—	—	1 Michelin star	1 Michelin star	—	—	—	Closed		
L'Envol	Hong Kong	St. Regis Hong Kong	—	—	—	—	—	—	—	—	—	—	—	1 Michelin star
L'Atelier de Joël Robuchon	Hong Kong	Landmark	2 Michelin stars	2 Michelin stars	2 Michelin stars	3 Michelin stars	3 Michelin stars	3 Michelin stars	3 Michelin stars	3 Michelin stars	3 Michelin stars	3 Michelin stars	3 Michelin stars	3 Michelin stars
Lai Heen	Macau	Galaxy Macau	—	—	—	—	—	—	—	—	1 Michelin star	1 Michelin star	1 Michelin star	1 Michelin star
Lee Bistro	Hong Kong	Causeway Bay	—	—	1 Michelin star	—	—	—	—	—	—	—	—	Closed
Lei Garden	Hong Kong	apm (Kwun Tong) branch	—	—	—	—	—	—	—	—	1 Michelin star	1 Michelin star	1 Michelin star	1 Michelin star
Lei Garden	Hong Kong	City Garden (North Point) branch	—	1 Michelin star	1 Michelin star	1 Michelin star	1 Michelin star	1 Michelin star	1 Michelin star	1 Michelin star	1 Michelin star	1 Michelin star	—	—
Lei Garden	Hong Kong	CNT Tower (Wan Chai) branch	—	—	1 Michelin star	1 Michelin star	1 Michelin star	1 Michelin star	1 Michelin star	1 Michelin star	—	—	—	—
Lei Garden	Hong Kong	Elements (Tsim Sha Tsui) branch	1 Michelin star	1 Michelin star	—	1 Michelin star	—	—	—	—	—	—	—	—
Lei Garden	Hong Kong	International Finance Centre (Central) branch	1 Michelin star	—	1 Michelin star	1 Michelin star	1 Michelin star	1 Michelin star	1 Michelin star	1 Michelin star	—	—	—	—
Lei Garden	Hong Kong	Matheson Street, Causeway Bay branch	—	—	—	1 Michelin star	—	—	—	—	—	—	—	—
Lei Garden	Hong Kong	Mody Street, Tsim Sha Tsui branch	—	1 Michelin star	1 Michelin star	1 Michelin star	—	—	—	—	—	—	—	—
Lei Garden	Hong Kong	New Town Plaza (Sha Tin)branch	—	—	1 Michelin star	1 Michelin star	1 Michelin star	1 Michelin star	1 Michelin star	1 Michelin star	—	—	—	—
Lei Garden	Hong Kong	Sai Yee Street (Mong Kok) branch	—	1 Michelin star	1 Michelin star	2 Michelin stars	1 Michelin star	1 Michelin star	1 Michelin star	1 Michelin star	1 Michelin star	1 Michelin star	1 Michelin star	1 Michelin star
Lei Garden	Hong Kong	Telford Plaza (Kowloon Bay) branch	—	—	1 Michelin star	1 Michelin star	1 Michelin star	1 Michelin star	1 Michelin star	1 Michelin star	—	—	—	—
Lei Garden	Macau	The Venetian Macao	—	1 Michelin star	1 Michelin star	1 Michelin star	—	—	—	—	—	—	—	—
Liu Yuan Pavilion	Hong Kong	Wan Chai	—	—	—	—	—	—	—	—	—	—	—	1 Michelin star
Loaf On	Hong Kong	Sai Kung Town	—	1 Michelin star	1 Michelin star	1 Michelin star	1 Michelin star	1 Michelin star	1 Michelin star	1 Michelin star	1 Michelin star	1 Michelin star	1 Michelin star	1 Michelin star
Louise	Hong Kong	PMQ Square	—	—	—	—	—	—	—	—	—	—	—	1 Michelin star
Lung King Heen	Hong Kong	Four Seasons Hotel	3 Michelin stars	3 Michelin stars	3 Michelin stars	3 Michelin stars	3 Michelin stars	3 Michelin stars	3 Michelin stars	3 Michelin stars	3 Michelin stars	3 Michelin stars	3 Michelin stars	3 Michelin stars
Man Wah	Hong Kong	Mandarin Oriental, Hong Kong	—	—	—	1 Michelin star	—	1 Michelin star	1 Michelin star	1 Michelin star	1 Michelin star	1 Michelin star	1 Michelin star	1 Michelin star
The Mandarin Grill + Bar	Hong Kong	Mandarin Oriental, Hong Kong	—	1 Michelin star	1 Michelin star	1 Michelin star	1 Michelin star	1 Michelin star	1 Michelin star	1 Michelin star	1 Michelin star	1 Michelin star	1 Michelin star	1 Michelin star
MIC Kitchen	Hong Kong	Landmark	—	—	—	—	—	1 Michelin star	1 Michelin star	1 Michelin star	1 Michelin star	1 Michelin star	—	—
MIST	Hong Kong	Causeway Bay	—	—	1 Michelin star	1 Michelin star	Closed							
Ming Court	Hong Kong	Langham Place	1 Michelin star	2 Michelin stars	2 Michelin stars	2 Michelin stars	2 Michelin stars	1 Michelin star	1 Michelin star	2 Michelin stars	2 Michelin stars	1 Michelin star	1 Michelin star	1 Michelin star
Mirror Restaurant	Hong Kong	Tiffan Tower, Wan Chai Road	—	—	—	1 Michelin star	—	1 Michelin star	Closed					
Mizumi	Macau	Wynn Macau	—	—	—	—	—	—	—	1 Michelin star	2 Michelin stars	2 Michelin stars	2 Michelin stars	2 Michelin stars
Morton's of Chicago	Hong Kong	Sheraton Hotel	—	1 Michelin star	—	—	—	—	—	—	—	—	—	—
Nanhai No.1	Hong Kong	Tsim Sha Tsui	—	—	1 Michelin star	1 Michelin star	—	—	—	—	—	—	—	—
New Punjab Club	Hong Kong	Wyndham Street, Central	—	—	—	—	—	—	—	—	—	—	1 Michelin star	1 Michelin star
NUR	Hong Kong	Lyndhurst Tower	—	—	—	—	—	—	1 Michelin star	—	Closed			
The Ocean by Olivier Bellin	Hong Kong	Repulse Bay	—	—	—	—	—	—	—	—	—	1 Michelin star	1 Michelin star	Closed
Octavium	Hong Kong	Central	—	—	—	—	—	—	—	—	—	—	1 Michelin star	1 Michelin star
ON Dining	Hong Kong	On Lan Street, Central	—	—	—	—	—	—	—	1 Michelin star	1 Michelin star	1 Michelin star	Closed	
One Dim Sum	Hong Kong	Tung Choi Street	—	—	1 Michelin star	1 Michelin star	—	—	—	—	—	—	—	—
Pang's Kitchen	Hong Kong	Yik Yam Street	—	—	—	—	1 Michelin star	1 Michelin star	1 Michelin star	1 Michelin star	1 Michelin star	1 Michelin star	1 Michelin star	1 Michelin star
Pearl Dragon	Macau	Studio City	—	—	—	—	—	—	—	—	1 Michelin star	1 Michelin star	1 Michelin star	1 Michelin star
Peking Garden	Hong Kong	Alexandra House (Central) branch	—	—	—	—	—	—	—	1 Michelin star	1 Michelin star	1 Michelin star	—	—
Petrus	Hong Kong	Island Shangri-La	1 Michelin star	2 Michelin stars	1 Michelin star	1 Michelin star	—	1 Michelin star	—	—	—	—	—	1 Michelin star
Pierre	Hong Kong	Mandarin Oriental, Hong Kong	1 Michelin star	2 Michelin stars	2 Michelin stars	2 Michelin stars	1 Michelin star	2 Michelin stars	2 Michelin stars	2 Michelin stars	2 Michelin stars	2 Michelin stars	2 Michelin stars	2 Michelin stars
The Principal	Hong Kong	Star Street	—	—	—	—	1 Michelin star	1 Michelin star	2 Michelin stars	Closed				
Qi - House of Sichuan	Hong Kong	J Senses, (Wan Chai) branch	—	—	—	—	—	—	—	—	1 Michelin star	1 Michelin star	1 Michelin star	—
Regal Palace	Hong Kong	Regal Hongkong Hotel	1 Michelin star	1 Michelin star	1 Michelin star	—	—	—	—	—	—	—	—	—
Rech by Alain Ducasse	Hong Kong	InterContinental Hong Kong	—	—	—	—	—	—	—	—	—	1 Michelin star	1 Michelin star	1 Michelin star
Ristorante il Teatro	Macau	Wynn Macau	—	—	1 Michelin star	—	—	—	—	—	—	—	—	—
Roganic	Hong Kong	Causeway Bay	—	—	—	—	—	—	—	—	—	—	—	1 Michelin star
Rùn	Hong Kong	Wan Chai	—	—	—	—	—	—	—	—	—	—	—	1 Michelin star
Robuchon au Dôme (Note: The restaurant was formerly Robuchon á Galera)	Macau	Casino Lisboa, Grand Lisboa	3 Michelin stars	3 Michelin stars	3 Michelin stars	3 Michelin stars	3 Michelin stars	3 Michelin stars	3 Michelin stars	3 Michelin stars	3 Michelin stars	3 Michelin stars	3 Michelin stars	3 Michelin stars
Ryota Kappou Modern	Hong Kong	On Lan Street, Central	—	—	—	—	—	—	—	—	—	—	—	1 Michelin star
Seasons by Olivier Elzer	Hong Kong	Lee Garden Two	—	—	—	—	—	—	1 Michelin star	1 Michelin star	1 Michelin star	—	Closed	
Serge et le Phoque	Hong Kong	Tower 1, The Zenith	—	—	—	—	—	—	—	1 Michelin star	1 Michelin star	1 Michelin star	—	—
Shang Palace	Hong Kong	Kowloon Shangri-La	2 Michelin stars	2 Michelin stars	1 Michelin star	2 Michelin stars	2 Michelin stars	2 Michelin stars	2 Michelin stars	2 Michelin stars	2 Michelin stars	2 Michelin stars	1 Michelin star	1 Michelin star
Shanghai Garden Restaurant	Hong Kong	Harcourt Road, Admiralty	1 Michelin star	—	—	—	—	—	—	—	—	—	—	—
Shinji by Kanesaka	Macau	City of Dreams	—	—	—	—	—	—	—	1 Michelin star	1 Michelin star	1 Michelin star	1 Michelin star	1 Michelin star
Sichuan Moon	Macau	Wynn Palace	—	—	—	—	—	—	—	—	—	—	—	2 Michelin stars
Sing Kee Seafood Restaurant	Hong Kong	Sai Kung Tai Street (Sai Kung) branch	—	—	—	—	—	1 Michelin star	1 Michelin star	1 Michelin star	1 Michelin star	1 Michelin star	—	—
Spoon by Alain Ducasse	Hong Kong	InterContinental Hong Kong	—	—	1 Michelin star	2 Michelin stars	2 Michelin stars	2 Michelin stars	1 Michelin star	1 Michelin star	Closed			
Spring Moon	Hong Kong	Peninsula Hotel	—	—	—	—	—	—	—	—	1 Michelin star	1 Michelin star	1 Michelin star	1 Michelin star
The Square	Hong Kong	Exchange Square	1 Michelin star	1 Michelin star	1 Michelin star	1 Michelin star	1 Michelin star	1 Michelin star	1 Michelin star	—	—	—	—	—
St. George	Hong Kong	1881 Heritage	—	—	—	1 Michelin star	—	—	—	—	—	Closed		
The Steak House Wine bar + grill	Hong Kong	InterContinental Hong Kong	—	—	—	—	1 Michelin star	1 Michelin star	1 Michelin star	1 Michelin star	—	—	—	—
Strip House by Harlan Goldstein	Hong Kong	Lan Kwai Fong	—	—	—	—	1 Michelin star	Closed						
Summer Palace	Hong Kong	Island Shangri-La	2 Michelin stars	1 Michelin star	1 Michelin star	1 Michelin star	2 Michelin stars	2 Michelin stars	2 Michelin stars	2 Michelin stars	2 Michelin stars	1 Michelin star	1 Michelin star	1 Michelin star
Sun Tung Lok	Hong Kong	Tsim Sha Tsui branch	—	—	3 Michelin stars	2 Michelin stars	2 Michelin stars	2 Michelin stars	2 Michelin stars	2 Michelin stars	2 Michelin stars	2 Michelin stars	2 Michelin stars	2 Michelin stars
Sushi Shikon (formerly Sushi Yoshitake)	Hong Kong	Jervois Street	—	—	—	—	2 Michelin stars	3 Michelin stars	3 Michelin stars	3 Michelin stars	3 Michelin stars	3 Michelin stars	3 Michelin stars	3 Michelin stars
Suchi Saito	Hong Kong	Four Seasons Hotel	—	—	—	—	—	—	—	—	—	—	2 Michelin stars	2 Michelin stars
Sushi Tokami	Hong Kong	Harbour City	—	—	—	—	—	—	—	—	1 Michelin star	1 Michelin star	1 Michelin star	—
Sushi Wadatsumi (formerly Sushi Ginza Iwa)	Hong Kong	Grand Millennium Plaza	—	—	—	—	—	—	1 Michelin star	—	1 Michelin star	1 Michelin star	1 Michelin star	1 Michelin star
T'ang Court	Hong Kong	Langham Place	2 Michelin stars	2 Michelin stars	2 Michelin stars	1 Michelin star	1 Michelin star	2 Michelin stars	2 Michelin stars	3 Michelin stars	3 Michelin stars	3 Michelin stars	3 Michelin stars	3 Michelin stars
Ta Vie	Hong Kong	The Pottinger Hong Kong	—	—	—	—	—	—	—	1 Michelin star	2 Michelin stars	2 Michelin stars	2 Michelin stars	2 Michelin stars
The Chairman	Hong Kong	Kau U Fong	—	—	—	1 Michelin star	—	—	—	—	—	—	—	—
Takumi by Daisuke Mori (formerly Wagyu Takumi	Hong Kong	Wan Chai	—	—	—	—	—	—	—	—	—	1 Michelin star	1 Michelin star	1 Michelin star
The Tasting Room	Macau	City of Dreams	—	—	—	—	1 Michelin star	1 Michelin star	1 Michelin star	2 Michelin stars	2 Michelin stars	2 Michelin stars	2 Michelin stars	2 Michelin stars
Tate Dining Room & Bar	Hong Kong	Hollywood Road	—	—	—	—	1 Michelin star	1 Michelin star	1 Michelin star	1 Michelin star	1 Michelin star	1 Michelin star	1 Michelin star	1 Michelin star
Tenku RyuGin	Hong Kong	International Commerce Centre	—	—	—	—	2 Michelin stars	2 Michelin stars	2 Michelin stars	2 Michelin stars	2 Michelin stars	2 Michelin stars	2 Michelin stars	2 Michelin stars
Terrazza	Macau	Galaxy Macau	—	—	—	—	—	—	—	1 Michelin star	1 Michelin star	—	—	—
Tim's Kitchen	Hong Kong	Bonham Strand	1 Michelin star	2 Michelin stars	2 Michelin stars	1 Michelin star	1 Michelin star	1 Michelin star	—	—	—	—	—	Closed
Tim's Kitchen	Macau	Casino Lisboa	2 Michelin stars	1 Michelin star	2 Michelin stars	1 Michelin star	1 Michelin star	1 Michelin star	1 Michelin star	1 Michelin star	1 Michelin star	1 Michelin star	1 Michelin star	1 Michelin star
Tim Ho Wan	Hong Kong	Mong Kok branch	—	1 Michelin star	1 Michelin star	1 Michelin star	1 Michelin star	Moved						
Tim Ho Wan	Hong Kong	North Point branch	—	—	—	—	—	1 Michelin star	1 Michelin star	1 Michelin star	1 Michelin star	—	—	—
Tim Ho Wan	Hong Kong	Sham Shui Po branch	—	—	1 Michelin star	1 Michelin star	1 Michelin star	1 Michelin star	1 Michelin star	1 Michelin star	1 Michelin star	1 Michelin star	1 Michelin star	1 Michelin star
Tim Ho Wan	Hong Kong	Olympian City 2 (Tai Kok Tsui) branch	—	—	—	—	—	—	1 Michelin star	—	—	—	—	—
Tin Lung Heen	Hong Kong	International Commerce Centre	—	—	—	1 Michelin star	2 Michelin stars	2 Michelin stars	2 Michelin stars	2 Michelin stars	2 Michelin stars	2 Michelin stars	2 Michelin stars	2 Michelin stars
Tosca	Hong Kong	Ritz-Carlton	—	—	—	—	—	1 Michelin star	1 Michelin star	1 Michelin star	1 Michelin star	1 Michelin star	1 Michelin star	1 Michelin star
Tung Yee Heen	Macau	Mandarin Oriental, Macau	1 Michelin star	1 Michelin star	—	—	—	—	—	—	—	—	—	—
Upper Modern Bistro	Hong Kong	Elegance Court, Sheung Wan	—	—	—	—	—	—	1 Michelin star	—	—	—	—	Closed
VEA Restaurant and Lounge	Hong Kong	The Wellington, Wellington Street	—	—	—	—	—	—	—	—	1 Michelin star	1 Michelin star	1 Michelin star	1 Michelin star
Wagyu Kaiseki Den	Hong Kong	Hollywood Road	—	1 Michelin star	1 Michelin star	1 Michelin star	1 Michelin star	1 Michelin star	1 Michelin star	1 Michelin star	1 Michelin star	—	—	—
Wagyu Takumi	Hong Kong	The Oakhill, Wood Road	—	—	—	—	—	2 Michelin stars	2 Michelin stars	2 Michelin stars	1 Michelin star	Closed		
Wing Lei	Macau	Wynn Macau	—	1 Michelin star	1 Michelin star	2 Michelin stars	2 Michelin stars	1 Michelin star	1 Michelin star	1 Michelin star	1 Michelin star	1 Michelin star	1 Michelin star	2 Michelin stars
Xin Dau Ji	Hong Kong	Jordan branch	—	—	—	1 Michelin star	1 Michelin star	—	—	—	—	—	—	—
XinRongJi	Hong Kong	Wan Chai	—	—	—	—	—	—	—	—	—	—	1 Michelin star	1 Michelin star
Yan Toh Heen	Hong Kong	InterContinental Hong Kong	—	1 Michelin star	1 Michelin star	1 Michelin star	1 Michelin star	1 Michelin star	2 Michelin stars	2 Michelin stars	2 Michelin stars	2 Michelin stars	2 Michelin stars	1 Michelin star
Yat Tung Heen	Hong Kong	Wan Chai branch	—	1 Michelin star	1 Michelin star	1 Michelin star	—	—	—	—	—	—	—	—
Yat Tung Heen	Hong Kong	Jordan branch	—	—	—	—	—	—	—	—	1 Michelin star	1 Michelin star	1 Michelin star	1 Michelin star
Yee Tung Heen	Hong Kong	The Excelsior Hong Kong	—	—	—	—	—	—	—	—	—	1 Michelin star	1 Michelin star	Closed
Yat Lok	Hong Kong	Conwell House, Stanley Street	—	—	—	—	—	—	1 Michelin star	1 Michelin star	1 Michelin star	1 Michelin star	1 Michelin star	1 Michelin star
Ye Shanghai	Hong Kong	Marco Polo Hotel (Tsim Sha Tsui) branch	—	1 Michelin star	1 Michelin star	2 Michelin stars	2 Michelin stars	1 Michelin star	1 Michelin star	1 Michelin star	1 Michelin star	1 Michelin star	1 Michelin star	1 Michelin star
Ying Chinese Restaurant	Macau	Altira Macau (formerly Crown Macau)	1 Michelin star	—	—	—	—	—	—	—	1 Michelin star	1 Michelin star	1 Michelin star	1 Michelin star
Ying Jee Club	Hong Kong	Connaught Road Central	—	—	—	—	—	—	—	—	—	1 Michelin star	2 Michelin stars	2 Michelin stars
Yu Lei	Hong Kong	The Harbourfront Landmark	—	—	—	—	1 Michelin star	1 Michelin star	1 Michelin star	1 Michelin star	Closed			
Yue	Hong Kong	City Garden Hotel	—	—	—	1 Michelin star	1 Michelin star	1 Michelin star	1 Michelin star	1 Michelin star	—	—	—	—
Yung Kee	Hong Kong	Wellington Street	1 Michelin star	1 Michelin star	1 Michelin star	—	—	—	—	—	—	—	—	—
Zest by Konishi	Hong Kong	18 On Lan St	—	—	—	—	—	—	—	—	—	—	—	1 Michelin star
Zhejiang Heen	Hong Kong	Kiu Fu Commercial Building, Lockhart Road	—	—	—	—	1 Michelin star	1 Michelin star	1 Michelin star	1 Michelin star	1 Michelin star	1 Michelin star	1 Michelin star	1 Michelin star
Zi Yat Heen	Macau	Four Seasons Hotel Macau	—	2 Michelin stars	2 Michelin stars	2 Michelin stars	2 Michelin stars	2 Michelin stars	2 Michelin stars	2 Michelin stars	1 Michelin star	1 Michelin star	1 Michelin star	1 Michelin star
References														

== See also ==
- List of restaurants in Hong Kong
- List of Michelin 3-star restaurants
- List of Michelin 3-star restaurants in Hong Kong and Macau
- Lists of Michelin-starred restaurants

== Bibliography ==
- Michelin Guide Hong Kong & Macau. Michelin Travel Publications. 2009. ISBN 978-2-06-714045-5.
- Michelin Guide Hong Kong & Macau. Michelin Travel Publications. 2010. ISBN 978-2-06-714517-7.
- Michelin Guide Hong Kong & Macau. Michelin Travel Publications. 2011. ISBN 978-2-06-715354-7.
- Michelin Guide Hong Kong & Macau. Michelin Travel Publications. 2012. ISBN 978-2-06-716978-4.
- Michelin Guide Hong Kong & Macau. Michelin Travel Publications. 2013. ISBN 978-2-06-717982-0.
- Michelin Guide Hong Kong & Macau. Michelin Travel Publications. 2014. ISBN 978-2-06-718911-9.
- Michelin Guide Hong Kong & Macau. Michelin Travel Publications. 2016. ISBN 978-2-06-720642-7.
- Michelin Guide Hong Kong & Macau. Michelin Travel Publications. 2017. ISBN 978-2-06-721501-6.
- Michelin Guide Hong Kong & Macau. Michelin Travel Publications. 2018. ISBN 978-2-06-722364-6.
- Michelin Guide Hong Kong & Macau. Michelin Travel Publications. 2020. ISBN 978-2-06-724245-6.
- Michelin Guide Hong Kong & Macau. Michelin Travel Publications. 2021. ISBN 978-2-06-725050-5.
