= List of Michelin 3-star restaurants in Hong Kong and Macau =

This article contains a complete list of Michelin 3-star restaurants in Hong Kong & Macau. Michelin stars are a rating system used by the red Michelin Guide to grade restaurants on their quality. The guide was originally developed in 1900 to show French drivers where local amenities such as restaurants and mechanics were. The rating system was first introduced in 1926 as a single star, with the second and third stars introduced in 1933. According to the Guide, one star signifies "a very good restaurant", two stars are "excellent cooking that is worth a detour", and three stars mean "exceptional cuisine that is worth a special journey". The listing of starred restaurants is updated once per year.

The Michelin Guide began reviewing restaurants in Hong Kong & Macau in 2009.

As of the 2026 Michelin Guide, there are 9 restaurants in Hong Kong & Macau with a rating of 3 Michelin stars.

== List of Michelin 3-star restaurants ==
Key
1 Michelin star	One Michelin star
2 Michelin stars	Two Michelin stars
3 Michelin stars	Three Michelin stars
—	The restaurant did not receive a star that year

Michelin 3-star restaurants
Restaurant	Chef	Cuisine	Location	Current	Year to star			Ref.
Restaurant	Chef	Cuisine	Location	Current	1 Michelin star	2 Michelin stars	3 Michelin stars	Ref.
8 1/2 Otto e Mezzo Bombana	Umberto Bombana	Italian	Hong Kong	3 Michelin stars	—	2011	2012–present	
Amber	Richard Ekkebus	French	Hong Kong	3 Michelin stars	—	2009–2024	2025–present	
Bo Innovation	Alvin Leung	French	Hong Kong	2 Michelin stars	2010–2011	2009, 2012–2013; 2020–present	2014–2019	
Caprice	Guillume Galliot	French	Hong Kong	3 Michelin stars	—	2014–2018	2010–2013; 2019–present	
The Eight	Albert Au	Cantonese	Macau	2 Michelin stars	2009–2010	2011–2013; 2024–present	2014–2023	
Forum Restaurant	Yeung Koon Yat	Cantonese	Hong Kong	3 Michelin stars	2009–2013, 2015	2016–2019	2020–present	
Jade Dragon	Kelvin Au Yeung	Cantonese	Macau	3 Michelin stars	2014–2015	2016–2018	2019–present	
L'Atelier de Joël Robuchon	Julien Tongourian	French	Hong Kong	2 Michelin stars	—	2009–2011; 2026	2012–2024	
Lung King Heen	Chan Yan-tak	Cantonese	Hong Kong	2 Michelin stars	—	2023–present	2009–2022	
Robuchon au Dôme (Note: The restaurant was formerly Robuchon á Galera)	Julien Tongourian	French	Macau	3 Michelin stars	—	—	2009–present	
Sun Tung Lok	Joe Chan	Cantonese	Hong Kong	1 Michelin star	2024–present	2013–2023	2012	
Sushi Shikon	Masahiro Yoshitake	Japanese	Hong Kong	3 Michelin stars	—	2013	2014–present	
T'ang Court	Kwong Wai Keung	Cantonese	Hong Kong	3 Michelin stars	2012–2013	2009–2011; 2014–2015	2016–present	
Ta Vie	Hideaki Sato	Innovative	Hong Kong	3 Michelin stars	2016	2017–2022	2023–present	

== See also ==
- Cuisine of Hong Kong
- List of Michelin 3-star restaurants
- List of Michelin-starred restaurants in Hong Kong and Macau
- List of restaurants in Hong Kong

== Bibliography ==
- Michelin Guide Hong Kong & Macau. Michelin Travel Publications. 2009. ISBN 978-2-06-714045-5.
- Michelin Guide Hong Kong & Macau. Michelin Travel Publications. 2010. ISBN 978-2-06-714517-7.
- Michelin Guide Hong Kong & Macau. Michelin Travel Publications. 2011. ISBN 978-2-06-715354-7.
- Michelin Guide Hong Kong & Macau. Michelin Travel Publications. 2012. ISBN 978-2-06-716978-4.
- Michelin Guide Hong Kong & Macau. Michelin Travel Publications. 2013. ISBN 978-2-06-717982-0.
- Michelin Guide Hong Kong & Macau. Michelin Travel Publications. 2014. ISBN 978-2-06-718911-9.
- Michelin Guide Hong Kong & Macau. Michelin Travel Publications. 2016. ISBN 978-2-06-720642-7.
- Michelin Guide Hong Kong & Macau. Michelin Travel Publications. 2017. ISBN 978-2-06-721501-6.
- Michelin Guide Hong Kong & Macau. Michelin Travel Publications. 2018. ISBN 978-2-06-722364-6.
- Michelin Guide Hong Kong & Macau. Michelin Travel Publications. 2020. ISBN 978-2-06-724245-6.
- Michelin Guide Hong Kong & Macau. Michelin Travel Publications. 2021. ISBN 978-2-06-725050-5.
