= Robuchon au Dôme =

3 Michelin Star restaurant in Macau

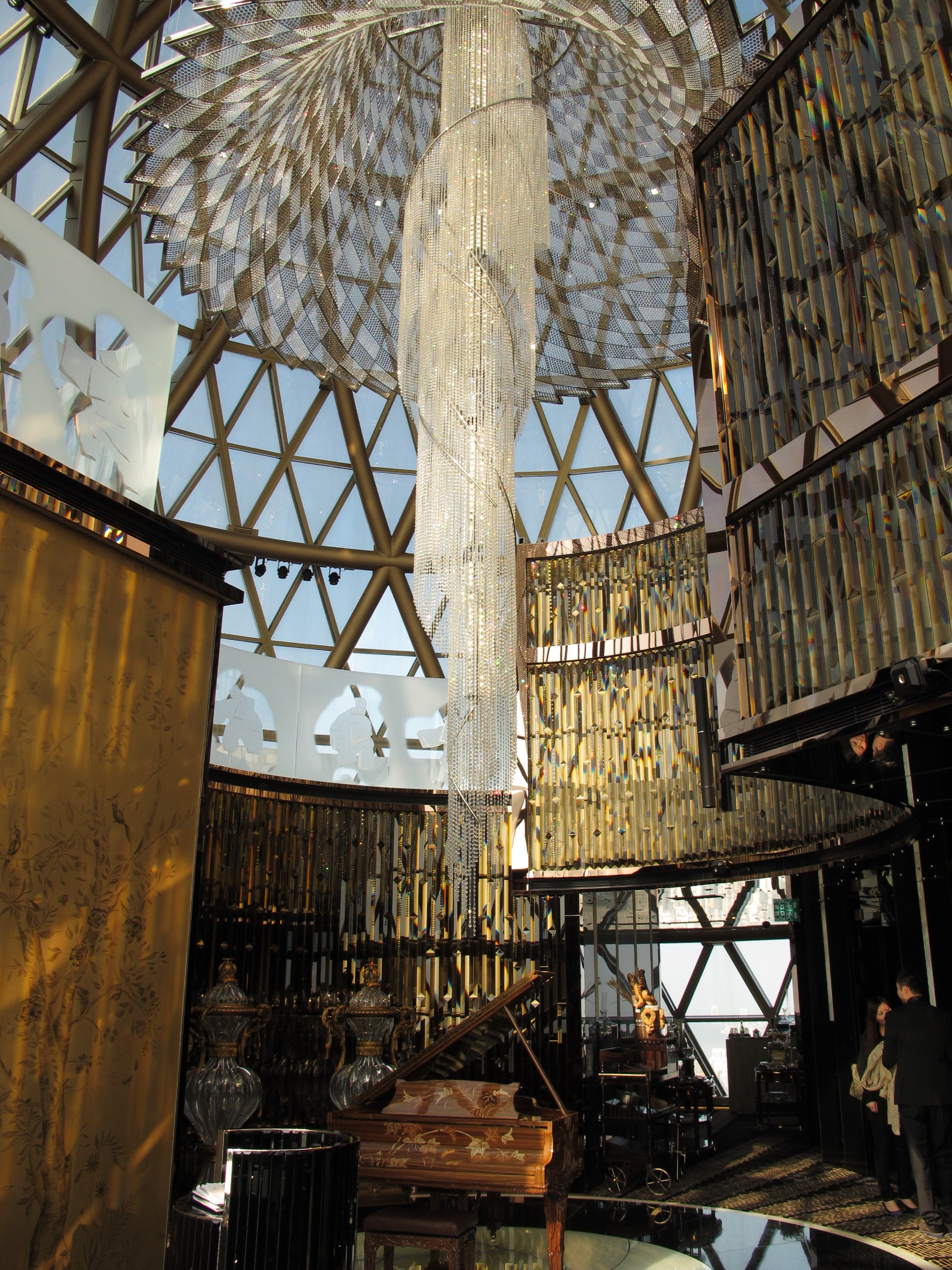
- Interactive map of Robuchon au Dôme

Restaurant information
- Established: 2001; 25 years ago
- Previous owner: Joel Robuchon
- Head chef: Julien Tongourian
- Food type: French
- Dress code: Smart Casual
- Rating: Michelin Guide
- Location: 43rd floor, Grand Lisboa Hotel, Avenida de Lisboa, Macau, Sé, Macau, 43192, Macau
- Seating capacity: 70
- Website: Hotel Website

Robuchon au Dôme is a three Michelin-star restaurant in Macau and is part of the L'Atelier de Joël Robuchon gourmet restaurant chain. The restaurant was established originally in 2001 at the Lisboa Hotel under the name Robuchon á Galera before being moved in 2011 to its current location inside the glass dome at the top of the Grand Lisboa hotel on the 43rd floor. The restaurant is run by French chef Julien Tongourian who is also the executive chef of L'Atelier's Hong Kong location who had worked with Joel Robuchon for over 25 years. The restaurant was awarded 3 Michelin stars in 2009 and has maintained all its stars since then.

== Description ==
The restaurant is located on the top of the luxury Grand Lisboa hotel with a chandelier in the middle consisting of over 131,000 pieces of Swarovski crystal. The restaurant has over 17,800 wines including a selection of rare wines by the glass and has multiple menus for both lunch and dinner including a la carte and tasting menus along with wine pairing options. The restaurant serves haute French cuisine such as their signature dish Le Caviar de Sologne with king crab, and crustacean jelly topped with rings of cauliflower cream, as well as Joel Robuchon's signature pommes purée.

== Recognition ==
- Michelin Guide Hong Kong & Macau: Three Michelin stars since 2009
- Wine Spectator: Grand Award since 2005

== See also ==
- List of Michelin 3-star restaurants in Hong Kong and Macau
- List of Michelin-starred restaurants in Hong Kong and Macau
- List of Michelin starred restaurants
