= New Punjab Club =

Restaurant in Hong Kong

Restaurant information
- Food type: Punjabi (Indian); Pakistani
- Location: Hong Kong

New Punjab Club is a Michelin-starred restaurant in Hong Kong. It serves Punjabi (Indian) and Pakistani cuisine.

== See also ==
- List of Indian restaurants
- List of Michelin-starred restaurants in Hong Kong and Macau
