= Chan Yan-tak =

Hong Kong/Chinese chef

- Born: Kowloon, Hong Kong
- Culinary career
- Cooking style: Cantonese cuisine
- Rating: Michelin stars
- Current restaurant: Lung King Heen

Chan Yan-tak (Chinese: 陳恩德; pinyin: Chén Ēndé; Jyutping: Can4 Jan1dak1) is a Hong Kong/Chinese chef, who is best known for being the first Chinese chef to earn three Michelin stars. He began to work in restaurants in his early teens, and went on to earn his stars at the Lung King Heen restaurant in the Four Seasons hotel in Hong Kong, after they coaxed him out of retirement and back into the kitchen.

== Biography ==
Born in Kowloon, Hong Kong, Chan Yan-tak started working in the kitchen out of necessity: after his father died when he was a child, he began working in kitchens at the age of either 13 or 14 at the Dai Sam Yuen restaurant. He didn't have any particular desire to become a chef, but instead took on the job because his family needed the money. He was so young at the time that he wasn't allowed to use a knife, and was limited to tasks such as plucking chickens and washing vegetables. He became a cook, and worked at a number of restaurants during the 1970s in Hong Kong, including Fook Lam Moon. In 1984 he joined a restaurant at the Regent Hotel Hong Kong as sous chef, becoming executive chef the year after, and worked there for the following fifteen years.

Yan-tak retired from the catering industry following the death of his wife so that he could care for his daughter, but in 2002 the Four Seasons hotel in Hong Kong brought him out of his retirement to become executive chef of the Lung King Heen (English: View of the Dragon) restaurant. The restaurant was awarded three stars in the 2009 Guide Michelin for Hong Kong and Macau, for his Cantonese seafood dishes. He became the first Chinese chef to obtain this distinction, on the first occasion that Michelin brought out a guide for Asia outside of Tokyo. The only other three star award went to a restaurant by Joël Robuchon in Macau.
