= Lung King Heen =

Lung King Heen 龍景軒
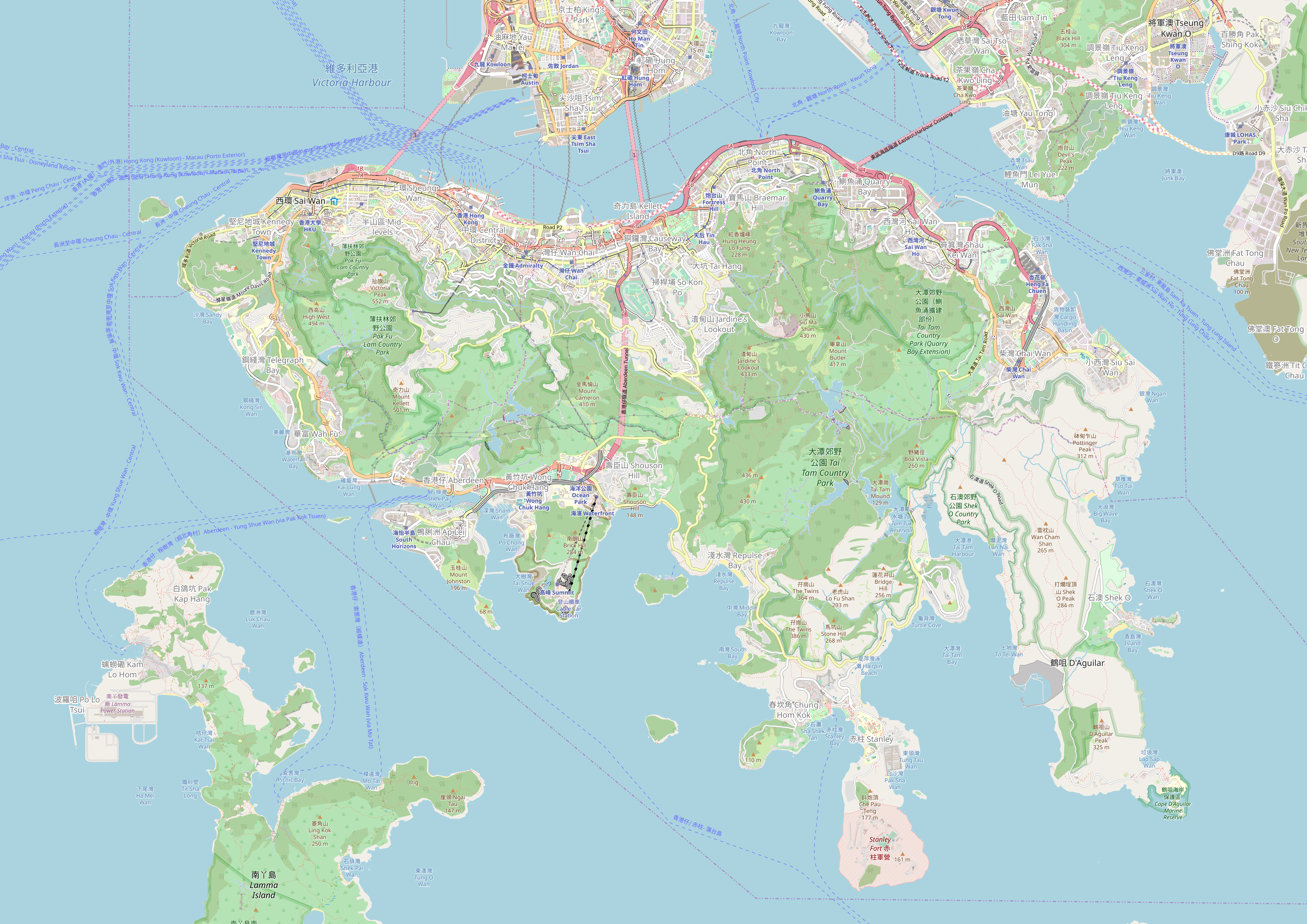
- Location on Hong Kong Island

Restaurant information
- Head chef: Chan Yan-tak (陳恩德)
- Food type: Cantonese cuisine
- Dress code: Smart casual
- Rating: Michelin Guide 2023–present Michelin Guide 2009-2022; 5 stars Forbes Travel Guide 2013
- Location: Podium 4, Four Seasons Hotel, 8 Finance Street, Central, Victoria, Hong Kong, Hong Kong
- Coordinates: 22°17′13″N 114°9′22″E
- Reservations: recommended
- Website: FourSeasons.com/...

Lung King Heen (Chinese: 龍景軒; Jyutping: lung4 ging2 hin1) is a two Michelin star fine dining Cantonese restaurant in the Four Seasons Hotel Hong Kong. Its kitchen is run by chef de cuisine Chan Yan-tak, who came out of early retirement in 2002 for the Hotel.

The restaurant has earned many commendations since its opening. The Michelin Guide awarded it three Michelin stars since 2009 and the continuing 14 years. However, in 2023, the restaurant lost a Michelin star.

== History ==
Chef Chan Yan-tak had spent part of his culinary career as a sous-chef — and after one year, executive chef — at Lai Ching Heen in the Regent Hong Kong since 1984. However, after the death of his wife, he retired in 2000 to help take care of his children. However, Chan was persuaded by his colleague from the Regent, general manager Alan Tsui, to come out of retirement in 2002 to help the Four Seasons establish a Cantonese restaurant.

== Reception ==
Lung King Heen is critically acclaimed. It is the only Cantonese restaurant in Hong Kong that has been awarded the maximum 3 Michelin stars by the 2009 Hong Kong & Macau edition of the Michelin Guide.

In 2010, the restaurant's homemade XO sauce was listed as the 'Best condiment' on the Hong Kong Best Eats 2010 list compiled by CNN Travel. Lung King Heen was also added to Forbes Travel Guide's list of five-star restaurants in January 2014.

== See also ==
- List of Michelin 3-star restaurants in Hong Kong and Macau
- List of Michelin-starred restaurants in Hong Kong and Macau
