= International Finance Centre (Hong Kong) =

Supertall skyscraper in Central, Hong Kong

- 國際金融中心

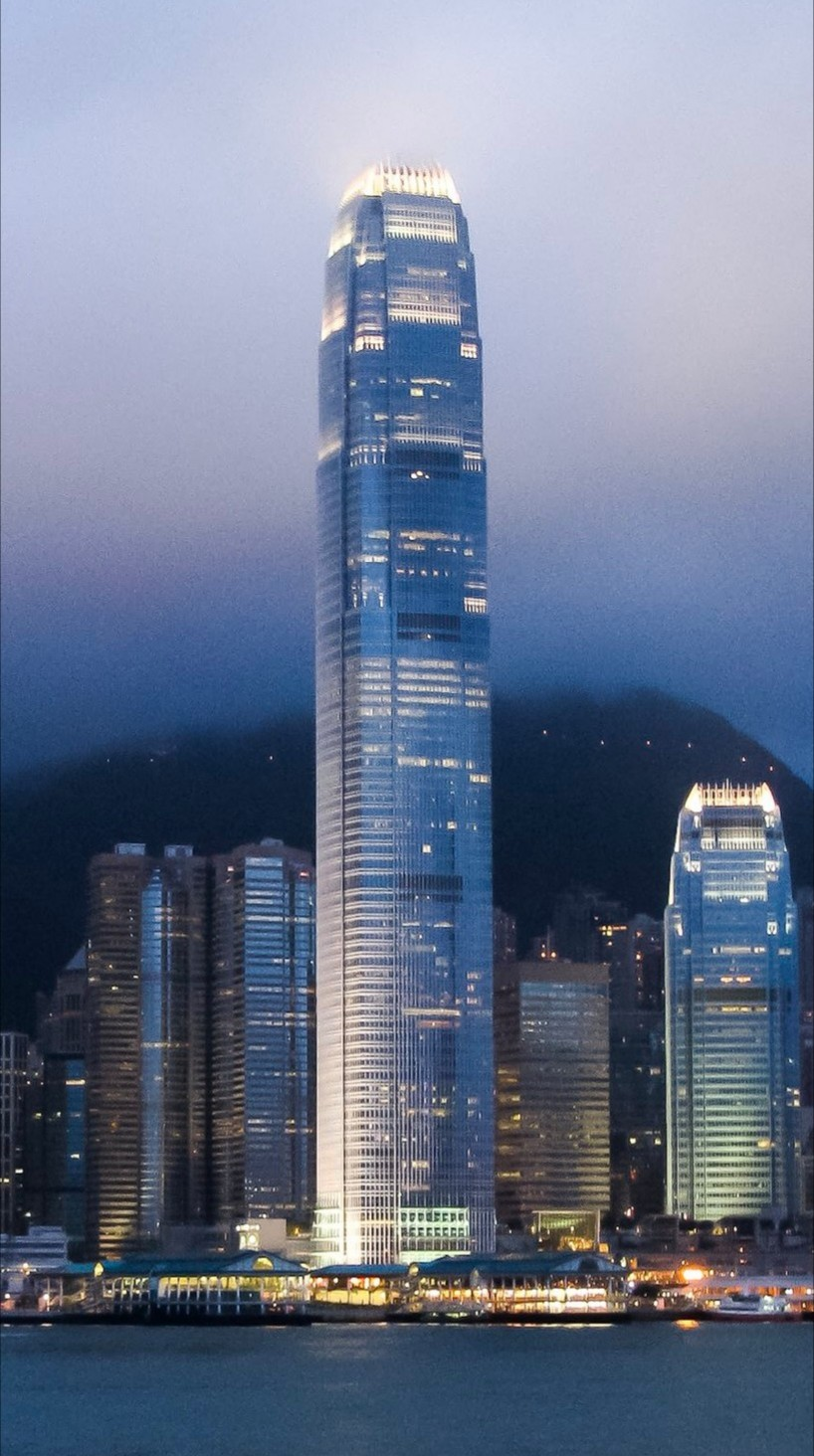
- International Finance Centre

- Location within Hong Kong

General information
- Status: Completed
- Type: Commercial offices
- Location: 8 Finance Street; Central, Hong Kong
- Coordinates: 22°17′6″N 114°9′33″E
- Construction started: 1996; 30 years ago (International Finance Centre 1); 2000; 26 years ago (Two International Finance Centre)
- Completed: 1998; 28 years ago
- Opening: 6 July 1998; 28 years ago (One International Finance Centre); 18 October 2003; 22 years ago (Two International Finance Centre)
- Cost: US$6.4 billion

Height
- Tip: 412 m (1,351.7 ft)
- Roof: 407 m (1,335.3 ft)
- Top floor: 387.6 m (1,271.7 ft)

Technical details
- Floor count: 88 above ground level, 6 basement floors
- Floor area: 185,805 m^{2} (1,999,988 sq ft)
- Lifts/elevators: 62

Design and construction
- Architect: César Pelli & Association Architects
- Executive Architect (Cladding): Adamson Associates Architects
- Developer: Sun Hung Kai Properties, Henderson Land and Towngas
- Structural engineer: Ove Arup & Partners
- Main contractor: E Man-Sanfield Joint Venture
International Finance Centre
- Traditional Chinese: 國際金融中心
- Simplified Chinese: 国际金融中心
- Cantonese Yale: Gwokjai Gāmyùhng Jūngsām
Transcriptions
Standard Mandarin
- Hanyu Pinyin: Guójì jīnróng zhōngxīn
Yue: Cantonese
- Yale Romanization: Gwokjai Gāmyùhng Jūngsām
- Jyutping: Gwok3zai3 Gam1jung4 Zung1sam1
- IPA: [kʷɔk̚˧.tsɐj˧ kɐm˥.jʊŋ˩ tsʊŋ˥.sɐm˥]

The International Finance Centre (abbreviated as IFC) is a skyscraper and integrated commercial development on the Victoria Harbour in Central, Hong Kong.

A prominent landmark on Hong Kong Island, The IFC complex consists of two skyscrapers (1 IFC and 2 IFC), a shopping mall (IFC Mall), and a 55-storey hotel, the Four Seasons Hotel Hong Kong. 2 IFC is the second-tallest building in Hong Kong at a height of 412 m (1,351.7 ft), behind the International Commerce Centre in West Kowloon, and the 38th-tallest building in the world. It is the fourth-tallest building in the Greater China region and the eighth-tallest office building in the world, based on structural heights; it is of similar height to the former World Trade Center. The Airport Express Hong Kong station is directly beneath it, with subway lines to Hong Kong International Airport.

IFC was constructed and is owned by IFC Development, a consortium of Sun Hung Kai Properties, Henderson Land and Towngas.

At the time of its completion, IFC was among the most expensive commercial developments in the world, with total costs exceeding HK$50 billion (US$6.3–6.5 billion), including a record-setting HK$30 billion land premium.

In 2003, Financial Times, HSBC, and Cathay Pacific put up an advertisement on the facade that stretched more than 50 storeys, covering an area of 19,000 m^{2} (200,000 square ft) and a length of 230 m, making it the world's largest advertisement ever put on a skyscraper.

== History ==
Tower 1 is also known as 1IFC and branded in lowercase letters, as "One ifc". Likewise, Tower 2 is also known as 2IFC and branded as "Two ifc".

1IFC opened in December 1998, towards the end of the Asian financial crisis. Tenants included ING Bank, Sumitomo Mitsui Banking Corp, Fidelity International, the Mandatory Provident Fund Schemes Authority and the Financial Times.

The Hong Kong Monetary Authority purchased 14 floors in 2IFC; the Hong Kong Mortgage Corporation signed a 12-year lease on 24,000-square-foot (2,200 m^{2}); Nomura Group agreed to take 60,000 sq ft (5,600 m^{2}) at 2 IFC; the Financial Times, an existing tenant at One IFC, took 10,000 sq ft (900 m^{2}). Ernst & Young took six floors (from the 11th to 18th floors), or about 180,000 square feet (16,700 m^{2}), in 2IFC, to become the biggest tenant.

2IFC, which was completed at the height of the SARS epidemic, was initially available to rent at HK$25-HK$35 per square foot. In 2007, as the economy has improved, high quality ("Grade A") office space is highly sought after; rents for current leases are $150 per square foot as of March 2007.

== One International Finance Centre ==
One International Finance Centre, completed in 1998 and opened on 6 July 1998, has a similar design and appearance with the "Two IFC". It is 689 feet (210 m) tall, has 39 stories and 4 trading floors, 18 high speed passenger lifts in 4 zones, and comprises 784,000 square feet (72,800 m^{2}). The building currently accommodates approximately 5,000 people.

== Two International Finance Centre ==
Two International Finance Centre, completed on 18 October 2003, is attached to the second phase of the ifc mall. This 412-metre-tall (1,351.7 ft), building, currently Hong Kong's second tallest, is quoted as having 88 storeys and 22 high-ceiling trading floors to qualify as being extremely auspicious in Cantonese culture. It is, however, short of the magic number, because "taboo floors" like the 14th and 24th floors are omitted as being inauspicious – in Cantonese and Mandarin Chinese, "4" is pronounced similarly to "death".

Engineers use outrigger trusses tied to eight large composite perimeter columns to address concerns of office workers about working in high-rise buildings after September 11 attack. According to Hong Kong building regulations, high-rises must incorporate refuge floors at 25-floor intervals for emergency evacuation. Placing the outriggers in these unoccupied floors allows structural designers to provide the building with the required resistance against lateral movements without sacrificing lettable space.

The highrise is designed to accommodate financial institutions. For example, the Hong Kong Monetary Authority (HKMA) is located at the 55th floor. It is equipped with advanced telecommunications, raised floors for flexible cabling management, and nearly column-free floor plans. The building expects to accommodate up to 15,000 people. It is one of relatively few buildings in the world equipped with double-deck elevators.

Floor numbers 55, 56, 77 and 88 were bought by the HKMA for HK$3.7 billion in 2001. An exhibition area, currently containing an exhibit of Hong Kong's monetary history, and a library of the Hong Kong Monetary Authority Information Centre occupy the 55th floor, and are open to the public during office hours.

Despite common practice for owners to allow naming buildings after its important tenants, the owners decided not to allow renaming of the building.

Current office tenants include Banco Santander, Baring Private Equity Asia, BGC Partners, Blackstone Group, BNP Paribas, China Universal Asset Management, Citadel, Coatue Management, DST Advisors, E Fund Management, Hillhouse Capital, Hony Capital, Investec Asset Management, Jefferies, Lazard, Lexington Partners, Millennium Management, Nomura, Sidley Austin LLP, Silver Lake, State Street Bank & Trust Company, UBS and Warburg Pincus.

== Four Seasons Hotel Hong Kong ==
The Four Seasons Hotel is a luxury hotel that was built near IFC One and Two. It was completed and opened in October 2005. The 206 m (674 ft), 60-storey oceanfront hotel is the only Four Seasons Hotel in Hong Kong. The hotel has 399 guest suites, and 519 serviced apartments. Amenities include a French restaurant Caprice and spa.

== IFC Mall ==
The IFC Mall is a 74,000-square-metre (800,000 sq ft), 4-storey luxury shopping mall, with many luxury retail brands and a wide variety of restaurants. Anchored by Lane Crawford, PALACE Cinema (part of Broadway Circuit), and C!ty'super, the first official Apple Store was also located in this mall (a 3-storey flagship store in Hong Kong). In May 2018, the first Shake Shack restaurant in Hong Kong was opened in the mall.

== Cultural impact ==
The IFC towers have been featured in several Hollywood films, including Lara Croft: Tomb Raider – The Cradle of Life, where Lara Croft leaps off the then-under-construction 2 International Finance Centre, landing on a ship out in the Kowloon Bay, The Dark Knight, where Batman leapt from 2 IFC to 1 IFC, and Godzilla vs Kong, where an action scene then takes place.

== See also ==
- List of tallest buildings in Hong Kong
- List of buildings and structures in Hong Kong
- List of tallest buildings
- Shanghai IFC, sister project located in Shanghai
- Salesforce Tower, similar building in San Francisco
- 30 Hudson Street, similar building in Jersey City
