= Four Seasons Hotel Hong Kong =

Hotel in Central, Hong Kong

Four Seasons Hotel
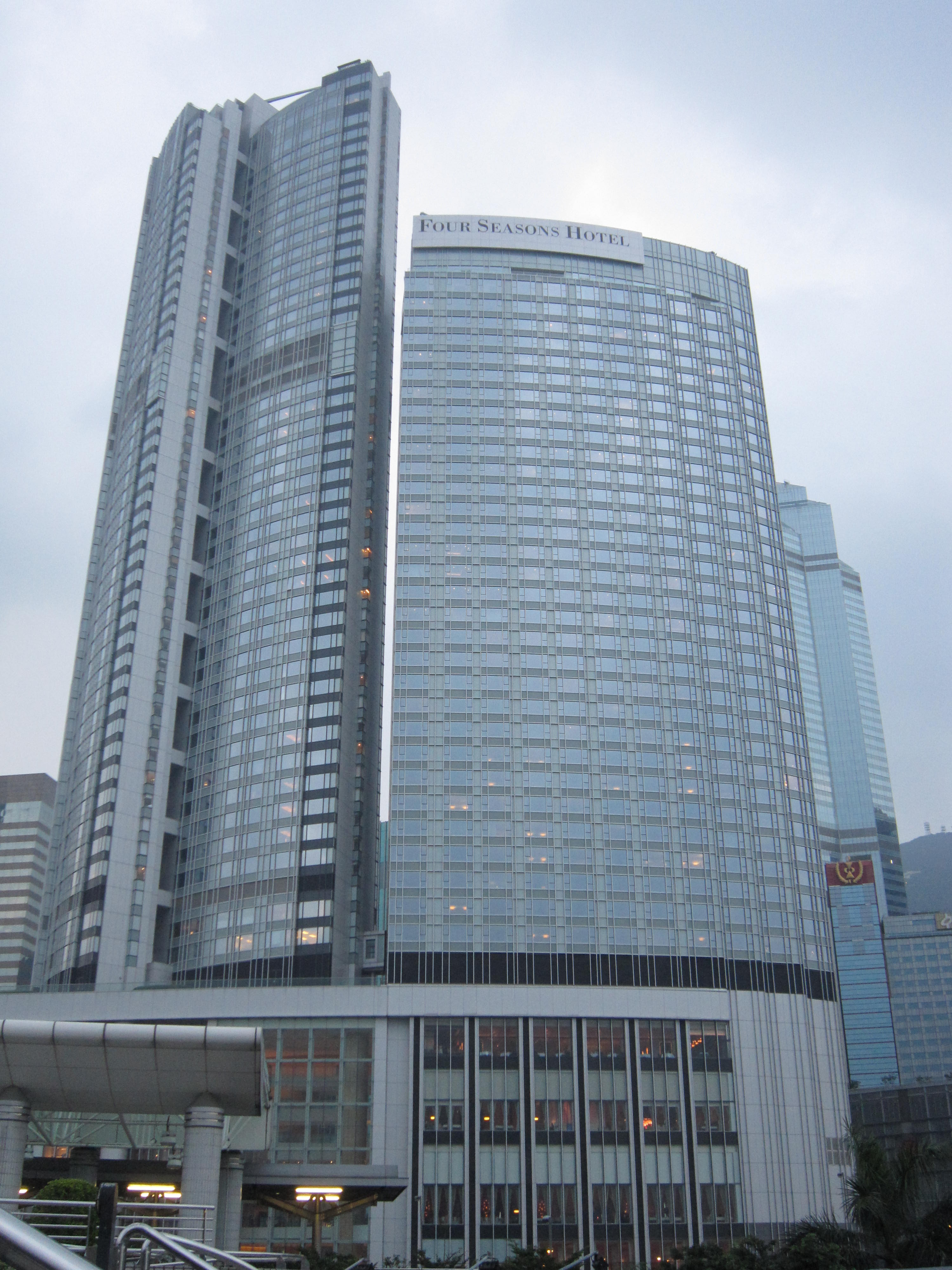

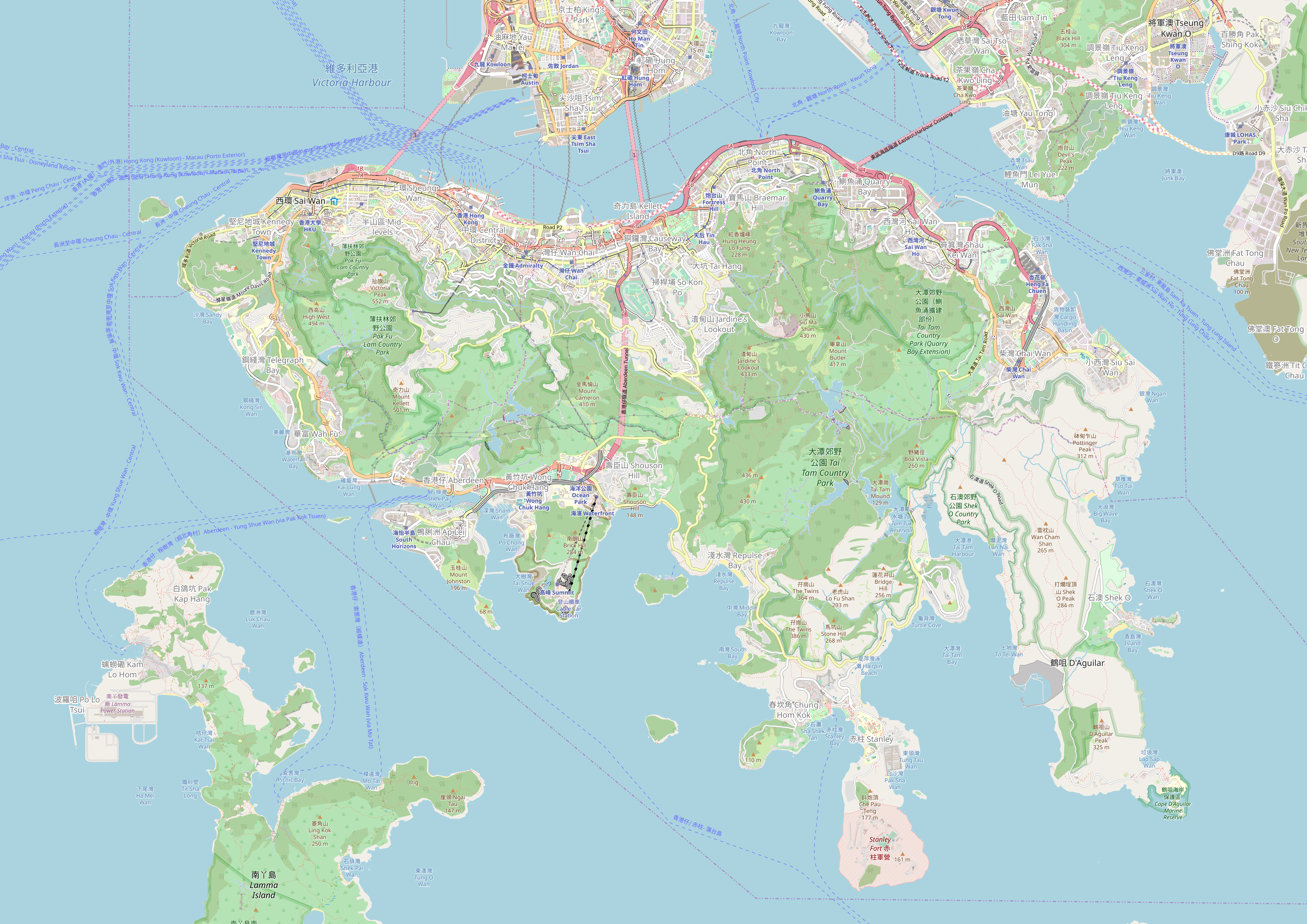
- Location on Hong Kong Island

General information
- Location: 8 Finance Street, Central, Hong Kong
- Coordinates: 22°17′13″N 114°9′22″E
- Opening: September 2005; 21 years ago
- Operator: Four Seasons Hotels and Resorts

Technical details
- Floor count: 45
- Floor area: 52,051 square metres/560,272 square feet

Design and construction
- Developer: Sun Hung Kai Properties, Henderson Land and Towngas

Other information
- Number of rooms: 399
- Number of suites: 54

Website
- Four Seasons Hotel Hong Kong official website

Four Seasons Hotel Hong Kong
- Chinese: 香港四季酒店
Transcriptions
Standard Mandarin
- Hanyu Pinyin: Xiānggǎng Sìjì Jiǔdiàn
Yue: Cantonese
- Jyutping: hoeng1 gong2 sei3 gwai3 zau2 dim3

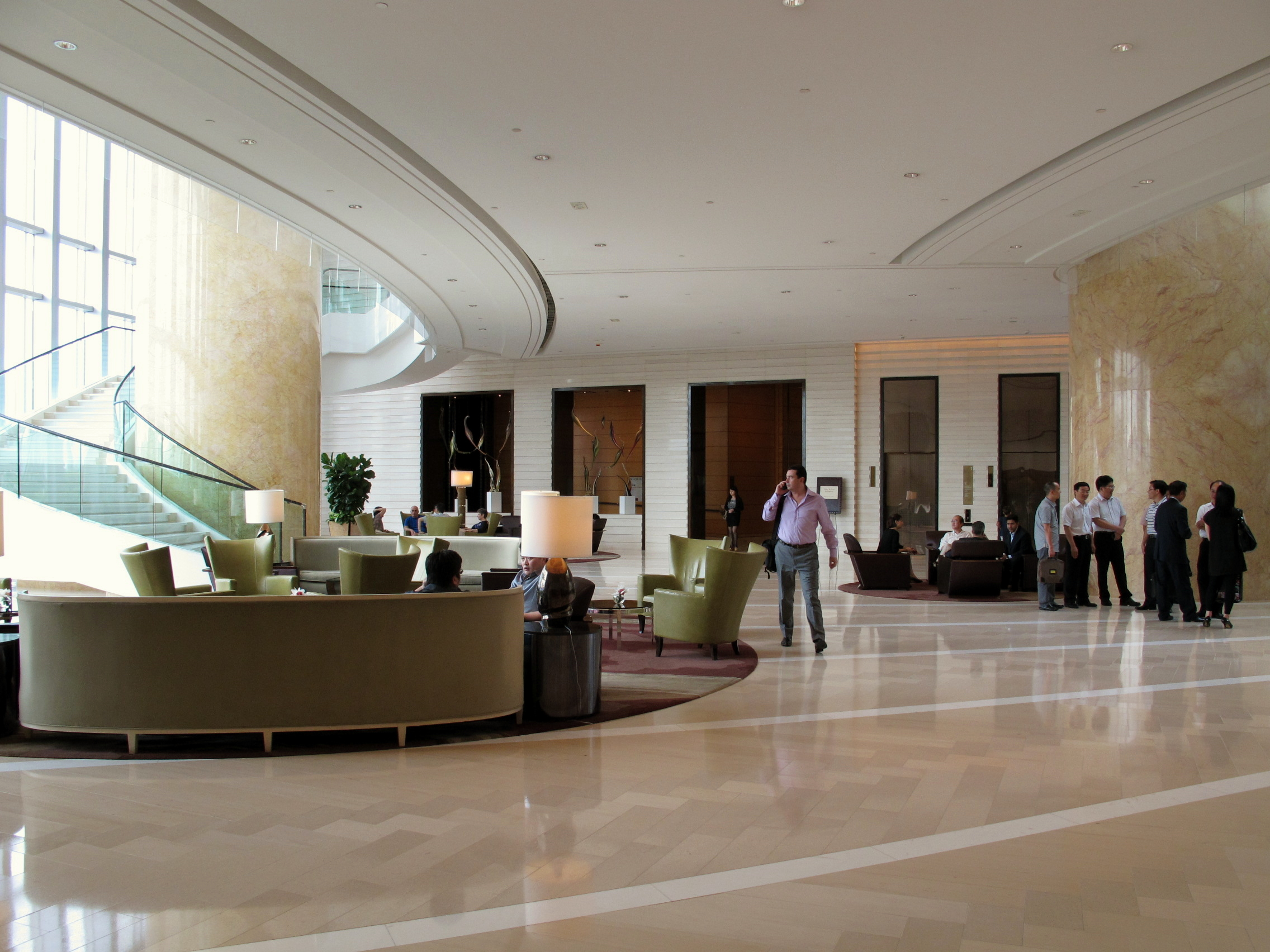
Four Seasons Hotel Hong Kong Lobby

Four Seasons Hotel Hong Kong (Chinese: 香港四季酒店) is a five-star hotel located in the International Finance Centre complex in Central, Hong Kong near Hong Kong station. It was completed and opened in September 2005. It is a 45-storey building with 399 rooms, of which 54 are suites, and also contains 519 residential units, as part of the Four Seasons Place serviced apartments (Chinese: 四季匯). It is operated by Canadian-based hotel chain, Four Seasons Hotels and Resorts.

== Rooms and facilities ==
The hotel has 399 guest rooms and suites including studio, 1-bedroom, 2-bedroom and 3-bedroom from 547 sf gross to 1,867 sf gross. There are two styles of guest room - Western contemporary, with silk-paneled walls and marble-floored entry foyers, and rooms with a traditional Chinese influence, featuring sculpted furnishings and gold leaf. The hotel does not have floors numbered 13, 14, 24, 34 or 44.

Four Seasons Hotel Hong Kong operates a collection of restaurants and bars offering Cantonese, French, Italian and Japanese cuisine, alongside international dining and cocktail services.

Lung King Heen specialises in Cantonese cuisine, including dim sum and seafood. In 2009, it became the first Chinese restaurant to receive three Michelin stars. It held this distinction for several years and was awarded two Michelin stars in the 2026 Michelin Guide.

Caprice serves French cuisine and holds three Michelin stars in the 2026 Michelin Guide. Its menu features seasonal ingredients, seafood and French culinary techniques, alongside an extensive wine selection.

Noi by Paulo Airaudo offers Italian cuisine through a tasting-menu format and holds two Michelin stars in the 2026 Michelin Guide.

The hotel's other dining venues include The Lounge, which serves international cuisine, Gallery, which offers all-day dining and afternoon tea, and Pool Terrace, which serves lighter meals and drinks.

ARGO is the hotel's cocktail bar, featuring contemporary cocktails and a collection of spirits from international producers. Opened in 2021, the bar has received recognition in international bar rankings. In 2025, it ranked 11th in Asia's 50 Best Bars and 56th in The World's 50 Best Bars extended ranking. In 2026, it ranked 37th in Asia's 50 Best Bars, becoming the only hotel bar in Hong Kong to appear on that year's list. The hotel's other bar, Caprice Bar, specialises in wine and French cheeses.

== History ==
In 2009, Four Seasons Hotel Hong Kong became the first hotel in the world to hold two restaurants, Lung King Heen and Caprice, with three Michelin stars, the maximum rating.

On 11 February 2015, Forbes Travel Guide awarded the hotel a five-star rating.

In 2017, billionaire Xiao Jianhua was taken to the mainland reportedly by Chinese public security officers. Five or six plain-clothed agents accosted Xiao at his hotel apartment and, after a meeting inside, escorted him and his two bodyguards across the border.

In 2026 Four Seasons Hotel Hong Kong was awarded two Michelin keys.

Four Seasons Hotel Hong Kong ranks 86th on The World’s 50 Best Hotels extended list.

== See also ==
- List of tallest buildings in Hong Kong
