= 8½ Otto e Mezzo Bombana =

8 1/2 Otto e Mezzo Bombana
- Interactive map of 8 1/2 Otto e Mezzo Bombana

Restaurant information
- Head chef: Umberto Bombana
- Food type: Italian
- Dress code: Business casual
- Rating: (Hong Kong) Michelin Guide (Macau) Michelin Guide
- Location: Shop 202, Alexandra House, 18 Chater Road, Central, Hong Kong
- Coordinates: 22.28153°N 114.15878°E
- Seating capacity: 79 (55 main dining room + 12 each in 2 private dining rooms)
- Reservations: advised
- Other information: (Tel) (852) 2537-8859
- Website: ottoemezzobombana.com

8 1/2 Otto e Mezzo Bombana is an Italian restaurant at Shop 202, Alexandra House, Central, Hong Kong. It is the only Italian restaurant outside of Italy to have received 3 stars from the Michelin Guide, having been awarded 3 stars by the 2012 Michelin Guide Hong Kong and Macau. Its head chef is Umberto Bombana.

== History ==
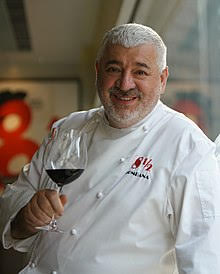
Head chef Umberto Bombana

Umberto Bombana trained under Ezio Santin. He worked at Toscana at the Ritz-Carlton, Hong Kong from 1993. He was a prime mover in introducing the white truffle to Hong Kong's restaurant scene, and he introduced the World White Truffle of Alba Auction to Hong Kong. In 2006, Bombana was appointed by Piedmontese Regional Enoteca Cavour as their International White Truffle Ambassador.

The Ritz-Carlton hotel was demolished in 2008 to make way for the building of China Construction Bank. Umberto Bombana then opened 8 1/2 Otto e Mezzo Bombana in January 2010. The restaurant's name is a tribute to Bombana's favorite Italian film director Federico Fellini's 1963 autobiographical movie 8 1/2.

On 13 November 2011, 8 1/2 Otto e Mezzo Bombana hosted the Hong Kong bidders for the annual World White Truffle of Alba Auction, linking by satellite to the Italian auction grounds.

On 9 January 2014, Galaxy Entertainment Group Ltd announced that the 8 1/2 Otto e Mezzo Bombana restaurant will be a feature at Galaxy Macau's under construction Ritz-Carlton hotel, which will open in mid-2015.

== Awards ==
In November 2010, the restaurant was awarded 2 Michelin stars by the 2011 Michelin Guide Hong Kong and Macau.

In November 2011, it was voted 13th best restaurant in Asia by the Miele Guide.

In 2012, awarded 3 stars by the Michelin Guide.

On 29 April 2013, 8 1/2 Otto e Mezzo was named 39th in the top 100 restaurants of the world in The World's Best Restaurants Awards.

In April 2017 it was named No. 4 Best Restaurant in Asia in San Pellegrino's 'Asia's 50 Best Restaurants'.

== See also ==
- List of Michelin 3-star restaurants in Hong Kong and Macau
- List of Michelin-starred restaurants in Hong Kong and Macau
