= Beefbar =

International restaurant chain founded in Monaco

- Type: Private
- Industry: Restaurants
- Founded: 2005
- Founder: Riccardo Giraudi
- Headquarters: Monte Carlo, Monaco
- Area served: Worldwide
- Products: Restaurant dining

Beefbar is an international restaurant chain founded in Monaco in 2005 by restaurateur Riccardo Giraudi. Originating in Monte Carlo, the company operates restaurants across Europe, Asia, the Middle East, North America and the Caribbean. The chain expanded internationally during the 2010s and 2020s and operated approximately 40 locations worldwide by 2024.

== History ==
Beefbar was founded in Monte Carlo in 2005 by Monaco-based entrepreneur Riccardo Giraudi, chief executive of the Giraudi Group.

The concept was developed from Giraudi's experience in the international meat trade and was conceived as a contemporary interpretation of the traditional steakhouse.

During the 2010s and 2020s, Beefbar expanded internationally, opening restaurants in cities including Paris, Hong Kong, Dubai, Milan, Mykonos, São Paulo and New York City.

In a 2026 retrospective marking the company's twentieth anniversary, L'Observateur de Monaco described Beefbar as one of Monaco's most internationally recognised restaurant brands and noted its expansion from a single restaurant in Monte Carlo to a global network of locations.

In 2024, Beefbar opened its first United States restaurant in the Tribeca neighbourhood of Manhattan, occupying the former Nobu restaurant space on Hudson Street.

== Concept ==
Beefbar was conceived as a modern European steakhouse concept. According to the Michelin Guide, the concept combines premium beef cuts with dishes inspired by international cuisines and contemporary dining trends.

Several Beefbar locations have been designed in collaboration with architects and interior designers Humbert & Poyet.

== At sea ==
In 2024, Beefbar launched its first restaurants at sea aboard the luxury cruise ships Crystal Serenity and Crystal Symphony through a partnership with Crystal Cruises. Crystal became the first cruise line to offer the Beefbar concept at sea, replacing the ships' previous Tastes Kitchen & Bar venue with a menu based on Beefbar's restaurant format.

Travel Weekly described the partnership as part of Crystal's effort to differentiate its culinary offering within the luxury cruise market and noted that selected dishes from the previous restaurant concept would remain on the menu.

The collaboration was later profiled by Forbes, which described the venture as Beefbar's first dedicated restaurant concept at sea.

== Reception ==
Beefbar Hong Kong received its first Michelin star in 2017 and has remained listed in subsequent editions of the Hong Kong & Macau Michelin Guide.

The original Monaco restaurant has been included in the Michelin Guide.

The opening of Beefbar New York attracted coverage from publications including The New York Times, Time Out New York and Wallpaper*.

In 2025, Beefbar was ranked first in the "Multiple Outlets" category of the World's 101 Best Steak Restaurants rankings.

== See also ==
- Riccardo Giraudi
- Giraudi Group
