= Argo (bar) =

Drinking establishment in Hong Kong

- Interactive map of Argo
- Location: Hong Kong
- Coordinates: 22°17′12″N 114°09′24″E

Argo is a bar in Hong Kong.
