= L'Atelier de Joël Robuchon (Hong Kong) =

Restaurant in Hong Kong

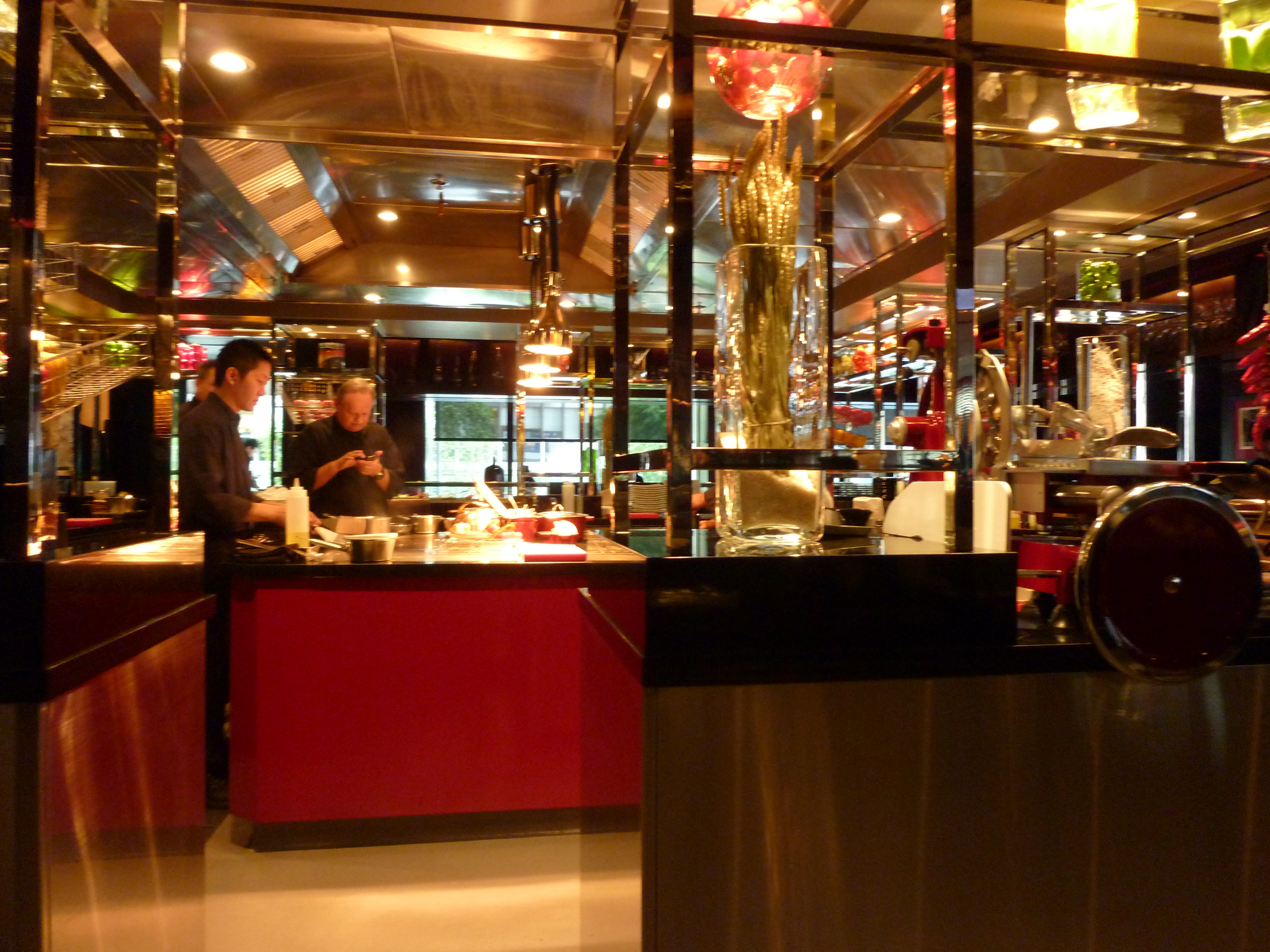

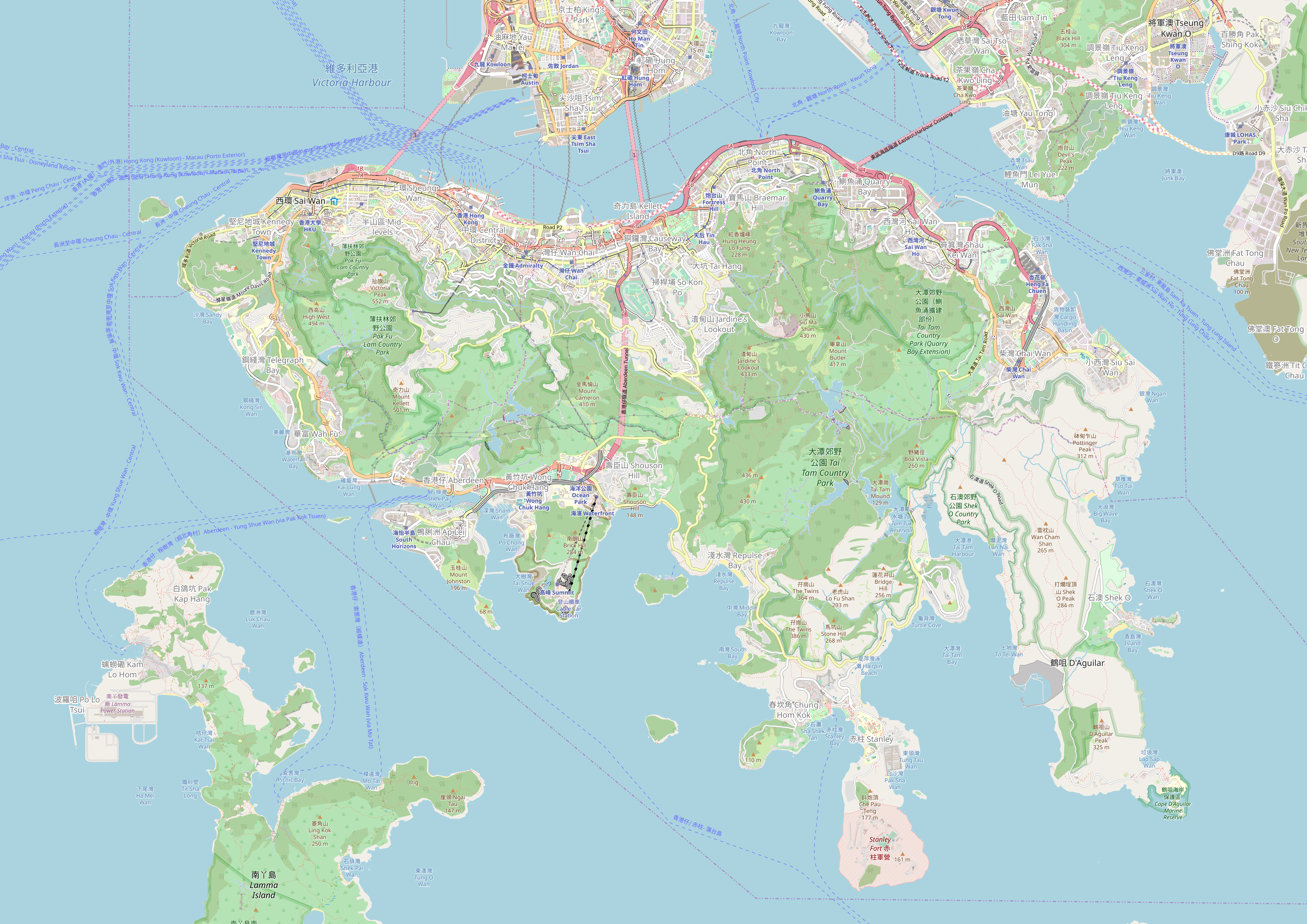
- Location on Hong Kong Island

Restaurant information
- Established: 2006; 20 years ago
- Head chef: Cattaneo Adriano
- Chef: Joël Robuchon
- Food type: French
- Location: Shop 403-410, The Landmark, Queen's Road Central, Central, Victoria City, Hong Kong
- Coordinates: 22°16′52″N 114°9′29″E

L'Atelier de Joël Robuchon is a formerly three Michelin-starred restaurant in Hong Kong. It is located at Shops 403-410, 4/F, The Landmark, Queen's Road Central. The restaurant was run by French celebrity chef Joël Robuchon before his death, it was his fifth L'Atelier restaurant to open, while the head chef is Cattaneo Adriano. Established in 2006, the restaurant was based on his Tokyo restaurant.

== Description ==
The decor of the restaurant has been described as "contemporary chic featuring lush red velvet seating complemented by dark wood furniture." Like the Tokyo restaurant, L'Atelier de Joël Robuchon of Hong Kong is divided into two areas – L'Atelier and Le Jardin. The seats of L'Atelier are in a square around the open kitchen, in a manner similar to a sushi restaurant. The restaurant has an extensive wine collection, and was awarded the Wine Spectator's "Grand Award" in 2010. As of 2020, there are eight L'Atelier de Joël Robuchon restaurants around the world.

== History ==
The restaurant was first announced in March 2006, with the restaurant opening later that year. The restaurant concept was based on his Tokyo edition, established three years earlier. It was his fifth L'Atelier restaurant to open, which means "artist's workshop".

== Reception and recognition ==
- Michelin Guide Hong Kong & Macau: Three stars from 2010 until 2024
- Michelin Guide Hong Kong & Macau: Two stars in 2026
- Wine Spectator: Grand Award since 2010
- WORLD OF FINE WINE 2019: Three stars, Best Dessert & Fortified Wine List, Best Long Wine List, Runner-Up Best Champagne & Sparkling Wine List
- CHINA'S WINE LIST OF THE YEAR: Three Glass Rating since 2013

== See also ==
- List of Michelin 3-star restaurants in Hong Kong and Macau
- List of Michelin-starred restaurants in Hong Kong and Macau
- List of Michelin starred restaurants
