= The Harbourfront Landmark =

Residential skyscraper in Hong Kong

- 海名軒
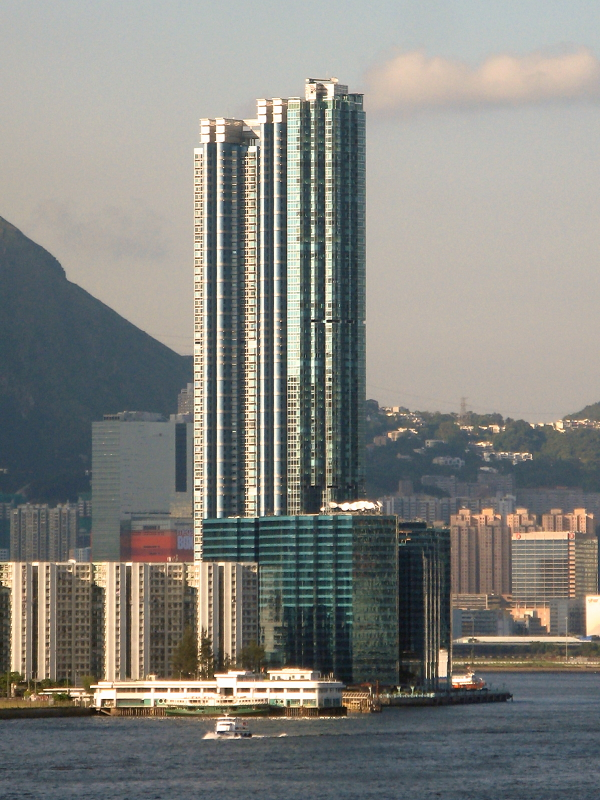
- Interactive map of the The Harbourfront Landmark area

General information
- Location: 11 Wan Hoi Street, Hung Hom, Hong Kong
- Coordinates: 22°18′12″N 114°11′35″E
- Completed: December 2001; 24 years ago

Height
- Antenna spire: 233 m (764 ft)

Technical details
- Floor count: 70

Design and construction
- Developer: Cheung Kong Holdings

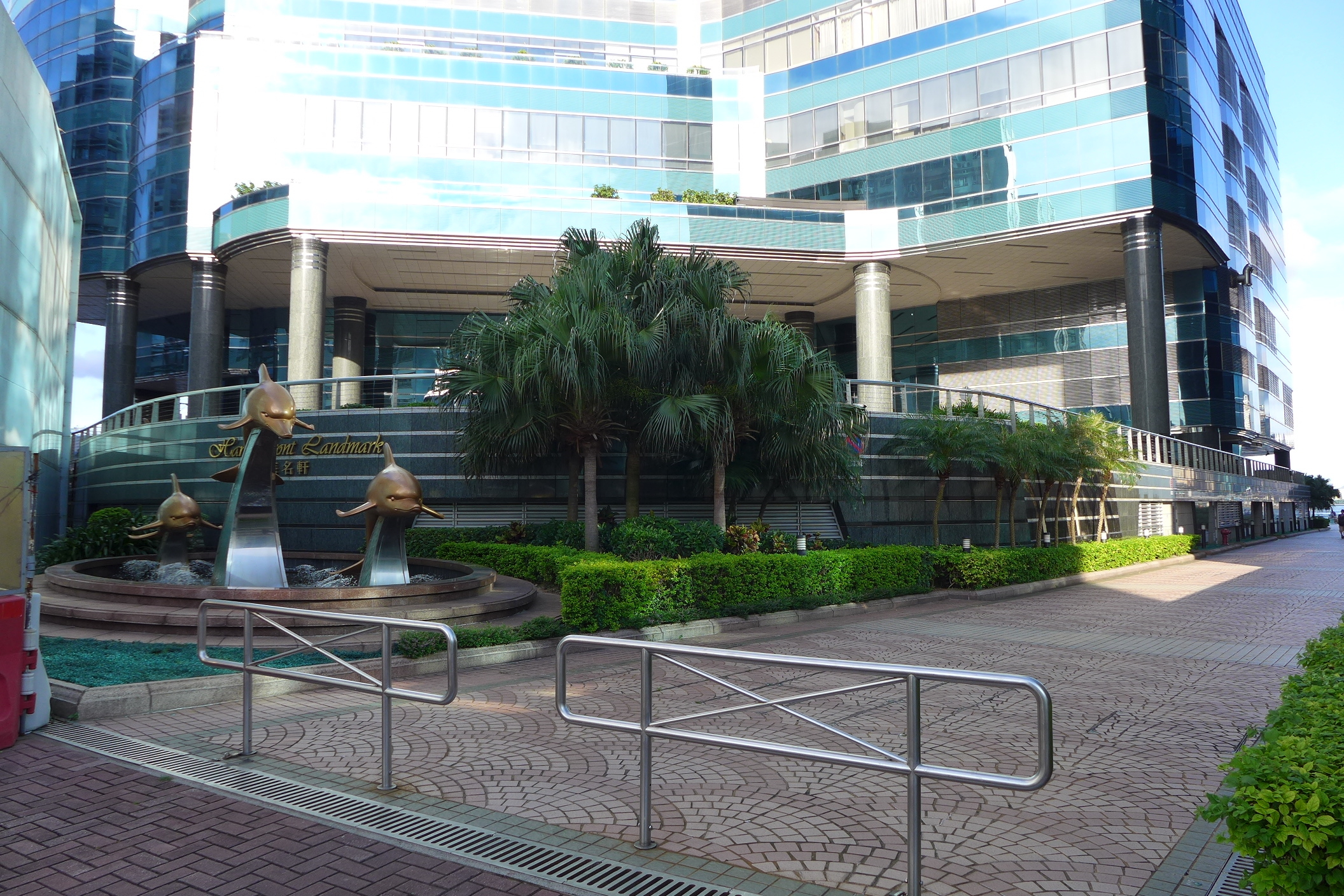
Harbourfront Landmark Entrance

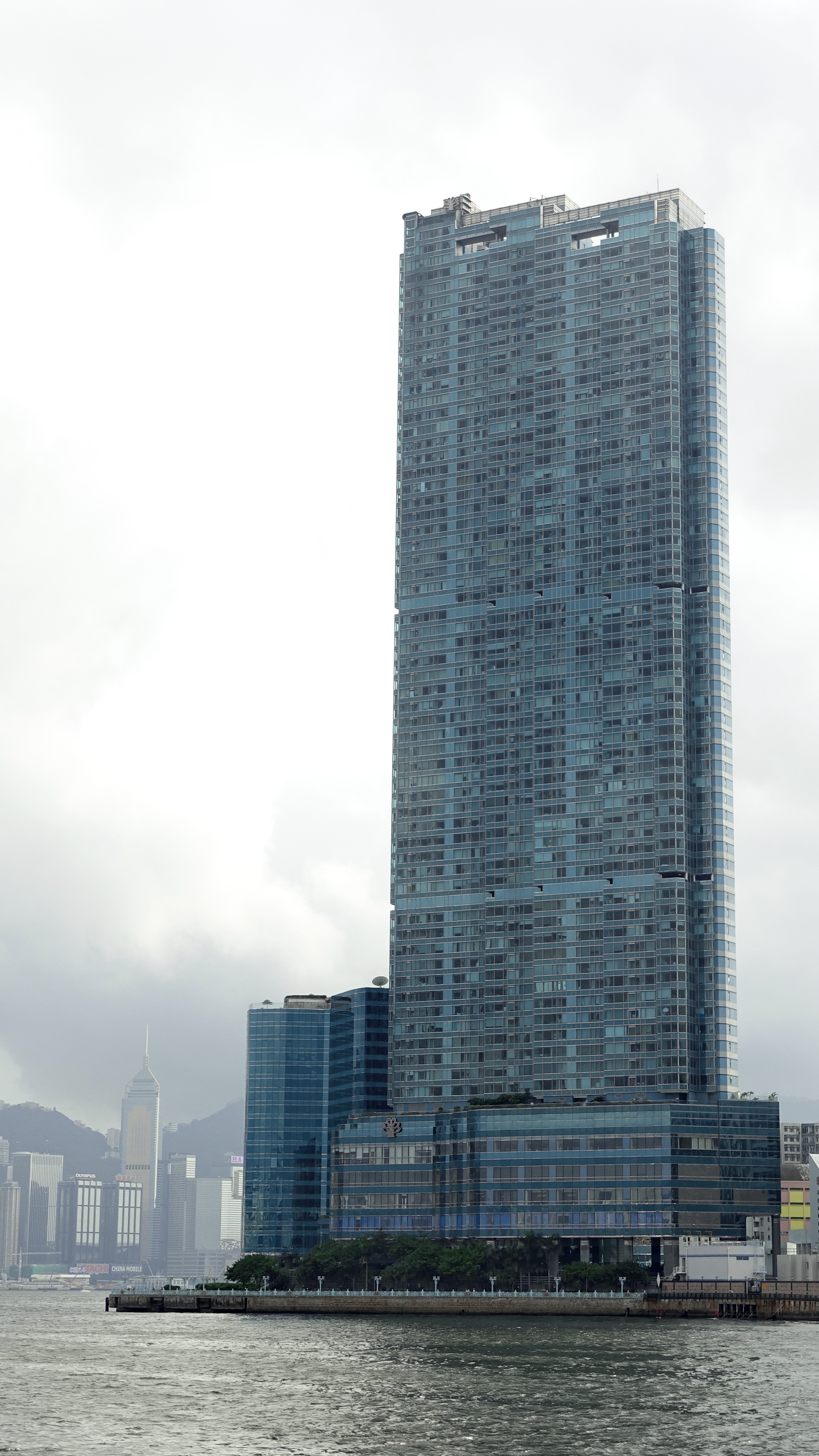
The Harbourfront Landmark alongside Victoria Harbour

The Harbourfront Landmark (Chinese: 海名軒; Cantonese Yale: Hói mìhng hīn) is a 70-floor 233 meters tall luxury apartment completed in 2001 located in Hung Hom Bay in the Kowloon Peninsula, Hong Kong. This prime waterfront residence has glass curtain walls and sweeping views of the Victoria Harbour, it consists of 324 residential units with penthouse apartments on the top floors.

== Clubhouse ==
Harbourfront Landmark includes a clubhouse on the 7th floor, open to both residents and visitors. The majority of the clubhouse's amenities have to be paid for, with members having a discount. The clubhouse is guarded by a keypad locking the entrance doors.

Harbourfront Landmark's swimming pool is located behind the reception, where swimmers have to pass through the changing rooms and a foot bath. There are three pools: a main pool, a wading pool and a jacuzzi. The main pool is not an official 25 meter pool - but just barely shorter, and lacking swimming flags. The main pool's maximum depth is 1.2m. The wading pool is designed for children, with a maximum depth of 0.6m. The jacuzzi is made up of two, smaller jacuzzis, one bigger than the other.

== Location ==
Harbourfront Landmark is located in Whampoa, which makes it only a few minutes the Hung Hom Ferry Pier, Whampoa Station, and The Whampoa Garden Bus Terminus.

== See also ==
- Hung Hom Ferry Pier
- List of tallest buildings in Hong Kong
