= Umberto Bombana =

Italian chef

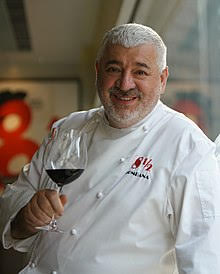
- Umberto Bombana, at his restaurant 8 1/2 Otto e Mezzo Bombana
- Born: 1963 (age 62–63); Clusone, Italy
- Culinary career
- Cooking style: Italian Cuisine
- Rating: Michelin stars
- Current restaurant(s): 8½ Otto e Mezzo, CIAK
- Website: www.ottoemezzobombana.com

Umberto Bombana (born 1963) is an Italian chef and co-owner of three Michelin star restaurant 8½ Otto e Mezzo Bombana.

He is hailed as the "King of White Truffles" and was appointed a "Worldwide Ambassador of the White Truffle" by the Piedmontese Regional Enoteca Cavour.

== Career ==
A native of Clusone, Bergamo in Northern Italy, Bombana was inspired by his grandmother who used to cook for an aristocratic family. As a child, his pastime was eating and observing all stages of his grandmother's meal preparation.

After finishing hotel school, Bombana trained and apprenticed at one of the best Italian restaurants at that time, Antica Osteria del Ponte, with acclaimed chef Ezio Santin.

In 1983 he moved to Los Angeles to work with one of the most respected Italian restaurateurs, Mauro Vincenti. In the 1990s he arrived in Hong Kong to open Toscana at the Ritz-Carlton. “I knew I wanted to come to Asia. I was young. I wanted the experience even though I loved California.”

In 2008 the Ritz-Carlton closed down to redevelop the building and two years later Bombana opened 8½ Otto e Mezzo Bombana. The name is a tribute to Bombana's favorite Italian film director Federico Fellini’s 1963 autobiographical movie 8½.

In 2013, Chef Bombana developed a more casual, refined trattoria concept called CIAK - In The Kitchen, in The Landmark in Hong Kong. It was followed by CIAK – All Day Italian in The Cityplaza mall, Quarry Bay. Both outlets are listed in the Bib Gourmands section of the Michelin Guide.

Chef Bombana expanded his Otto e Mezzo brand into The Galaxy Macau in 2015. It now holds one Michelin star. Otto e Mezzo Shanghai opened in 2016, which now possesses two Michelin stars. He has also opened the restaurant Opera Bombana in Beijing, China.

In February 2017, Bombana received The Diners Club® Lifetime Achievement Award for 2017 at a ceremony in Bangkok. In July 2017 he opened another new restaurant in Hong Kong called Octavium, which he has called his ‘laboratory’. It is located on the 8th floor of One Chinachem Central.

In 2017 Bombana was bestowed with the honourable title of Order of Merit of the Italian Republic (OMRI). The ceremony was officiated by the Consul General of Italy in Hong Kong, Antonello De Riu, who also presented the OMRI to Chef Bombana.
