= Olivier Bellin =

French chef

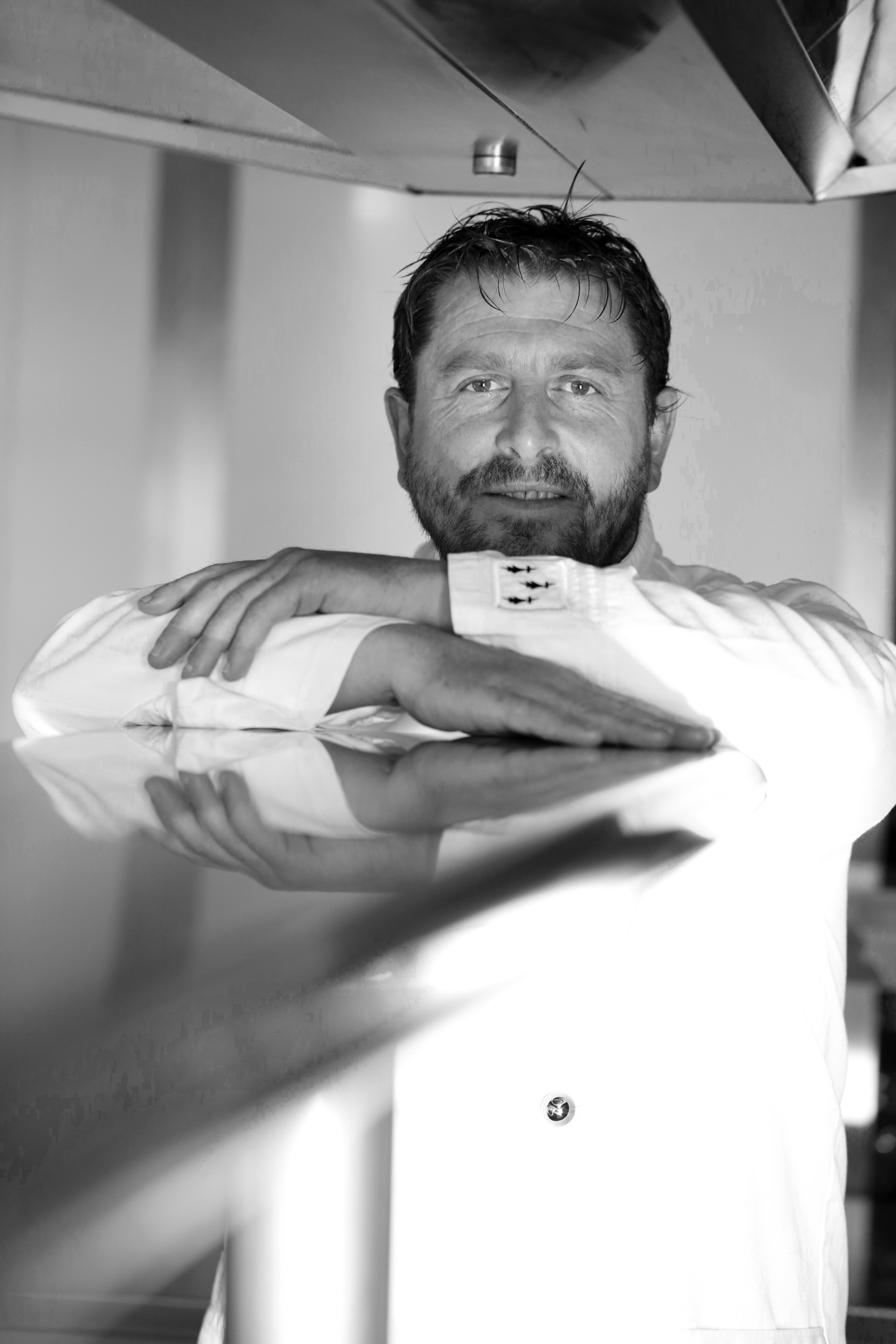
- Born: 8 August 1971 (age 54); Quimper, Finistère, France
- Culinary career
- Ratings: Michelin stars L'Auberge des Glazick The Ocean; Gault Millau L'Auberge des Glazick (18/20)
- Current restaurants: L'Auberge des Glazicks (Plomodiern); The Ocean (Hong Kong)

Olivier Bellin (born 8 August 1971) is a French chef, two stars at the Guide Michelin. He is the owner of the restaurant L'Auberge des Glazicks in Plomodiern, a village located between Quimper and Brest in the department of Finistère.

== Professional career ==
A former student at the professional high school "Le Paraclet" in Quimper, Olivier Bellin began his career working from 1995 to 1996 with Joël Robuchon in Paris as a cooking assistant and roasting chef. He then returned to Brittany in La Roche-Bernard working with chef Jacques Thorel in his restaurant with two Michelin stars.

He transformed the inn of his parents, a simple restaurant, into a gastronomic restaurant. During all that time and with the support of Alain Ducasse who invited him to participate at the concept Food France, he started to become well known and began developing his cuisine.

In 2005, he received his first Michelin star. The 2009 edition of the Gault Millau gave him 4 toques and the grade of 17/20 for his restaurant L'Auberge des Glazicks. In 2010, he received his second Michelin star.

Olivier Bellin opened The Ocean at The Pulse in Repulse Bay, Hong Kong in 2017. The restaurant earned its first Michelin star in just its first year of operation.

== Bibliography ==
- Saveur blé noir en Finistère, Collection "Carnet de chef", Romain Pages Éditions, Sommières.
- Écailles et coquilles, Poissons & crustacés, Romain Pages Éditions, Sommières.
- Bretagne, Romain Pages Éditions.

== Honours ==
- Chevalier des Arts et des Lettres (2011)

== See also ==
- List of Michelin-starred restaurants in Paris
