= Caprice (restaurant) =

Restaurant in Hong Kong

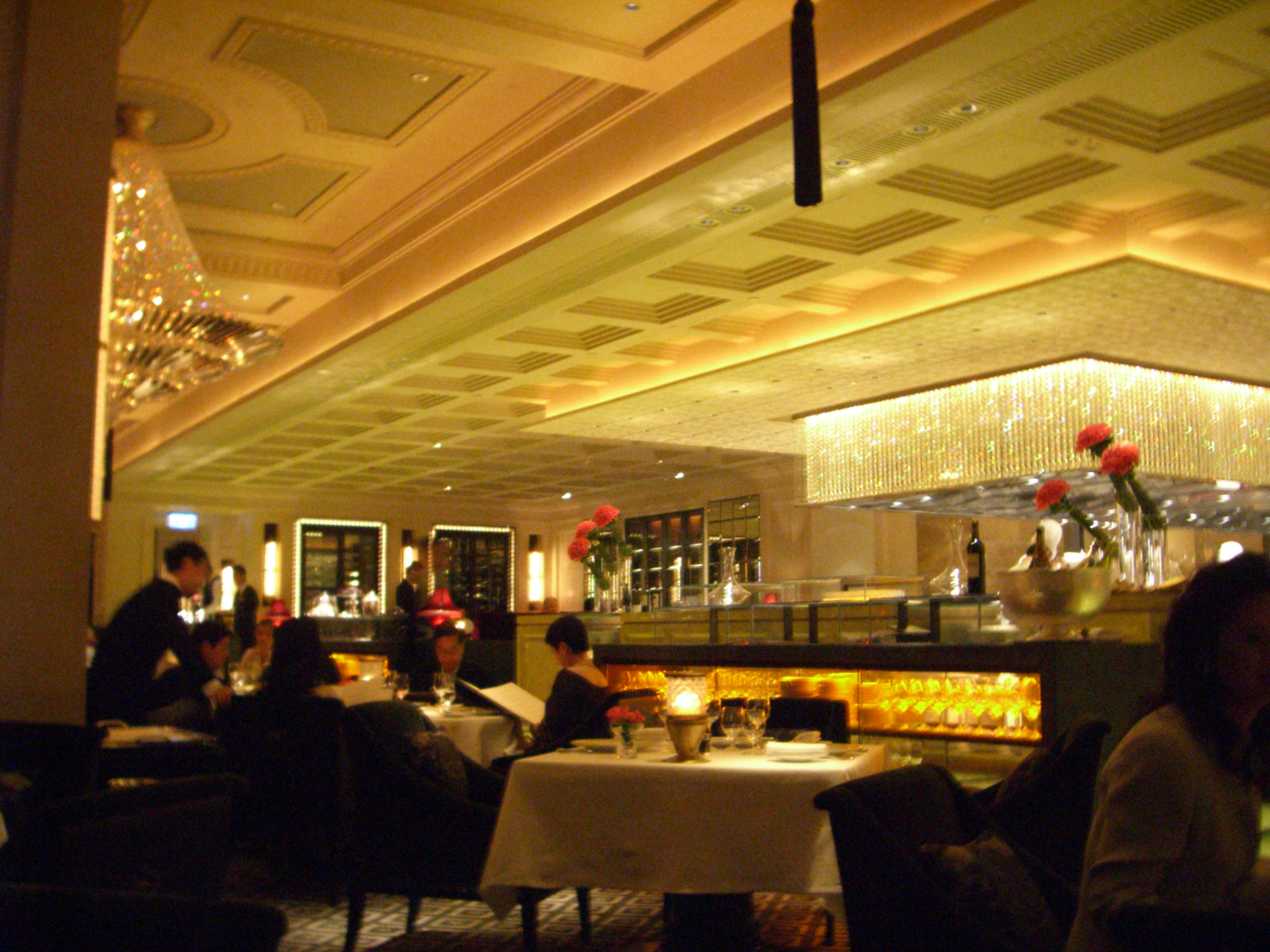
- Caprice at night
- Interactive map of Caprice

Restaurant information
- Head chef: Guillaume Galliot
- Food type: French
- Dress code: Business casual
- Rating: Michelin Guide Hong Kong & Macau
- Location: 8 Finance Street, Four Seasons Hotel Hong Kong, Central, Hong Kong, China
- Coordinates: 22°17′11″N 114°09′24″E
- Seating capacity: 100
- Reservations: Recommended
- Website: FourSeasons.com/.../Caprice

Caprice is a contemporary French haute cuisine restaurant in the Four Seasons Hotel, Hong Kong. It was initially run by chef de cuisine Vincent Thierry, a former sous chef at Le Cinq in the Hotel George V, Paris. Guillaume Galliot is the current chef de cuisine.

== Recognitions ==
The restaurant received two stars in the Michelin Guide's inaugural 2009 Hong Kong and Macau edition. This was followed by the third star in November 2009 for the 2010 edition, which lasted for 4 years until the 2014 edition. Caprice has then been awarded 2 Michelin stars perennially for 5 years. In the 2019 edition, Caprice was awarded 3 Michelin stars again.

The restaurant was listed at no. 5 on Asia's Top 20 Restaurants of the Miele Guide in the 2011/2012 edition. It was also listed at no. 11 for 2008/2009 and no. 10 for 2010/2011, as well as no. 16 in the 2009/2010 edition.

In 2010, it was listed as the 'Best French restaurant' on the Hong Kong Best Eats 2010 list compiled by CNN Travel.

Serves France's famed four year aged Comté cheese.

On 29 April 2013, Caprice was named 73rd in the top 100 restaurants in The World's Best Restaurants Awards.

Caprice is added to Forbes Travel Guide's list of 5 stars restaurants in January 2014.

== See also ==
- List of Michelin 3-star restaurants
- List of Michelin 3-star restaurants in Hong Kong and Macau
- List of Michelin-starred restaurants in Hong Kong and Macau
