= Fook Lam Moon =

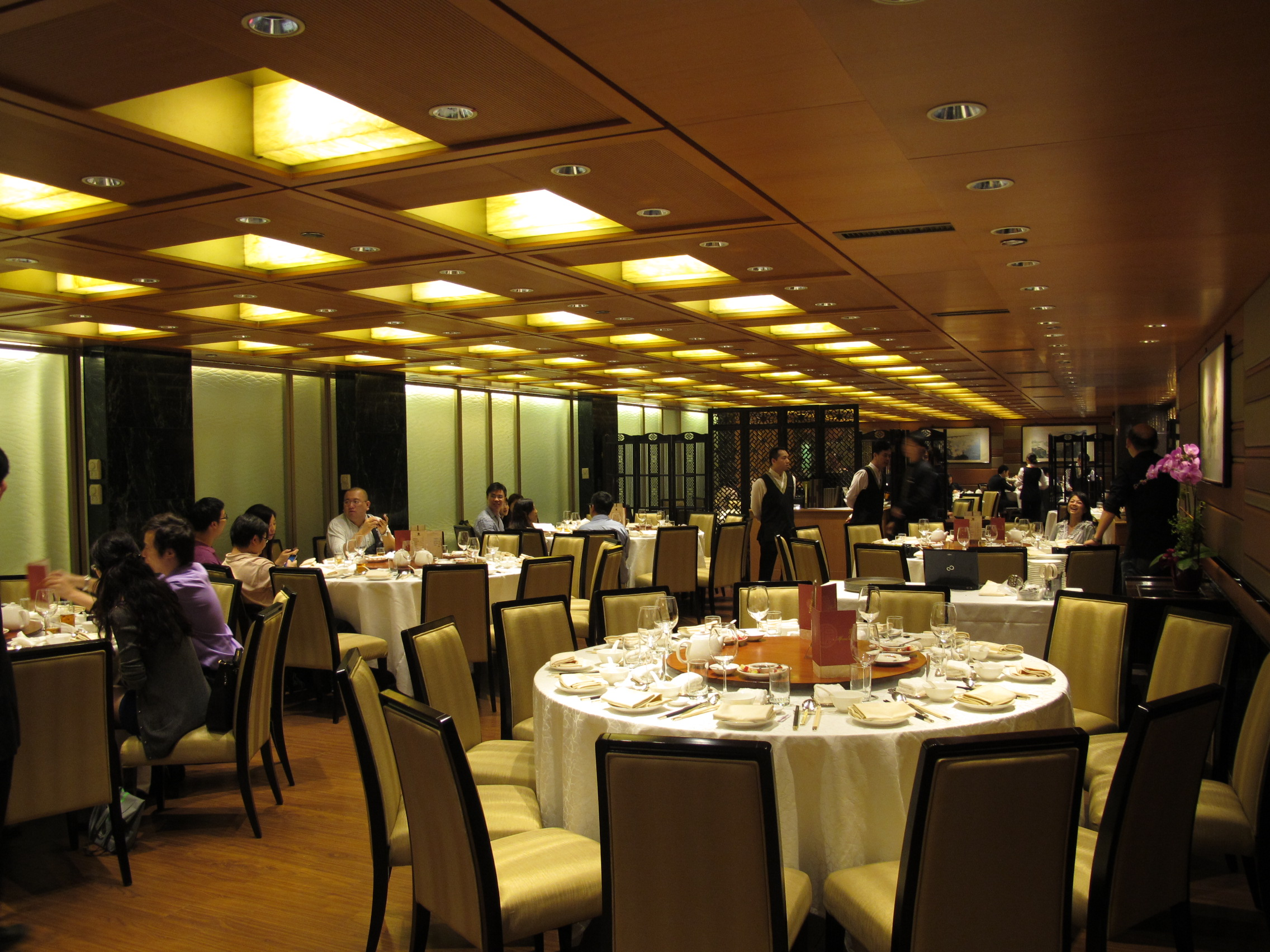
- Fook Lam Moon Restaurant at Wanchai.
- Interactive map of Fook Lam Moon

Restaurant information
- Established: 1948; 78 years ago
- Owners: Chui Pui Kun (Chairman, HK and Kowloon)
- Head chef: Chan Yau Leung
- Food type: Cantonese cuisine, Dim Sum
- Dress code: Smart Casual
- Rating: Michelin Guide Hong Kong & Macau; Fook Lam Moon (Hong Kong) Fook Lam Moon (Kowloon) Asia's Best 50 Restaurants 2013 Asia's Best 50 Restaurants 2014 Asia's Best 50 Restaurants 2015 Asia's Best 50 Restaurants 2016
- Location: 35 Johnston Road, Wanchai, Wanchai, Hong Kong, China
- Reservations: Recommended
- Other locations: Fook Lam Moon (Kowloon), Guo Fu Lou, Fook Lam Moon (Macau)
- Website: http://www.fooklammoon-grp.com/

Fook Lam Moon
- Traditional Chinese: 福臨門
- Simplified Chinese: 福临门
Transcriptions
Standard Mandarin
- Hanyu Pinyin: Fúlínmén
Yue: Cantonese
- Jyutping: fuk1 lam4 mun4

Fook Lam Moon (Chinese: 福臨門) is a Chinese restaurant chain with its main and original branch at 35-45 Johnston Road, Wanchai, Hong Kong. Fook Lam Moon means "fortune and blessings come to your home." The restaurant is often dubbed the Cafeteria for the Wealthy (Chinese: 富豪飯堂) by the media.

== History ==
Born in 1908, founder Chui Fook Chuen became an apprentice at the age of 14 and quickly ascended as a house chef for an ex-bureaucrat of Qing Dynasty residing in Hong Kong. Following this position, he became the head chef for the prominent Ho Tung family. To fulfill his vision of becoming the true master chef for a wider clientele, Chui set up his own catering service "Fook Kee" in 1948. By offering dishes epitomizing the traditions of Cantonese cooking yet with a personal twist, Chui had since set the guiding principles and cemented the fundamentals which Fook Lam Moon uphold throughout the years.

Fook Kee was an instant success, catering to the elites of Hong Kong and it was renamed as Fook Lam Moon in 1953, endowed with the meaning of "good fortune arriving at your door".

Alongside Hong Kong's economic growth and evolution of the culinary industry, the first Fook Lam Moon Restaurant was opened in 1972 in Wanchai, Hong Kong. The Kowloon branch soon followed in 1977, opening in Tsimshatsui.

== Signature dishes ==
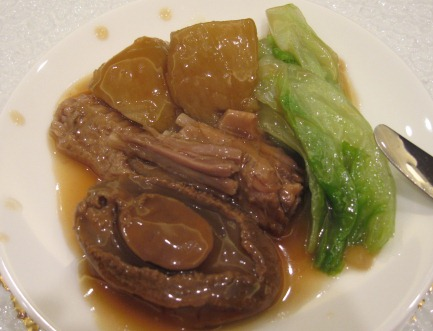
Cooked whole abalone with duck feet and pomelo skin

The restaurant's signature dishes are braised Japanese dried aged abalone with goose web, crispy fried chicken, roast suckling pig, baked stuffed crab meat and onion in shell and a variety of double-boiled soups.

== Recognitions ==
The Wanchai and Tsim Sha Tsui branches of the restaurant were awarded two and one stars, respectively by the 2010 Michelin Guide, following the one star rating in the guide's inaugural 2009 Hong Kong and Macau edition.

It was also listed at no. 18 and 19 on Asia's Top 20 Restaurants of the Miele Guide in the 2008/2009 and 2009/2010 editions, respectively.

Fook Lam Moon was listed 48th in the Asia's Best 50 Restaurants in 2013; and ranked 19th, awarded "Highest Climber" in 2014.
