= Sidney Schutte =

Dutch chef

Sidney Schutte is a Dutch chef. He is the head chef at fine dining restaurant Spectrum, located inside the Waldorf Astoria Amsterdam. Seven months after Schutte became head chef, the restaurant (then named Librije's Zusje) received two Michelin stars; as of March 2026 it has a score of 18.5 Gault Millau points. In late 2017, his restaurant was ranked sixth in the "Lekker500 2018" of Dutch Lekker magazine. Since 2015, he has also operated restaurant Goldfinch Brasserie inside Waldorf Astoria Amsterdam.

Schutte also heads the kitchens at Cocina de Autor and Loto, both restaurants at Grand Velas' Los Cabos resort in Cabo San Lucas, Mexico. His passion for travel is one of the factors that shaped his culinary style. At Cocina de Autor, Schutte aims to create a journey of flavors through a palette of European, Asian, and South American influences. In 2017, it was named one of the best new restaurants by CNN.

== Early life and career ==
Schutte was born in Middelburg, the Netherlands, in 1976. He developed his passion for food and cooking at a young age. He left his hometown at 18, driven by his ambition to become a chef. His training was extensive; he gained experience from chefs in restaurants such as Der Bloasbalg (1 Michelin star) under the guidance of Jan Waghemans, Scholteshof (2 Michelin stars) of Roger Souvereyns, and De Librije (3 Michelin stars) headed by Jonnie Boer. During this period, in 2006, Schutte was recognised as an SVH Meesterkok, the highest recognition that a chef can achieve in the Netherlands.

In 2010, Schutte began working as an executive sous-chef at restaurant Amber in Hong Kong, under the guidance of Richard Ekkebus. In 2012, he was appointed executive chef of The Landmark Mandarin Oriental hotel in Hong Kong. In 2014, Schutte decided to return to the Netherlands to take the position of executive chef in the then soon-to-open Waldorf Astoria Amsterdam. He received several awards throughout his career as an executive chef. In 2017, while managing the kitchen of Librije's Zusje, he was named Chef of the Year by Gault Millau, and was also ranked number 65 on the list of "Best Chefs of the World 2017". In 2017, Schutte served his signature dishes for one month at the Ikarus restaurant in Hangar-7, Salzburg, Austria.

In 2024, Schutte helped create cookbook Groentefeest (Vegetable Feast), to mark the fiftieth anniversary of chain store Dille & Kamille.

== Cooking style ==
Schutte's cooking is characterized by clear, defined flavors and draws primarily on Asian influences. He also presents traditional dishes in a contemporary way, with produce sourced from both local and international suppliers. In the majority of his dishes, he uses seafood.

== Personal life ==
Schutte became the father of twins in 2020, one son and one daughter.
