= Librije's Zusje =

Librije's Zusje can refer to:

- Librije's Zusje (Zwolle), former restaurant with two Michelin stars, closed down 2014
- Librije's Zusje (Amsterdam), restaurant with two Michelin stars (2015).
