= Be My Guest (talk show) =

- Genre: Talk show
- Starring: Hong Kong celebrities, politicians, business entrepreneurs, athletes
- Country of origin: Hong Kong
- Original language: Cantonese

Production
- Running time: approx. 45 minutes

Original release
- Network: Television Broadcasts Limited
- Release: June 3, 2006 – April 17, 2010

Be My Guest (Chinese: 志雲飯局) is a television programme produced by Television Broadcasts Limited in Hong Kong. It is originally broadcast on TVB Lifestyle Channel of TVB Pay Vision in 2006. It is also aired on certain Cathay Pacific flights. TVB released the VCD, DVD, and books. Stephen Chan Chi Wan, General Manager of TVB, is the host of this show and he interviews notable performing celebrities, politicians, business people in Hong Kong. There are also stage and ball shows of the programme but they are not released.

== Format ==
The Chinese name of the show means that the host and the guest chat, while eating at a restaurant. The venue of the interview is different every time based on the choice of the interviewer. The food are usually featured as a quick interruption between the conversations. Many of the episodes feature fusion cuisine.

== List of episodes ==
=== Year 2006 ===
Episode	First broadcast date	Guest	Occupation	Restaurant	Location	Note
1	June 3, 2006	Connie Chan (陳寶珠)	1960's Cantonese opera singer, TV and film actor	Cuisine Cuisine	IFC	
2	June 10, 2006	Dodo Cheng (鄭裕玲)	TV and film actress	Amber	Mandarin Oriental Hotel	
3	June 17, 2006	Kelly Chen (陳慧琳)	Cantopop singer	Angelini's	Kowloon Shangri-La	The first guest to cry on camera
4	June 24, 2006	Andy Lau (劉德華)	Cantopop singer, actor	South Beauty	Lee Theatre Plaza	An awesome episode on one of HK's most recognizable idols. His movie career and his personal views on friendships.
5	July 1, 2006	Joey Yung (容祖兒)	Cantopop singer	Nada Man	Kowloon Shangri-La	
6; 7	July 8, 2006; July 15, 2006	Eric Tsang (曾志偉)	TV and film actor	Lumiere	IFC	
8; 9	July 22, 2006; July 29, 2006	Hacken Lee (李克勤)	TV host, singer	The Steak House Wine Bar & Grill	InterContinental Hotel	
10	August 5, 2006	Lydia Shum (沈殿霞)	TV and film actress	Shanghai Night	Marco Polo Hotel	
11	August 12, 2006	Jan Lamb (林海峰) & Eric Kot (葛民輝)	DJs, singer, actor	Water Margin	Times Square	First (and as of 2008, only) episode featuring two guests. Discussed their rise to fame, their break up reasons, and various other stars that crossed their paths. The episode was full of funny moments, including Jan's meeting of his wife. A must see.
12	August 19, 2006	Leo Ku (古巨基)	Cantopop singer, actor	Sabatini's	Royal Garden Hotel	
13	August 26, 2006	Tina Leung (狄娜)	Leftist film and television actress, businesswoman	Chow Chong Shanghaiese Kitchen	Cyberport	
14	September 2, 2006	Eason Chan (陳奕迅)	Cantopop singer	La Dynastie	Cyberport	
15	September 9, 2006	Liza Wang (汪明荃)	TV actress	Hunan Garden	Exchange Square	
16	September 16, 2006	Miriam Yeung (楊千嬅)	Cantopop singer, actress	Scala	New World Renaissance Harbour View Hotel	
17	September 23, 2006	Donald Tsang (曾蔭權)	Colonial government official, 2nd Chief Executive of Hong Kong	Petrus	Island Shangri-La	First episode featuring a prominent government official
18	September 30, 2006	Michael Hui (許冠文)	Film actor	Ming Court	Langham Place Hotel	
19	October 7, 2006	Adam Cheng (鄭少秋)	TV and film actor, singer	Prince's Restaurant	One Peking	
20	October 14, 2006	Ekin Cheng (鄭伊健)	Cantopop singer, actor	Ginza Japanese Restaurant	New World Centre	
21	October 21, 2006	Anthony Wong Chau Sang (黃秋生)	Actor, film director	Kung Tak Lam	One Peking	Anthony had a harsh life growing up, wasn't able to finish school and got a break in movies. His marriage has been shakey at times.
22	October 28, 2006	Kenny Bee (鍾鎮濤)	Cantopop and English pop singer, actor	Thai Mary	City Golf Club	
23	November 4, 2006	Jenny Tseng (甄妮)	Singer, actress	Nicholini's	Conrad Hong Kong	
24	November 12, 2006	Jimmy Lai (黎智英)	Businessman, owner of Next Media	Nam Fong	Le Méridien Cyberport	Episode ran for 1.5 hours, instead of the normal 1 hour
25	November 19, 2006	Natalis Chan (陳百祥)	Actor, singer	Farm House No. 8	Sunning Road, Causeway Bay	
26	November 26, 2006	Michelle Reis (李嘉欣)	Actress	Pearl on the Peak	Peak Tower	
27	December 2, 2006	Charmaine Sheh (佘詩曼)	Cantopop singer, television actress	Shang Palace	Kowloon Shangri-La	
28	December 9, 2006	Kevin Cheng (鄭嘉穎)	Cantopop singer, television actor	Zeffirino	Regal Hotels International	
29	December 16, 2006	Gigi Leung (梁詠琪)	Cantopop Singer, actress	The Mistral	InterContinental Grand Stanford Hong Kong	Went through how she started her career and her relationship with Ekin Cheng. Also talked about her family life and her upbringing.

=== Year 2007 ===
Episode	First broadcast date	Guest	Occupation	Restaurant	Location	Note
30	April 7, 2007	George Lam (林子祥)	actor and singer	Avenue Joffre	9-11 Kingston Street, Causeway Bay	Originally scheduled to air on 23 December 2006, but airing was delayed. The interview was shorter than usual, due to a rumoured walkout by Lam as protest over questions about his personal life.
31	May 26, 2007	Henry Tang (唐英年)	Chief Secretary of Administration	Man Wah	Mandarin Oriental, Central	
32	June 2, 2007	Albert Leung (林夕)	Lyricist	Les Célébrités	Hotel Nikko	
33	June 9, 2007	Louise Li (李司棋)	Actress	Wedding Hall 9	Hotel Miramar	
34	June 16, 2007	Selina Chow (周梁淑怡)	Legco member	Zeffirino	Regal Hotels International	
35	June 23, 2007	Anita Yuen (袁詠儀)	Actress	Riva	Causeway Bay, Park Lane HK	A former Miss HK and her rise to fame in the movie industry. Her quick rise to stardom and her independent views leading to a "freeze" in her career. Her relationship with Chi Lam and family life.
36	June 30, 2007	Lee Lai Shan (李麗珊)	Olympic medalist and windsurfer	Shanghai Shanghai	Ritz-Carlton	
37	July 7, 2007	Michelle Yim (米雪)	Actress	Golden Bauhinia	Hong Kong Convention and Exhibition Centre	
38	July 14, 2007	Lam San-san (林珊珊)	Manager	Inagiku	Four Seasons Hotel Hong Kong	
39	July 21, 2007	Peter Lam (林建岳)	Media Asia CEO	China Club	Bank of China building	
40	July 28, 2007	Nancy Sit (薛家燕)	Actress	Harbour Grill	Harbour Plaza Hotel, Hung Hom	
41	August 4, 2007	Deborah Lai (狄波拉)	Actress	Isola Bar & Grill	International Finance Centre	
42	August 11, 2007	Idy Chan (陳玉蓮)	Actress	Cyberport		
43	August 18, 2007	Cally Kwong (鄺美雲)	former Miss Hong Kong	Happy Valley Racecourse		
44	August 25, 2007	Lawrence Ng Wai Kwok (伍衛國)	Actor	Wharney Guang Dong Hotel	Wan Chai	
45	September 1, 2007	Priscilla Chan (陳慧嫻)	Singer	Luxe Manor Hotel	Tsim Sha Tsui Kimberley Street	
46	September 8, 2007	Paco Wong (黃柏高)	Manager		International Finance Centre	Talked about how many of today's Cantopop stars were discovered, and who had the potential to be the next superstar. Faye Wong was mentioned as the one superstar that he wasn't able to sign. At that time her contract was even higher than what his deep-pocketed record label could afford.
47	September 15, 2007	Patrick Tse Yin (謝賢)	Actor	Royal Plaza Hotel HK	Mong Kok	
48	September 22, 2007	Mani Fok (霍汶希)	Manager	Wasabisabi	Time Square	Talked about how Twins, the Cantopop duo was formed.
49	September 29, 2007	Wong Jing (王晶)	Film director, producer, actor, presenter, and screenwriter	Eaton Hotel Hong Kong		Talked about his movies, his relationships, and his views on the Chinese movie industry
50	October 6, 2007	Ang Lee (李安)	Director	Hutong Hong Kong	Peking Road	
51	October 13, 2007	Ronald Arculli (夏佳理)	ExCo member and barrister	Ritz-Carlton		
52	October 20, 2007	Andy Hui (許志安)	Actor and singer	Morton's Steakhouse	Sheraton Hong Kong	
53	October 27, 2007	Michael Miu (苗僑偉)	Actor	Metropark Hotel Causeway Bay		
54	November 3, 2007	Dayo Wong (黃子華)	Comedian	CITIC Tower		
55	November 10, 2007	Lawrence Cheng (鄭丹瑞)	Actor and MC	Oyster & Wine Bar	Sheraton Hotel	
56	November 17, 2007	Ray Lui (呂良偉)	Actor	Ingredients restaurant	Wan Chai	
57	November 24, 2007	Ng Yu (吳雨)	Producer		Elements Mall	
58	December 1, 2007	Moses Chan (陳豪)	Actor	The Excelsior	Causeway Bay	
59	December 8, 2007	Harlem Yu (庾澄慶)	Singer/songwriter	Cafe Corner	TVB City	
60	December 15, 2007	Jet Li (李連杰)	Actor, Martial artist, International superstar	The Grand VIP House	Elements, Hong Kong	
61	December 22, 2007	Chim Pui Chung (詹培忠)	LegCo member	Ming Court	Cordis Hong Kong	
62	December 29, 2007	Sandra Lang (仙杜拉)	Singer	Grand Hyatt HK	Wan Chai	

=== Year 2008 ===
Episode	First broadcast date	Guest	Occupation	Restaurant	Location	Note
63	January 5, 2008	Gigi Lai (黎姿)	Actress	Cinecitta	Wan Chai	
64-65	January 12, 2008	Regina Ip (葉劉淑儀)	Politician	D Diamon	Elements Mall	
66	January 26, 2008	Susanna Kwan (關菊英)	Actress	La Cuisine de Mekong	Knutsford Terrace	
67	March 1, 2008	Prudence Liew (劉美君)	Singer	The Royal Pacific Hotel	Tsim Sha Tsui	
68	March 8, 2008	David Lui (呂方)	Singer	Misto	Granville Road	
69	March 15, 2008	Vincent Zhao (趙文卓)	Actor			
70	March 22, 2008	Teresa Carpio (杜麗莎)	Actress			
71	March 29, 2008	Sylvia Chang (張艾嘉)	Actress			
72	April 5, 2008	Lowell Lo (盧冠廷)	Composer and actor			
73	April 12, 2008	Shirley Kwan (關淑怡)	Singer			
74-75	April 19, 2008; April 26, 2008	Karen Mok (莫文蔚)	Singer			She talked about her relationship with Stephen Chow as well as her family's interest in the Tui bei tu.
76	May 3, 2008	Michael Tien (田北辰)	District Officer	Joia	Tsim Sha Tsui	
77	May 10, 2008	Roger Kwok (郭晉安)	Actor			
78	May 17, 2008	Rita Fan (范徐麗泰)	Legco President			
79-80	May 24, 2008; May 31, 2008	Joyce Cheng (鄭欣宜)	Actress			
81	June 7, 2008	Albert Cheng (鄭經翰)	Former Legco member and commentator			
82	June 14, 2008	Maria Lee 李曾超群	Entrepreneur; Owner of Maria's Bakery			
83	June 21, 2008	Kent Cheng (鄭則士)	Actor			
84-85	June 28, 2008	Ronny Yu (于仁泰)	Director, writer and producer			
86	July 12, 2008	Kenneth Ko (高文安)	Designer			
87	July 19, 2008	Xia Yu (夏雨)	Actor			
88	July 26, 2008	Maggie Cheung (張可頤)	Actress			
89	August 2, 2008	Maggie Cheung (張可頤)	Actress			
90	August 9, 2008	Gallen Lo (羅嘉良)	Actor			
91-92	August 16, 2008; August 16, 2008	Athena Chu (朱茵)	Actress			
93	August 30, 2008	Ng Kwun-lai (吳君麗)	Actress			
94	September 6, 2008	Andrew Lau (劉偉強)	Director	Lan Kwai Fong hotel VIP Lounge	Lan Kwai Fong	
95	September 13, 2008	Emily Lau (劉慧卿)	Politician	La Mer Brasserie		
96	September 20, 2008	Cecil Chao (趙世曾)	Chairman			
97	September 27, 2008	Lee Heung Kam (李香琴)	Actress			
98-99	October 4, 2008; October 11, 2008	Tony Ching (程小東)	Director			
100	October 18, 2008	Paul Chun (秦沛)	Actor	Finds Restaurant		
101-102	October 25, 2008; November 1, 2008	Sandra Ng (吳君如)	Actress	Azure Restaurant		
103	November 8, 2008	Thomas Fung (馮永發)	President of Fairchild Group in Canada	Lavilla 38	Causeway Bay	
104	November 15, 2008	Donnie Yen (甄子丹)	Actor	Chez Patrick Restaurant	Wan Chai	
105	November 22, 2008	Dene Chung (鍾尚志)	Former president of Faculty of Medicine			
106	November 29, 2008	Bobby Au-Yeung (歐陽震華)	Actor			
107	December 6, 2008	Wayne Lai (黎耀祥)	Actor			
108	December 13, 2008	Joyce Koi (蓋鳴暉)	Actress			
109-110	December 20, 2008; December 27, 2008	Mark Lui (雷頌德)	Composer	D. Diamond Restaurant & Bar	Tsim Sha Tsui	

=== Year 2009 ===
Episode	First broadcast date	Guest	Occupation	Restaurant	Location	Note
111	January 3, 2009	Lin Chi-ling (林志玲)	Taiwan Supermodel		Tsim Sha Tsui	
112	January 10, 2009	John Woo (吳宇森)	Director			
113 - 114	January 17, 2009; January 24, 2009	Raymond Wong (黃百鳴)	Actor			A humorous double episode where Raymond describes the evolution on the HK film industry and his roller coaster ride in his career.
115	February 14, 2009	Ricky Wong (王維基)	Entrepreneur; former CEO of Asia Television			A meeting between executives of rival stations ATV and TVB
116	February 21, 2009	Chua Lam (蔡瀾)	Food critic	Fu Ho Restaurant (富豪酒家)	Tsim Sha Tsui	
117	February 28, 2009	Liu Jia-chang (劉家昌)	Composer			
118	March 7, 2009	Gillian Chung (鍾欣桐)	Singer			Talked extensively about her private life including the Edison Chen photo scandal
119	March 14, 2009	Hacken Lee, Miriam Yeung, Andy Hui, Athena Chu, Gallen Lo, David Lui	Singers and actors			Special episode extending 90 mins longer
120	March 21, 2009	Rebecca Lee (李樂詩)	Explorer	Zenses Cristal Bar	Central	
121	March 28, 2009	Grasshopper (草蜢)	Musical group			
122	April 4, 2009	Chung King-fai (鍾景輝)	Actor	Ana oyster & Grill	Causeway Bay	
123	April 11, 2009	Michael Tse (謝天華)	Actor	Tiffany's New york bar	Tsim Sha Tsui	
124	April 18, 2009	Annie Yi (伊能靜)	Actress	Hennessy Room	Admiralty	
125	May 30, 2009	Sheren Tang (鄧萃雯)	Actress			
126	June 6, 2009	Nick Cheung (張家輝)	Actor			
127	June 13, 2009	Wong Yuk-Long (黃玉郎)	Artist, Actor, Publisher	Rosedale on the Park (珀麗酒店)	Causeway Bay	
128	June 20, 2009	Helena Law (羅蘭)	Actress			
129	June 27, 2009	Bernard Chan (陳智思)	Politician and Businessman			
130	July 4, 2009	Elliot Ngok (岳華)	Actor	Knutstord Steak Chop & Oyster Bar	Tsim Sha Tsui	
131	July 11, 2009	Dave Wong (王傑)	Singer			
132	July 18, 2009	Richard Ng (吳耀漢)	Comedian			
133	July 25, 2009	Felix Wong (黃日華)	Actor			
134	August 1, 2009	Gary Chaw (曹格)	Singer			
135	August 8, 2009	James Tien (田北俊)	Politician			
136	August 15, 2009	(李添勝)	Producer			
137	August 22, 2009	Cho Yan-chiu (曹仁超)	Director of Hong Kong Economic Journal			
138-139	August 29, 2009; September 5, 2009	Elisa Chan (陳潔靈)	Singer			
140	September 12, 2009	Chiu Tsang-hei (趙增熹)	Composer			
141	September 19, 2009	Miriam Yeung (楊千嬅)	Singer			
142	September 26, 2009	Law Kar-ying (羅家英)	Actor			
143	October 3, 2009	Peter So (蘇民峰)	Fung-shui sifu			
144	October 10, 2009	Yonfan (楊凡)	Director			
145	October 17, 2009	Frances Yip (葉麗儀)	Singer			
146-147	October 24, 2009; October 31, 2009	So Se-wong (蘇施黃)	TV host			
148	November 7, 2009	Frederick Ma (馬時亨)	Former Secretary for Commerce and Economic Development			
149	November 14, 2009	Mabel Cheung (張婉婷)	Director			
150	November 21, 2009	Lam Chiu-ying (林超英)	Head of Hong Kong Observatory			
151	November 28, 2009	Shih Wing-ching (施永青)	Businessman			
152	December 5, 2009	Jaime Chik (戚美珍)	Actress			

=== Year 2010 ===
Episode	First broadcast date	Guest	Occupation	Restaurant	Location	Note
153	January 2, 2010	Susan Tse (謝雪心)	Actress			Confucius descendant
154	January 16, 2010	Monica Chan (陳法蓉)	Actress, Miss Hong Kong 1989			
155	February 6, 2010	Dicky Cheung (張衛健)	Actor			
156	March 13, 2010	Twins	Singers			Occurred at the time of 2010 TVB corruption scandal. Highlight of the show was when Mani Fok surprised the audience and came out from behind camera to rescue Twins from Stephen's questions.
157	March 20, 2010	Kara Hui (惠英紅)	Actress			
158	March 27, 2010	Steven Lo (羅傑承)	Macau Businessman			
159	April 10, 2010	Katie Chan (陳復生)	Former actress			
160	April 17, 2010	May Fung (馮美基)				
