= Librije's Zusje (Zwolle) =

Coordinates: 52°30′54.87″N 6°5′51.36″E

Librije’s Zusje
- Interactive map of Librije’s Zusje

Restaurant information
- Established: 2008
- Food type: Local, French, International
- Rating: Michelin Guide
- Location: Spinhuisplein 1, Zwolle, 8011 ZZ, Netherlands
- Seating capacity: 40
- Website: Official website

Librije's Zusje (English:Librijes Little Sister) was a restaurant in Zwolle, Netherlands. It was a fine dining restaurant that was awarded one Michelin star in 2009, which it retained until 2011. It was awarded two stars from 2012 to 2014.

The restaurant was owned by Jonnie and Thérèse Boer and was part of the culinary group around De Librije. It was housed in a former women's prison, which it shared with Librije's Hotel and Librije's Atelier, a cookery and wine school.

Head chef was originally Sidney Schutte. After the departure of Schutte in 2009, Alwin Leemhuis took over. Leemhuis left in 2012 and was succeeded by Maik Kuijpers

On 1 May 2014 the second sister of De Librije opened in Amsterdam. This restaurant, also named Librije's Zusje is located in the Waldorf Astoria Hotel. On 14 September 2014 it was announced that Librije's Zusje (Zwolle) would close on 31 December 2014 and that De Librije would take over the location.

== See also ==
- List of Michelin starred restaurants in the Netherlands
