= Cocina de Autor =

Restaurants in resorts in Mexico

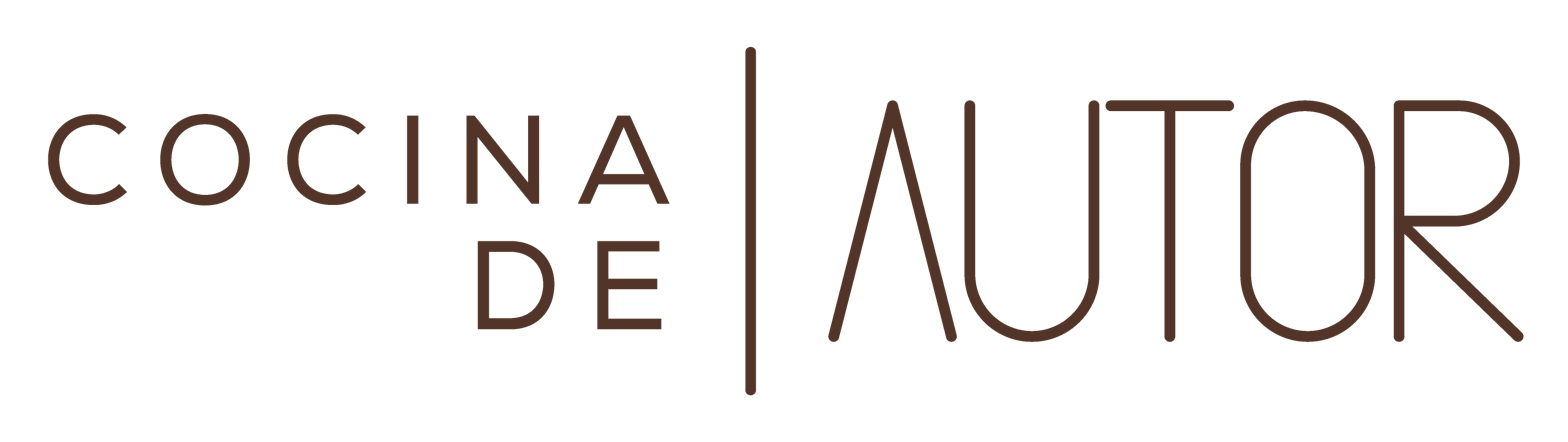

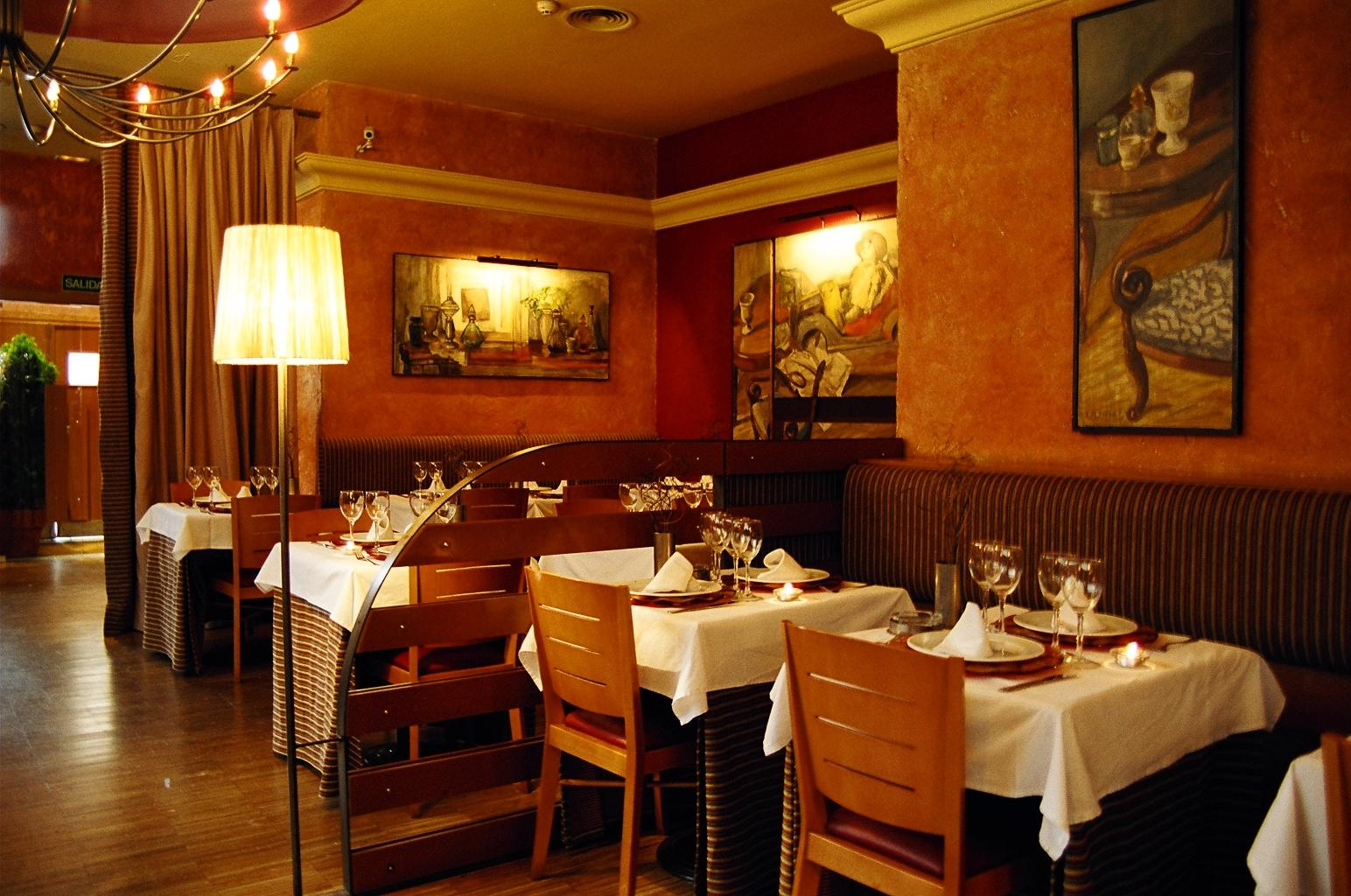
- The Riviera Maya restaurant in 2010

Restaurant information
- Established: 2008 (Riviera Maya); November 2016 (Los Cabos)
- Owner: Grand Velas Resorts
- Head chef: Nahúm Velasco (Riviera Maya); Francisco Sixtos (Los Cabos); Sidney Schutte (Los Cabos)
- Chef: Mikel Alonso (Riviera Maya); Bruno Oteiza (Riviera Maya)
- Food type: Creative
- Dress code: Business casual (Los Cabos); Smart casual (Riviera Maya)
- Rating: (both, Michelin Guide, 2024); AAA Five Diamond Award (both, 2024)
- Location: Carretera Cancún–Tulum, Km 62, Riviera Maya (20°40′28″N 87°01′24″W); Carretera Transpeninsular, Km 17, Los Cabos Corridor (22°58′04″N 109°47′31″W), 77710 (Riviera Maya); 23405 (Los Cabos), Mexico
- Reservations: Yes (both)
- Other locations
- Other information: Adults and minors over 12 years old (Riviera Maya); Adults over 18 years old (Los Cabos)
- Website: grandvelas.com

Cocina de Autor is a Mexican restaurant brand located within the all-inclusive Grand Velas Resorts. The restaurant marque operates at the Riviera Maya and Los Cabos Corridor establishments, in Quintana Roo and Baja California Sur, respectively. Cocina de Autor offers creative cuisine prepared with dishes made with ingredients from various regions. In 2024, Nahúm Velasco served as the head chef at the Riviera Maya location, while Francisco Sixtos and Sidney Schutte led at the Los Cabos resort.

Both restaurants have received positive feedback from food and travel reviewers. In 2024, each was awarded one Michelin star in the inaugural Michelin Guide covering restaurants in Mexico. Grand Velas is the only all-inclusive resort brand in the world to host two Michelin-starred restaurants. Additionally, both locations received the Five Diamond Award from the American Automobile Association (AAA).

== History and description ==
Businessman Eduardo Vela Ruiz owned Grand Velas Resorts, an all-inclusive resort company in Mexico, until his death in 2023. During his lifetime, the brand opened at three coastline locations: Riviera Maya, Quintana Roo, Riviera Nayarit, Nayarit, and Los Cabos Corridor, Baja California Sur.

The resorts operate independently. Guests pay a nightly rate that includes access to all amenities, such as pools, spas, and restaurants. Grand Velas Riviera Maya has eight standalone restaurants, including Cocina de Autor. The restaurant is also one of the seven dining venues at the Los Cabos resort. The name translates to "signature cuisine", a concept that reflects a chef's personal culinary vision. Consequently, food and travel reviewers label the brand's cuisine as "creative".

Both restaurants offer an eight- to ten-course tasting menu. The Riviera Maya establishment welcomes guests aged 12 and older and has a smart casual dress code. The Los Cabos diner is open to guests aged 18 and older, with a business casual dress code. Reservations are required at both locations.

When the Michelin Guide debuted in 2024 in Mexico, it awarded 18 eateries with Michelin stars. Each location of Cocina de Autor received one star, denoting "high-quality cooking, worth a stop". Grand Velas is the only all-inclusive resort brand in the world to offer two Michelin-starred restaurants.

Each location of the restaurant brand also received the Five Diamond Award from the American Automobile Association (AAA), becoming the first restaurant within an all-inclusive resort to earn the rating.

== Riviera Maya ==
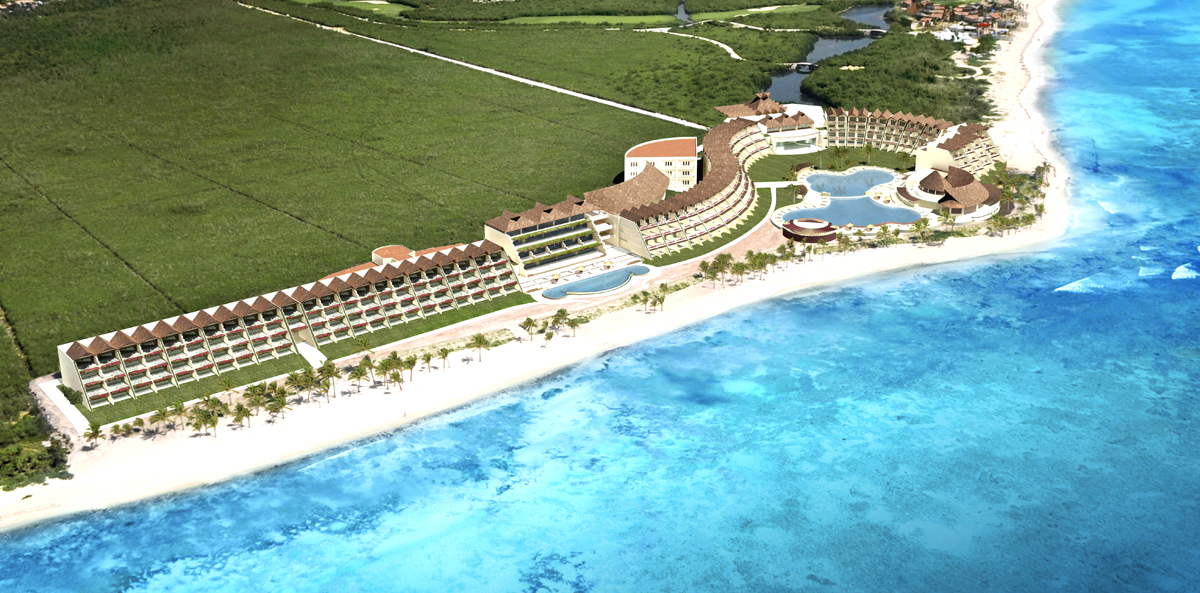
Grand Velas Riviera Maya is home to one of the restaurants

The Riviera Maya resort began operations in 2008 in Solidaridad Municipality, Quintana Roo. Cocina de Autor opened alongside the resort, with Xavier Pérez Stone serving as its first head chef. Nahúm Velasco became the head chef of Cocina de Autor in 2024. He studied at the Centro Culinario Ambrosía in Mexico City and worked as a chef at Cocina de Autor, Geranium, and Passion before returning to the first one.

Cocina de Autor Riviera Maya features dishes inspired by Mikel Alonso and Bruno Oteiza, chefs from Biko in Mexico City, who also collaborate at the restaurant. Meagan Drillinger wrote for Travel Weekly that the restaurant's menu is updated regularly, with options that have included spider crab with jackfruit; roasted pork with black garlic; and Cocina de Autor's own Melipona honey. Isabel Leal from Robb Report México visited the resort during its Sensory Voyage festival. She was presented with gazpacho, smoked whipped cream, chicharrón, Australian wagyu with figs, Ossetra caviar, scallops, fricassee, and venison with a crust of raisins and coffee, served with a pine nut and cinnamon sauce. The Michelin Guide mentioned that the menu "emphasizes novel flavor combinations and compelling textures".

== Los Cabos ==
Grand Velas Resorts launched the Los Cabos resort in November 2016 in the municipality of the same name in Baja California Sur. Francisco Sixtos and Sidney Schutte are the executive chefs of Cocina de Autor. Sixtos was born in Guadalajara, Jalisco, and has worked at the kitchens of Le Méridien, Hyatt and Carlyle hotels. Schutte is a Dutch chef and the head of Spectrum, a Michelin two-star restaurant in Amsterdam as of 2024. Schutte also heads Loto, another restaurant in Grand Velas Los Cabos. Schutte described his cuisine as being "distinctive for its outspoken [flavors] that pop".

Drillinger described its dishes, such as scallops with miso butter and beef tenderloin with celery root purée, poached beetroots, and maitake mushrooms. Further, she mentioned that the restaurant "takes diners on a culinary journey, with a dimly lit, sumptuous dining room to set the scene". Becca Hensley of Elite Traveler highlighted additional menu options like Australian wagyu with smoked parmesan and figs, oysters in its shell served in green apple aguachile, and fig and arbequina juice. Alan Nájera wrote for El Universal that he enjoyed giant oysters from Comondú served with green apple aguachile, cucumber and a tempura crisp, longfin yellowtail served with daikon slices, accompanied by nixtamal and a cilantro-habanero sauce, shiitake mushroom, pecan, and jicama tetela, drizzled with corn velouté, and a piece of sliced beet in sauce, on a sourdough base, topped with smoked almond zabaglione and black sesame.

CNN named Cocina de Autor Los Cabos one of the best new restaurants in 2017. Forbes Travel Guide awarded it four out of five stars, noting that while fine dining is uncommon at all-inclusive resort, the restaurant "redefines the art of vacation dining". The Michelin Guide mentioned that the terrace "is a nice spot for bites and cocktails, and a few choice tables overlook a koi pond". According to Nájera, following the restaurant's Michelin star recognition, it began accepting reservations from the general public, no longer requiring guests to stay at the resort.

== See also ==
- List of Michelin-starred restaurants in Mexico
