= Regal Constellation Hotel =

Hotel in Toronto, Ontario, Canada

Coordinates: 43.6874°N 79.5944°W

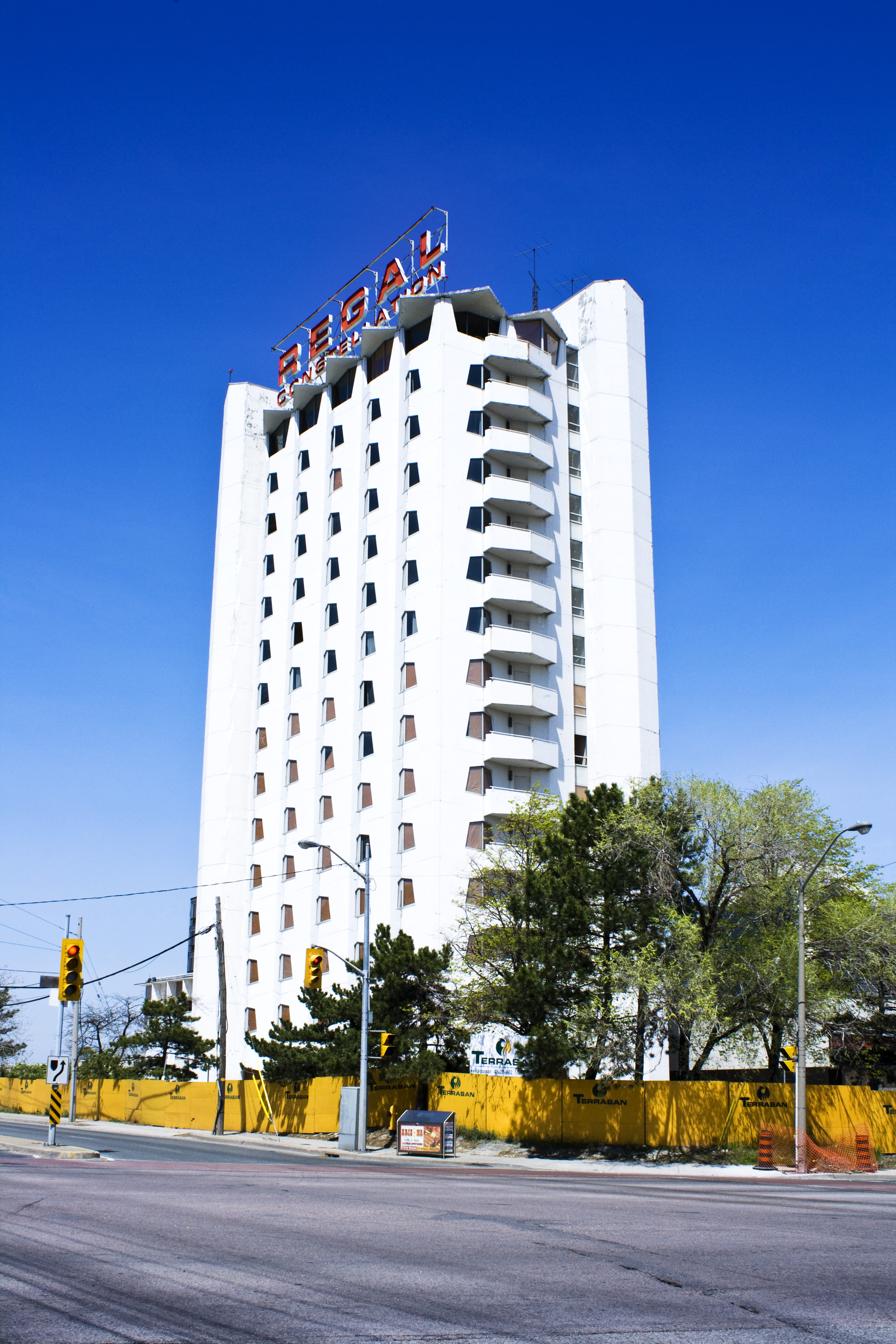
- Regal Constellation as of May 2009
- Interactive map of Regal Constellation Hotel
- Location: 900 Dixon Rd, Toronto, ON M9W 1J7, CA
- Owner: Hospitality Investors Group

Construction
- Opened: 1962
- Closed: November 2007
- Demolished: January 2012

The Regal Constellation Hotel was a hotel in the administrative district of Etobicoke in Toronto, Ontario, Canada, located close to Pearson International Airport. Open from 1962 to 2007, it was focused on trade shows, conventions and hospitality training. The building was demolished in 2012.

== History ==
Founded by Benjamin Dunkelman and Alex Hacker in 1962 as a 5-storey 150-room hotel named the "Constellation Hotel" (which included an elegant fine dining room named the Burgandy Room as well as the Banyan Terrace and the Woodbine Lounge), the hotel eventually consisted of two 15-floor towers, 6-storey atrium, a Chinese restaurant, a movie theatre, and 90,000 square feet (8,400 m^{2}) of convention space. In the 1980s a video game arcade was added near the movie theatre. Renovations took place in 2001.

The tower shown in the photo to the right (known as the International Tower) was added in late 1965.

From late 1965 to 1972 the hotel was owned in equal shares by Alex Hacker and George Kalmar, with Alex Hacker serving as President until 1974 (prior to that, in 1972 Alex Hacker sold his share in the hotel to a group organized by George Kalmar, who in turn sold his share in 1989).

Once a popular hotel and convention venue, the hotel closed due to declining business and other setbacks, culminating with the SARS crisis. The last owner of the hotel as an operating business was Hong Kong–based Regal Hotels International.

In 2004, Hospitality Investors Group (HIG) of Scottsdale, Arizona, acquired the site and was planning to add a 350-room hotel to the existing 800-room hotel. Construction was planned to begin in 2005. However, following the acquisition, HIG was broken up and one of its chief officers formed a new organization, Alatau Hospitality, with the principal shareholders of Lancaster Group of Kazakhstan. Alatau Hospitality retained the domain name of HIG (hospitalityinvestors.com), however its web site did not list the hotel as one of its current construction projects. As of November 2007, it was not clear who owned the property.

On 15 July 2011, Urbacon was given the contract to demolish the former hotel. The property was then sold to Park'N Fly Canada. The former hotel structure was fully razed by January 2012.

== Gallery: Abandoned, October 2007 ==
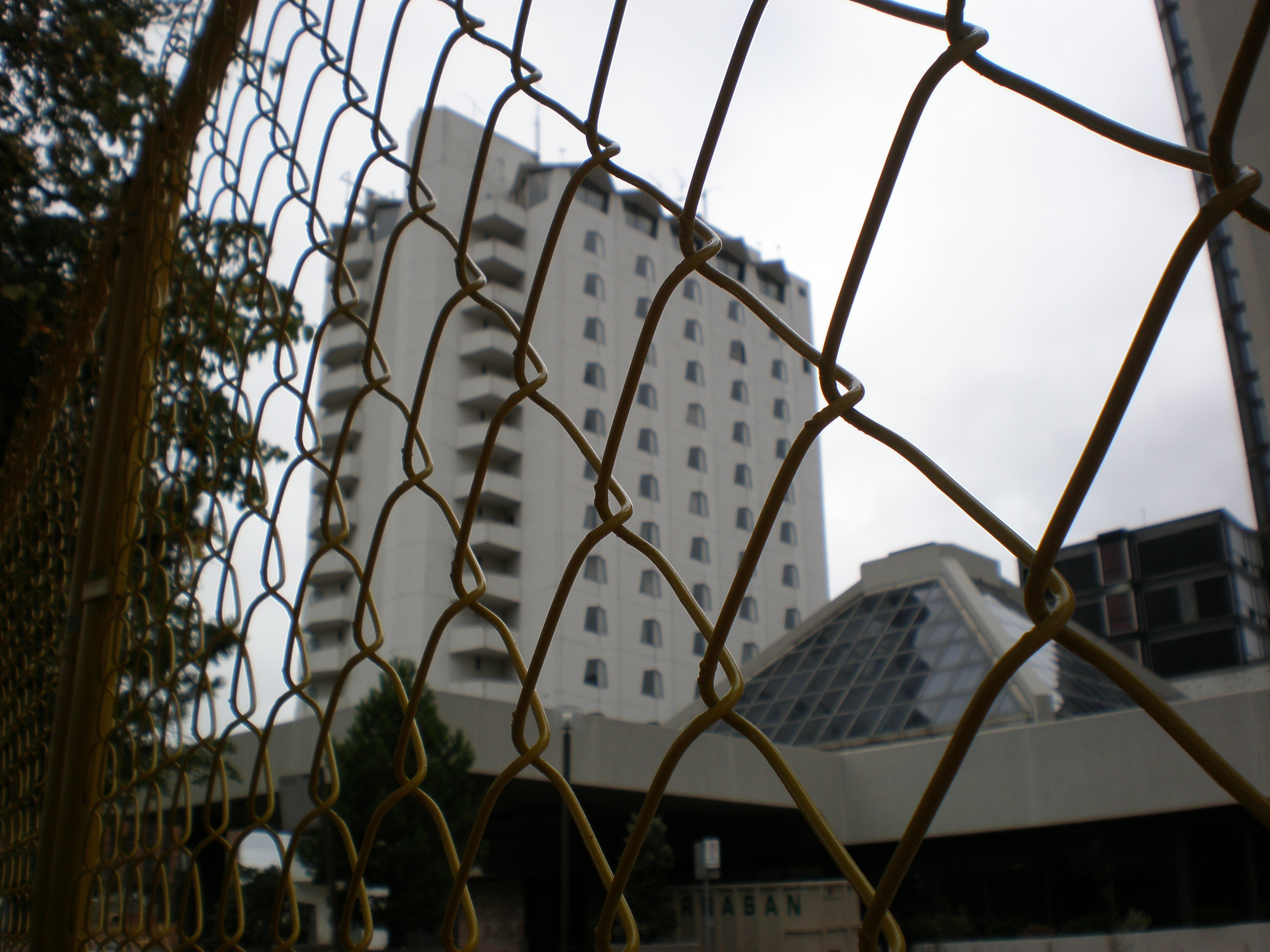

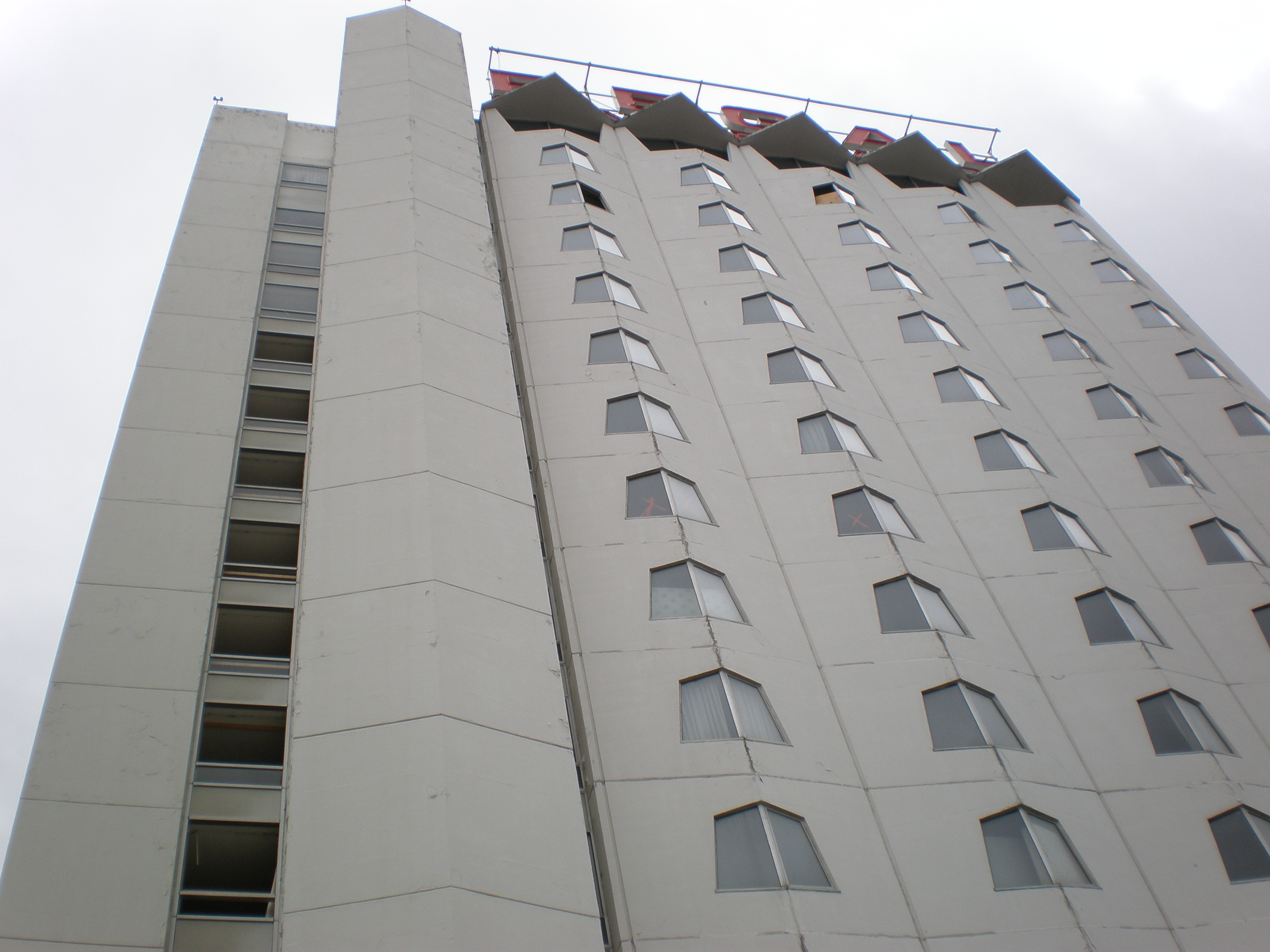

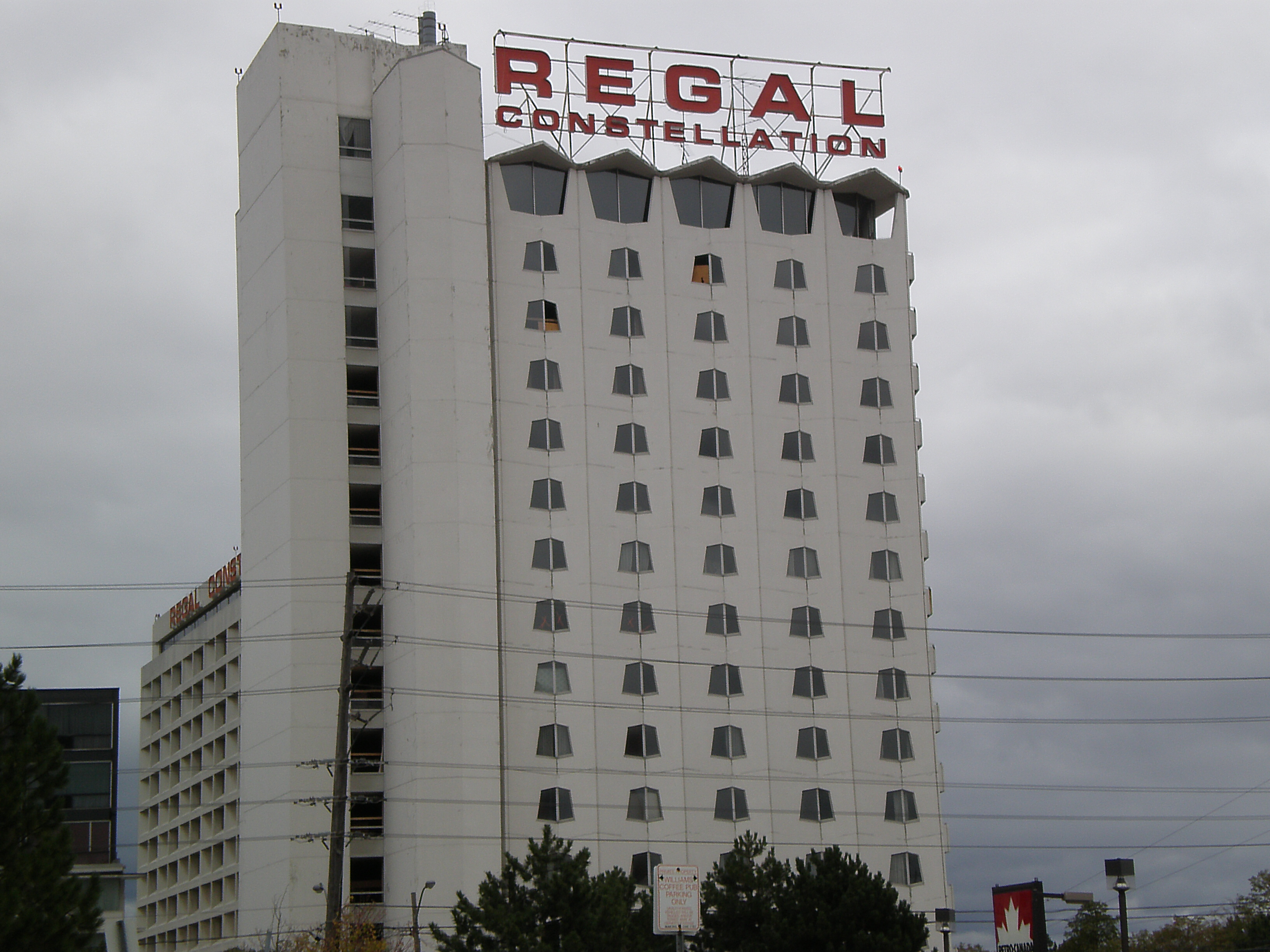

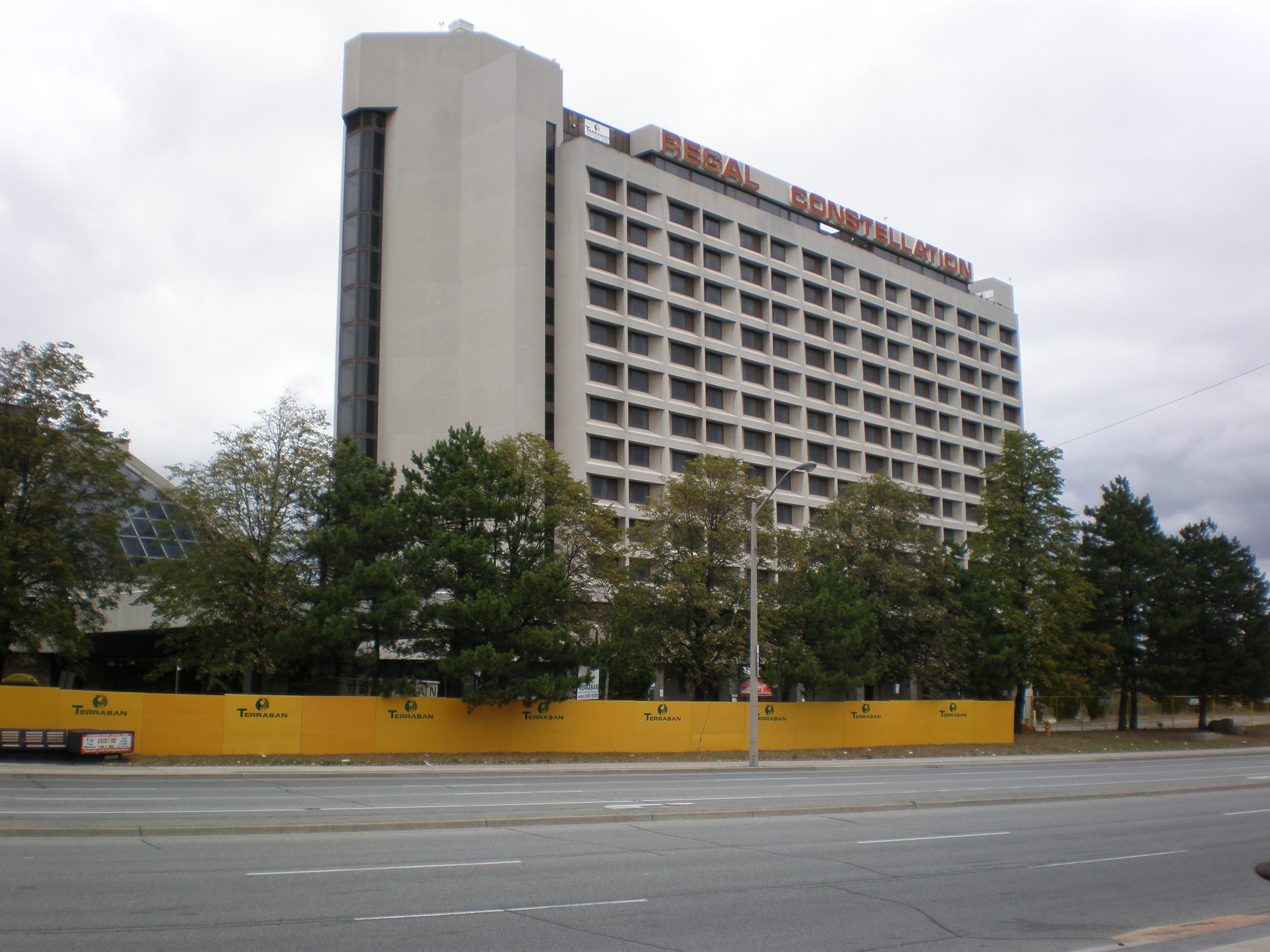

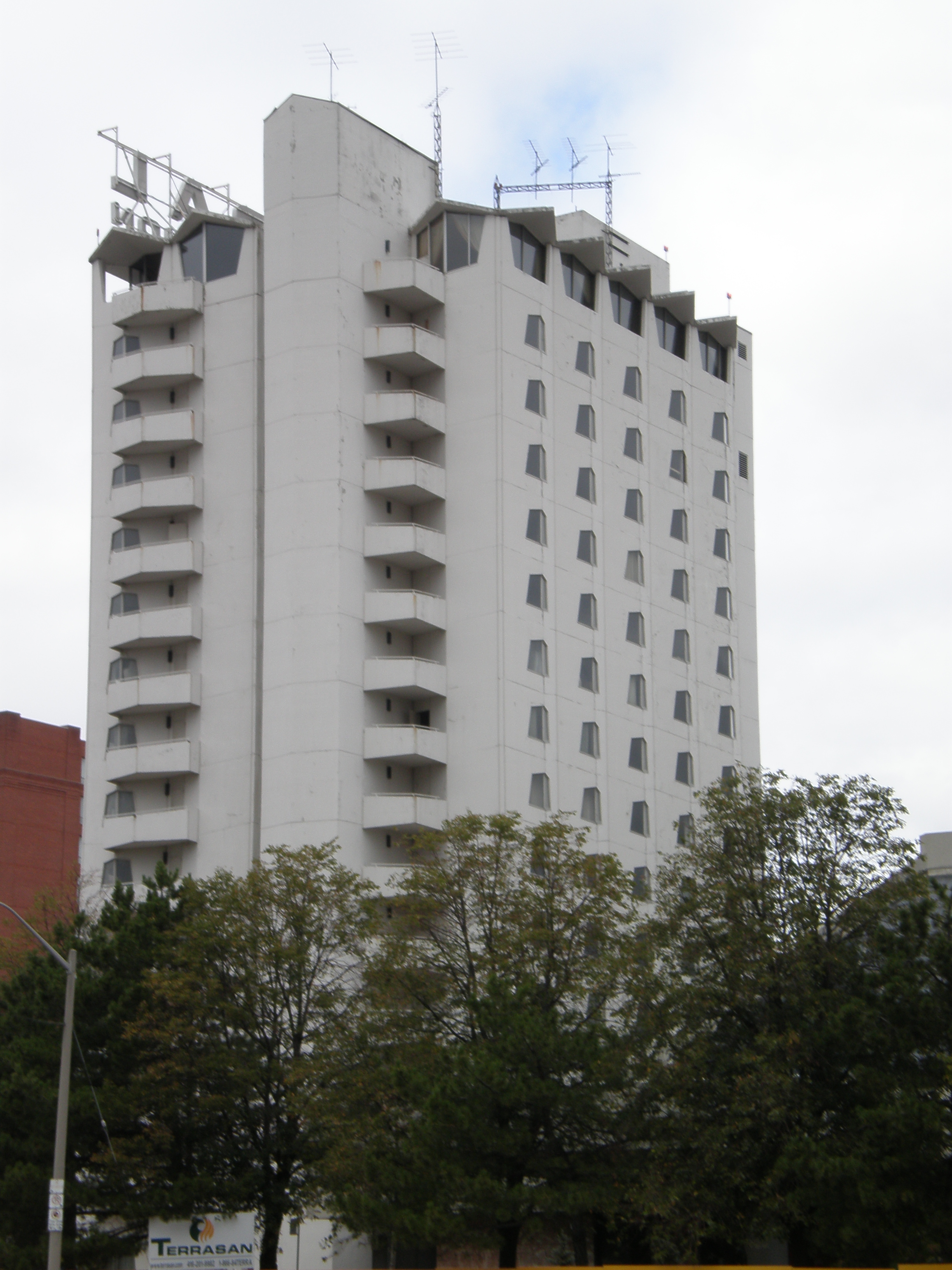

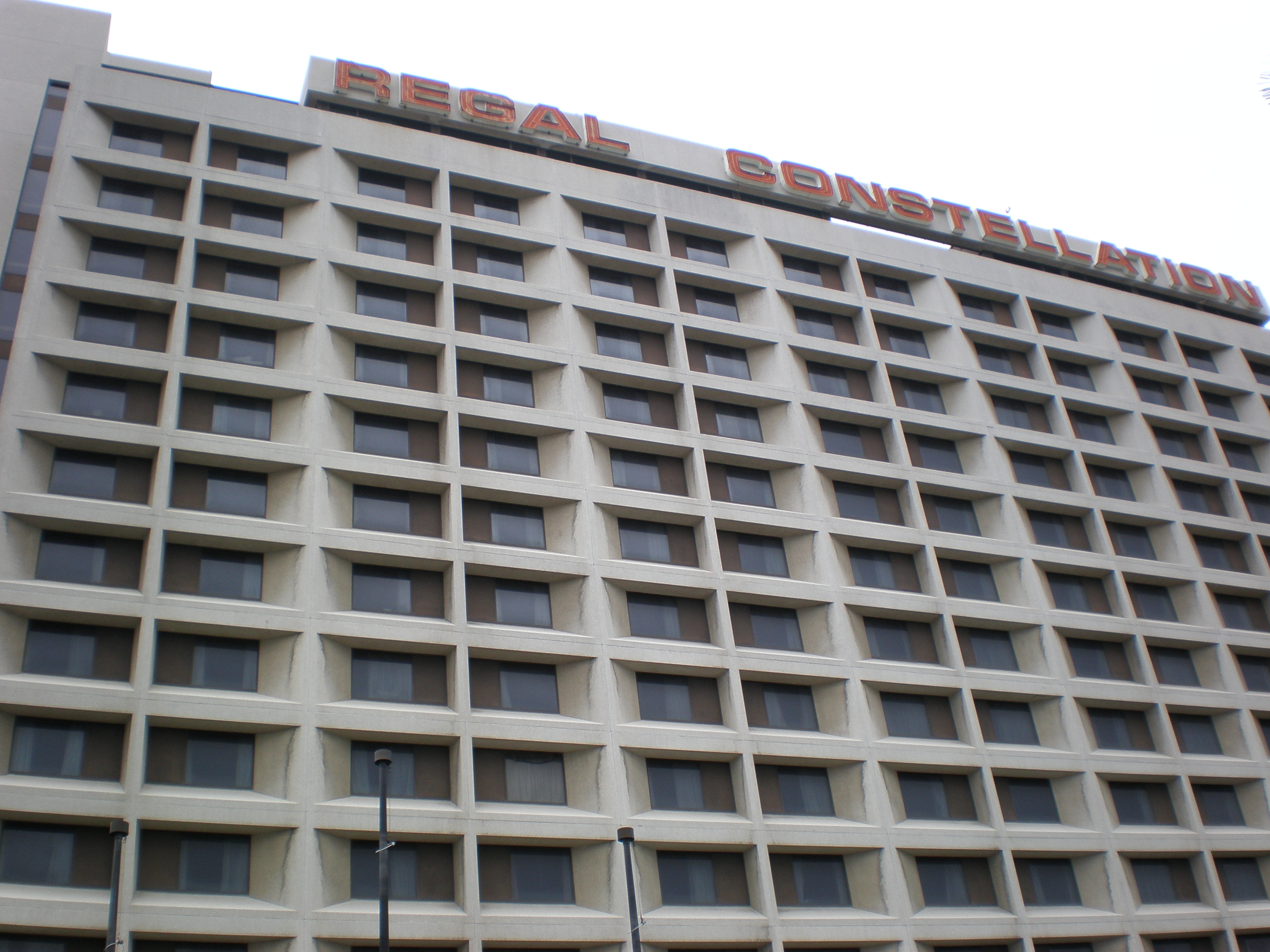

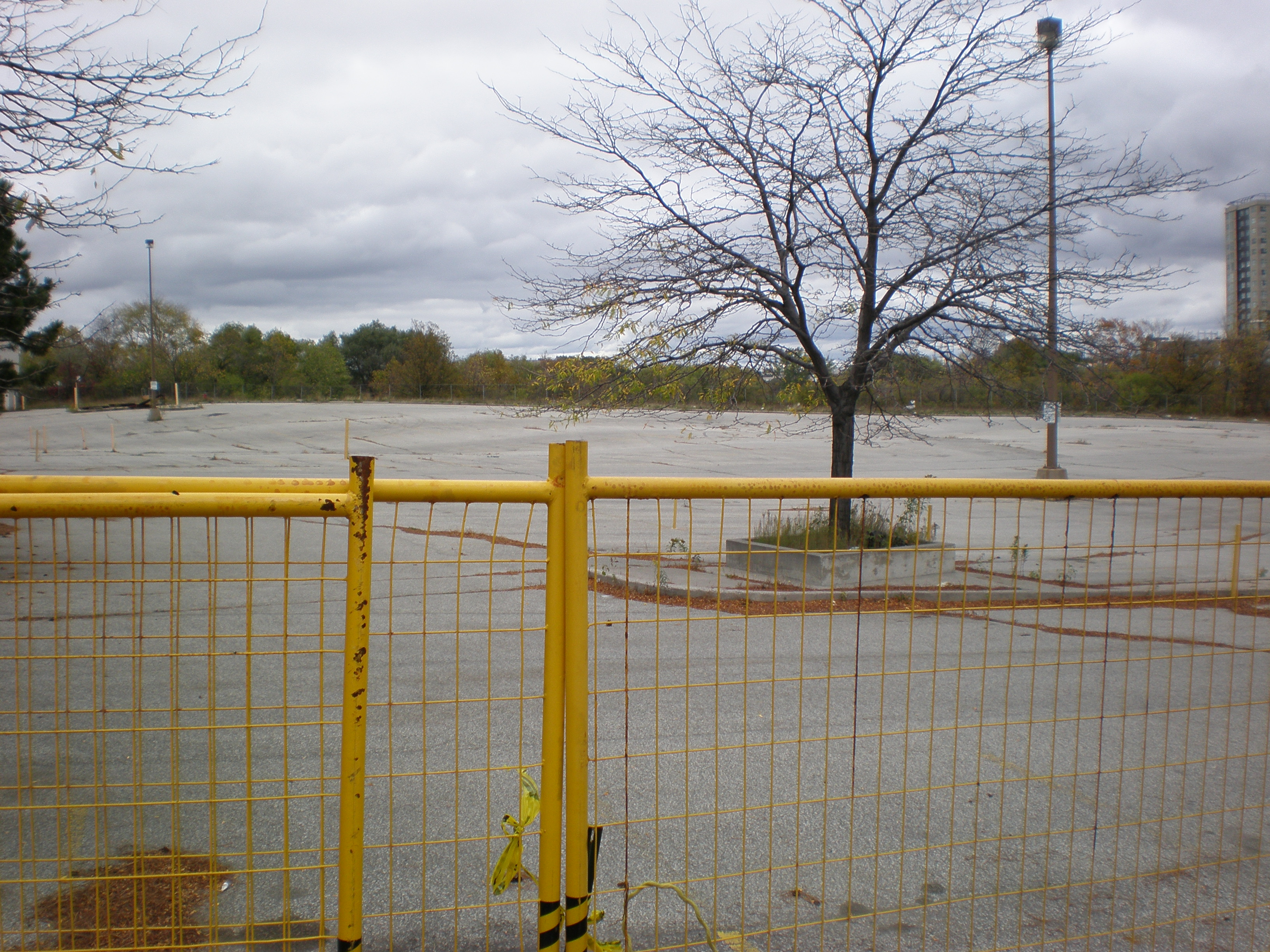
