= Spectrum (Amsterdam) =

Coordinates: 52°21′52.64″N 4°53′47.61″E

- Interactive map of Spectrum

Restaurant information
- Established: 2014
- Closed: 2026
- Head chef: Sidney Schutte
- Rating: Michelin Guide
- Location: Herengracht 542-556, Amsterdam, 1017 CG, Netherlands
- Website: Official website

Restaurant Spectrum (formerly Librije's Zusje) was a restaurant located in the Waldorf Astoria hotel in Amsterdam, Netherlands. It is a fine dining restaurant that is awarded two Michelin star since 2015.

Head chef of Spectrum is Sidney Schutte. Schutte, a former chef of "De Librije" and Librije's Zusje in Zwolle, returned to the Netherlands from Hong Kong, where he worked in The Landmark Mandarin Oriental.

On 1 May 2014, this second sister of De Librije opened for business. On 14 September 2014 it was announced that the first sister, Librije's Zusje in Zwolle, would close on 31 December 2014 and that De Librije would take over the location. Contrary to the first "Librije's Zusje", this restaurant is not owned by Jonnie Boer but a kind of franchise.

In October 2018 it was announced that "Librije's Zusje" would become independent and would change its name per 1 January 2019. After a refurbishment, the restaurant reopened as restaurant "Spectrum" on 6 February 2019.

The restaurant permanently closed in May 2026.

== See also ==
- List of Michelin-starred restaurants in the Netherlands
