= Biko (restaurant) =

Basque restaurant in Mexico City specialising in molecular gastronomy

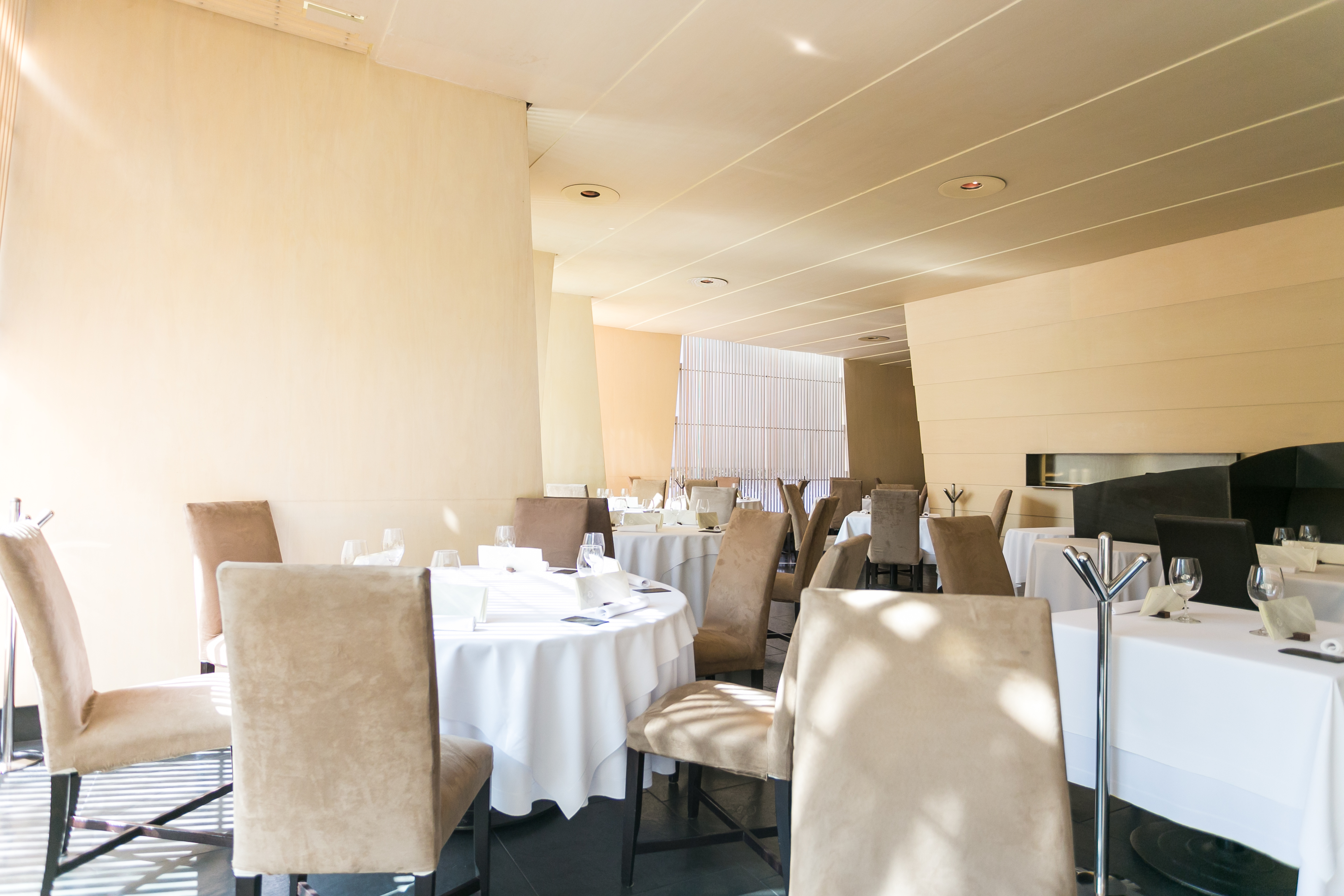
- Restaurant interior

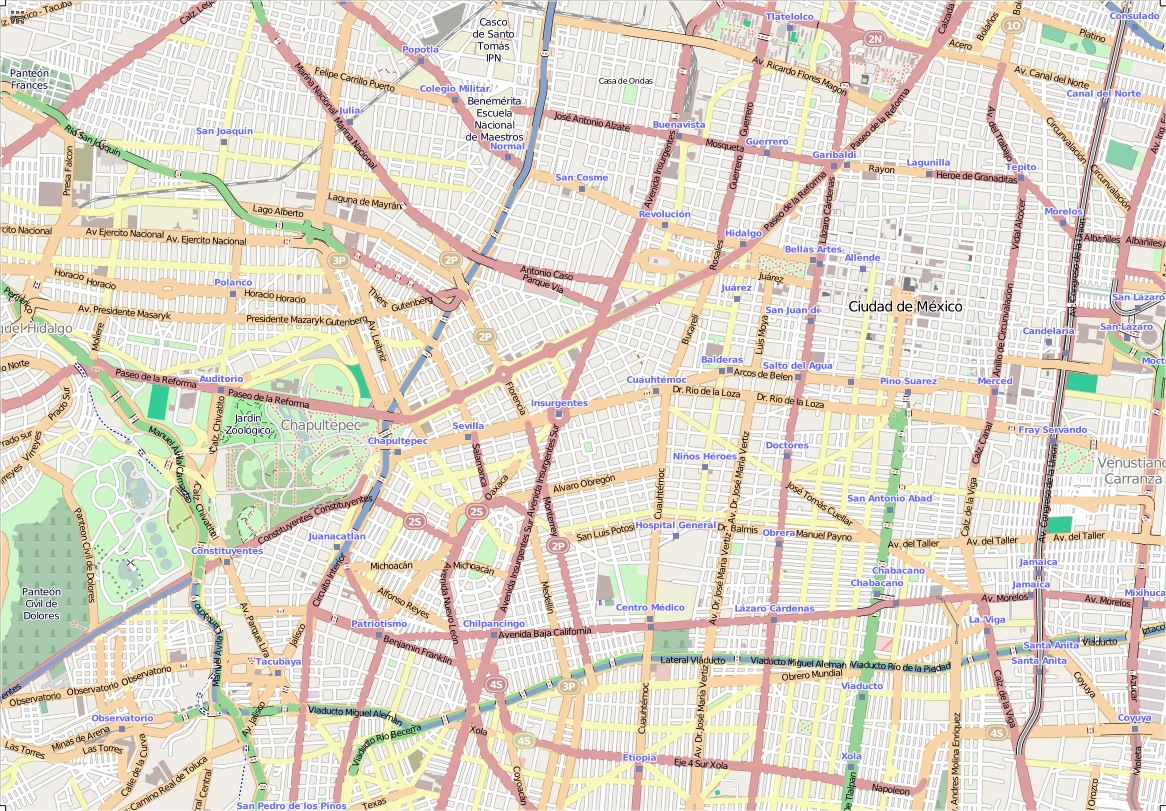
- Location of Biko

Restaurant information
- Established: 2008
- Closed: December 23, 2017; 8 years ago
- Owners: Bruno Oteiza and Mikel Alonso
- Head chef: Mikel Alonso
- Food type: Techno-emotional cuisine
- Location: Presidente Masaryk 407 Polanco, Mexico City, Mexico
- Coordinates: 19.431961°N 99.198743°W
- Website: Official website

Biko was a Basque restaurant in Mexico City specialising in experimental molecular gastronomy owned and operated by Basque chefs Bruno Oteiza and Mikel Alonso.

== Design and operations ==
Biko began operations in 2008. It is located in Polanco on Avenida Presidente Masaryk in Mexico City. The restaurant's layout, which incorporates both light and dark materials, was designed by Entasis Architects and inspired by "the duality and ingredients of Basque cuisine". The kitchen is run by co-owners Bruno Oteiza and Mikel Alonso, alongside Gerard Bellver. Biko specialises in techno-emotional cuisine. Dishes served at Biko include "burnt corn soup" and "foie gras topped with cotton candy", as well as "foamed cauliflower" and "almond-infused pork cheeks".

== Reception ==
In April 2012, Time Out reviewer Felipe Viterbo gave the restaurant a five-star review, praising its "legendary" and "outstanding" reputation and highlighting the "inventiveness of the kitchen, the ranges of taste, and the ingenious surprises." In June 2016, Ryan Sutton, writing for the food website Eater included Biko in his list of "The World's 50 Best Restaurants 2016", ranking in 43rd place. In November 2016, The Daily Telegraph reviewer Stephanie Rafanelli listed Biko as one of the top five restaurants in Mexico, describing its menu as "understated culinary genius".

== See also ==
- Basque cuisine
- Cocina de Autor, a restaurant headed by Oteiza and Alonso
- List of Basque restaurants
