= Richard Ekkebus =

Executive chef in Hong Kong

- Culinary career
- Current restaurant: Mandarin Oriental Landmark Hotel in Hong Kong

Richard Ekkebus is the Culinary Director of Mandarin Mandarin Oriental, The Landmark Hong Kong and its fine dining restaurant, Amber. The restaurant was awarded three Michelin Stars in 2025.

== Biography ==
Ekkebus began as an apprentice under Michelin-starred chefs Hans Snijders and Robert Kranenborg in the Netherlands. He won the prestigious Golden Chefs Hat for ‘Young Chef of the Year’ while he was in the Netherlands. He then further honed his skills under the tutelage of Pierre Gagnaire, Alain Passard and Guy Savoy.

He then became the executive chef at the Royal Palm Hotel in Mauritius. After seven years, he then took on the executive chef position at The Sandy Lane in Barbados.

Ekkebus has cooked for top international celebrities such as Michael Jordan, Tiger Woods, Beyoncé and Andrew Lloyd Webber.

His signature creations include transparent Gillardeau oysters and cucumber ravioli; Anjou pigeon, green pistachio foam, minced leg samosa, turnips caramelized mellow grey shallots, banyuls and chocolate emulsion; black truffle and foie gras sushi; and iced pandan leaf sabayon with ginger ice-cream and cashew brittle.

Dishes created by Richard Ekkebus will be served to KLM's World Business Class passengers from 1 December 2012 until the end of September 2013 on all intercontinental flights out of Amsterdam. A new development is that Richard Ekkebus’s dishes will also be served on flights out of Hong Kong.
