= Gillardeau oysters =

Brand of edible oysters that are produced by the Gillardeau family

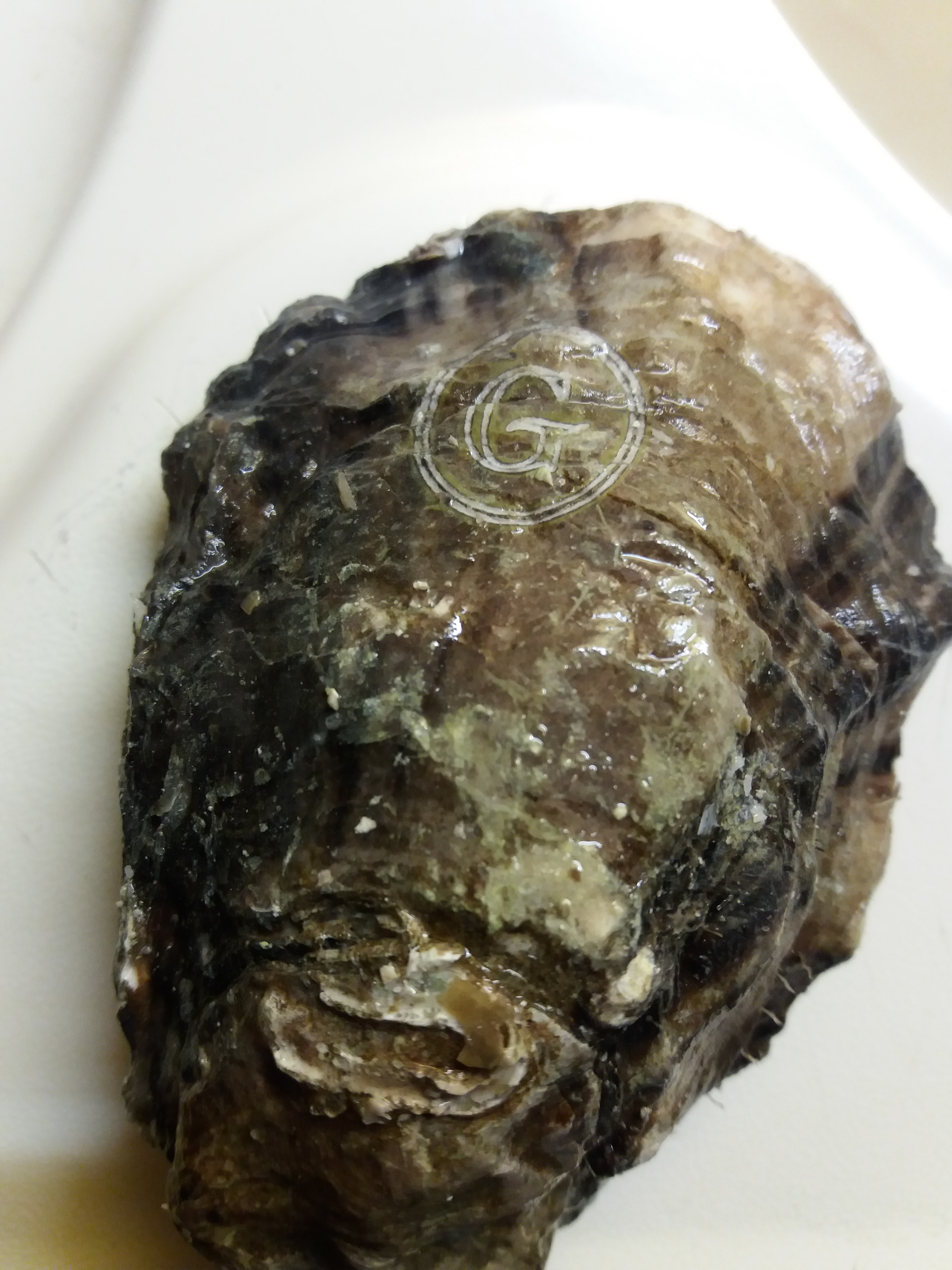
Gillardeau oysters

Gillardeau oysters are a brand of edible oysters that are produced by the Gillardeau family and their small private company, which was founded around 1898 in Bourcefranc-le-Chapus near La Rochelle and the Île d'Oléron in western France.

Gillardeau now produces roughly half its oysters in Normandy, near Utah Beach, and half in County Cork, Ireland. He also gets his oysters from P. Sugrue, one of the world's top growers from County Kerry, Ireland, where the waters are cleaner, there are fewer parasites and less agricultural runoff, and the area is easier to farm with tractors.
