= Regal Hotels International =

Hong Kong hotel operator

Regal Hotels Int'l Holdings Ltd.
- Company type: Public
- Traded as: SEHK: 78
- Industry: Property
- Founded: 1979; 47 years ago
- Headquarters: Hong Kong
- Key people: Lo Yuk Sui, chairman and managing director
- Products: Hotels, real estate
- Revenue: HK$1,141m (2005)
- Net income: HK$528m
- Number of employees: 1,650
- Website: www.regalhotel.com

Regal Hotels International (RHI) is one of the largest hotel groups in Hong Kong. Regal Hotels International Holdings Limited is a company incorporated in Bermuda and listed on the Hong Kong Stock Exchange.

== Ownership ==
The company is controlled by its chairman and managing director, Mr Lo Yuk Sui, who speaks for 52.84% of the issued share capital as at 31 December 2005. Lo is the second son of Great Eagle matriarch Lo To Lee-kwan (born 1918).

== REIT ==
In October 2006, the company announced plans to sell and separately list its hotel properties in a Real Estate Investment Trust. However, as the Sunlight REIT spun off by Henderson Land Development fell by 6.5% on its market debut on 21 December, Regal chose to delay its offer.

On 13 March 2007, Regal announced its public offer for sale of up to 50 percent in Regal Hotels Real Estate Investment Trust, to be co-sponsored by Deutsche Bank, Goldman Sachs and Merrill Lynch, and raised HK$2.3 billion.

== Hotels ==
Renovation of the Constellation during 26 October 2007. It was subsequently demolished in 2011–2012

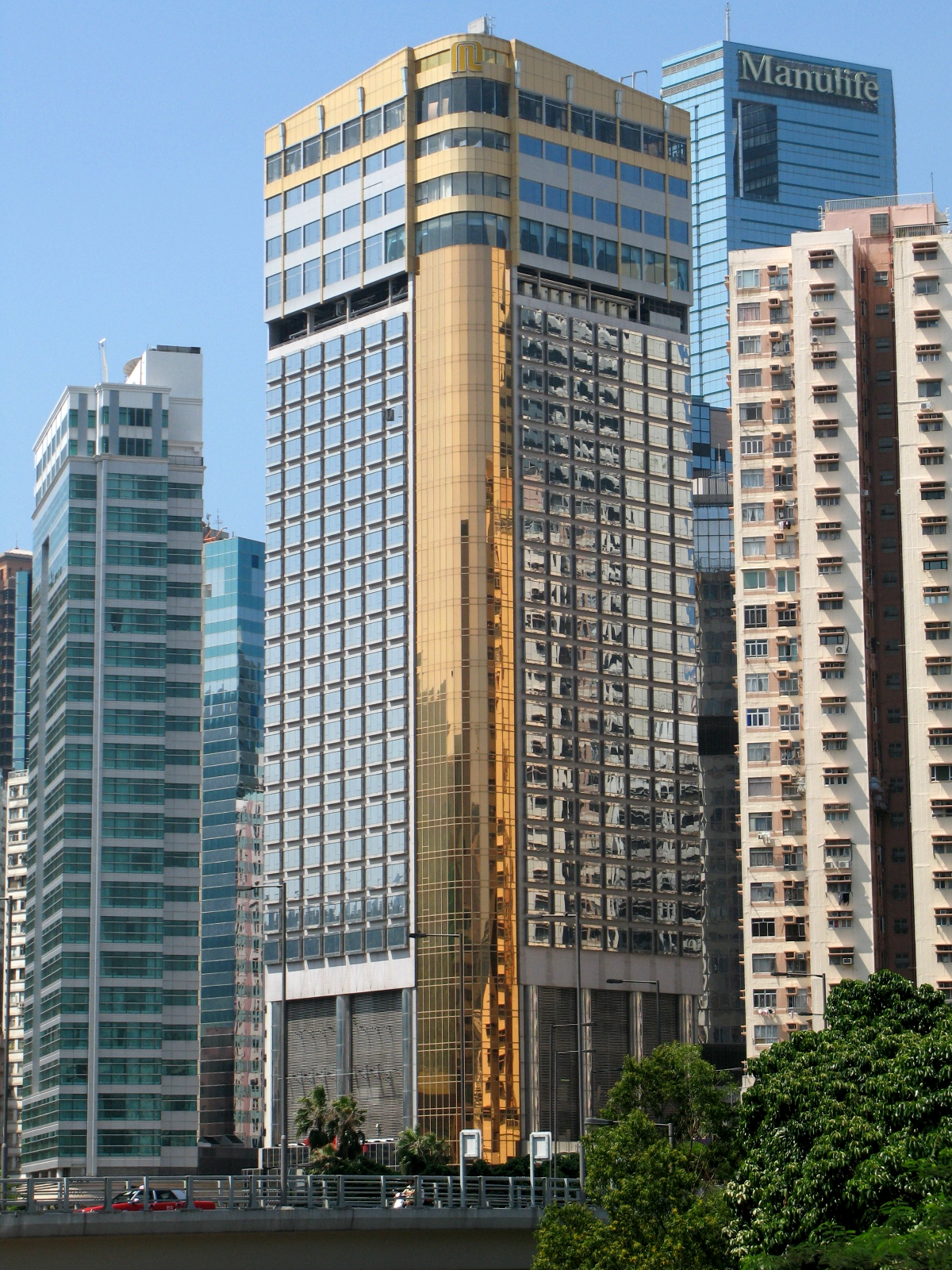
Regal Hongkong Hotel

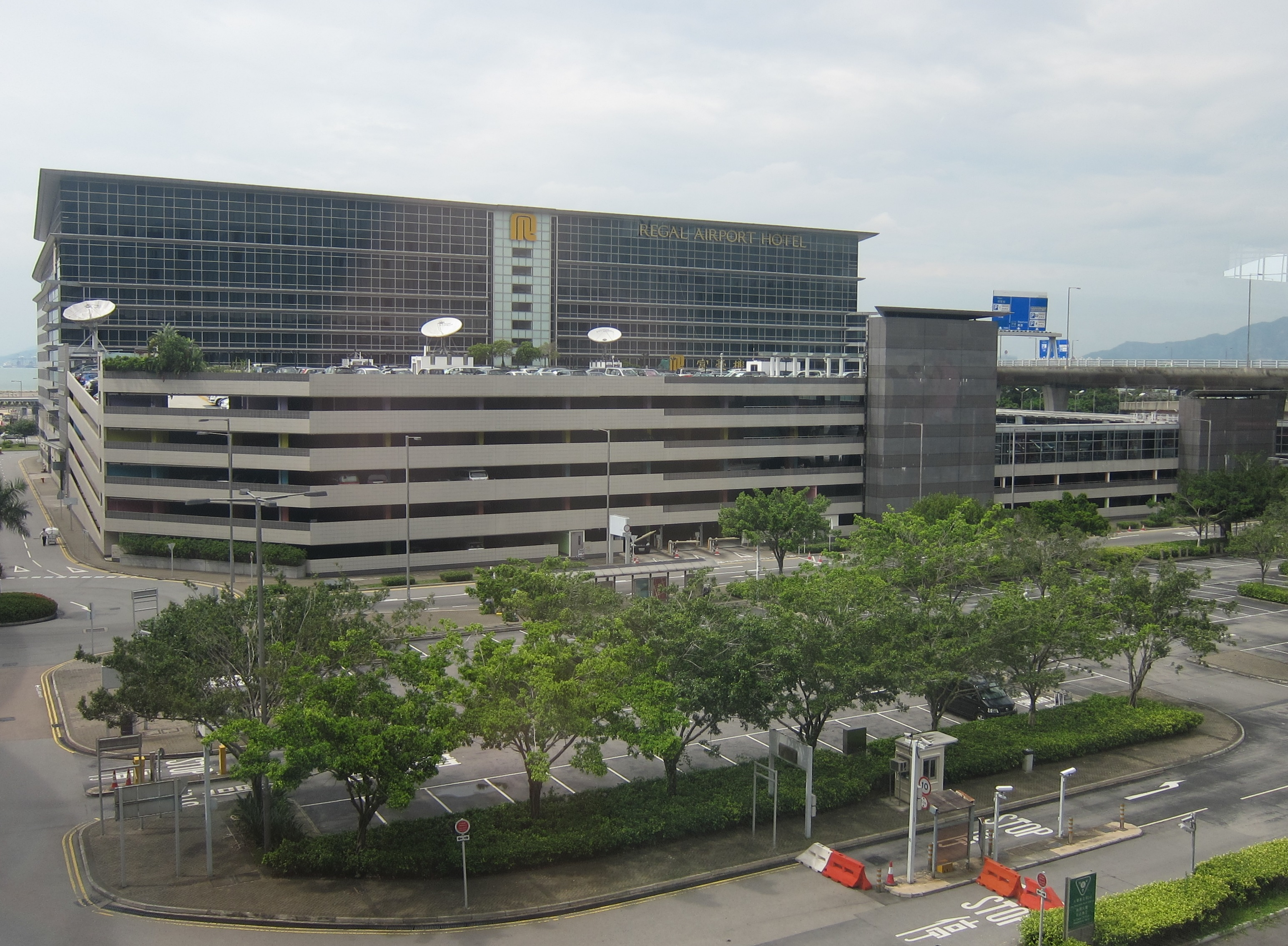
Regal Airport Hotel

=== Hong Kong ===
- Regal Airport Hotel, at the Hong Kong International Airport (Chinese: 富豪機場酒店)
- Regal Skycity Hotel, at the Hong Kong International Airport (麗豪航天城酒店)
- Regal Hongkong Hotel, in Causeway Bay (富豪香港酒店)
- Regal Kowloon Hotel, in Tsim Sha Tsui East (富豪九龍酒店)
- Regal Oriental Hotel, in Kowloon City (formerly called Regal Kai Tak, and Regal Meridien Hong Kong Airport Hotel) (富豪東方酒店)
- Regal Riverside Hotel, in Sha Tin (沙田麗豪酒店)
- iclub Wan Chai Hotel, in Wan Chai (富薈灣仔酒店)
- iclub Sheung Wan Hotel, in Sheung Wan (富薈上環酒店)
- iclub Fortress Hill Hotel, in Fortress Hill (富薈砲台山酒店)
- iclub To Kwa Wan Hotel, in To Kwa Wan (富薈土瓜灣酒店)
- iclub Mong kok Hotel, in Mong Kok (富薈旺角酒店)
- iclub AMTD Sheung Wan Hotel, in Sheung Wan (富薈尚乘上環酒店)

=== Shanghai ===
- Regal International East Asia Hotel (富豪環球東亞酒店)
- Regal Shanghai East Asia Hotel (上海富豪東亞酒店)
- Regal Jinfeng Hotel (富豪金豐酒店)
- Regal Plaza Hotel & Residence (富豪會展公寓酒店)

=== Dezhou ===
- Regal Kangbo Hotel (德州富豪康博酒店)
- Regal Kangbo Hotel and Residence

=== Former hotels ===
- Regal Constellation Hotel, a large property near Pearson International Airport in Toronto, Ontario built in 1962. The hotel consisted of two 15 floor towers, a six-storey atrium, a Chinese restaurant and 90,000 square feet (8,400 m^{2}) of convention space. Due to declining trade, the hotel was sold to Hospitality Investors Group of Scottsdale, Arizona in 2004 for redevelopment. Now owned by Park'N Fly, the hotel was demolished in 2011–2012 and is currently a vacant lot.
- Regal Bostonian Hotel, a property opposite Faneuil Hall in downtown Boston opened in 1981. Regal bought the hotel in 1996 and sold it to Millennium & Copthorne Hotels in 2002. Now operates as Millennium The Bostonian.
- Regal McCormick Ranch, a property in the master-planned community of McCormick Ranch in Scottsdale, Arizona.

== Controversies ==
On 14 February 2025, the Hong Kong Journalists Association announced that they had to postpone their annual fund raiser dinner due to a power supply issue at the Regal Hotel in Causeway Bay. The hotel refused to reschedule or re-accommodate the event and an undercover journalist subsequently discovered that there was no such issue. This led to speculation that the hotel may have been pressured into becoming complicit in the erosion of press freedom in Hong Kong.
