= Amber (restaurant) =

Coordinates: 22.28118°N 114.15844°E

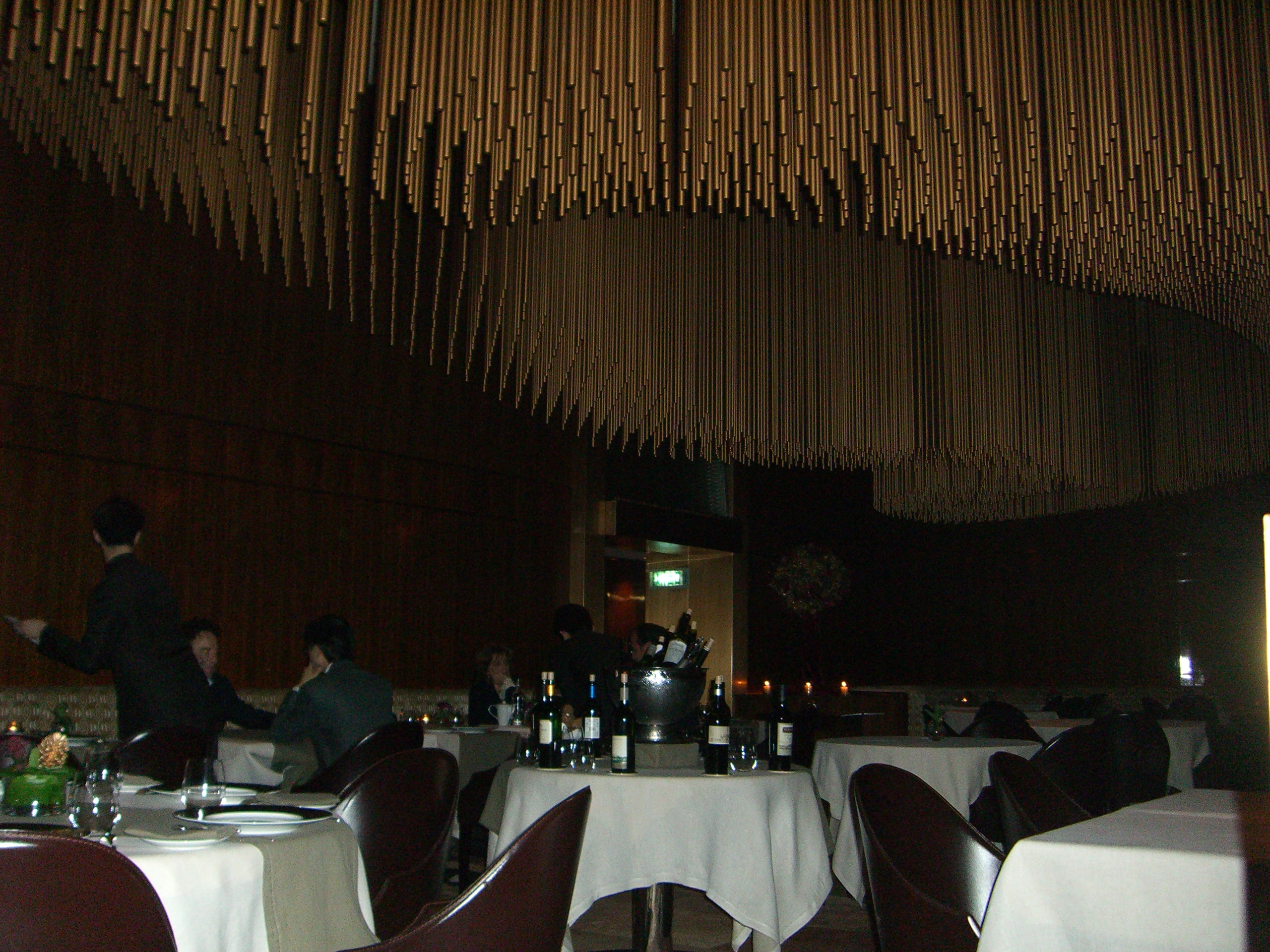
- Amber's interior
- Interactive map of Amber

Restaurant information
- Head chef: Richard Ekkebus
- Food type: French
- Dress code: Smart casual
- Rating: Michelin Guide 2025, Green Star (Michelin Guide)
- Location: 15 Queen's Road Central, The Landmark, Central, Central, Victoria City, Hong Kong
- Reservations: Yes
- Website: Amber

Amber is The Landmark Mandarin Oriental's modern French restaurant in the Central district of Hong Kong. Richard Ekkebus is the executive chef.

It has held three Michelin stars since 2025.

== 2019 refurbishment ==
Amber reopened on 2 May 2019 after a four-month hiatus. Chef Richard Ekkebus has done away with dairy and cut down on sugar and salt, using soy, rice, cereal and nut milk in place of dairy; fermentation and products like seaweed instead of salt; and agave, maple, honey and raw sugar in lieu of sugar. He created 50 new dishes.

== Signature dish ==
Hokkaido sea urchin with lobster Jell-O is the signature dish of Amber.

== Awards ==
The restaurant received two stars in the Michelin Guide's inaugural 2009 Hong Kong & Macau edition.

It was also placed 37th in S. Pellegrino's 2011 World's 50 Best Restaurants list in 2011. It stays 37th in The World’s Best Restaurants Awards in 2013. Amber is ranked 21st in Asia's Best Restaurants in 2019.

== Media attention ==
- Amber was featured in the TVB Payvision Lifestyle Channel's Be My Guest episode featuring Carol "Dodo" Cheng.

== See also ==
- List of Michelin 3-star restaurants in Hong Kong and Macau
- List of Michelin-starred restaurants in Hong Kong and Macau
