= Maria Lee =

American educator

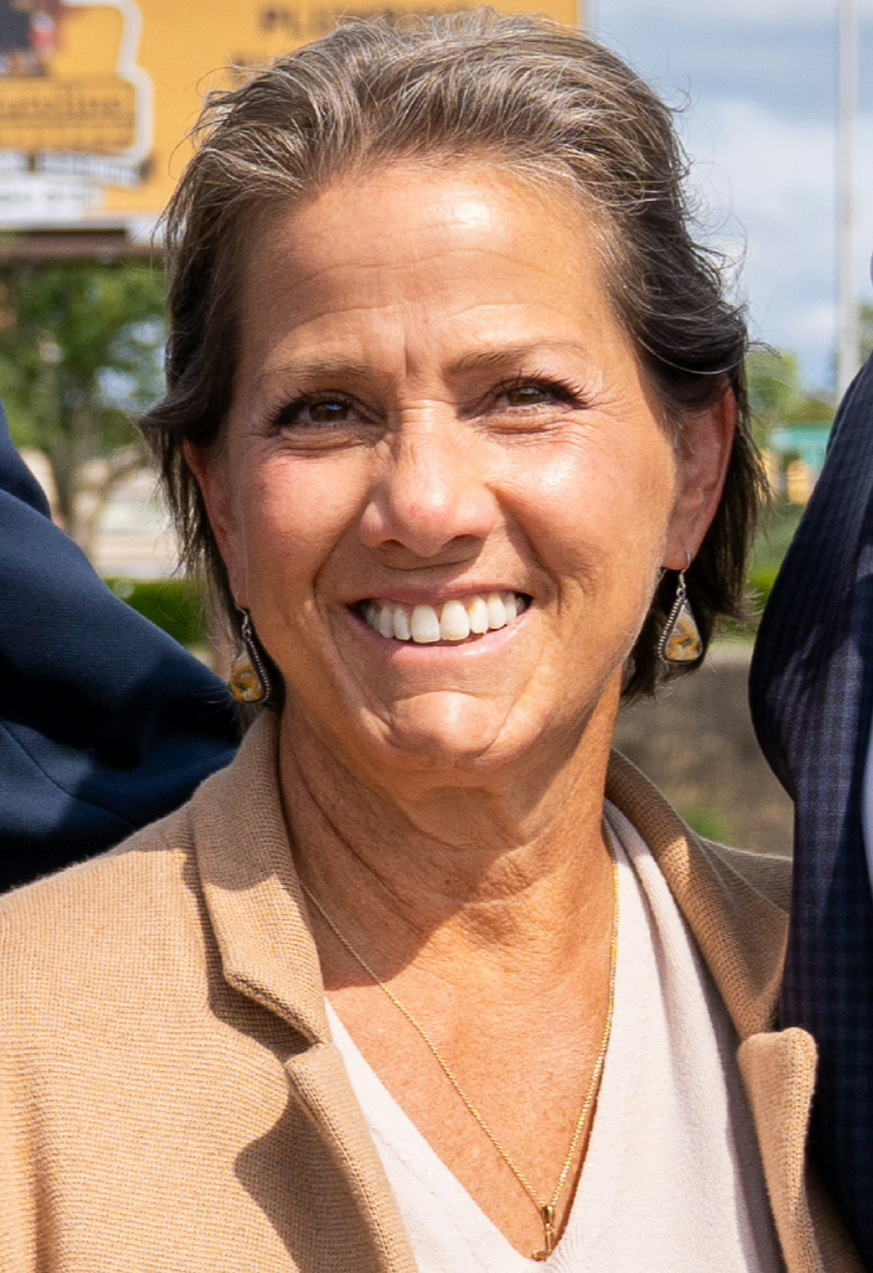
- Maria Lee in 2025

First Lady of Tennessee
- Current
- Assumed role January 19, 2019
- Governor: Bill Lee
- Preceded by: Crissy Haslam

Personal details
- Born: Silver Spring, Maryland, U.S.
- Party: Republican
- Spouse: Bill Lee (m. 2008)
- Education: University of Maryland
- Website: Government website

Maria Lee is an American educator and current First Lady of Tennessee. Her husband, Bill Lee, is the current Governor of Tennessee.

== Early life and education ==
Maria Lee was born and raised in Silver Spring, Maryland, a suburb of Washington, D.C. She grew up in a family of seven, with her mother being a stay-at-home-mom, and her father, a tile installer. After high school, she went to the University of Maryland, to become a teacher, and received her degree in Elementary Education.

== Career in education ==
Lee's teaching career led her to Tennessee, to a Christian school in Nashville, where she taught for 14 years. Along with being a third and fourth grade educator, Lee was also a coach for the school's softball, track and field, and cross-country teams.

== First Lady of Tennessee (2019-present) ==
Lee is Tennessee's current First Lady. Her initiative in the office has been focused on community service, volunteering, and faith-based activities in the state. She currently is on the board of the Friend2Friend Book Project, an organization that delivers literature to children and their families suffering from health issues.

In May 2019, Lee introduced her main initiative as First Lady, called Tennessee Serves. The program is designed to encourage Tennessee residents to engage in community service. The initiative also strongly focuses on youth serving. “At a young age, my parents taught me the importance of serving others, and now, it’s a big part of who I am. I hope to instill the same in kids at an early age,” Lee said. “By engaging kids, we hope that the whole family will get involved in serving.”

== Personal life ==
Lee married Bill Lee in October 2008. The couple live in Fernvale. They attend Grace Chapel Church and have been on multiple mission trips, including building houses in Mexico and working in an orphanage in Hati.

In August 2022, it was announced that Lee had been diagnosed with lymphoma. She began treatment immediately after the diagnosis. Later on, in February 2023, Lee completed her first part of cancer treatment and was scheduled for a bone marrow transplant.
