= Waldorf Astoria Amsterdam =

Luxury Hotel in Amsterdam, Netherlands

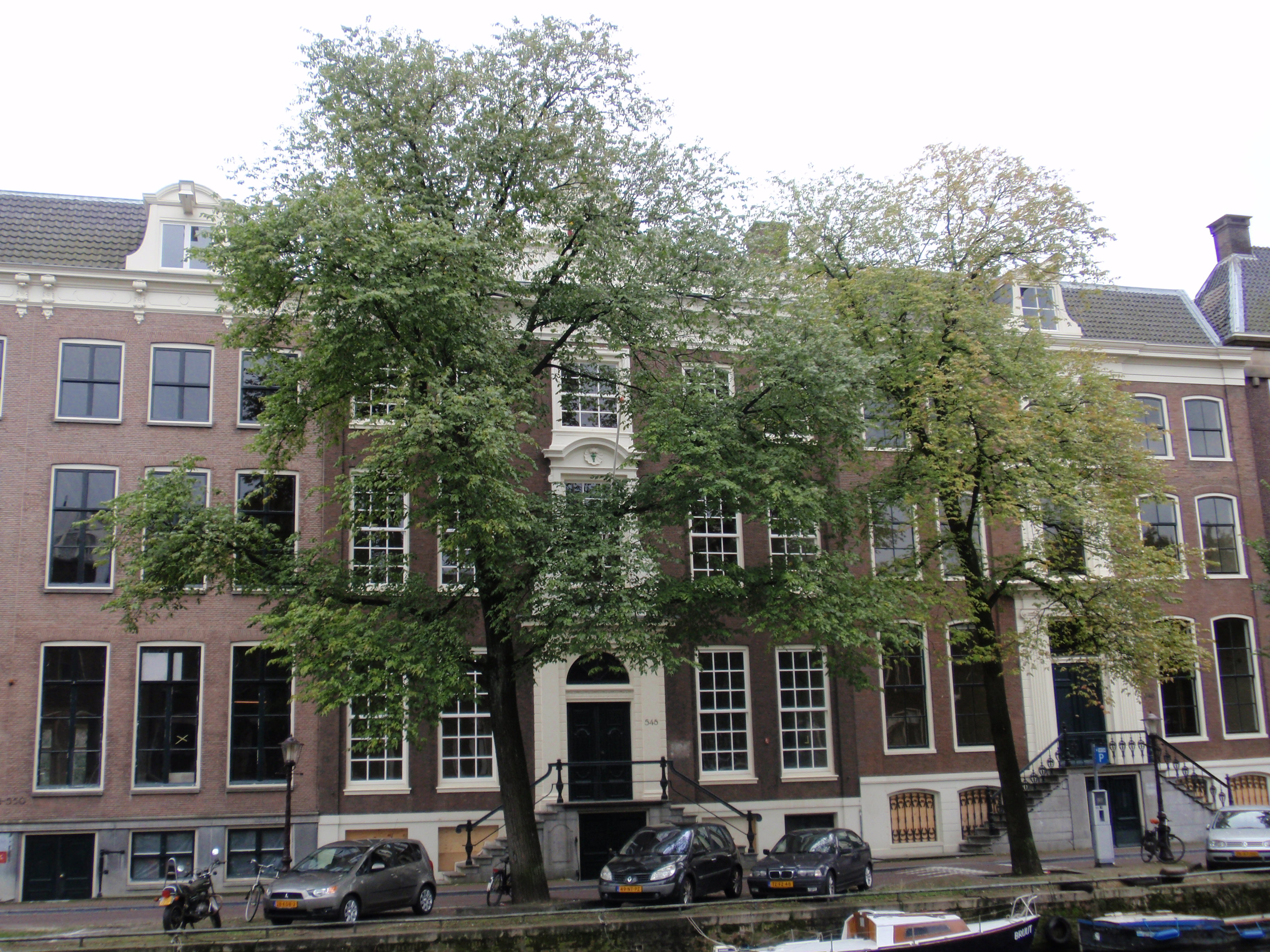

- Location within Amsterdam
- Hotel chain: Waldorf Astoria

General information
- Type: Luxury hotel
- Location: Herengracht 542-556, Amsterdam, Netherlands
- Coordinates: 52.364738°N 4.896956°E
- Opened: May 2014
- Owner: Hilton Worldwide

Other information
- Number of rooms: 93

Website
- Official website

Waldorf Astoria Amsterdam is a five-star luxury hotel in Amsterdam, part of Hilton Worldwide.

Waldorf Astoria Amsterdam was opened on May 1, 2014. It is the 25th hotel of the Waldorf Astoria Hotels & Resorts. It is located at Herengracht 542-556, between the Utrechtsestraat and Reguliersgracht, on the UNESCO heritage protected Herengracht (Gentlemen’s canal).

The hotel has a historical exterior comprising six monumental 17th and 18th century double-front canal palaces featuring a staircase built by the architect of Louis XIV, Daniel Marot. There are 93 rooms and suites overlooking the city's canal or the courtyard garden. The interior is designed by GA Design from London.

== History of buildings ==
Herengracht 542 and 544 buildings were built in 1687 under one roof.

In 1672 Herengracht 546 was built for Mr. William Sautijn.

Herengracht 548, 550 and 552 were built in 1665. Number 548 was for Cornelis Backer, former board ships and, number 550 for mayor Henry Hooft Gerritsz and No. 552 for Dirck van der Waeijen. In 1920, 548 and 550 were combined and converted into an office. Number 548 remained in the family until 1720, then it was sold to Nicholas Witsen and in 1747 to Gerrit Hooft Danielsz.

Herengracht 554 was built in 1666 as a double house. In 1716 the former mayor Quirijn van Strijen moved to live there, and in 1741 his son Jacob followed him. The building changed owners over the years as follows - Nicolaes Geelvinck lived there after 1756, until 1770 when the house was sold to Mr. Mayor William Huygens.

Herengracht 556 was built in 1670 and it was also a double house and Henry Hooft was the principal. In 1738 the two houses were replaced by the current building, where merchant James Loten moved. In 1930 it became a branch of the National Life Insurance. They allowed the restoration of the facade.

== Restaurants ==
The Waldorf Astoria Amsterdam offers several dining options. The first restaurant opened in the Waldorf Astoria Amsterdam is called Spectrum (Amsterdam). It is a fine dining restaurant that is awarded two Michelin stars. There is also a Peacock Alley restaurant and a bar.
