= De Librije =

Coordinates: 52°30′55.40″N 6°5′52.00″E

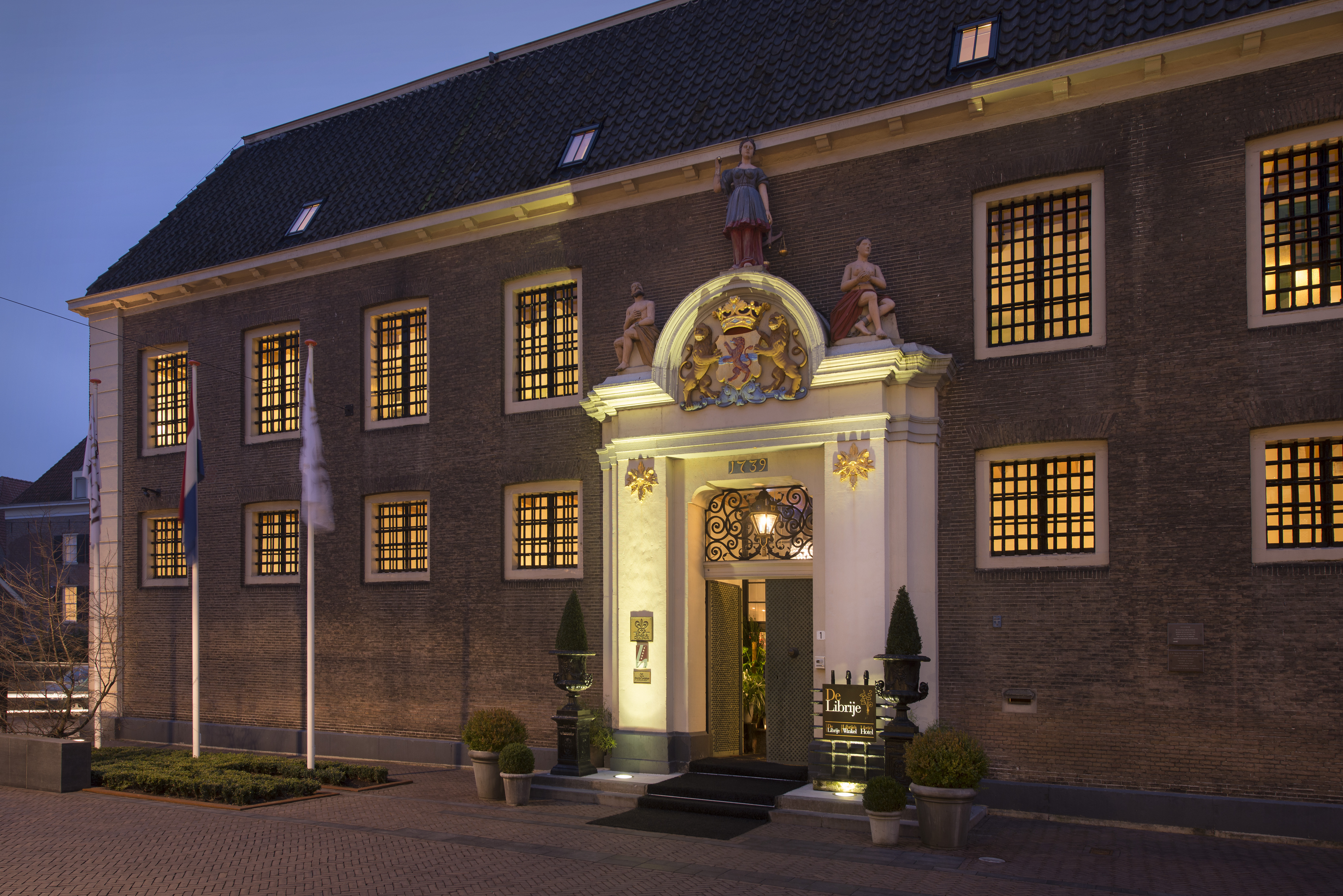
- location of De Librije
- Interactive map of De Librije

Restaurant information
- Owners: Thérèse Boer-Tausch & Family
- Head chef: Nelson Tanate
- Rating: Michelin Guide
- Location: Spinhuisplein 1, Zwolle, Netherlands
- Reservations: Required
- Website: www.librije.com

De Librije (Dutch pronunciation: [də liˈbrɛiə]) is a restaurant in Zwolle, Netherlands. It is a fine dining restaurant that has been awarded one or more Michelin stars since 1993. It carried one star in the period 1993–1998, two stars in the period 1999-2003 and three stars since 2004. In 2007 and 2008, the restaurant received a score of 19.5 and became Restaurant of the Year in the Dutch edition of Gault Millau.

The restaurant was formerly located in the old library of a 15th-century Dominican abbey, hence the name "De Librije". In 2015, the establishment moved to replace its secondary location on the other side of the Thorbeckegracht, which housed the "Librije's Zusje" (Librije's little sister) as part of the "Librije's Hotel". The chef de cuisine was Jonnie Boer and his wife Thérèse Boer-Tausch is maître and sommelier.In 1992, the couple—both of whom already worked at the restaurant—purchased the establishment.

== Awards ==
- Michelin star – one or more from 1993 to present
- The World's 50 Best Restaurant Awards – place 37 in 2010, 46 in 2011, 29 in 2014, 38 in 2016
- Gault Millau – Restaurant of the year 2011
- Verybest.com Awards – Very Best Restaurant 2010

== See also ==
- List of Michelin-starred restaurants in the Netherlands
- List of Michelin three-starred restaurants
