= Jonnie Boer =

Dutch chef (1965–2025)

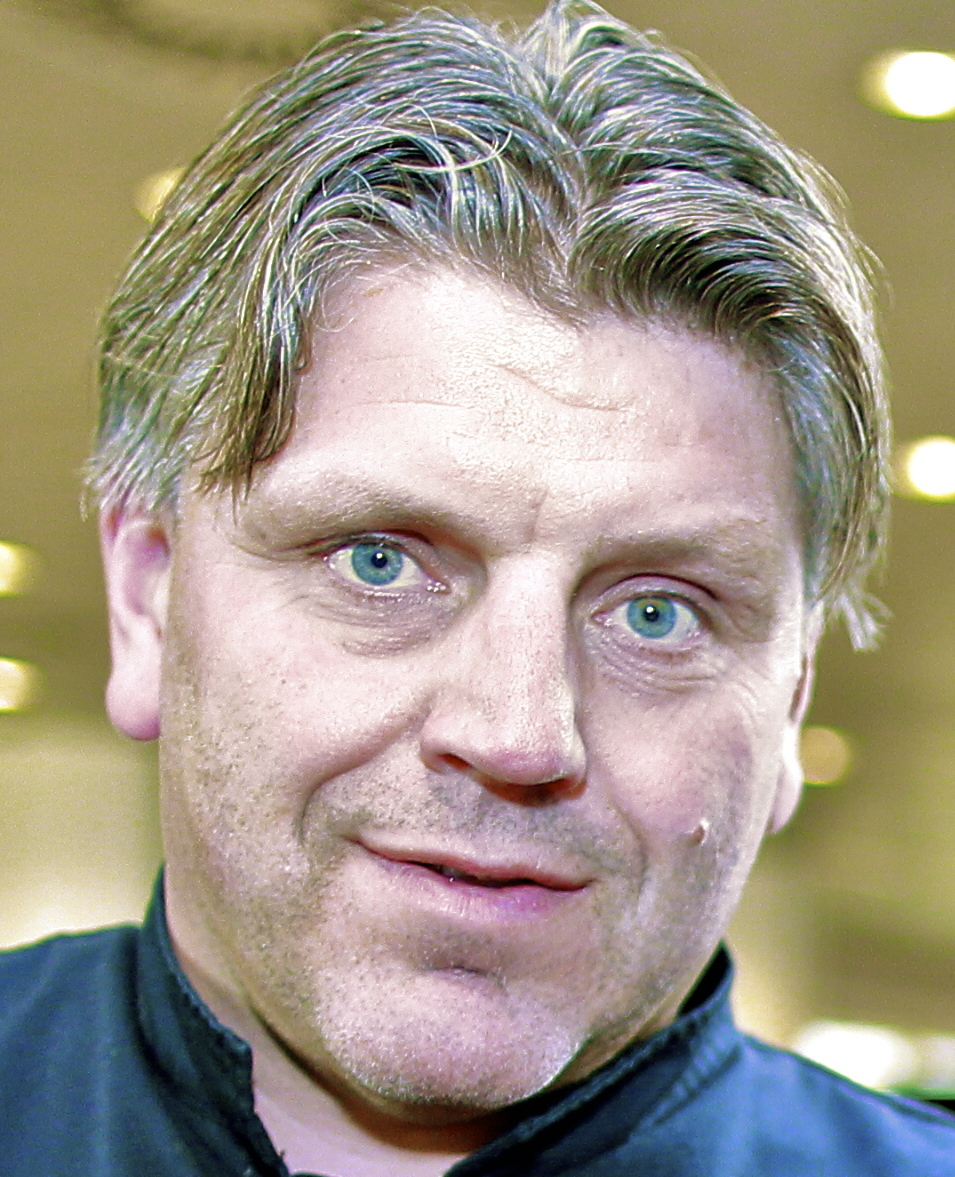
- Boer in 2011
- Born: 9 January 1965; Giethoorn, Netherlands
- Died: 23 April 2025 (aged 60); Bonaire, Netherlands
- Culinary career
- Rating: (Michelin Guide)
- Current restaurant: De Librije (family)

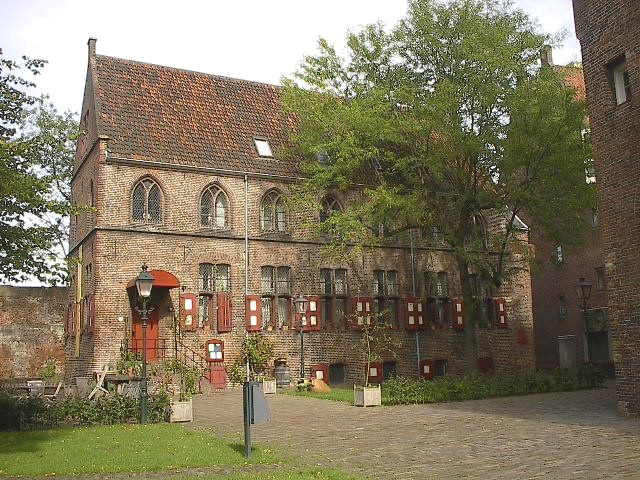
Restaurant De Librije in the old city center of Zwolle

Jonnie Boer (9 January 1965 – 23 April 2025) was a Dutch Michelin-starred head chef and co-owner of the restaurant De Librije in Zwolle, Netherlands.

== Biography ==
Boer was born in Giethoorn. Together with his wife and business partner Thérèse Boer he ran the 3-starred De Librije (in 16th century monastery library building) and Librije's Winkel (cooking shop). They also owned Librije's Hotel and Librije's Atelier (cook- and wine school), all located in a former women's prison.

In 1989, Boer became head chef at De Librije. In 1992, he and his wife bought the restaurant. The Michelin Guide awarded the first star in 1993. Five years later, Michelin awarded Jonnie Boer his second star. In 2004 Boer was awarded his third star.

Jonnie Boer used nature as his source of inspiration to develop new dishes, but also as basis of his cooking.

Boer died of a pulmonary embolism on Bonaire, on 23 April 2025, at the age of 60.

== Controversy ==
In February 2011, the local paper De Stentor reported that Jonnie Boer was in financial trouble. Fact was that the Librije Group was hit by the economic recession and had to cut costs. The firebrand sale at order from the banks of restaurant Koperen Kees was nonsense, according to Jonnie Boer. Boer claimed that the sale of Koperen Kees was one of priorities, the theater-formula not fitting the philosophy of the rest of the Librije Group. Sander Dol became the new owner.

== Books ==
Books by himself or with his wife

- Puur : Restaurant De Librije, Zwolle (Dutch); 1997
- Puurder : Restaurant De Librije, Zwolle (in Dutch and English); 2001
- De Librije : puur eten & drinken (Dutch); 2005
- Purer: The Cooking, Wine & Spirits Bible--Restaurant De Librije Zwolle (English); 2006
- Pure Passie : makkelijke recepten uit de keuken van De Librije, wijntips en leuke anekdotes (Dutch); 2009

Books written with others

- Puur natuurlijk : Restaurant De Librije, Zwolle (Dutch); 2003
- En Cas : Jonnie Boer, Alwin Houwing, Nico Boreas, Robert van Beckhoven, Edwin Kats, Ronald Tausch en Cas Spijkers (Dutch); 2005
- Duvel à la carte (Dutch); 2005
- Lang leve vis : visrecepten van vierentwintig topkoks (Dutch); 2007
- Met Gort de Boer op : de wonderbaarlijke avonturen van twee fijnproevers op een zoektocht naar 100 jaar Cuisine Hollandaise (Dutch); 2007
- Met Gort de Boer op : de wonderbaarlijke avonturen van twee fijnproevers op een zoektocht naar 100 jaar Cuisine Hollandaise (Dutch, ebook); 2008
- Eten, drinken, slapen (Dutch); 2010
- Grote kookkunsten : "een kookboek voor en door kinderen" : met 65 lievelingsrecepten van kinderen van de Geert Groteschool in Zwolle (Dutch); 2010

== See also ==
- De Librije
