= List of restaurants in Hong Kong =

This is a list of notable restaurants in Hong Kong.

== Restaurants ==
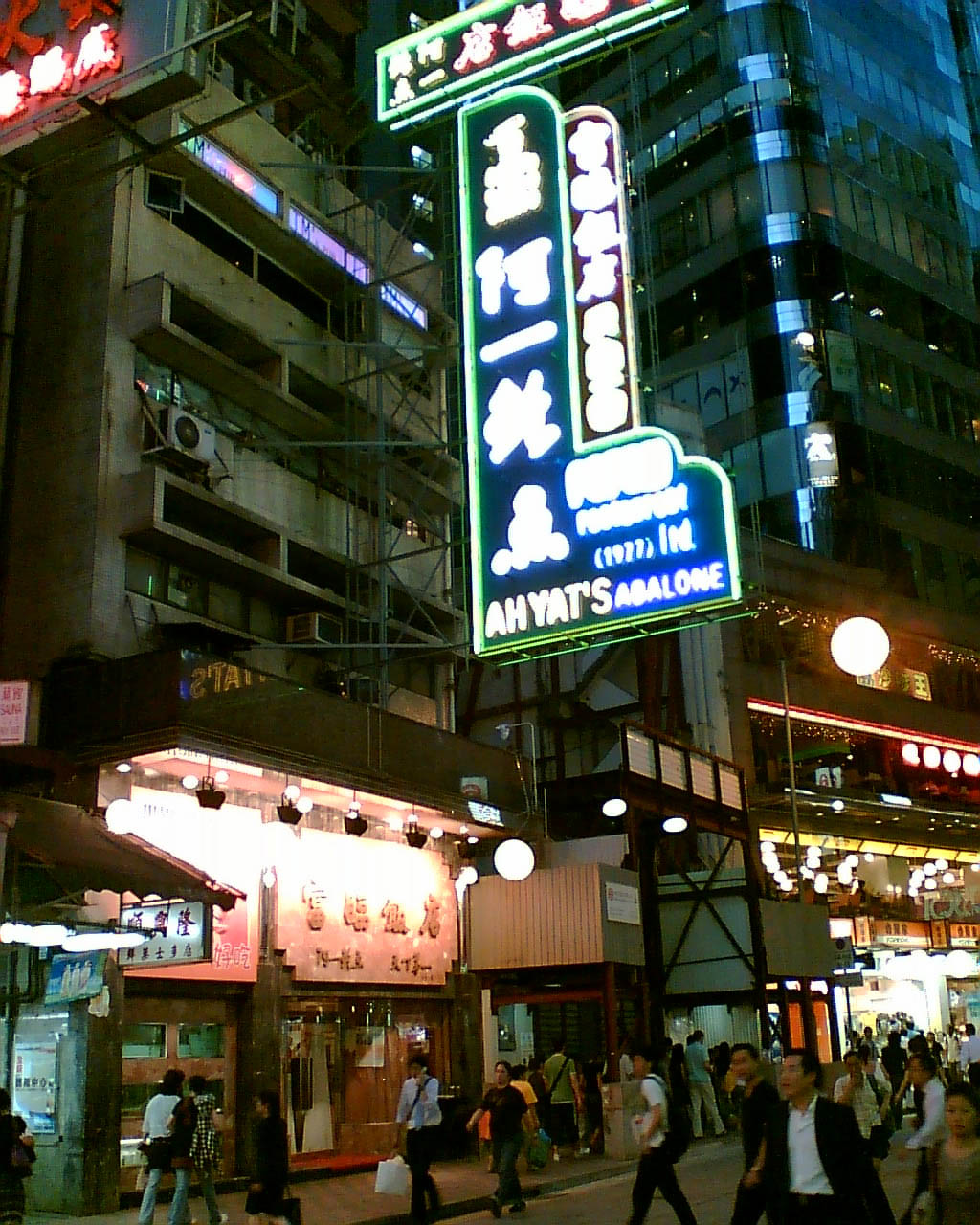
The exterior of Forum Restaurant in 2006

- 8½ Otto e Mezzo
- Amber
- Amigo
- L'Atelier de Joël Robuchon – Restaurant in Hong Kong
- Australia Dairy Company – Restaurant in Jordan, Hong Kong
- Cafe 2 Oyster n Grill, Sai Ying Pun
- Caprice – Restaurant in Hong Kong
- Cha chaan teng – Type of Cantonese restaurant
- EL Cerdo (Central & Tsuen Wan)
- Fairwood – Hong Kong fast food chain
- Fook Lam Moon
- Forum Restaurant
- Gaddi's – Building in People's Republic of China
- Genki Sushi – Japanese restaurant chain
- Hawker centre – Open-air food court in Asia
- Heichinrou Hong Kong
- Hui Lau Shan – Desert shop chain from Hong Kong
- Ippudo – Japanese ramen restaurant chain

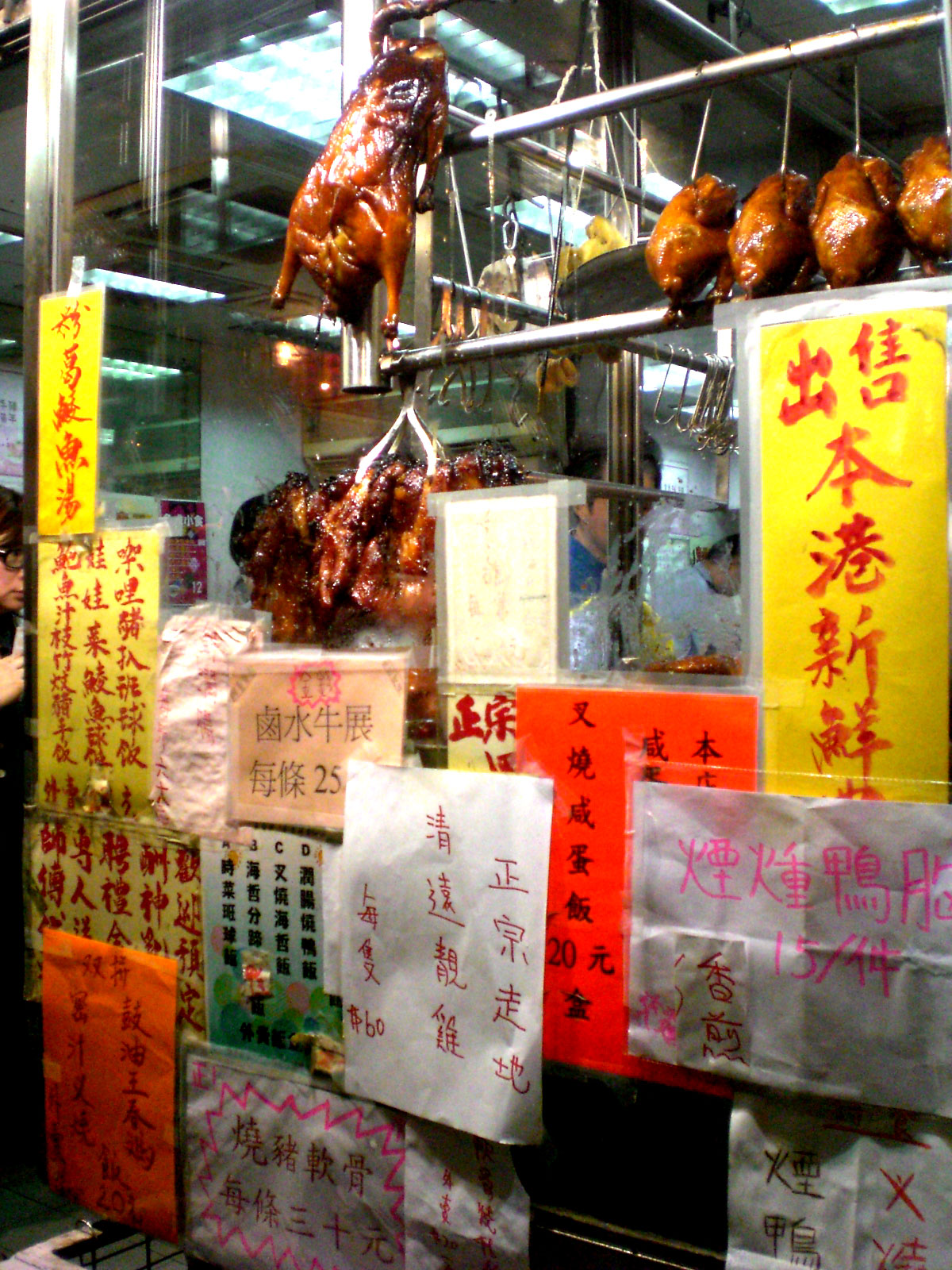
Joy Hing's Roasted Meat in Wanchai, Hong Kong, 2009

- Joy Hing's Roasted Meat
- Jumbo Kingdom – Two restaurants in Aberdeen, Hong Kong
- Kau Kee Restaurant – Noodle restaurant in Hong Kong
- Lawry's – Restaurant chain
- Luk Yu – Chinese writer who influenced tea drinking
- Lung King Heen
- Mak's Noodle – Cantonese restaurant in Central, Hong Kong
- Mott 32 – International restaurant chain
- The Peak Lookout
- Pierre
- Shia Wong Hip – Restaurant in Hong Kong
- Star Seafood Floating Restaurant – Building in Sha Tin, Hong Kong
- Tai Ping Koon – Restaurant in Hong Kong
- Tim Ho Wan – Hong Kong restaurant chain
- Tsui Wah Restaurant – Hong Kong restaurant chain
- Wing Wah – Hong Kong restaurant chain
- Wolfgang's Steakhouse – American steakhouse chain
- Yucca de Lac – Restaurant in Hong Kong
- Yung Kee
- Zuma – International Japanese-style restaurant chain

=== Fast-food chains ===
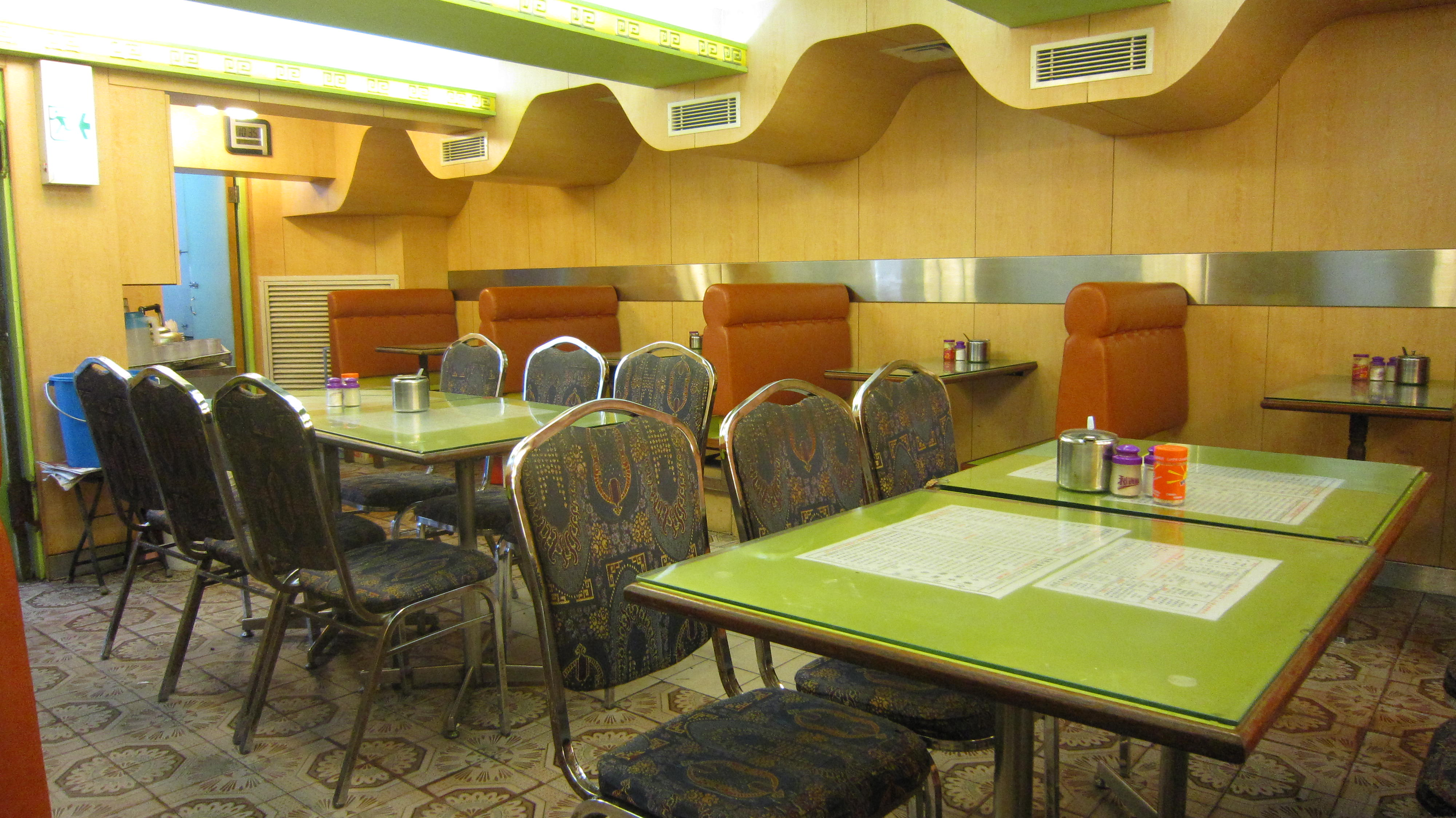
The interior of a Cha chaan teng restaurant in Mongkok, Hong Kong

- Café de Coral – Hong Kong Fast food
- Cha chaan teng – Type of Cantonese restaurant
- Fairwood – Hong Kong fast food chain
- Maxim's Catering – Hong Kong food company
- Pacific Coffee Company – Hong Kong based coffee chain
- Yoshinoya – Japanese fast food restaurant chain

== See also ==
- Cuisine of Hong Kong
- List of companies in Hong Kong
- List of Michelin 3-star restaurants in Hong Kong and Macau
- List of Michelin starred restaurants in Hong Kong and Macau
- List of restaurants
