= Cantonese restaurant =

Type of Chinese restaurant

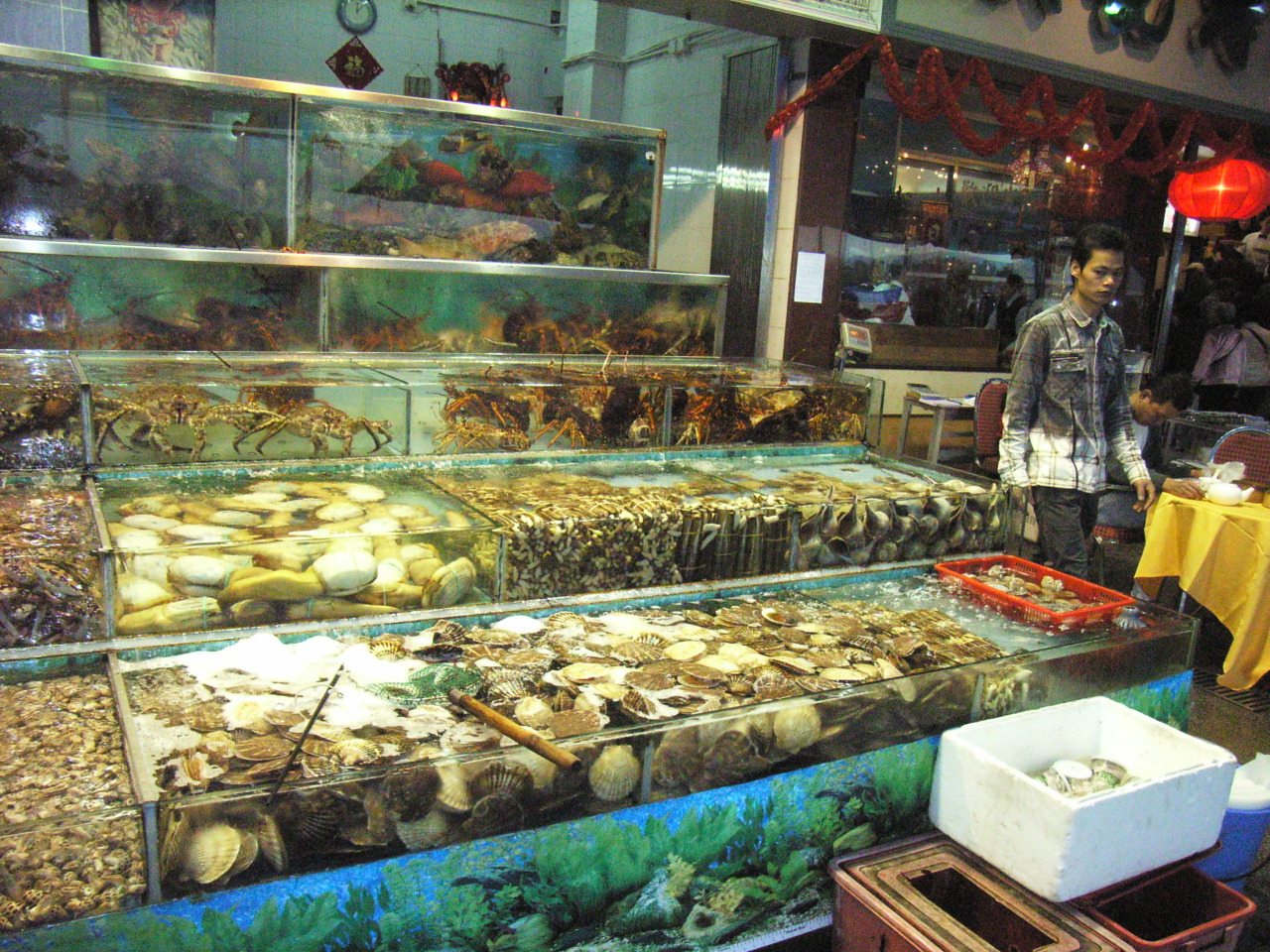
- A seafood restaurant in Sai Kung, Hong Kong
- Traditional Chinese: 粵式酒家
- Simplified Chinese: 粤式酒家
- Literal meaning: Cantonese restaurants
Transcriptions
Standard Mandarin
- Hanyu Pinyin: yuè shì jiǔ jiā
Yue: Cantonese
- Jyutping: jyut6 sik1 zau2 gu1

Alternative Chinese name
- Traditional Chinese: 酒樓
- Simplified Chinese: 酒楼
- Literal meaning: wine house
Transcriptions
Standard Mandarin
- Hanyu Pinyin: jiǔ lóu
Yue: Cantonese
- Jyutping: zau2 lau4

A Cantonese restaurant is a type of Chinese restaurant that originated in Southern China. This style of restaurant has rapidly become common in Hong Kong.

== History ==
Some of the earliest restaurants in colonial Hong Kong were influenced by Cantonese people. Throughout the history of Hong Kong cuisine, a great deal of Southern China's diet became synonymous with Cantonese-style food.

Following the emigration of Cantonese people from Hong Kong to Southeast Asia and the Western world, these authentic Cantonese restaurants began appearing in many Chinatowns overseas. From 1980 to 1986, an estimated 21,000 people permanently left Hong Kong each year, and from 1987 the numbers rose sharply to 48,000 people a year and continued to increase dramatically following the Tiananmen Square protests of 1989.

Many Chinese restaurants in the United Kingdom are actually Cantonese take-out restaurants, with few people recognizing the difference between Cantonese and mainstream Chinese.

The origin of Cantonese restaurants was the tea-house. Tea-houses were places where people met to drink tea during China's imperial history. They were popular in southern China where people used to love drinking tea. Therefore, tea-houses were always characterised as a social function to gather people.

Many early Chinese restaurants were influenced by the Cantonese people. Southern China is famous for nice weather benefiting agriculture. Therefore, many regional Chinese cuisines in fact originated in Southern China, although one managed to gain immense popularity as Cantonese cuisine.

== Restaurant types ==
Typically in the afternoon, dim sum are served during yum cha hour. A few Cantonese dishes may be available. In the evening, various Chinese banquets of Cantonese cuisine are held in the restaurant.

- Tea house: chaa lau (Chinese: 茶樓), is a place serving only tea, dim sum and simple dishes.
- Wine house: jau lau (Chinese: 酒樓), is a place serving banquets. i.e. 9-course menu usually for a table of 12 guests. From the early 20th century, jau lau started providing tea and dim sum like chaa lau. Thus only a few chaa lau remain in business.
- Seafood restaurants (Chinese: 海鮮酒家), are restaurants that specialise in live seafood dishes.

Modern Cantonese dishes are distinct from their early roots in Guangzhou. They include regular use of off-the-shelf condiments, along with natural and artificial additives. Most modern Chinese restaurants do not cook with 100% raw herbs and spices.

== Business ==
Nearly all Cantonese restaurants provide yum cha, dim sum, dishes, and banquets with their business varying between the hour of the day. Some restaurants try to stand out by becoming more specialised (focusing on hot pot dishes or seafood, for example), while others offer dishes from other Chinese cuisines such as Sichuan, Shanghai, Fujian (Teochew cooking, a regional variation of Guangzhou is similar to that of Fujian), Hakka, and many others.

A new kind of Cantonese restaurant is quickly spreading overseas and mainland China, often referred to as Hong Kong-style jau lau (Chinese: 香港式酒樓) outside Hong Kong.

== Michelin-starred restaurants ==
In the inaugural 2009 Hong Kong and Macau edition of the Michelin Guide, 14 restaurants received stars including ten with one star, three with two stars and the maximum of three stars to Lung King Heen at the Four Seasons Hotel Hong Kong helmed by Chef de cuisine Chan Yan-tak. It remains as the only Chinese restaurant in Hong Kong to carry such distinction.

Other Michelin-starred Cantonese restaurants includes:

- Fook Lam Moon - one star in 2009 edition, received their second one for their Wanchai branch and one star for their Kowloon branch in the 2010 edition.
- Forum Restaurant - one star in 2009 edition
- Ming Court in Langham Place Hotel - one star in 2009 edition
- T’ang Court in The Langham Hotels International - two stars in 2009 edition
- Shang Palace at Kowloon Shangri-La - two stars in 2009 edition
- Summer Palace at Island Shangri-La - two star in 2009 edition
- Yung Kee - one star received in the 2009 edition but on 1 December 2011, it was relegated to "Bib Gourmand" section of the guide's 2012 edition.

In the 2013 edition, independent restaurant Pang's Kitchen in Happy Valley was awarded one star.

== Historical customs ==
Yum cha has a rich history and customs have been developed.

For the traditional Chinese Restaurant, all tables must be round. Food is served in the middle of the table and dishes are shared among the people at table. This is why yum cha is regarded as a social function. The design of the table helps to foster communication between people.

A usual practice is whenever you see others’ teacup is emptied, you would help them, especially the elders, to refill the tea. It is a Chinese custom to tap fingers on the table near your cup twice as a sign of reverence and thanks. Parents usually teach their children to practice filial piety to elders by refilling tea and serving food to them.

== Chinese restaurants abroad ==
From the 1980s, there were several migrating waves in China. Among the migrants, many chefs brought along their skills and developed a Chinese food industry overseas. Some enterprises brought capital with them to open up Chinese restaurants abroad. Migrants brought Chinese cuisine and its eating culture overseas. And it became the main type of business of Chinese immigrants. However they are not gaining acceptance by most of the non-Chinese locals until the 20th century. Therefore, the younger generation has tend to change the image of Chinese cuisine from a cheap to trendy image. Alan Yau, the CEO of Soft chow, who changed the Chinese cuisine industry in a professional way, for him the past is a template to refashion and resist. He is both troubled and inspired by his own history in Spain, it is reported that there were eight hundred Chinese restaurants in Madrid and one hundred in Barcelona. In recent times, the number of Chinese restaurants in the United States is three times more than the McDonald's franchise.

== Notable restaurants ==
=== In Guangzhou ===
- 廣州酒家 (Guangzhou Restaurant)
- 蓮香樓 (Lin Heung)
- 陶陶居 (Tao Tao Ju)
- 裕景軒 (Yu Jing Xuan Restaurant)
- 泮溪酒家 (Panxi Restaurant)
- 大同酒家 (Dai Tung Restaurant)
- 西關粵 (Saikwan Jyut)
- 南園酒家 (Nan Yuan Restaurant)
- 北園酒家 (Bei Yuan Restaurant)
- 西關人家 (Xi Guan Ren Jia)
- 聚寶酒家 (JuBao Seafood Restaurant)
- 實惠堅酒樓 (ShiHui Jian)
- 炳勝品味 (Bing Sheng PinWei)
- 翠源酒家 (Zui Yuan Restaurant)

=== In Hong Kong ===
- Jumbo Kingdom
- Luk Yu
- Lung Mun (龍門大酒樓)
- Mak's Noodle
- Maxim's

== See also ==
- Dai pai dong
- Cha chaan teng
