= Forum Restaurant =

Coordinates: 22.2813°N 114.1822°E

Forum Restaurant (富臨飯店)
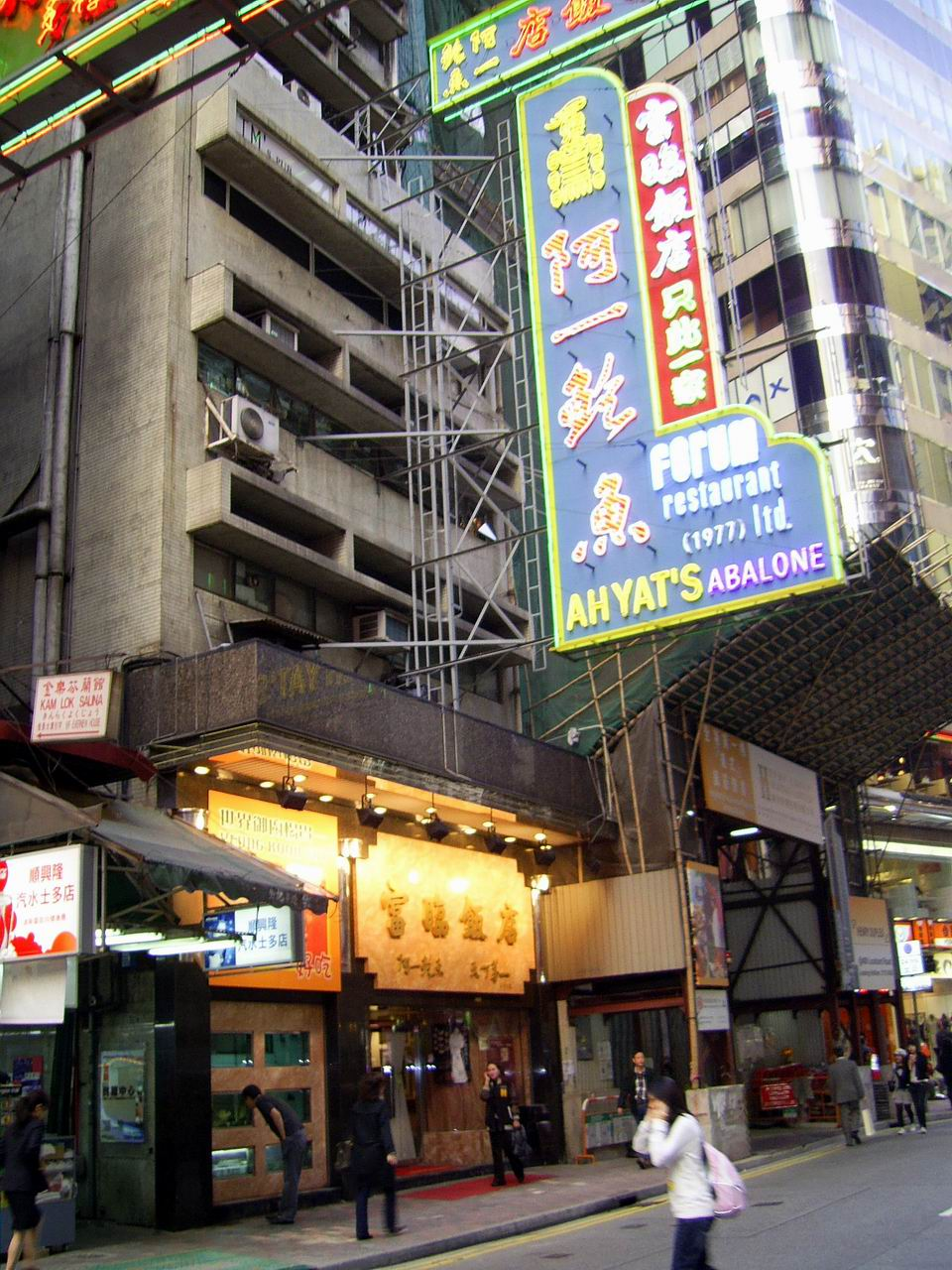
- Forum Restaurant
- Interactive map of Forum Restaurant (富臨飯店)

Restaurant information
- Established: 1977
- Owners: Anonymous Group and Yeung Koon Yat
- Head chef: Yeung Koon Yat
- Food type: Chinese
- Rating: Michelin Guide (2020)
- Location: 1/F, Sino Plaza, Causeway Bay, Hong Kong, China
- Reservations: 2869 8282
- Website: http://www.forumrestaurant1977.com/

Forum Restaurant (Chinese: 富臨飯店) is a Cantonese restaurant officially established in 1977. It is located at Sino Plaza, Causeway Bay, Hong Kong since 2014. Run by Hong Kong's international chef and ambassador of Chinese cuisine, Yeung Koon-yat (楊貫一), it is known for its expensive abalone dishes.

Yeung first opened the Forum in 1974 with some business partners, though it was not registered as a business until 1977. The restaurant struggled financially early on, and Yeung's business partners left the restaurant one-by-one until he became the sole owner of the business. Determined to make the restaurant succeed, he decided to become an expert in preparing abalone in order to make the business stand out from its competition. Yeung's abalone received positive reviews from businessmen and government officials that could afford dining at the Forum, allowing him to eventually get the opportunity to serve abalone to Deng Xiaoping in 1984. By 2020, the restaurant earned its third Michelin star.

== History ==
With HK$600,000, chef Yeung Koon-yat and some business partners established the Forum in 1974. It had not been officially registered as a business until 1977, as the partners individually left until Yeung was the sole owner and chef. Originally serving comfort food, the restaurant struggled initially with staying afloat. Realizing that a signature dish would make the Forum stand out from its competition, Yeung decided to become an expert in preparing one item. He eventually settled on abalone because "it was the food of kings, of businessmen, or intellectuals ...it's good quality and healthy." He also believed that he could improve how abalone was traditionally prepared.

Yeung spent three years learning how to prepare abalone, investing heavily into the process. The Forum's special method of preparing abalone initially attracted Hong Kong officials and dignitaries. After businessman Yue-Kong Pao endorsed Yeung's cooking to Deng Xiaoping, the chef was requested to serve abalone to Deng and other state officials at the Diaoyutai Guesthouse in 1984. The politician later claimed that Yeung's abalone was the best he had ever had. In 1988, he was invited to Singapore to cook for a three-day banquet, serving more than a thousand meals and raising his profile outside of China. Yeung went on to cook for leaders like Jacques Chirac in 1995.

In January 2014, the restaurant moved to the first floor of nearby Sino Plaza, as its previous site at 485 Lockhart Road had been rented to Tsui Wah Restaurant instead, at HK$1.22 million per month for ten years. This was an increase of 70% compared with the Forum's rental charges. The same year, the Forum sued Fulum Group in April, alleging that their chain of seafood and dim sum restaurants infringed on their trademark. According to the lawsuit, "Forum" and "Fulum" sound similar and are written with the same Chinese characters. In July 2014, Fulum Group announced that a coexistence agreement had been reached with the Forum.

On 31 July 2023, the Forum announced on social media that Yeung had died at the age of 90 following an undisclosed illness.

== Description ==
Forum Restaurant resides on the first floor of the Sino Plaza, at 255-257 Gloucester Rd in Causeway Bay. It specializes in abalone dishes, which Yeung is known for. The forum's signature dish is Ah Yat's abalone. According to Lonely Planet, prices at the Forum start at HK$2,100.

Yeung's method of preparing abalone involves initially re-hydrating Japanese dried abalone sourced from northern Japan, soaking and drying whole pieces for a day. Yeung states that when he initially studied how to serve the dish, he used Japanese preparation techniques as inspiration. Then, in a clay pot, the abalone is braised on layers of bamboo shoots and spare ribs. More bamboo shoots and chicken are overlaid on top of the abalone, and cooked at high heat for 12–14 hours. At first, Yeung used charcoal to cook the abalone, but later switched to using gas stoves. To test whether the abalone is ready, it is stabbed with a pin.

In addition to abalone, the restaurant also has vegetable and fish dishes that are more moderately priced.

== Awards ==
The restaurant received one star in the Michelin Guide inaugural 2009 Hong Kong and Macau edition and the second one in the 2018 edition. As of 2020, it holds three Michelin stars.

== See also ==
- List of restaurants in Hong Kong
- List of Michelin-starred restaurants in Hong Kong and Macau
- List of Michelin 3-star restaurants in Hong Kong and Macau
