= Summer blend =

Summer blend may refer to:

- Summer blend, a type of Gasoline
- Summer Blend, a variety of Black & Mild brand cigar
- ITC Signature Summer Blend 2008, a variety of A. J. Fernandez Cigars
- Summer Blend, a seasonal hard cider H. P. Bulmer
- Summer Blend Tea, produced by Heichinrou
