= Australia Dairy Company =

Restaurant in Jordan, Hong Kong

Australia Dairy Company 澳洲牛奶公司
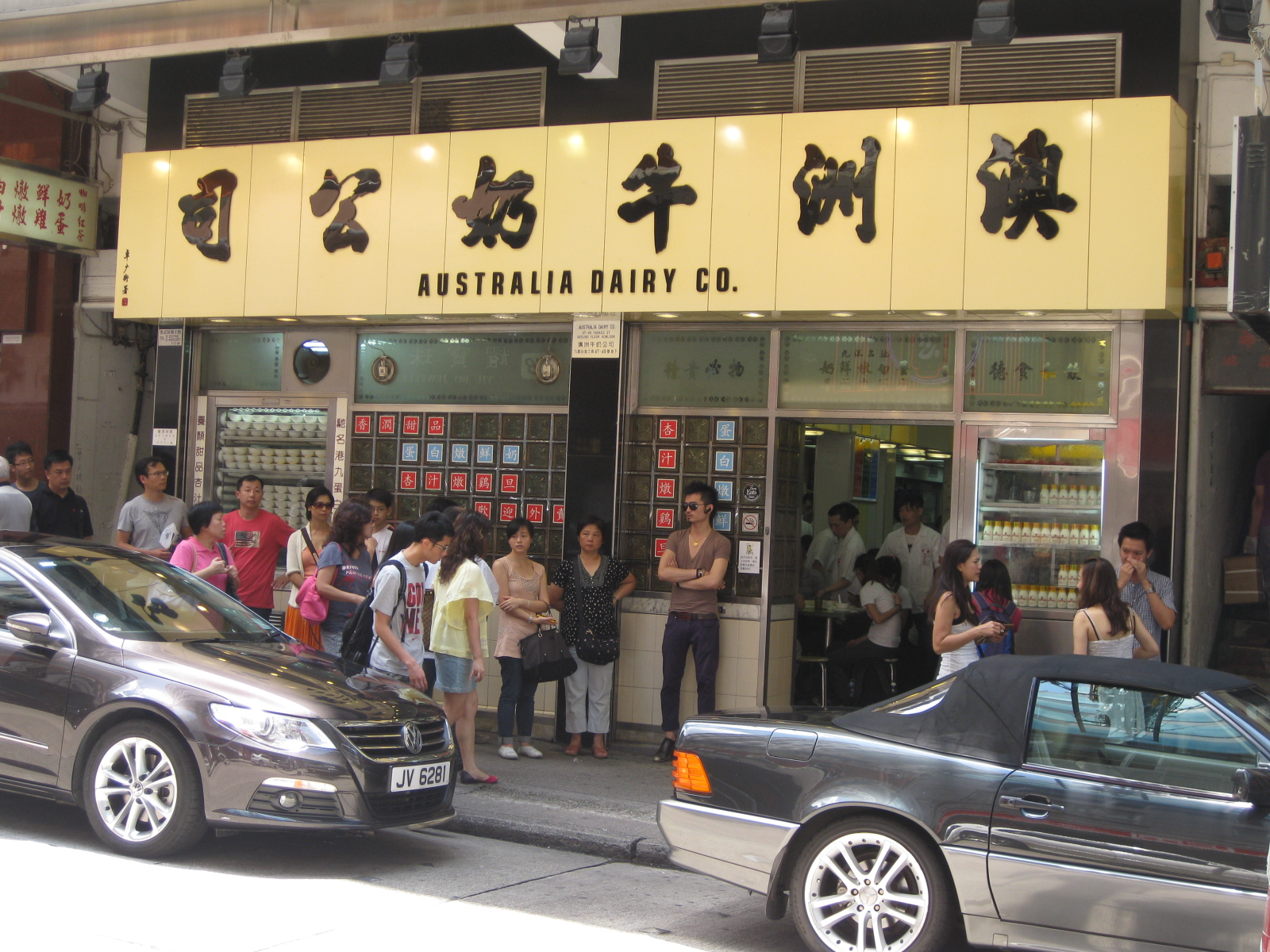
- Customers queuing outside Australia Dairy Co.
- Interactive map of Australia Dairy Company 澳洲牛奶公司

Restaurant information
- Established: 3 July 1970; 56 years ago
- Owner: 鄧林泰
- Food type: Cha chaan teng; steamed milk pudding, scrambled eggs, toast, and custard
- Location: 47–49 Parkes Street, Hong Kong, Kowloon, China
- Coordinates: 22.304613°N 114.170594°E
- Seating capacity: 106

Australia Dairy Company
- Chinese: 澳洲牛奶公司
Transcriptions
Standard Mandarin
- Hanyu Pinyin: Àozhōu Niúnǎi Gōngsī
Yue: Cantonese
- Jyutping: ou3 zau1 ngau4 naai5 gung1 si1

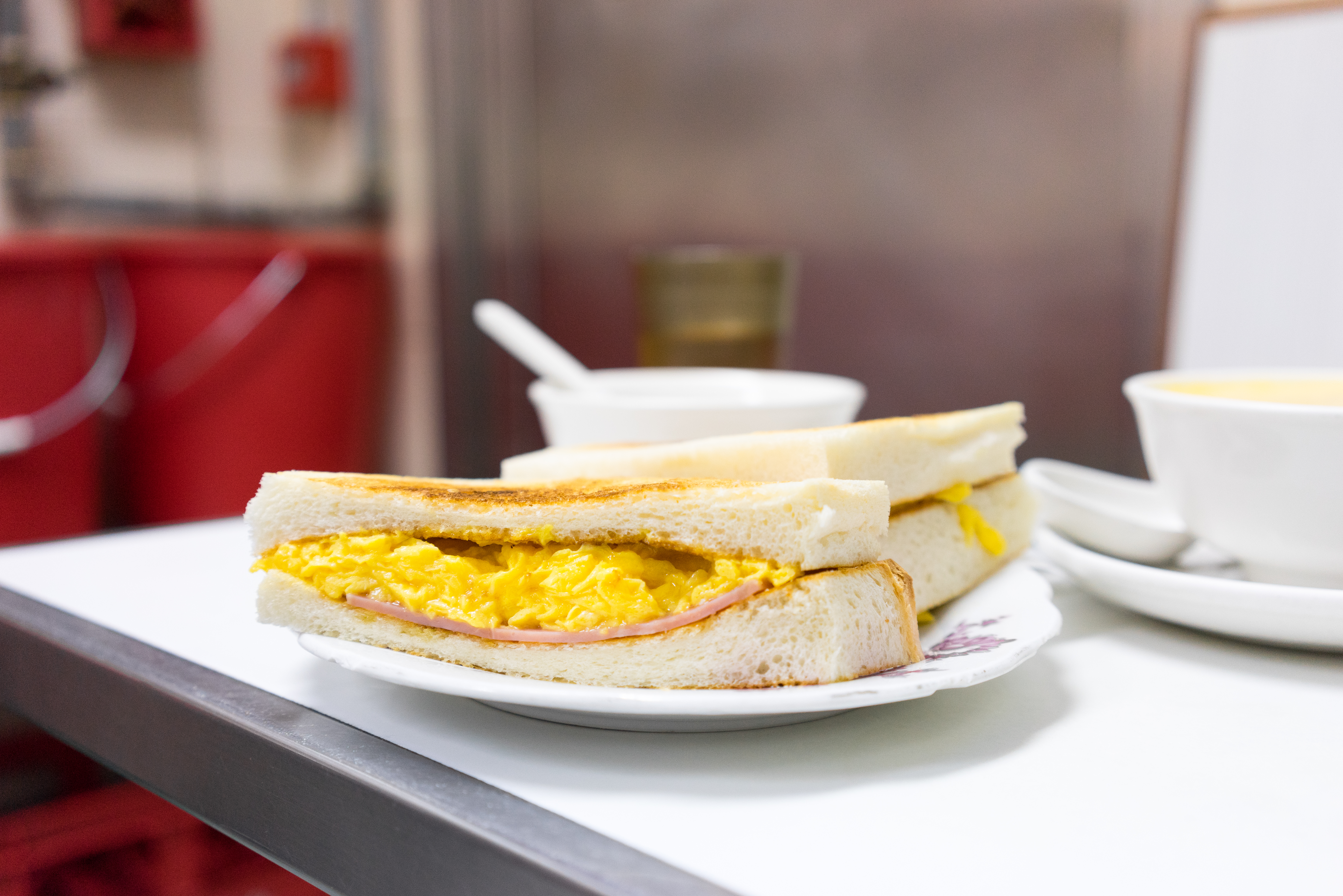
Ham and egg sandwich from Australia Dairy Company

Australia Dairy Company (澳洲牛奶公司) is a traditional Hong Kong restaurant, cha chaan teng, in Jordan, Hong Kong, specialising in steamed milk pudding, scrambled eggs, toast and custard dishes. The company was named by its founder, who had worked on an Australian farm in the 1940s.

The restaurant's brand name was coined from its high quality dairy ingredients being specifically imported from Australia. Founded in 1970 by the Tang family, it is one of the oldest restaurants in Hong Kong. It has been mentioned by The Guardian as one of the top 10 budget restaurants in Hong Kong.

The Australia Dairy Company restaurant is notable for its efficient but often rude service, with a short average customer visit length of only 10 minutes. It is also famous for its signature egg custard pudding and scrambled eggs. It has been described as an iconic Hong Kong restaurant.

== Reception ==
The restaurant has received various accolades in recent years, having been recommended by Asian lifestyle magazine CNNGo in their Best Eats Awards for 2010, and winner of the OpenRice Best Restaurant Awards, in the Best Restaurant in Tsim Sha Tsui (2014–15) district and Best Hong Kong Style Tea Restaurant (2008–2015) cuisine categories. Additionally, it has been mentioned by The Guardian as one of the top 10 budget restaurants in Hong Kong.

Australia Dairy Company has been described as an iconic Hong Kong restaurant, and a Hong Kong institution. Writing in The New York Times style magazine, Jade Lai sums up its aesthetic as "I like the aesthetic of this place—it's very Wong Kar-wai."

== See also ==
- List of restaurants in Hong Kong
