= Joy Hing's Roasted Meat =

Coordinates: 22.278385°N 114.176606°E

Joy Hing Restaurant 再興燒臘飯店
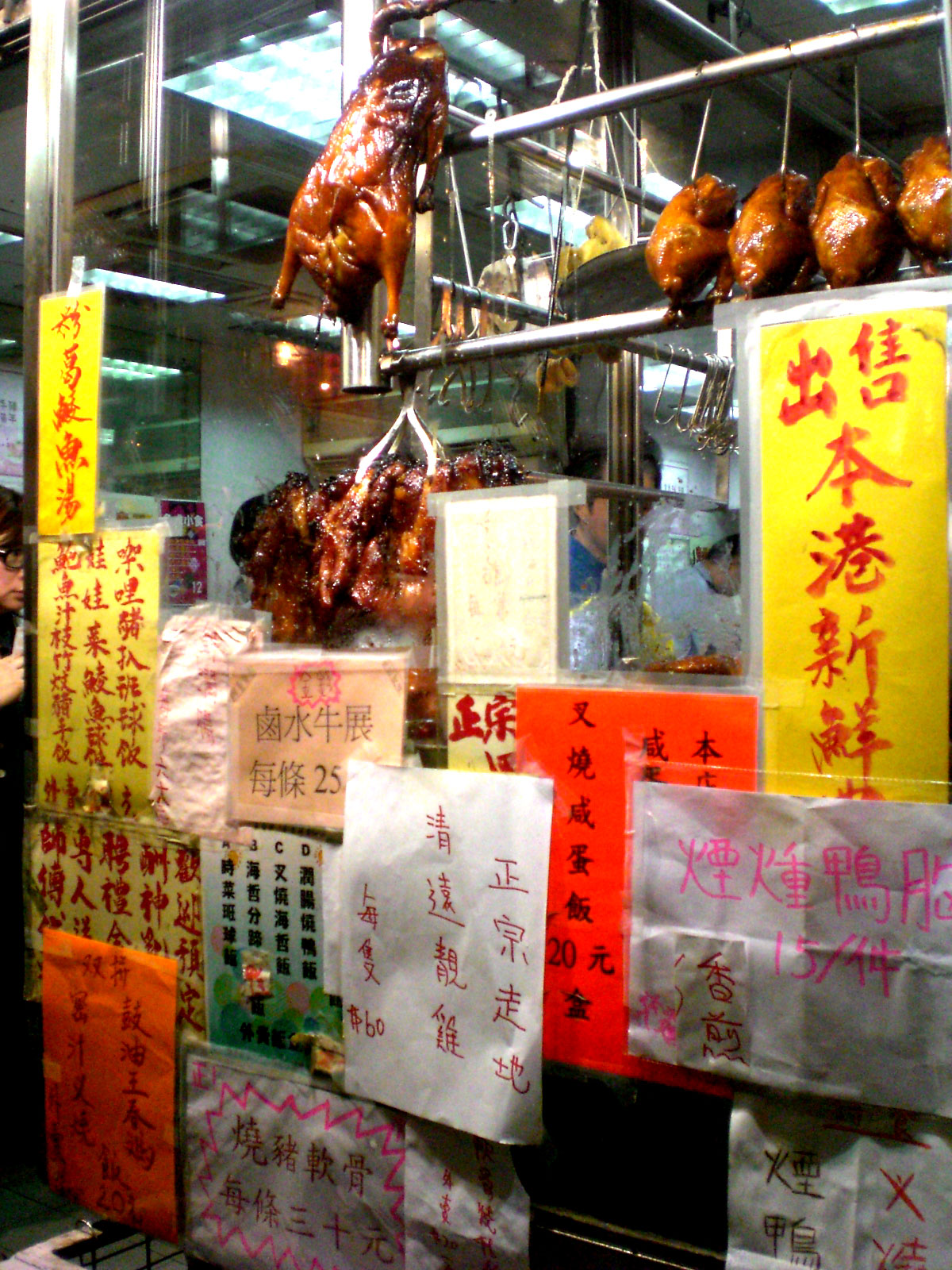
- Joy Hing in Wanchai
- Interactive map of Joy Hing Restaurant 再興燒臘飯店

Restaurant information
- Established: late Qing Dynasty
- Owner: Chau's Family
- Food type: Chinese
- Dress code: Casual
- Location: 265-267 Hennessy Road corner Stewart Road, Wanchai, Hong Kong Island, Hong Kong, China

Joy Hing's Roasted Meat is a Cantonese char siu restaurant in Hong Kong, founded in the later part of the Qing Dynasty.

The restaurant, recipient of a Bib Gourmand award in the Hong Kong Michelin guide and picked as the best char siu restaurant by a local food critics website OpenRice, is characterized by its long queue all day long and customers from grassroots to superstars.

== History ==
The business, run by a Teochew family, dates back to the late Qing Dynasty when the family started the first Cantonese Roasted Shop in Guangdong. The business moved to Heard Street, Wanchai, Hong Kong at the turn of the 20th Century as a dai pai dong, an open-air food stall.

Its operation was terminated during the invasion of Japanese troops in Hong Kong in 1941. After the war, it was named as Fuk Hing literally renaissance. The present name, Joy Hing, literally referring to "continuity of prosperity", was given a decade later, based on a superstitious thought that it could help prosper its business. Since then, the style of cooking remained largely unchanged.

With the rapid development of Wanchai into one of the Central Business Districts, the location of its old food stall was placed under removal order in 1980s. The shop moved to its current premises on Hennessy Road at the time.

== Style ==
The style of restaurant is classical Cantonese, specializing in Cantonese roasted meat siu mei and offering a range of products that includes barbecued pork, roasted duck, marinated steamed chicken, crispy roasted pork.

Joy Hing earns its fame from its strange preservation of pre-war cooking style, in which barbecued pork is roasted over a pre-war designed oven that creates a deep barbecue flavor. Up to now, chefs at the restaurant still use bare hands to check the temperature of oven, because the pre-war designed oven is not equipped with a thermometer. The old day equipment makes standardization impossible, and all baking relies on the experience of chefs. When asked about the recipes on the roasted meat, the owner Madame Yau once said, "I never learn it scientifically from my ancestors. I grab a big batch of different spices and sauces into it, try it until I feel right. Weird is the the [sic?] quantity that I feel right, which is different at the morning and noon, winter and summer."

Not until the outbreak of avian flu in Hong Kong in 1997, the compromise had not been made on the cooking of marinated steamed chicken. By classical standards, chicken had to be served medium raw, with little blood inside its bones, attached by soft textured meat. In response to the flu scare, the restaurant had slightly modified its original chicken recipe that was once kept over a century.

A renowned food critics Chua Lam said in his column, that "this old restaurant, surrounded by a long queue all day long, hardly bother to flatter food critics like me, and doesn't even care about recommendations from anyone because they know the best at maintaining their quality and keeping their customers."

== See also ==
- List of restaurants in China
