= Mott 32 =

International restaurant chain

- Native name: 卅二公館
- Type: Restaurant
- Genre: Cantonese
- Founded: 2014, Hong Kong
- Number of locations: 9
- Area served: Hong Kong; Vancouver; Toronto; Las Vegas; Bangkok; Singapore; Cebu; Seoul; Dubai
- Parent: Maximal Concepts
- Website: www.mott32.com

Mott 32 is a Cantonese restaurant owned by Maximal Concepts. As of 2024, Mott 32 has eight locations, including Hong Kong, Las Vegas, Vancouver, Bangkok, Singapore, Seoul, Dubai and Cebu.

== History ==
The first Mott 32 opened in Hong Kong in 2014. The name comes from the address 32 Mott Street in New York City, the location of the first Chinese grocery store which opened in 1891. In 2017, Mott 32 opened its first North American location at the Paradox Hotel in Vancouver. In January 2019, Mott 32 opened its Las Vegas restaurant at The Palazzo, at The Venetian with "a menu that pulls from Cantonese, Szechuan, and Beijing cuisines, and incorporates the restaurant's signature dishes." Vogue listed it as 2019's most anticipated restaurant opening in that city. Mott 32 has also added restaurants in Singapore and Bangkok. In 2022, Mott 32 expanded to Cebu, with a restaurant in Nustar Resort & Casino. Mott 32 also opening its Seoul location that same year. And in 2023, Mott 32 opened its first restaurant in the UAE, in Dubai.

== Reception ==
Mott 32 is one of the most awarded Chinese restaurant brands in the World, consistently winning awards for its unique interior design, signature cocktails and cuisine. Mott 32 Hong Kong, designed by Joyce Wang, has won several awards including the Tatler 2015 Best Interior Design and Inside Awards 2014, World Interior of the Year Winner.

The food at Mott 32 has been described as "principally Cantonese with some Beijing and Szechuan influences. The food aims to bring the best out of time-honoured recipes passed down from generation to generation.".

== See also ==
- The World's 50 Best Restaurants
- List of restaurants in Hong Kong
