= Nustar Resort Cebu =

Integrated resort and casino facility on Kawit Point, Cebu City, Philippines

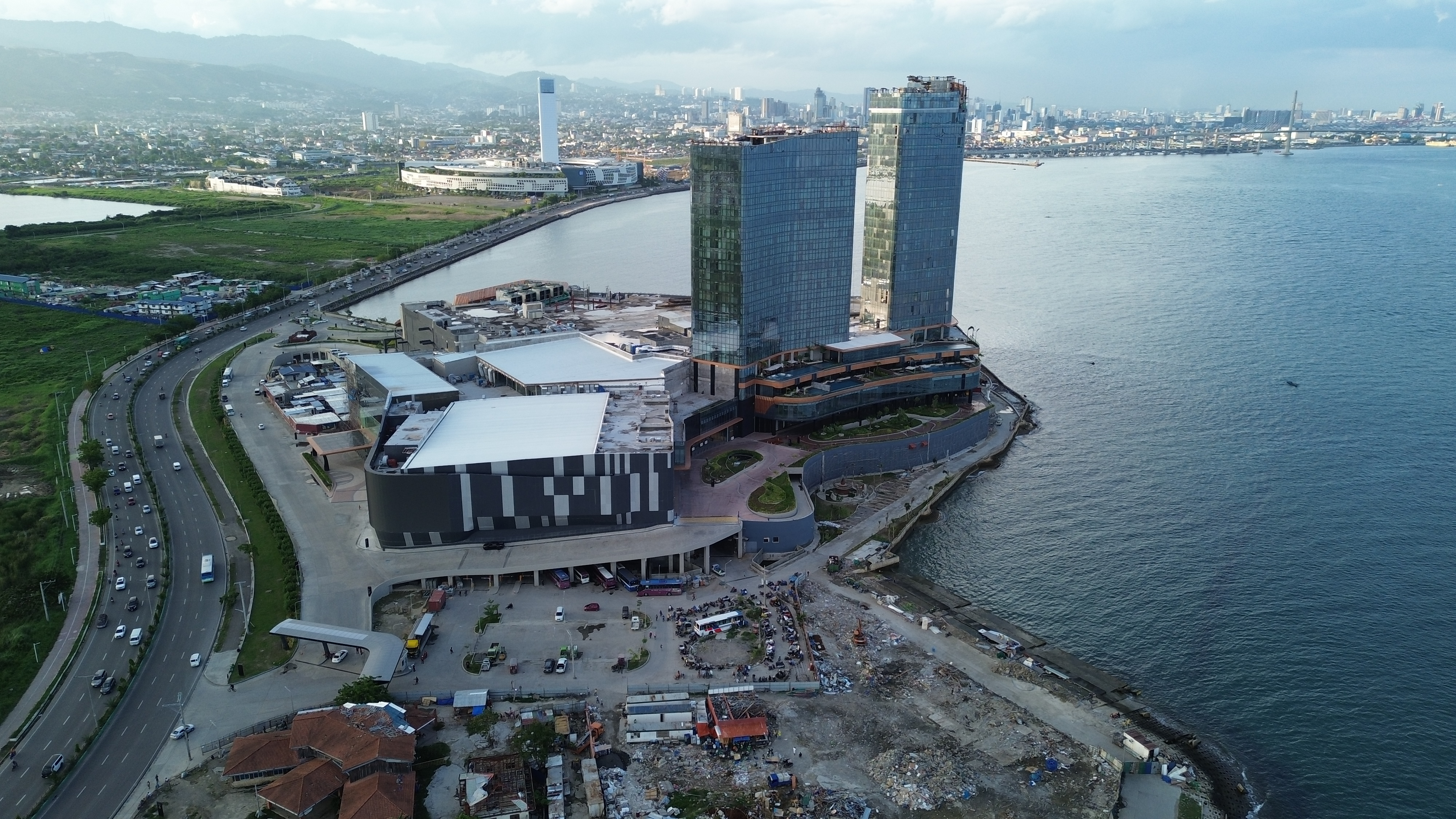

- Location within Metro Cebu
- Interactive map of Nustar Resort Cebu
- Location: Cebu City, Philippines; Kawit Point, South Road Properties, Cebu City, Philippines; 10°16′16″N 123°52′51″E
- Opened: May 8, 2022; 4 years ago
- No. of rooms: Fili: 379; Nustar Hotel: TBA; Grand Summit Hotel: TBA
- Gaming space: 21,000 m^{2} (230,000 sq ft)
- Notable restaurants: Il Primo Steakhouse; Mott 32; Fina; Xin Tian Di
- Owner: Universal Hotels and Resorts, Inc. Cebu City Government
- Operating license holder: Universal Hotels and Resorts, Inc.
- Architect: ASYA Design
- Previous names: Isla dela Victoria
- Website: nustar.ph

Nustar Resort Cebu (pronounced /ɛn.juː stɑɹ/, stylized as NU̲STAR) is a 9-hectare (22-acre) integrated resort and casino facility on Kawit Point (formerly Kawit Island), South Road Properties (SRP), Cebu City, Philippines. The project, which includes restaurants, bars, a mall, convention center, casino, park, theater, and at least three hotels, is a joint venture of the Cebu City Government and Universal Hotels and Resorts, Inc. The project opened partially in 2022.

== History ==
=== Development ===
Old render of the project, when it was still tentatively known as Isla dela Victoria

In a press conference on November 7, 2017, Tomas Osmeña, then the mayor of Cebu City, announced that Universal Hotels and Resorts, Inc. (UHRI), a subsidiary of JG Summit Holdings, had agreed to develop Kawit Point (formerly Kawit Island) in South Road Properties into an integrated resort and casino facility. UHRI would lease the property for 50 years and the city would receive 60% of the annual gross receipts. Osmeña said the project could generate 8,000 jobs and increase the appraisal rates for the lots in the area. Osmeña proposed the project be named Isla dela Victoria after former Cebu City Bantay Dagat project director Elpidio "Jojo" dela Victoria, who was murdered outside his home in the city of Talisay on April 12, 2006, for his role in the fight against illegal fishing.

A five-man committee was formed by Cebu City Council to scrutinize the deal's financial, technical, and legal aspects. A joint venture agreement was signed on August 17, 2018 by Mayor Osmeña and UHRI president Frederick Go.

=== Construction ===
The project formally broke ground eight days later, on August 25, 2018. Civil works commenced on the first quarter of 2019. The project would be opened as the Nustar Resort and Casino in May 2022.

The Fili Hotel's convention center had its soft opening in April 2022.

The Villas of five-star Fili Hotel has outdoor infinity pool, private office, powder room, sauna, gym, and view deck. Chef Martin Rebolledo Jr. and Rolando Macatangay are its executive and pastry chefs, respectively. The Villas has a prime P700,000-a-night suite, among others, awaiting the upcoming six-star Nustar Hotel. Nustar, as a destination includes Nustar Mall, with its “Journey of Flavors,” local and international restaurants, casino and convention center

On June 30, 2023, the Nustar Convention Center formally opened as the largest in Visayas and Mindanao. With capacity of 2,000 guests, it has 3 banquet halls, lobby, a pre-function foyer and hallway, open area and bridal lounges. Its 2,449 square meters interior has a 6 meters high ceiling.

The resort suffered a collapsed canopy and cracked walls during the 2025 Cebu earthquake on September 30, forcing the evacuation of 339 guests.

== See also ==
- South Road Properties
- SM Seaside City
- SM Seaside Arena
- List of integrated resorts
