= Joyce Wang =

Interior designer

- Occupation: Interior designer
- Website: www.joycewang.com

Joyce Wang is an interior designer based in London and Hong Kong. She has designed interiors for hotels, restaurants, and residences in locations that include Hong Kong, Shanghai, and the United States.

== Education ==
Wang attended MIT where she studied architecture and materials science. She later enrolled at the Royal College of Art and studied for a year at Delft University of Technology.

== Career ==
One of her first projects was for The Hollywood Roosevelt Hotel. Completed in 2011, the project took two years to complete and was credited by the South China Morning Post as putting her "firmly on the list of rising designers." Wang's first major project was the interior design of Hong Kong restaurant AMMO. She also designed the interior of the restaurant Mott 32, which was named "World's Best Interior of 2014" at the INSIDE World Festival of Interiors.

Wang was commissioned by Swarovski in 2015 to design a chandelier using their crystals, which debuted at Art Basel Hong Kong. She has also designed residences for Mandarin Oriental Hotel Group and residential projects in Shanghai. She also designed the club and spa at the Equinox Hotel in the Upper Eastside in New York.

== Design concepts ==
Wang is known for luxury fashion with clean architectural lines. She attributes her influences from Adolf Loos, Tom Ford, and Carlo Scarpa.
