= Pai dong =

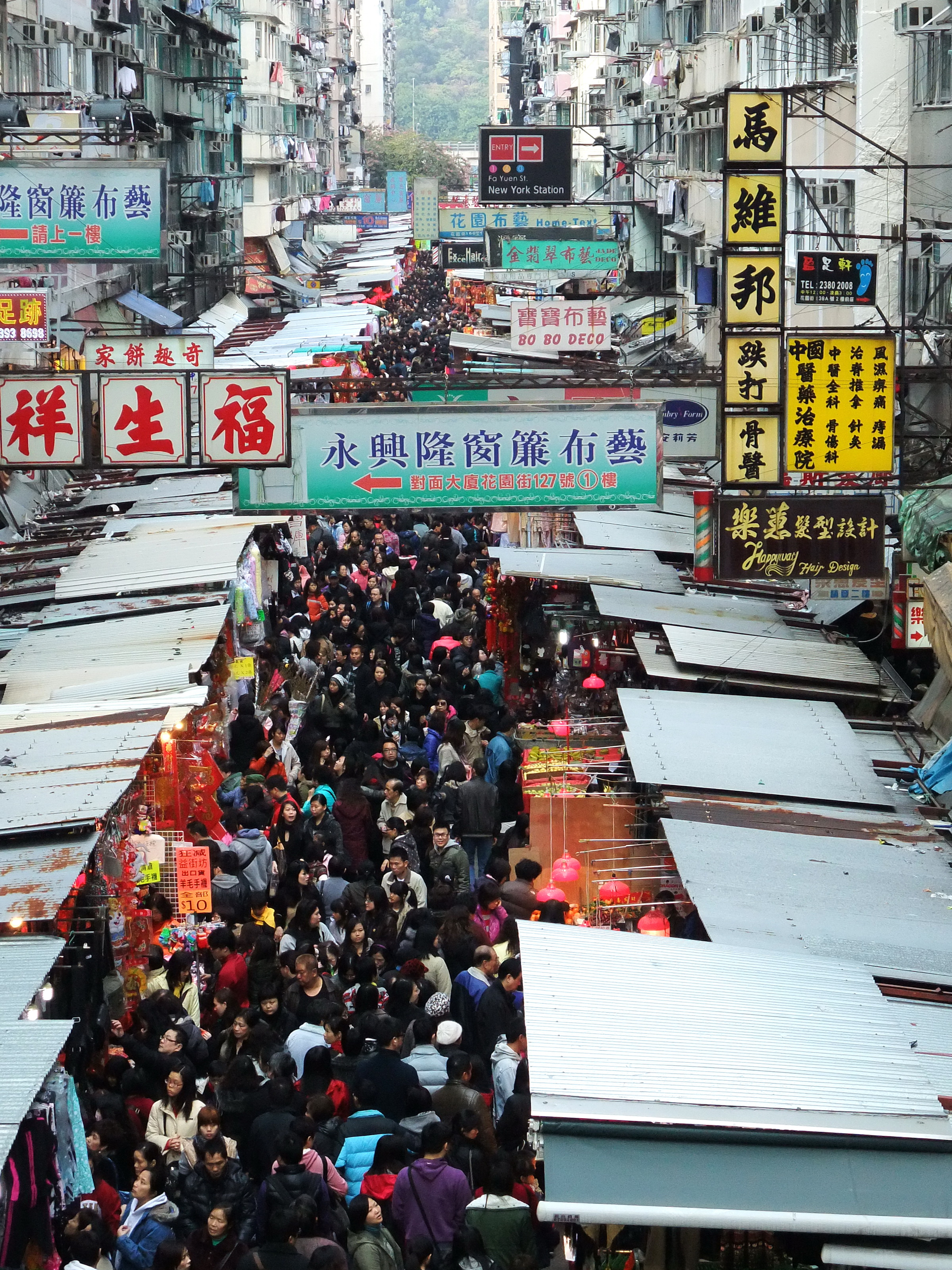
Pai dongs on Fa Yuen Street, Mong Kok

Pai dong (Chinese: 排檔) is a type of fixed-pitch hawker stall in Hong Kong.

In May 2013, there were around 2600 such cabinet-type stalls in Hong Kong, primarily in the urban area on Hong Kong Island and in Kowloon (such as Central, Wan Chai, Mong Kok, Yau Ma Tei and Sham Shui Po). They sell goods such as fashion items, watches or toys.

== Notable sites of pai dongs ==
- Temple Street (Yau Ma Tei section)
- Fa Yuen Street
- Canton Road (Mong Kok section)
- Tung Choi Street (Ladies' Market)

== See also ==
- Dai pai dong
