= Sino Plaza =

Skyscraper in Causeway Bay, Hong Kong

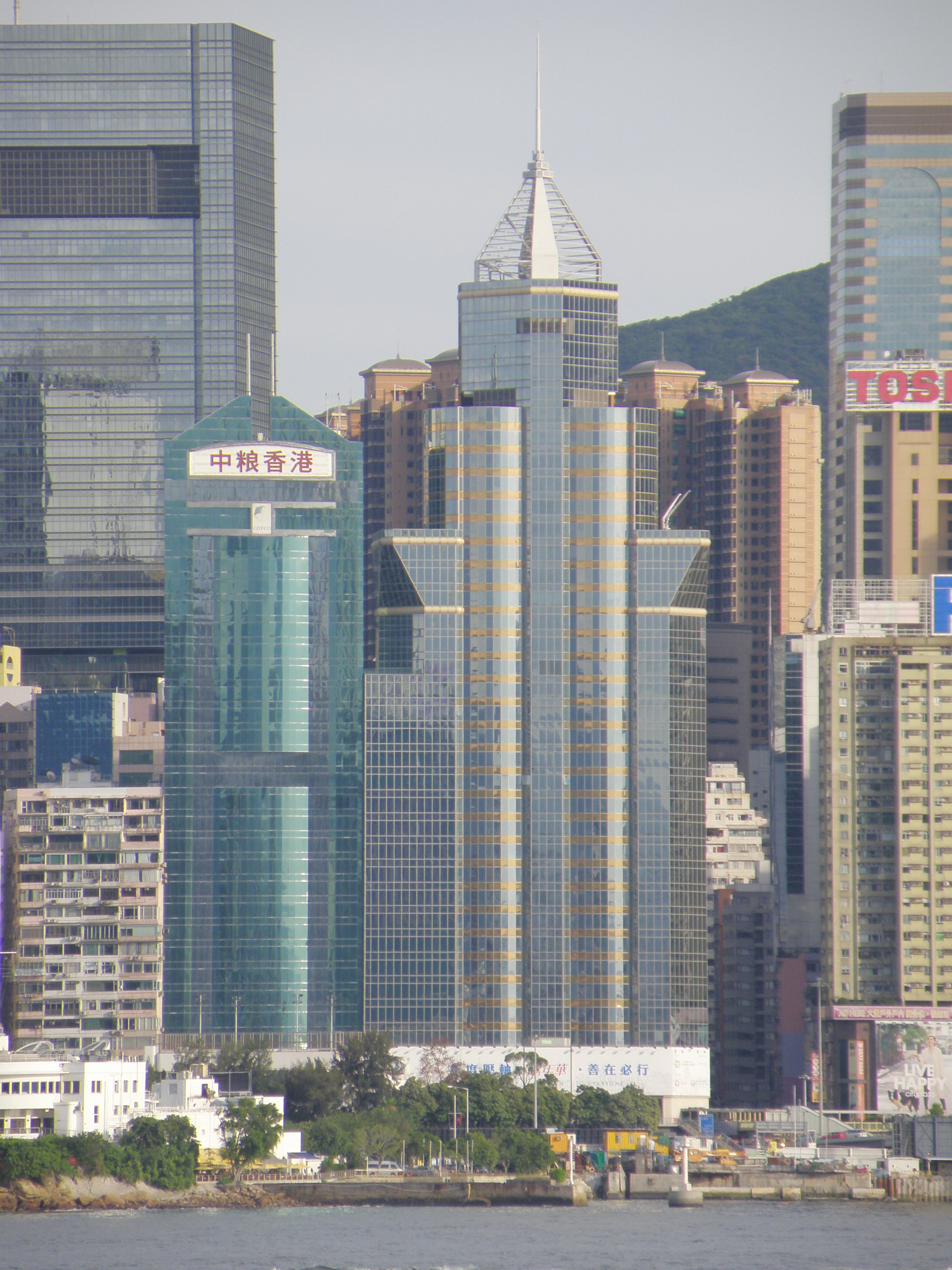
- Interactive map of the Sino Plaza area

General information
- Status: Completed
- Type: Office
- Location: Nos. 255-257 Gloucester Road, Causeway Bay, Hong Kong
- Coordinates: 22.28137°N 114.18223°E
- Completed: 1992; 34 years ago
- Opening: 1992; 34 years ago
- Management: Sino Group

Height
- Roof: 185 m (607 ft)

Technical details
- Floor count: 38
- Floor area: 32,564 m^{2} (350,500 sq ft)
- Lifts/elevators: 7

Design and construction
- Architects: Ho & Partners Architects
- Developer: Sino Land Company Limited

Sino Plaza is a skyscraper located in the Causeway Bay district of Hong Kong. The tower rises 38 floors and is 185 metres (607 ft) high. Completed in 1992, the building was designed by architectural firm Ho & Partners Architects, and developed by Sino Land Company Limited. Sino Plaza is the 85th-tallest building in Hong Kong, and is composed entirely of commercial office space. It has a total floor area of 32,564 square metres (350,500 sq ft).

In 2013, Sino Plaza was refurbished and a luxury retail shopping centre placed on the bottom floors. The redesign was by architectural firm, MAP Architecture & Planning, and was developed by Sino Land Company Limited.

== See also ==
- List of tallest buildings in Hong Kong
