= Heichinrou Hong Kong =

Heichinrou
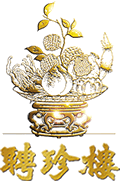

Restaurant information
- Established: 1884 (1988 in HK)
- Food type: Cantonese
- Location: Hong Kong
- Website: www.heichinrou.com

Heichinrou Hong Kong (Chinese: 聘珍樓) is the Hong Kong arm of the Heichinrou brand, separate from Heichinrou (Japan) though historically represented in both markets by Yasuhiro Hayashi (林康弘). The Hong Kong business was established in 1988 and first opened Heichinrou Seafood Restaurant in Tsim Sha Tsui before launching Metropol Restaurant in 1990 at United Centre in Admiralty, a dim sum and banquet focused venue that seated over 100 tables, the largest capacity among its Hong Kong outlets. In subsequent years, Heichinrou Hong Kong expanded with branches in Causeway Bay, Diamond Hill, Kwun Tong, and Central.

== Chief Chef ==
- Lai Wai-Hung (黎偉雄) 2003-2017
- Liu Wai-Shing (廖偉成) 2017-

== History ==
1988	Jun	Heichinrou Hong Kong entered the Hong Kong market
1988	Dec	Heichinrou Sun Plaza, Tsim Sha Tsui opened
1990	Aug	Metropol Restaurant (名都酒樓), Admiralty opened
1994	Feb	Heichinrou Times Square, Causeway Bay opened
1997	Jun	Heichinrou Plaza Hollywood, Diamond Hill opened
2008	Sep	Heichinrou Millennium City 6, Kwun Tong opened
2009	Nov	Heichinrou Sun Plaza, Tsim Sha Tsui closed
2010	Jan	Heichinrou Nexxus Building, Central opened
2025	Sep	Metropol Restaurant (名都酒樓), Admiralty closed

In 1998–1999, it won Champion in the Urban Council Restaurant Hygiene Competition for the Large Chinese Restaurant Group and in 2009, the Yasuhiro Hayashi awarded “Promotion and development of Cantonese cuisine contributor” award by the first China Canton Cuisine Summit, organized by China National Tourism Administration and Guangdong Government for long history of promoting Cantonese cuisine by building reputation and trust in health and safety, as an individual.

The Metropol Restaurant closed on September 27, 2025, after 35 years of operation. It was also announced that the premises were acquired by the Hong Kong University of Science and Technology for teaching purposes.

== See also ==
- List of seafood restaurants
