= Yung Kee =

Yung Kee Restaurant 香港鏞記酒家
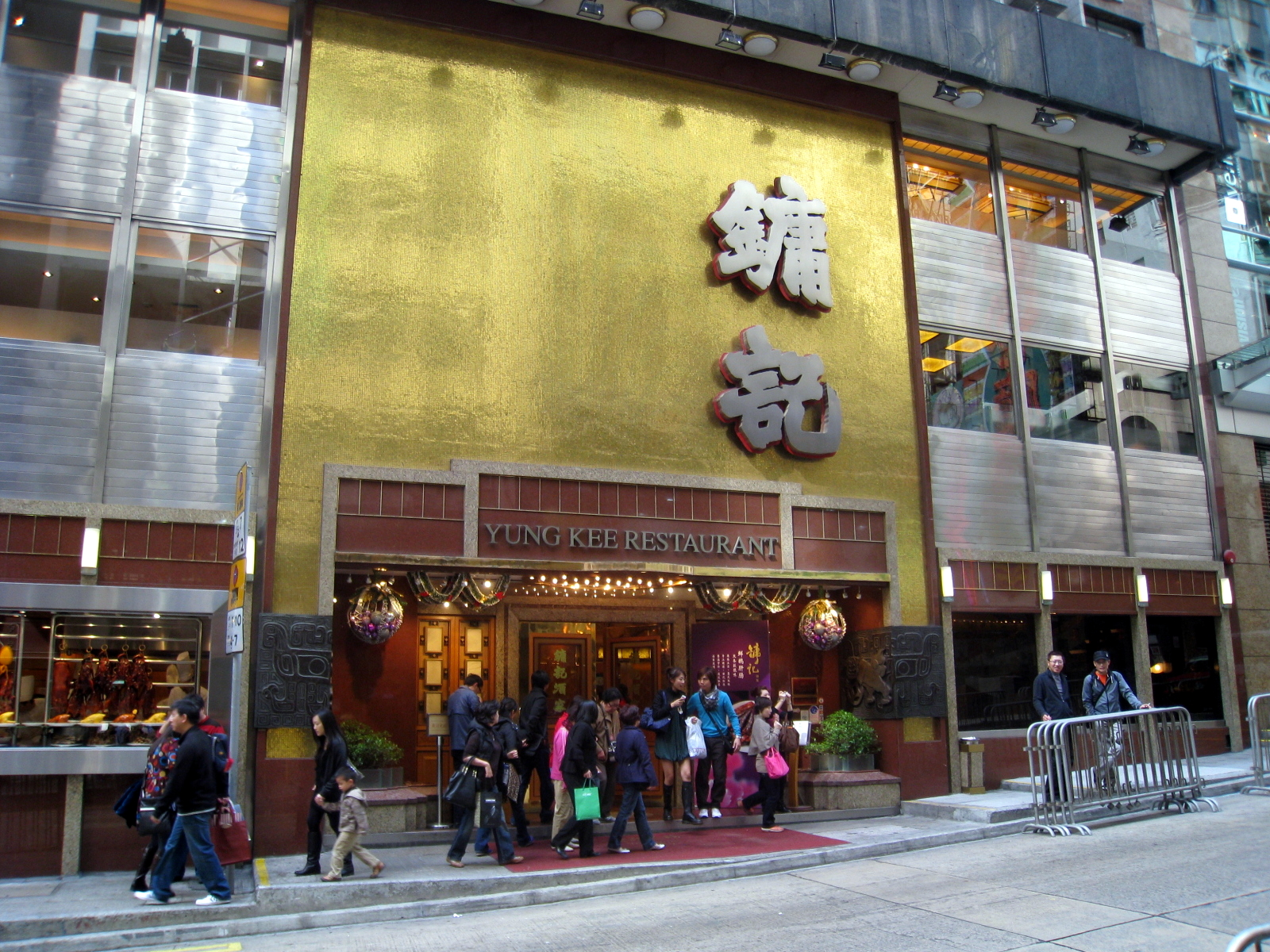
- Yung Kee Restaurant in Central
- Interactive map of Yung Kee Restaurant 香港鏞記酒家

Restaurant information
- Established: 1942; 84 years ago
- Food type: Chinese
- Rating: Bib Gourmand Michelin Guide 2012
- Location: 32–40 Wellington Street, Central, Hong Kong
- Coordinates: 22.281452°N 114.155599°E
- Reservations: Recommended
- Website: yungkee.com.hk

Yung Kee
- Traditional Chinese: 香港鏞記酒家
Transcriptions
Standard Mandarin
- Hanyu Pinyin: Xiānggǎng Yōngjì Jiǔjiā
Yue: Cantonese
- Yale Romanization: Hēunggóng Yùhnggei Jáugā

Yung Kee (Chinese: 鏞記) is a Chinese restaurant located on Wellington Street in Central, Hong Kong. It is most famous for its roast goose.

== History ==
In 1938, Kam Shui-fai (甘穗煇) began selling siu mei at a dai pai dong on Kwong Yuen West Street, near the old Hong Kong-Macau Ferry Pier. After some success, he converted it into a restaurant in 1942, leasing the premises at 32 Wing Lok Street in Sheung Wan for HK$4,000. During the Second World War, the building was destroyed in a Japanese air raid. In 1944, the restaurant was moved to 32 Pottinger Street. It moved into its current premises on Wellington Street in 1964, and after four more adjacent buildings were acquired, the lot was rebuilt in 1978 to become today's Yung Kee Building.

The sixth floor of the restaurant building is occupied by the Kee Club, named after Yung Kee and described by founder Maria Rhomberg as "a place for people tired of discos but still too young for formal restaurants and stuffy establishment clubs"; she met Kam in Shanghai to present the concept to him, and opened the club in 2001. During the SARS outbreak that year and again during the avian flu scare, Yung Kee was forced to temporarily stop serving roast goose and other poultry.

== Finances and ownership ==
Yung Kee is owned by Yung Kee Holdings Ltd, a private holding company with roughly HK$127 million in assets. In 2000, the two top floors of the building which the restaurant occupies became available; the company purchased those floors at that point, and now owns the entire building. After the death of the founder Kam Shui-fai in 2004, its shares were divided among Kam's children. One report stated that eldest son Kam Kin-sing (甘健成) (or "Kinsen Kam Kwan-sing") and second son Ronald Kam Kwan-lai (甘琨禮) each received 45%, while the remaining 10% was held by Kam's daughter Kam Mei-ling through her own holding company Everway Holdings Limited; she later sold it to the younger Kam.

Another report stated that the two brothers each received a 35% stake on the founder's death, with a further 10% owned by his widow, their mother, Mak Sui-chun. Her daughter Kelly Kam was also a party to the dispute. In fiscal year 2009, the restaurant earned HK$51.1 million in net profit. However, there have been continuing disputes among the two brothers about the management of the company, especially due to the appointment of the younger Kam brother's son Kam Lin-wang (甘連宏) as a director, drawing a salary of HK$45,000/month for only a few hours of work. In July 2010, the elder Kam brother applied to the High Court for liquidation of the holding company if the younger Kam brother refused to buy out his stake. The Court of Final Appeal, acting on an appeal filed by the widow of the deceased Kinson Kam, ruled in favour of the winding up order of the holding company registered in the British Virgin Islands based on the fact that the parties, property and dispute were based in Hong Kong. The net assets were stated to be HK$2 billion ($256 million) in 2012.

== Specialties ==
Yung Kee is most famous for its roast goose, and serves as many as 300 whole birds per day. A half bird—which serves up to six people—costs HK$240, while a two-person portion goes for HK$120. The late founder Kam is nicknamed "Roast Goose Fai" (燒鵝煇), and Yung Kee's roast goose has become well known in Guangdong, Hong Kong, and Macau, and also among foreign tourists. Some take a box of goose on the flight home to share with family and friends, giving rise to the nickname "Flying Roast Goose" (飛天燒鵝). Yung Kee dishes are served in first and business class on board Cathay Pacific flights, and boxes of roast goose and preserved eggs from the restaurant are sold in the on-board duty-free shop in an effort to take advantage of a growing demand for "souvenir food".

== Awards and recognition ==
In 1968, Yung Kee was named by Fortune magazine as one of the Top 15 Restaurants in the World, the only Chinese restaurant on the list. In 1997, four dishes from Yung Kee received awards in the Hong Kong Food Festival Culinary Awards Competition: "Wild Geese Resting on Plum Tress" won a platinum award, while "Fish Biting Lamb in Huizhou Style" (fresh carp stuffed with shredded lamb), "Celebrating Prosperity" (fish and chicken wings on a bed of stir-fried vegetables and shredded turtle meat), and "Aloe Vera with Golden Pomegranate" each won gold awards.

Yung Kee also once held one star in the Michelin Guide received in the inaugural 2009 Hong Kong and Macau edition, but on 1 December 2011, it was relegated to "Bib Gourmand" section of the guide's 2012 edition.

Asia's Top 20 Restaurants – Miele Guide

- 2008/2009: no. 8
- 2009/2010: no. 10
- 2010/2011: no. 12
- 2011/2012: no. 17

== See also ==
- List of Chinese restaurants
