= Trademark coexistence agreement =

Contract for two parties to use a similar trademark

A trademark coexistence agreement is a contract made by two parties to use a similar trademark for marketing purposes without interfering in each other's enterprises. Agreements of this nature are often made as parties only require regional use of their trademarks, and therefore other enterprises use of a trademark will not harm their business.

== Purpose ==
The purpose of a trademark coexistence agreement is that often marks are used by multiple enterprises in "good faith". The absence of a formal agreement does not undermine any enterprise using the mark as they are in different global regions. However, as the enterprises grow, overlaps can develop, and both parties can have substantial rights for using the trademark. In certain cases, companies who are expanding and using the same or a similar trademark usually enter in a coexistence agreement for the purpose of avoiding usage of the trademark in a way which is undesirable or infringing. Coexistence agreements can offer practical solutions to companies who are concerned about being sued for trademark infringement, as proactive agreements can avoid the large cost of litigation.

== Formal agreement ==
A formal trademark coexistence agreement recognises the rights of both parties to use the trademarks contained in the agreement for marketing purposes. The agreement can contain a division of regions in which enterprises party to the agreement may use the trademark, methods in which the trademark may be used, or classes of goods and services that the trademark may be used for (in conjunction with the Madrid System for the International Registration of Marks).

== Public interest and antitrust regulations ==
Public interest must be considered when entering into a trademark coexistence agreement. This often applies in situations such as if two medical companies bore the same trademark for unique products, as this could lead to confusion and have serious impacts on consumers. Companies must also consider antitrust regulations. Courts may find that similar trademarks may affect competition in the marketplace.

== Jurisdictional differences ==
In China, courts and the China National Intellectual Property Administration have in recent years treated trademark coexistence agreements with caution. For example, the Beijing High People's Court guidelines state that such agreements may serve as prima facie evidence that confusion is unlikely, but do not by themselves guarantee registration where the two marks are highly similar.
