= Heichinrou =

Chinese restaurant in Yokohama, Japan

Coordinates: 35°26′37″N 139°38′44″E

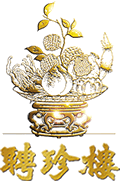
- Interactive map of Heichinrou

Restaurant information
- Established: 1884; 142 years ago
- Food type: Chinese
- Location: Japan
- Website: http://www.heichin.com

Heichinrou (Kanji: 聘珍樓, Hiragana: へいちんろう; Chinese: 聘珍楼; pinyin: Pìnzhēn lóu) was a Chinese restaurant located in the Chinatown of Yokohama, Japan. It was privately held and used to be the oldest operating Chinese restaurant in Japan. The Zhang (張) family first started the restaurant and operated for it for two generations, then the Bao (鮑) family for three generations until Tatsuo Hayashi (林達雄) took over. Today his son, Yasuhiro Hayashi (林康弘) operates as the seventh president. Heichinrou Japan and Heichinrou Hong Kong are separate entities with no financial association but both represented by Yasuhiro Hayashi.

The three Chinese characters of Heichinrou, (聘珍樓), means “a place welcoming distinguished, good, and wonderful people.” The logo was created by Alan Chan in 1988, presenting a basket filled with peaches, lily bulbs, lotus roots, laichees, bergamots and pomegranates, which represents longevity, forever love, good harvest, wealth, health, and children accordingly.

In 2009 “A Grand Exposition for Yokohama's 150th Year” took place due to 150th Anniversary of Yokohama, and Yokohama Archives of History edited and published “Yokohama Chinatown 150th Year.” An article which featured Heichinrou revealed that the restaurant was found in 1884 and that it was one of two stores which still remain on the same site with same name today, therefore, the establishment date was modified from 1887 to 1884 in year 2009.

Heichinrou was featured on the Japanese television series Iron Chef, with its chefs competing against Chen Kenichi (陳健一). Chen managed to defeat two of their head chefs before losing to the very famous Heichinrou's grand chef Xie Huaxian (謝華顕). Xie Huaxian was once on the worldwide TV series Yan Can Cook when it featured Heichinrou. During the show, Xie Huaxian was introduced by the host Martin Yan as the greatest Chinese Chef in our time. Xie was the acting Executive Grand Chef of Heichinrou Group from 1981 to 2009. The successor of Xie in Heichinrou Japan now is Hideyuki Nishizaki (西崎英行), the first Japanese national appointed as a Head Grand Chef of Heichinrou.

On June 4, 2022, Heichinrou began bankruptcy proceedings at the request of creditors, and was applying to the court for liquidation.

On May 21, 2025, Heichinrou began bankruptcy proceedings along with two other related companies for the third time, affecting a thousand groups that had reservations on the restaurant.

== Historical background ==
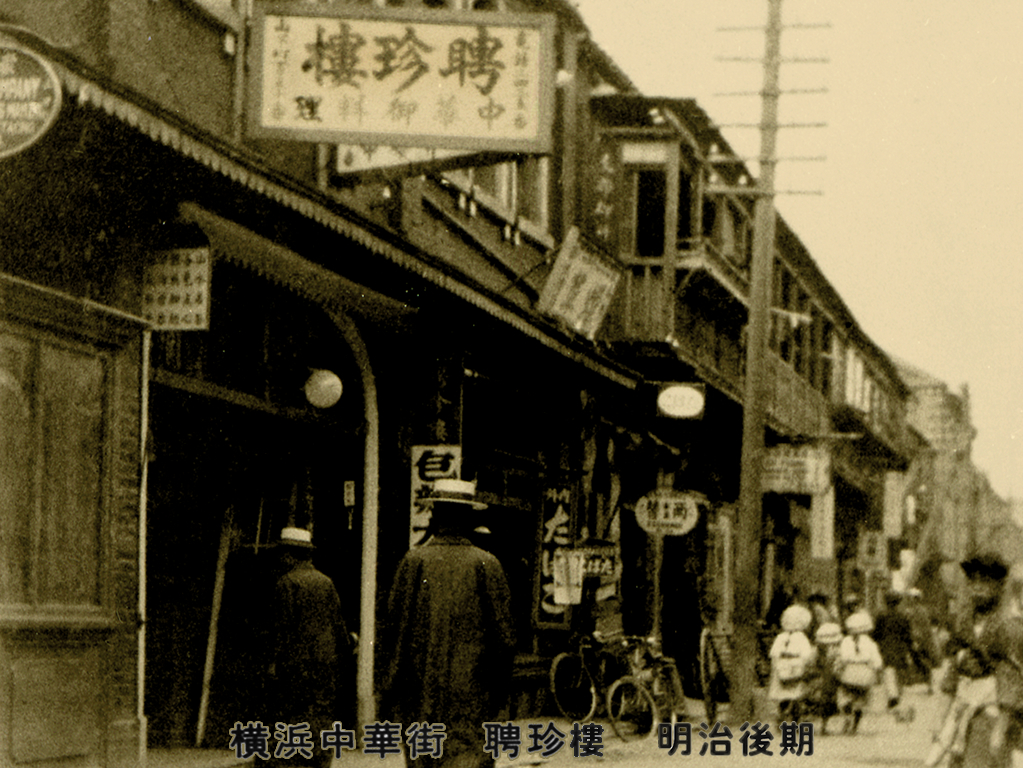
Heichinrou Yokohama Chinatown（1890s）

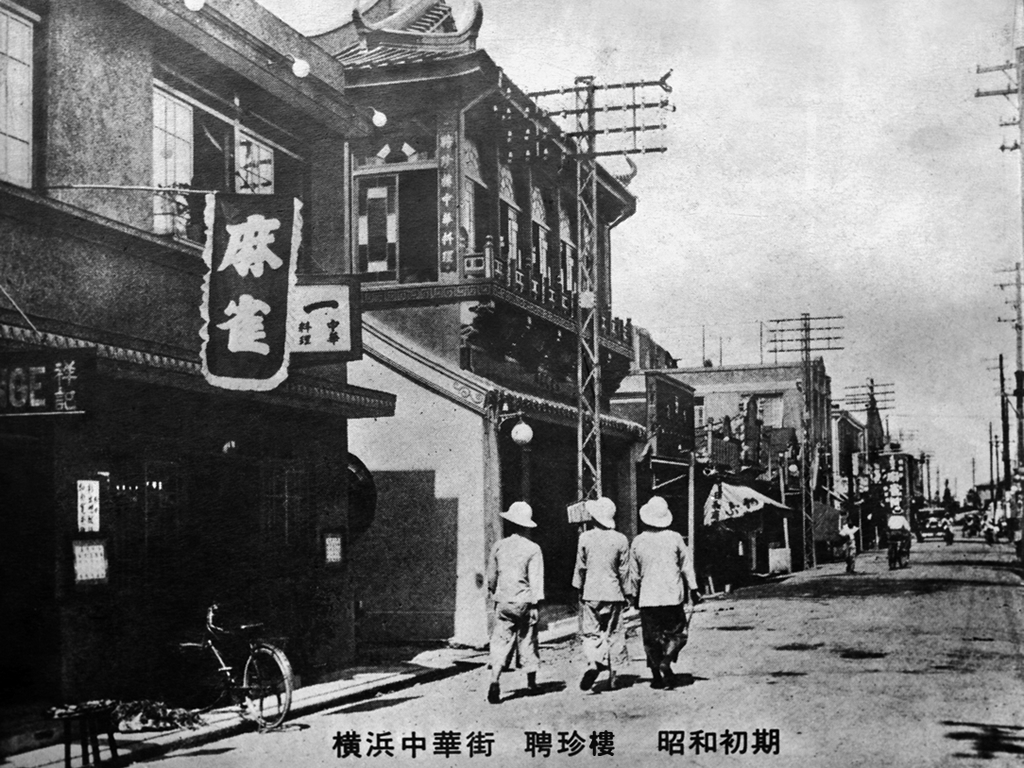
Heichinrou Yokohama Chinatown（1930–1940s）

=== Foundation/Establishment (1884–1974) ===
Heichinrou was founded in 1884 by the Zhang family on the current Yokohama site. There were cigarette shops on the ground floor, and the restaurant was on the second floor. Zhang Mao Yuan (張茂源) managed the restaurant. In 1923, the building collapsed because of the Great Kantō earthquake. It was reconstructed by Bao Zhao Chuang (鮑荘昭) and Bao Jin Ju (鮑金鉅), father and son. They operated the restaurant until World War II. Heichinrou was a well-known restaurant right after Hui Fang Lou(会芳楼) and Yuan Fang Lou (遠芳樓). (Today at Hui Fang Lou's (会芳楼) original Yamashita Park location, stands a monument called Hui Fang Tin (會芳亭 ). Both Hui Fang Lou(会芳楼) and Yuan Fang Lou (遠芳樓) are no longer in business.) Due to the Yokohama air raid in World War II, the Heichinrou building was destroyed once again. Bao Jin Ju was left feeling hopeless and lost his desire to rebuild the restaurant. Tatsuo Hayashi (林達雄, naturalized name in 1972, died in November, 1976), a friend of Bao Jin Ju could not bear to lose such an old establishment, so he stepped up to purchase the brand, building, and land in 1960. Tatsuo Hayashi (Chinese name Pang Zhu Chen “龐柱琛”) was born in Guangdong Gaoming Prefecture, now Gaoming District (中国廣東省高明県, 現佛山市高明区). Landed in Yokohama at the age of 19, he worked many difficult years and experienced a lot of hardship. When he was 30, he lost hope and returned to China. However, unwilling to give up, he re-pursued his dreams in Japan and trained to become a cook. Although Heichinrou was known as the famous Chinese restaurant at the time, due to years of war and instability, by the time Tatsuo Hayashi purchased the restaurant, it was only 45 square meters in size, selling only BBQ pork and sausages. In 1967, Heichinrou became a limited company, San Ma Min (生碼麺) was invented and a la carte dishes were also offered. In 1975, the business was inherited by his son, Yasuhiro Hayashi. By that time the restaurant had reached 80 square meters. In the coming years, Yasuhiro Hayashi successfully expanded the Heichinrou brand with branches across cities of Japan.

=== Tatsuo Hayashi and Chinatown ===
Tatsuo Hayashi (name before naturalization, Pang Zhu Chen, 龐柱琛), not only rebuilt Heichinrou but also was the founder of Manchinrou (萬珍楼). Furthermore, Tatsuo Hayashi was a respected leader playing a major role in the Yokohama Chinatown. He successfully built the 15 meter high “Chinatown” tower gate (Pai Lau 牌楼) with support of the Yokohama government and the people of Chinatown. It was a significant step towards the development of Yokohama Chinatown. Since then, the reputation of Yokohama's Chinatown has grown throughout Japan and the world. Tatsuo Hayashi died in November 1976. During his lifetime, he was one of the most devoted and critical members of Chinatown, widely respected as an honorable leader of the Chinese immigrants in Japan.

=== Branching (1975–1999) ===
The first branch opened in Kichijoji (opened in February 1978, closed May 2008), then Ikebukuro (opened October 2002), Hibiya (opened March 1980), Urawa (opened July 1981, closed June 1999), Shibuya (opened October 1982, closed June 1999), Minami-Azabu (opened June 1988, closed May 1992), Kichijoji (opened November 1988).

=== Hong Kong Subsidiary ===
Heichinrou Hong Kong subsidiary was established in 1988. The first Chinese restaurant to open from Japan. Business faced difficulties, as it was not accepted by local customers for the first two years. However, after more than 20 years, Heichinrou Hong Kong has obtained a reputation as a high-class Chinese restaurant for its history, quality, and service. There was also a branch in Tsim Sha Tsui, but it was closed at the end of 2009.

Hong Kong Branches:

- Causeway Bay Times Square Heichinrou
- Kwun Tong Heichinrou
- Admiralty Metropol Restaurant
- Diamond Hill Heichinrou
- Central Heichinrou

=== Expansion of Operations (2000–2007) ===
In the 1990s, Japan Heichinrou actively opened shops in many famous department stores and established Kanamori factory to produce dim sum, meat buns, and holiday gifts. Later product lines were expanded to include almond bean curd, Chinese sauces, and varieties of seasoning. This has increased Heinchinrou's visibility and brand recognition in major supermarkets. In 2000, established a distribution center in Yokohama to accommodate rising food business. In 2000, launched an e-commerce website, providing even more convenience for consumers to purchase restaurant's various dimsum and food items. In 2006, entered the health supplements sector by selling “Bird’s Nest” supplement, originated from the idea that “food and medicine should be from the same source, natural and healthy.” In 2007, organized a 120th anniversary event.

=== Current Status (2008-) ===
In April 2008, collaborated with Dydo Drinks to launch bottled, 500ml Jasmine Tea under the HeichinSaryo brand and thus entered the soft drink market. Later a series of drinks such as the Phu Erh Tea, the Spring Blend Tea, and the Summer Blend Tea were added to the list. In November 2009, during the first China Canton Cuisine Summit, Yasuhiro Hayashi was awarded the “Promotion and Development of Cantonese Cuisine Contributor” by the China National Tourism Agency and the Guangdong Government. Yasuhiro Hayashi was recognized for his long-term devotion and success in promoting Cantonese cuisine overseas.

== History ==
- 1884 Founded in Chinatown
- 1923 Sep Collapsed by Great Kanto earthquake
- 1967 Jul Heichinrou Company Limited established by Tatsuo Hayashi as president
- 1975 Jun Yasuhiro Hayashi appointed as president
- 1978 Feb Heichinrou Corporation established
- 1978 Oct Heichinrou Ikebukuro open
- 1980 Mar Heichinrou Hibiya open
- 1986 Apr Complete renovation and opening of Heichinrou Yokohama Chinatown
- 1988 Jun Heichinrou Hong Kong established
- 1988 Nov Heichinrou Kichijoji (New Shop) open
- 1990 Feb Awarded "Yokohama Townscape Award" by Yokohama City
- 1991 Jul Heichin SARIO Chinatown open
- 1992 Jun Heichinrou Aobadai open
- 1996 Mar Heichinrou Shinjuku open
- 1997 Apr Heichinrou Yokohama Chinatown building extended (New Wing)
- 1997 Sep Heichinrou ANNEX Mizonoguchi open
- 1998 Mar Heichinrou Sendai open
- 1999 Jun Contracted with Nishikawa Farm, Chinese vegetable cultivating farm in Chiba
- 1999 Sep Heichin SARIO Yokohama World Porters open
- 2000 May Heichinrou Tameike Sanno
- 2000 Jul Heichinrou ANNEX Kokura open
- 2000 Jul Distribution center in Kohoku, Yokohama open
- 2000 Jul Distribution center in Nippa open
- 2000 Dec E-commerce site "29man.com" launched
- 2002 Feb The CAFÉ Chinatown open
- 2003 Nov KozukueFactory open
- 2005 Aug Implemented Heichinrou Prepaid Cards and Gift Cards
- 2006 Apr Entered health supplement business
- 2006 Nov Heichinrou Osaka open
- 2007 Feb Heichinrou 120th anniversary event
- 2008 Apr Bottled beverage collaborated with Dydo Drinks release
- 2008 Jun Involve in “Food Bank” efforts organized by NPO
- 2008 Sep Participate in "TOKYO 2017 Oil" project, and begin oil recycling effort
- 2008 May Renew e-commerce site "29man.com" and changed name to "Heichin Shoppers"
- 2009 Nov Yasuhiro Hayashi awarded “Promotion and development of Cantonese cuisine contributor” award by the first China Canton Cuisine Summit, organized by China National Tourism Agency and Guangdong Government for promoting Cantonese cuisine by building reputation and trust in health and safety, as an individual.

== See also ==
- List of Chinese restaurants
