= Dai pai dong =

Hong Kong open-air food stall

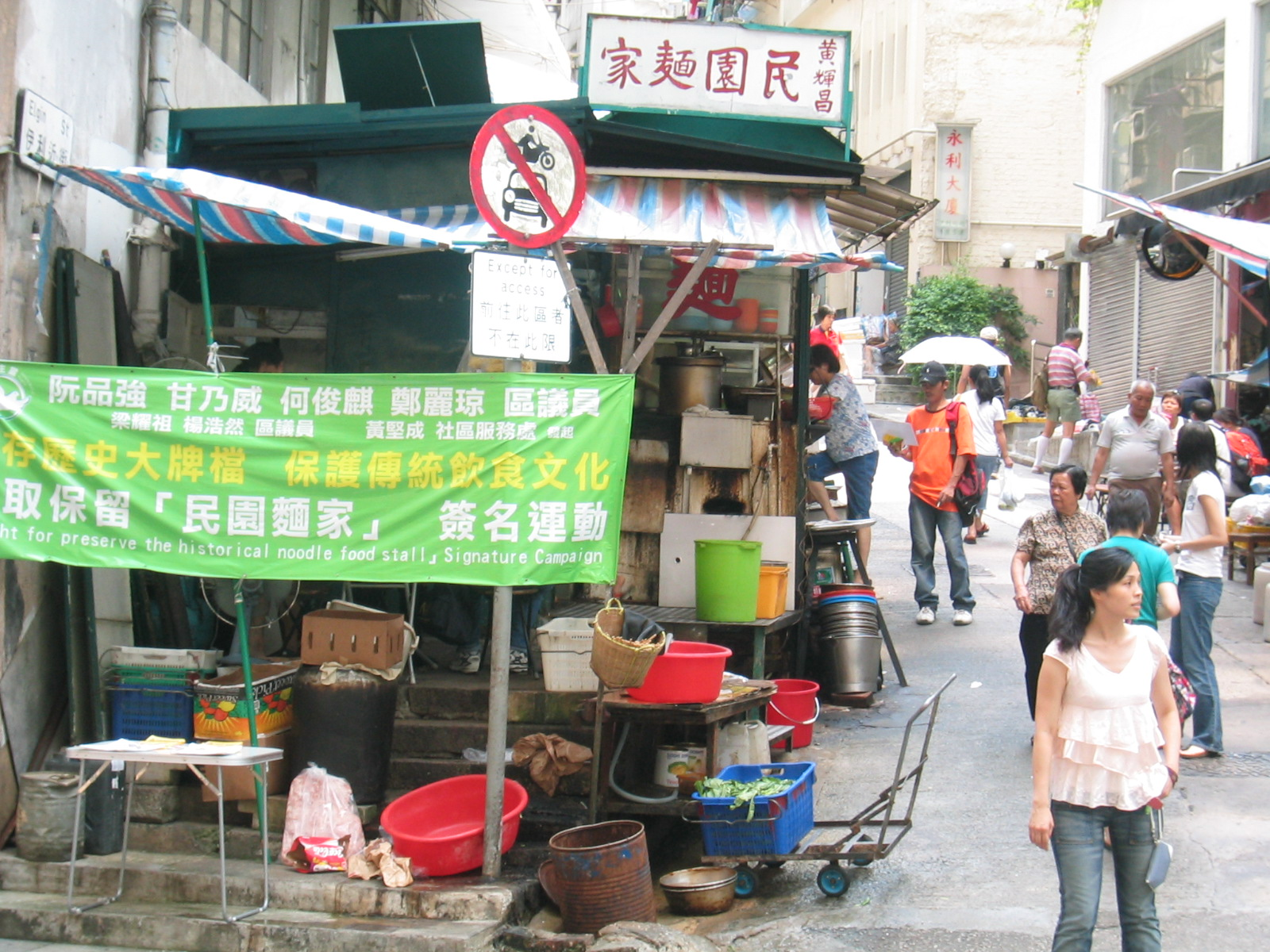
- Man Yuen Noodles, a former dai pai dong on Elgin Street, Central. The Democratic Party banner calls for preservation of the stall.
- Traditional Chinese: 大牌檔
- Simplified Chinese: 大牌档
- Literal meaning: big licence stalls
Transcriptions
Standard Mandarin
- Hanyu Pinyin: dà pái dàng
Yue: Cantonese
- Jyutping: daai6 paai4 dong3

A dai pai dong is a type of open-air food stall associated with Hong Kong. The Cantonese name means "big licence stall", referring to the unusually large licences issued to such vendors. Although the term is commonly used more broadly for roadside food stalls, in legal usage it applies only to stalls holding these "big licences".

Dai pai dong are associated with informal, inexpensive dining, traditionally operating in open-air premises and serving food cooked quickly in woks. The Hong Kong government stopped issuing new "big licences" in 1956 and subsequently restricted their transfer. From the 1970s, many stalls were moved into markets and cooked food centres, and a government licence-buyback programme introduced in 1983 contributed to a rapid decline in the number of traditional street stalls. The disappearance of dai pai dong has prompted efforts to preserve them as part of Hong Kong's food culture.

== Characteristics ==
A dai pai dong is characterized by its green-painted steel kitchen, untidy atmosphere, and lack of air conditioning, as well as a variety of low-priced great-wok hei dishes. Regarded by some as part of the collective memory of Hong Kong people, official dai pai dong are scarce, numbering only 28, situated in Central (10), Sham Shui Po (14), Wan Chai (1), Tai Hang (2), and Tai O (1) as of November 2005. The number had fallen to 25 by 2014, and according to the Food and Environmental Hygiene Department, only 17 remained in Hong Kong as of July 2024.

Although the term dai pai dong is often used generically to refer to any food stall operating on the roadside with foldable tables, chairs, and no air-conditioning (like those on Temple Street), legally speaking the term can only refer to the ones which have the "big licences".

In the Central and Western District, some dai pai dong have been described as "terrace type" because the sloping streets mean that the stalls occupy different terraces.

== History ==
=== Origin ===
The term dai pai dong originates from Hong Kong, but has also been adopted outside Hong Kong.

In Hong Kong, unlicenced food stalls providing cheap everyday food such as congee, rice, and noodles appeared as early as the late 19th century. These stalls served the general public and could be found in Central, Wan Chai, and the peripheries of the Happy Valley Racecourse. Stalls also assembled by wharf piers to serve ferry passengers, forming the so-called Waisik Matau (Chinese: 為食碼頭; lit. 'Gluttonous Pier').

After World War II came to an end in 1945, the British Hong Kong government issued ad hoc licenses to families of deceased and injured civil servants, allowing them to operate public food stalls to earn a living. This type of license was physically much larger than the ones normally issued, as a photograph of the licensee was required to appear on them. The license was therefore jocularly called "dai pai" (大牌; 'big licence') by locals, earning the stalls the name of "dai pai dong" (大牌檔; 'big licence stall'). The official government name for these establishments is "cooked-food stalls".

=== Decline ===
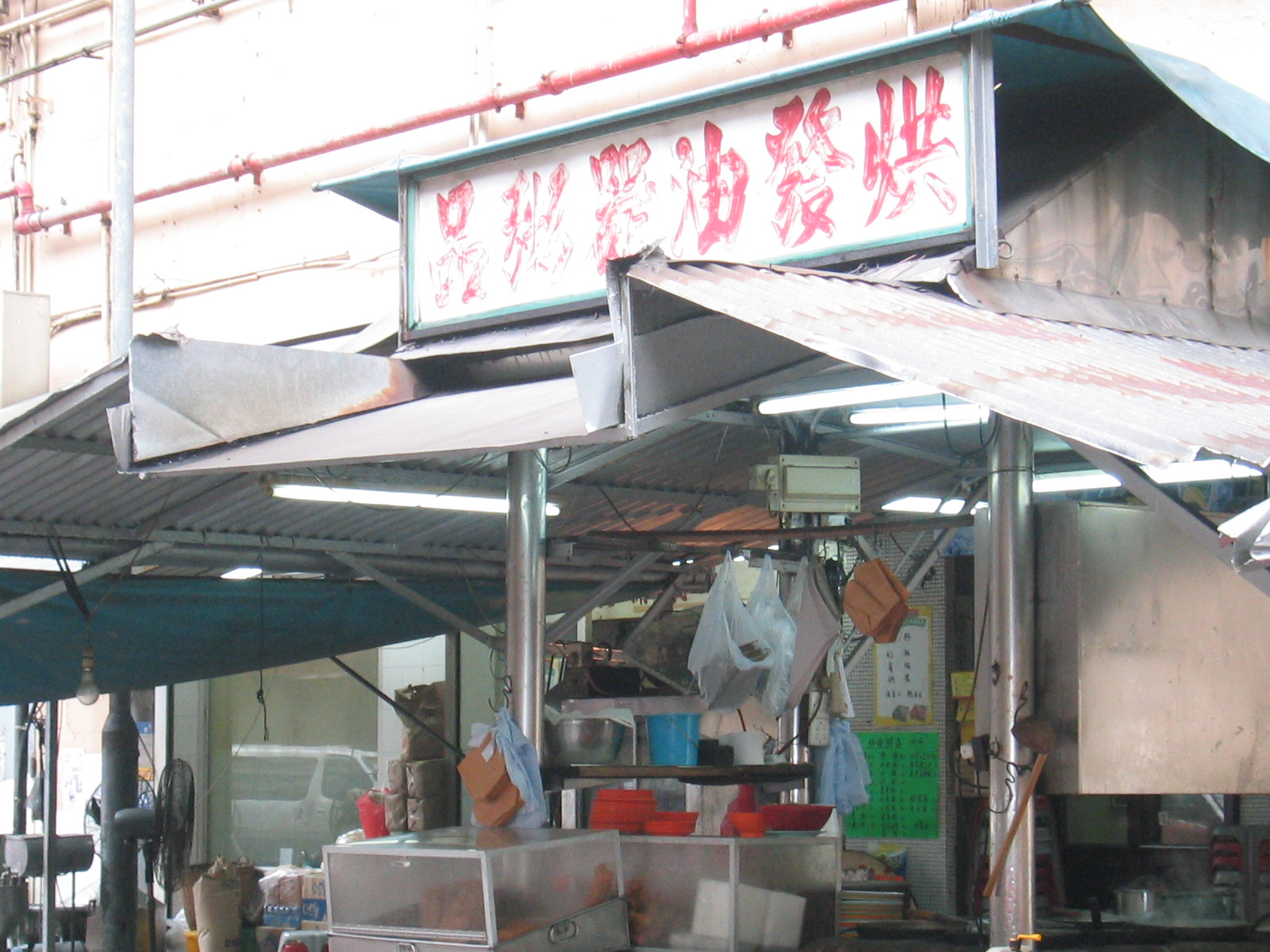
A dai pai dong selling congee on Yiu Tung Street, Sham Shui Po, in 2005.

However, dai pai dong soon became the cause of traffic congestion and hygiene problems, and some licensees even began to let out their stalls on the black market. In response, the government stopped issuing new "big licences" in 1956, and also limited their transfer. The licences could no longer be inherited, and could only be passed onto spouses upon the licensee's death. If the licensee did not have a spouse, the licence would simply expire.

Since 1975, many dai pai dong have been moved into temporary markets, like the ones on Haiphong Road, or into cooked food centres, usually located in municipal services complexes managed by the Urban Council, for easier control. Some were relocated into indoor cooked food markets built by the government. To improve worsening public hygiene, the government began to buy back "big licenses" from license-holders in 1983. Due to the old age of most licensees and the legal restrictions on transferring licenses, many stall owners were willing to return their licenses for compensation. Since then, the number of traditional dai pai dong has declined rapidly.

Since the decline of dai pai dong from the 1970s, most have no longer operated within the family, but through sole proprietorship or partnership instead.

Today, most dai pai dong survive by operating in cooked food centers, while the more successful ones have reinvented themselves as air-conditioned restaurants (some of them keep their original stalls operating at the same time, like Lan Fong Yuen (蘭芳園) in Gage Street, Central).

It was reported that revenues of dai pai dong increased considerably in 2003 when Hong Kong was plagued by SARS, as people regarded air-conditioned places as hotbeds of the virus and patronised open-air and sun-lit stalls instead.

== Features ==
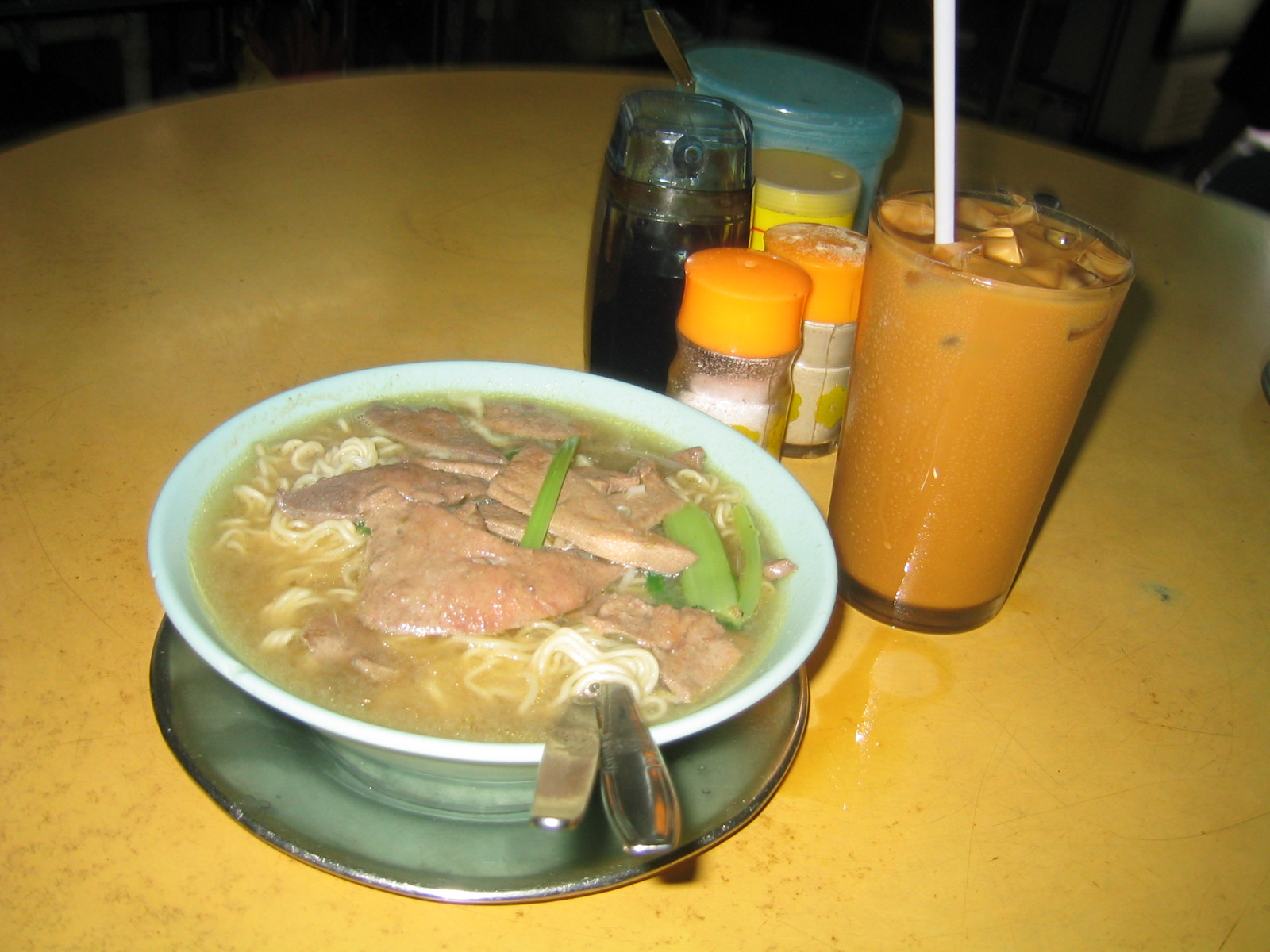
Milk tea and a bowl of instant noodle with pig liver, served at a dai pai dong on Yiu Tung Street, Sham Shui Po.

- Diners can tailor dishes on the menu to their liking, such as asking for a non-spicy variation.
- Sharing tables with strangers is customary when there is a shortage of seating.
- Some dai pai dong have problems with hygiene and upkeep, for example, rickety tables and stools, battered metal pots and bamboo chopsticks, and unappetizingly slick floors.
- As dai pai dong is set up by four canvas stands, all one-storey tall, into the road it is better to add a cover, prevent some stuff dropped while people eating.
- Many dishes are cooked in a wok over a large flame. Chefs cook quickly and utilise stir-frying techniques to mix flavours and ingredients speedily.
- Unlike cha chaan teng, most dai pai dong do not provide set meals.
- "Cross-stall ordering" is possible: for instance, when one is sitting and eating in a stall selling noodles, he or she can order a cup of milk tea from another stall, which may be several stalls away.
- Stalls can roughly be divided into operating at daytime or nighttime. The nighttime dai pai dong usually serve seafood and other more costly dishes, with one dish usually costing 40–70 Hong Kong dollars. Meanwhile, the day-time dai pai dong usually serves cheaper food, including:
  - congee and youtiao (known as yau cha kwai in Cantonese);
  - Hong Kong–style milk tea, toasts, sandwiches, instant noodles with ham, egg, luncheon meat or sausage;
  - rice or noodles with siu mei (燒味, roasted meats);
  - fried rice and dip tau fan (碟頭飯, rice plates);
  - Chiuchow-style noodles.

== Preservation ==
In May 2005, the existence of dai pai dong in Hong Kong caught considerable public attention, as Man Yuen Noodles, a dai pai dong selling noodles in Central, faced imminent closure due to the death of the licensee. The news came after the closure of a bakery notable for its egg tarts, also located in Central and forced to close because of the rise of rent.

Despite calls for its preservation by many locals, including some politicians, the stall was closed on 30 July 2005. The Hong Kong government was criticised for not trying its best to preserve dai pai dong as part of the Hong Kong culture. The news of the closure coincided with the government's proposal of the development of West Kowloon Cultural District. The bakery reopened in October 2005. The stall unexpectedly reopened at a nearby shop on 1 December 2005.

The term dai pai dong was added to the Oxford English Dictionary in its March 2016 update.

== See also ==
- Cantonese restaurant
- Cart noodle
- Hawkers in Hong Kong
- Pai dong
