= OpenRice =

Food and restaurant guide website

OpenRice 開飯喇
- Available in: Chinese, English, Thai, Japanese, Indonesian
- Headquarters: Hong Kong
- Owner: JDB Holdings Limited
- Creators: Ray Chung, Michael Tong, Gladys Li, Johnny Lam, Paul Cheng, Winnie Chan, Olivia Leung, Jodie Cheung
- Website: Official website
- Commercial: Yes
- Launched: 1999
- Current status: Active

OpenRice (Chinese: 開飯喇!) is a food and restaurant guide website headquartered in Hong Kong and operating in Asia. The website encourages reviews from its users, similar to Yelp and Tripadvisor, and ranks them based on the number of reviews posted and how many of them are recommended by the website's editor. As of March 2014, OpenRice lists approximately one million restaurants worldwide, recording about 1.6 million total reviews.

== History ==
OpenRice was founded in 1999 by Ray Chung Wai-man and his friends. The parent company closed only a year after launch, leaving Chung, who had previously been an IT executive, to keep the website alive using minimal resources at his home.

In 2007, OpenRice was bought by digital media company JDB Holdings, which has since expanded the site into other Asian regions. As of March 2014, the website operates in Hong Kong, Macau, mainland China, Malaysia, Taiwan, Singapore, Indonesia, Thailand, and the Philippines.

Initially launched for Hong Kong (with the traditional Chinese version only) in 1999, the English version was later introduced in 2009.

== Criticism ==
Since the website's takeover by JDB Holdings in 2007, OpenRice has been criticised for allowing restaurants to buy advertisements on the site. In a 2014 article published by the South China Morning Post, it was revealed that restaurants could pay to "take advantage of [OpenRice's] reservation engine", design a personalised webpage, and be listed under the "Featured Restaurants" tab, among other features. In response, OpenRice refutes claims of conflicts of interest, saying that their marketing and editorial teams are separate, and that it does not allow restaurants to influence reviews.

As OpenRice grows in influence in Hong Kong, some restaurants have also reported being hesitant to openly criticise the website, saying that "[OpenRice] will put out bad reviews of your restaurant" in retaliation. These claims remain anecdotal and are dismissed by OpenRice as "ridiculous".

== See also ==
- Chinese cuisine
- Hong Kong cuisine
- List of websites about food and drink
- Singaporean cuisine
