= Waldorf Astoria Shanghai on the Bund =

Hotel in Huangpu, Shanghai, China

- 上海外滩华尔道夫酒店
- Interactive map of the Waldorf Astoria; Shanghai on the Bund area
- Hotel chain: Waldorf Astoria

General information
- Location: Shanghai Club Building, No. 2 Zhongshan East 1st Road, Huangpu District, Shanghai
- Coordinates: 31°14′09″N 121°29′12″E
- Opened: 2010
- Management: Hilton Worldwide

Technical details
- Floor count: Heritage Building: 3 Waldorf Astoria Tower: 24

Other information
- Number of rooms: 252
- Number of suites: 20
- Number of restaurants: 6

Website
- Official website

The Waldorf Astoria Shanghai on the Bund is a luxury hotel located along The Bund, in Shanghai's Huangpu District, in China. Part of the Waldorf Astoria Hotels & Resorts chain, the hotel is housed within the Shanghai Club Building.

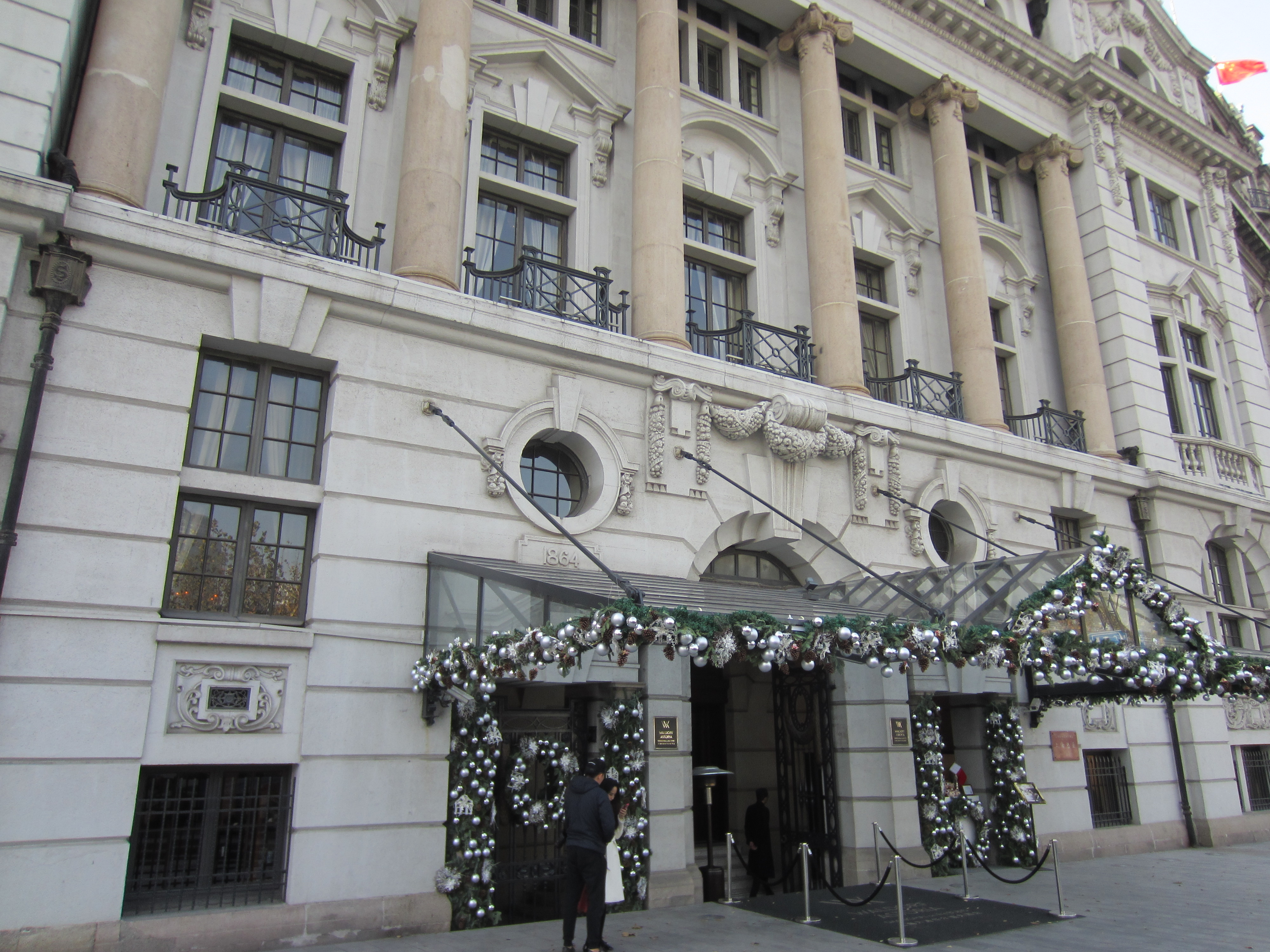
The hotel building's neoclassical exterior

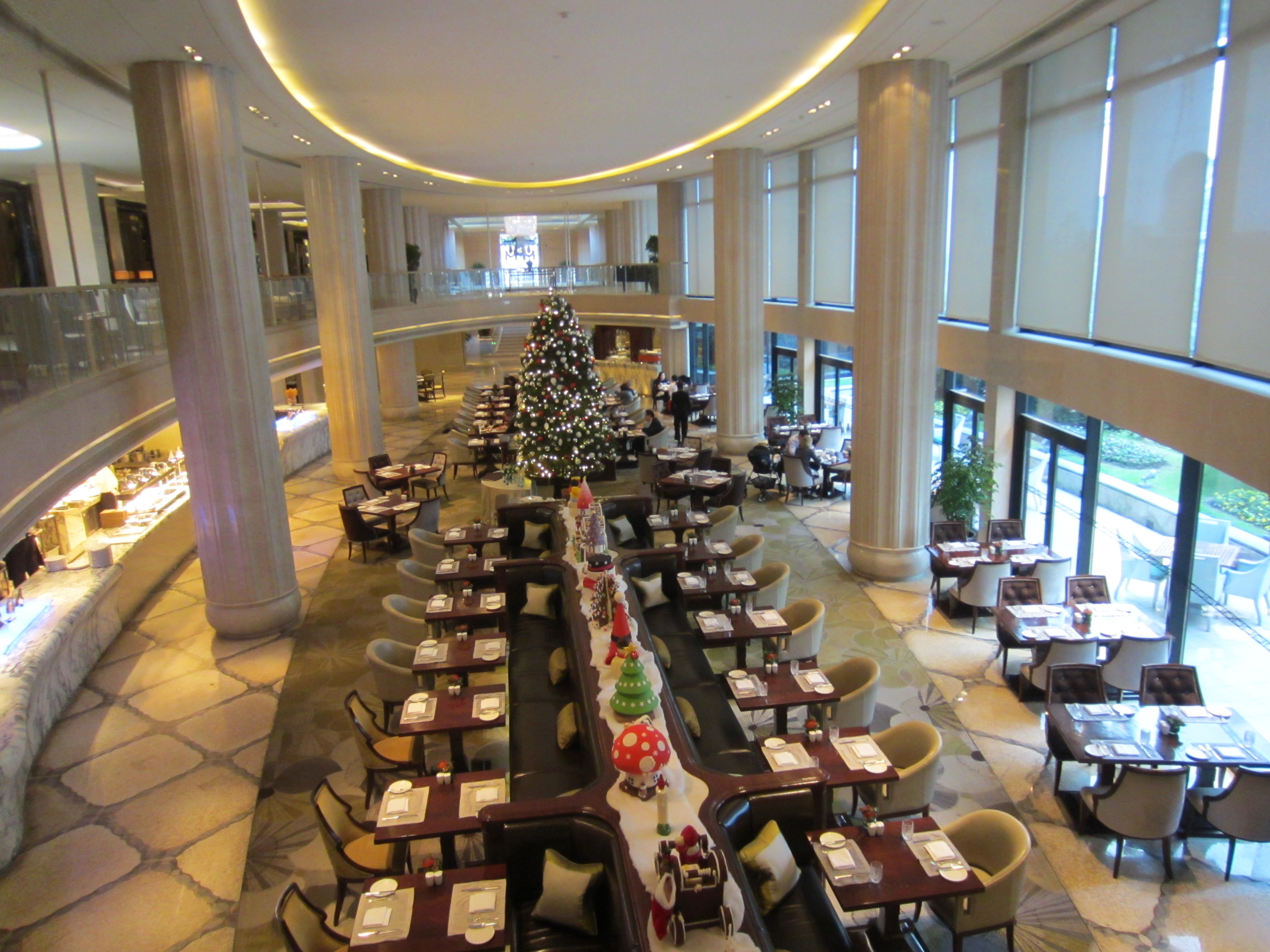
The hotel's Grand Brasserie restaurant
