= Shimoda Kikutaro =

Japanese architect

Kikutarō Shimoda
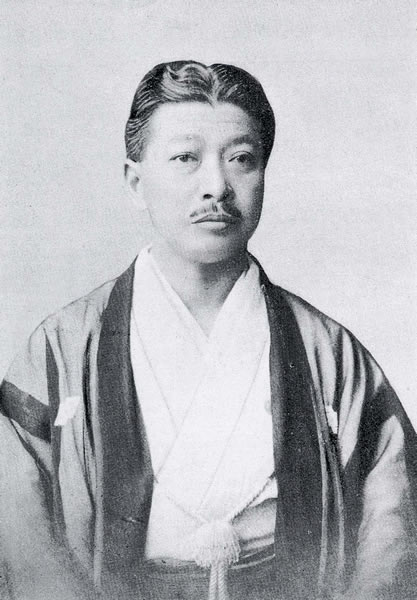
- Shimoda Kikutarō
- Born: June 14, 1866; Akita Prefecture
- Died: December 26, 1931 (aged 65)
- Other name: George Shimoda
- Education: Imperial College of Engineering (incomplete)
- Occupation: Architect
- Practice: A. Page Brown; D. H. Burnham & Company; Offices of G.K. Shimoda (Chicago); Shimoda Chikusō Gōshi Kaisha
- Buildings: Hong Kong Shanghai Bank Nagasaki, Japan; Tor Hotel, Kobe; Shanghai Club Building (Interior)
- Design: Imperial Crown Amalgamate Style

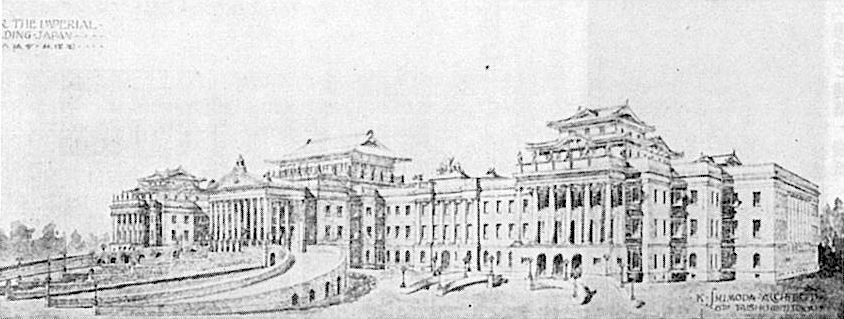
The illustration of Imperial Crown Style that Shimoda Kikutaro presented to the Imperial Diet

Shimoda Kikutarō (Japanese: 下田 菊太郎; 2 May 1866 – 26 December 1931) was an architect who created the prototype of the Imperial Crown Style for the Empire of Japan. He was a native of Akita, in northern Honshu, and moved to Tokyo in 1881, when he was fifteen. At Keio University, he enrolled in an architecture course under Josiah Conder.

== Early years ==
Kikutarō Shimoda was born in 1866, was the eldest son of Satake clansman, Junchū Shimoda, in Kakunodate, Akita (now part of Semboku, Akita, Japan. During his third year studies at Akita Junior High School (秋田中学校, Akita chū gakkō), he moved to Tokyo to take up language studies at Mita English Language School (三田英語学校, Mita eigo gakkō), after which in 1883 he took the entrance exams for the Imperial College of Engineering (工部大学校, Kōbu Daigakkō) (now part of the University of Tokyo). Out of the 1000 entrance exam participants, Shimoda passed the exams placed 47th out of the top fifty passing entrants.

== Tertiary education ==
In 1885 having passed the entrance exams, Shimoda enrolled in the School of Architecture at the Imperial College of Engineering, along with Tamisuke Yokogawa. Not satisfied with Tatsuno Kingo's lectures, who had recently returned from studying in the United Kingdom, Shimoda also took lectures from Hanroku Yamaguchi, who had been conducting lectures on French School architecture, which was not a mainstream architectural movement, at the Department of Education. During this time, Shimoda translated, European and American General Architecture, (Note: This is a back translation of Shimoda's Japanese title and may differ from the English original) and taught English at Seisoku English Language School (正則英語学校, Seisoku eigo gakkō) (present day, Seisoku Gakuen High School. In 1889 his father died suddenly, and Shimoda took out an Army scholarship-loan.

Shimoda gradually developed an inclination toward the theory of Evolution and the field of biology, and began to show disinterest in his college studies. Due to this, when graduation approached, Shimoda did not get along with his academic supervisor Tasuno Kingo, which became an obstacle to negotiating his final graduation design, (Note: In Japan most university courses require students to produce a final "capstone" piece of academic research such as a graduation thesis which may include and architectural design) in turn Shimoda did not complete his university studies. Out of Hanroku Yamaguchi's good will, who was then the head of the technical maintenance department at the Ministry of Education, allowed Shimoda to be employed at the Ministry. Shimoda published his translation of European and American General Architecture, which was an architectural review introducing residential housing. Together with the proceeds from this publication and his father's inheritance, he provided for his family, also raising capital for managing the architectural designs of Kinjyō School (Kinjō Gakkō) and private villas, he left for the United States.

== Career in America ==
Upon his arrival in America, he took up employment at the New York offices of A. Page Brown. In 1892 Shimoda submitted a personal entry in the architectural design competition for the California Pavilion at the 1893 World's Columbian Exposition, he lost to Brown, but moved to Chicago to take up a position as Construction Site Deputy Manager, improving his professional experience. While managing the California Pavilion construction site, Shimoda studied steel frame construction methods, under Daniel Burnham who was General Manager of site construction for the Exposition.

Wishing to further his study of steel-frame construction, he took up employment at D.H. Burnham & Company, which allowed him to work on steel-frame construction projects such as Reliance Building, Western Union Telegraphy Building, the Great Northern Hotel and Marshall Field department store. In May 1895, at the Illinois Cook County Court, Shimoda became a naturalized citizen of the United States, thereafter he left founded the offices of G.K. Shimoda located in the Monadnock Building on West Jackson Boulevard, Chicago. It was during the Autumn of 1896 that Shimoda married an American citizen named Rose, who was employed as Frank Lloyd Wright's secretary. (Note: Several sources state that Shimoda's wife name was Rose. One biographical novel published in Japanese names her Rose Campbell) During his time in Chicago, he had briefly worked under Frank Lloyd Wright.

In September 1897, Shimoda became the first Japanese national to pass the American Institute of Architects exam. (Note: AIA License No.471) Shimoda became well known among the Japanese expatriate community in Chicago, and received visits from Japanese nationals visiting the area. When he received a visit from Katayama Tōkuma, the chief engineer to the Imperial House of Japan for the construction of Akasaka Palace, Shimoda introduced him to Daniel Burnham. In 1909, for this service to the Imperial Household, Shimoda would receive a grace-and-favor payment of 500 yen in gold.

== Return to Japan ==
In 1898, he returned with his wife to Yokohama, where he involved himself in various controversies regarding prestigious buildings being planned in Japan. At first he opened an architectural office in Tokyo, and worked to popularize low cost steel frame construction methods, but met with opposition from Kingo Tatsuno, and in 1901 he moved to Yokohama to establish Shimoda & Co. Construction Company (下田築造合資会社, Shimoda Chikuzō Gōshi Kaisha), which specialized in architectural and building services exclusive to the foreign expatriate community.

In 1918, he strongly opposed the Westernised design of the planned Diet Building, and instead proposed a design in a style he called Teikan-heigo, or 'Imperial Crown Eclecticism'. This style combined a Western Neoclassical facade, with a roof style derived from those on Japanese temples and shrines. His proposal for the competition was rejected, so he submitted a design directly to the Diet. This was also rejected, and the competition was won by Fuzuko Watanabe. During this period, Shimoda was also involved in a dispute over claims about his design proposal for the Imperial Hotel, Tokyo, which was later formally awarded as a commission to Frank Lloyd Wright.

Notable works during this period included The Shanghai Club interior (c. 1910) in Shanghai; and the Hong Kong and Shanghai Bank, Nagasaki Branch (c. 1904).

== The Imperial Style prototype ==
Shimoda's development of the imperial style prototype for the Japanese empire evolved into two variations. The 'Imperial Crown style' has a Beaux Arts style body, with a Japanese style roof; while the 'Asian Renaissance Style' has a modern style body, with a Japanese style roof. There are other differences in detailing which relate to layout and relative symmetry.

== Gallery ==
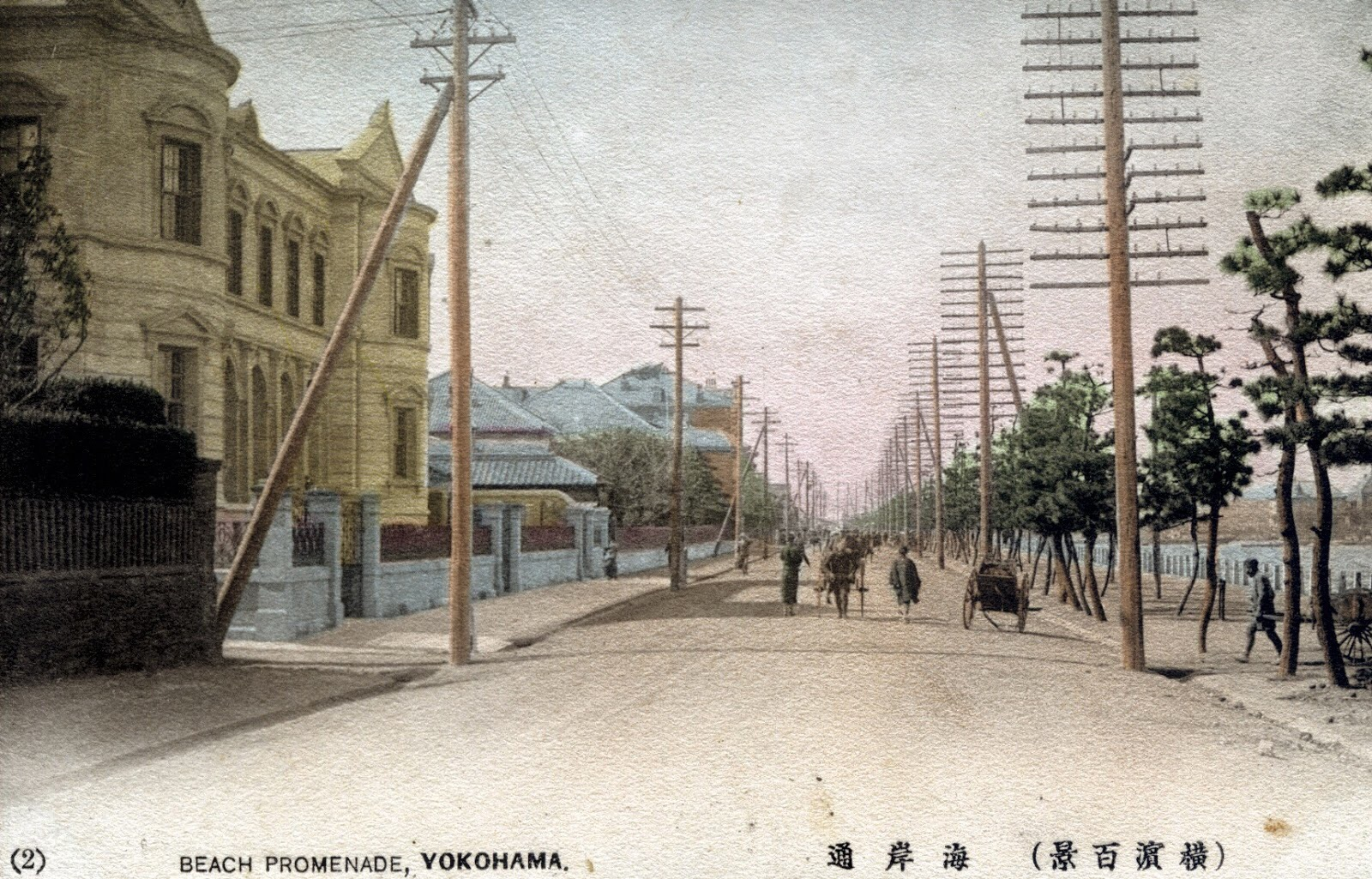
Photographic postcard of the New York Standard Oil Yokohama Branch (left), designed by Shimoda and completed in 1904

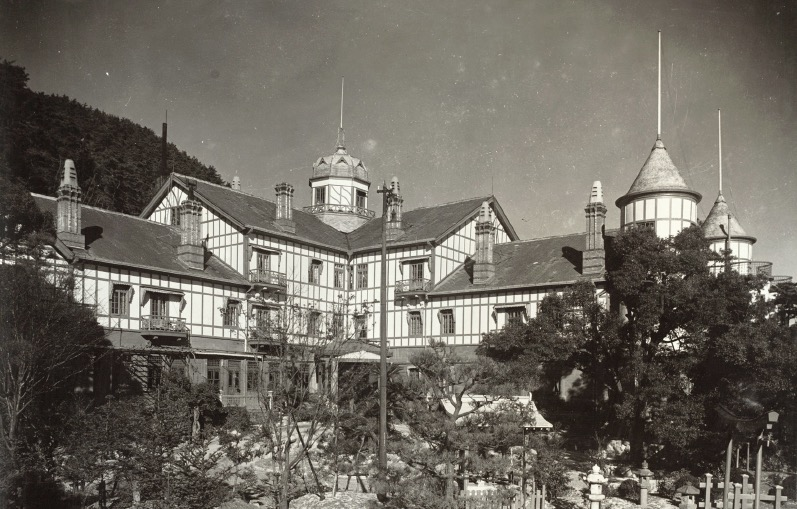
Tor Hotel in Kobe, Japan (1939), photographed by Iwata Nakayama.

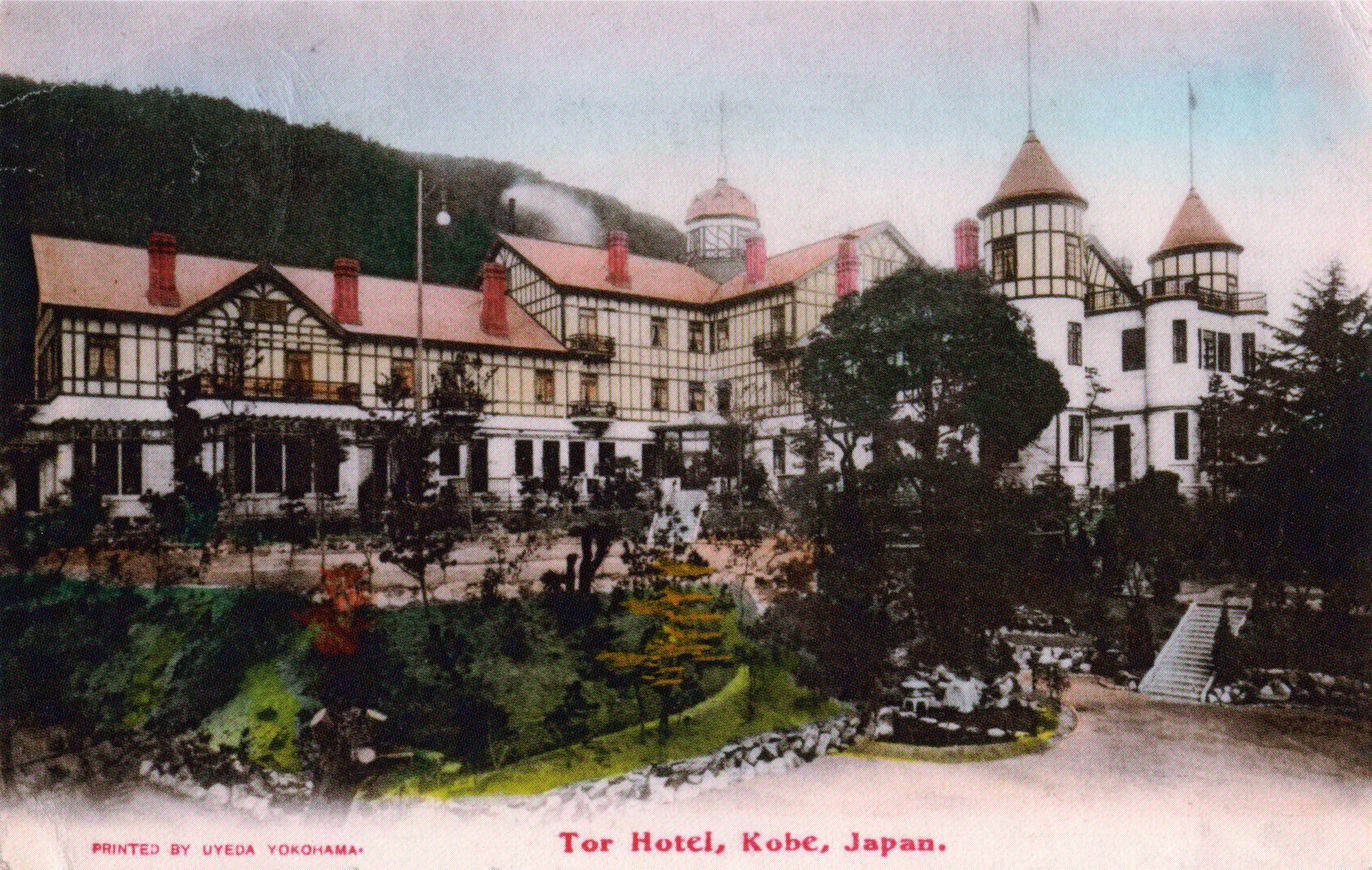
Tor Hotel in Kobe, Japan.

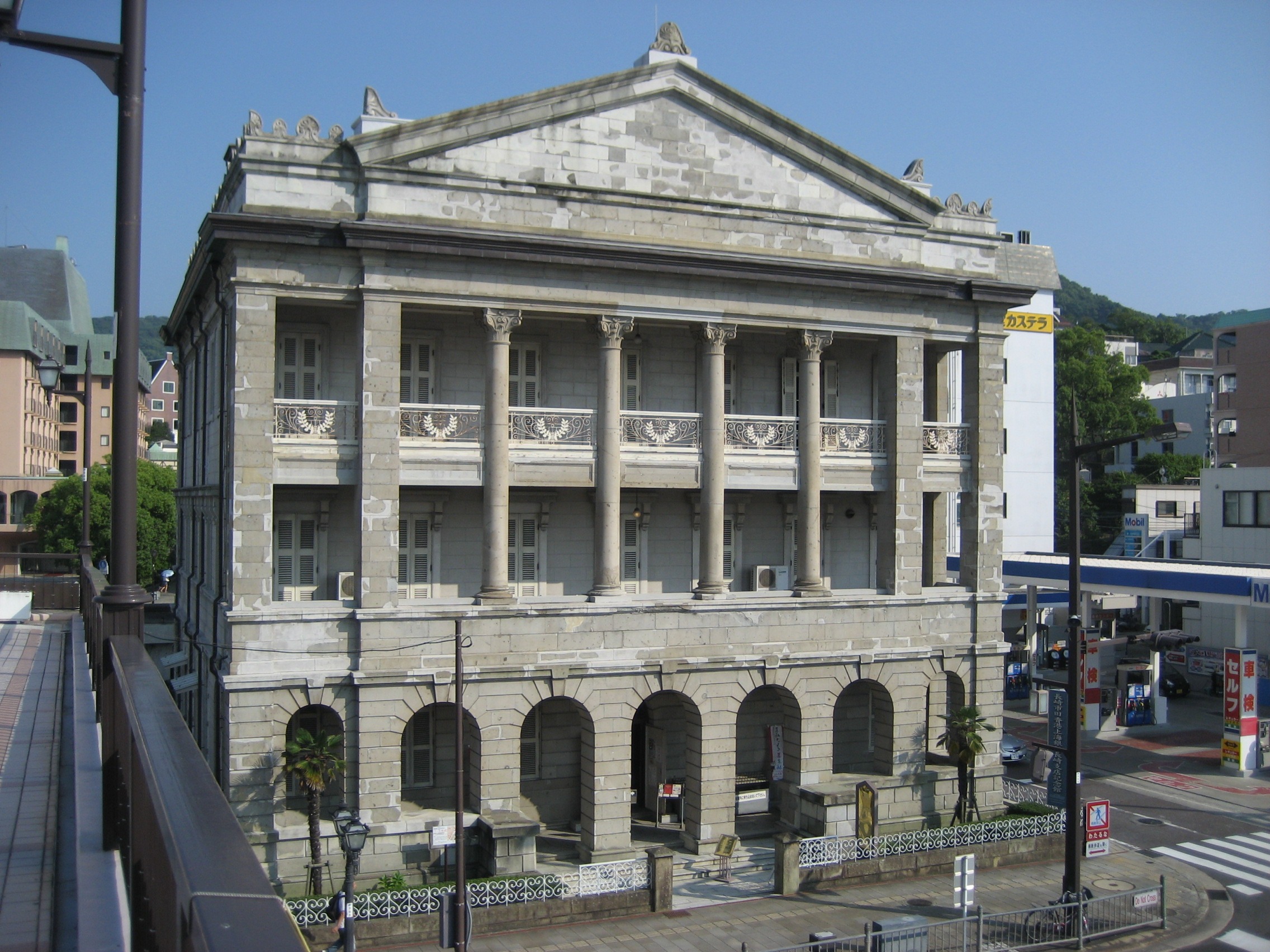
Hong Kong & Shanghai Bank in Nagasaki, Japan.

== Notable works ==
- Shanghai Club – interior (c.1910)
- Hong Kong and Shanghai Bank, Nagasaki Branch (c.1904)
- Tor Hotel (c.1908, demolished in 1950)
- Yokohama Yamatecho US Navy Hospital (c.1908)
- Commissioned the steel structure of the East Palace
- Shanghai General Assembly interior design (c.1912) – now Dongfeng Hotel

== Publications ==
Ideal Architecture (Japanese title: Shiso to Kenchiku), Shimoda Kikutaro – Printed in Tokyo by Seijosha. Published in 1928.
