= ASGC Construction =

Construction conglomerate company

- Company type: Private
- Founded: 1989; 37 years ago
- Headquarters: Bay Square, Business Bay, Dubai, United Arab Emirates
- Key people: Mohamed Saif Bin Shafar chairman
- Industry: Conglomerate
- Website: www.asgcgroup.com
- Current status: Active

ASGC (Al Shafar General Contracting Co. LLC) Construction is a construction conglomerate company established in 1989, headquartered in Dubai, UAE. ASGC is one of 26 companies in the Al Shafar Group. In 2020, the company had annual revenues of $1bn and 17,000 employees. It is privately owned by Mohamed Saif Bin Shafar (chairman), Emad Azmy (vice-chairman) and Mohammed Al Sayyah (non-executive director).

== History ==
The business was established in 1989 by a Dubai national and an Egyptian engineer.

In 2005, projects constructed by ASGC include Dubai's Ministry of Public Works building, the Dubai Police headquarters, Sector 6 of Jumeirah Beach Residence, Al Shatha Tower, and the 67-floor Mohammad Saif Al Shafar residential tower. In 2010, it reported project wins in Abu Dhabi, Dubai and Egypt worth around AED3 billion.

In 2015, it delayed plans for an initial public offering of its shares. Its completed projects then included the Waldorf Astoria on Palm Jumeirah.

In 2016, ASGC, in a joint venture with Kier, was awarded the Bluewaters Island project by Meraas to build more than 700 apartments. In 2019, it was appointed by Meraas to build a cruise liner terminal nearby, between Palm Jumeira and Bluewaters Island.

Also in 2016, ASGC started construction of Dubai's $245m (AED900m) Mohammed Bin Rashid Library, reputedly the largest cultural and library project in the Arab world, and won contracts to upgrade concourses at Dubai International Airport.

In May 2020, it became the largest shareholder (with a 15% shareholding) in the United Kingdom's Costain Group, as part of Costain's £100 million cash-raising share issue. In September 2024, ASGC sold its shareholding in Costain to institutional investors for £38m.

In 2020, ASGC contributed to Dubai's efforts to combat the COVID-19 pandemic, during which it was forced to cut around 15% of its workforce (almost 2,300 employees). In Egypt, the firm donated EGP5m to a COVID-19 fund to support seasonal workers. ASGC had initially acquired a 15% stake in the UK-based Costain Group during a £100 million capital raise in May 2020. However, in September 2024, ASGC sold its shareholding back to institutional investors for approximately £38 million.
