= Waldorf Astoria Dubai Palm Jumeirah =

5-star hotel in Dubai

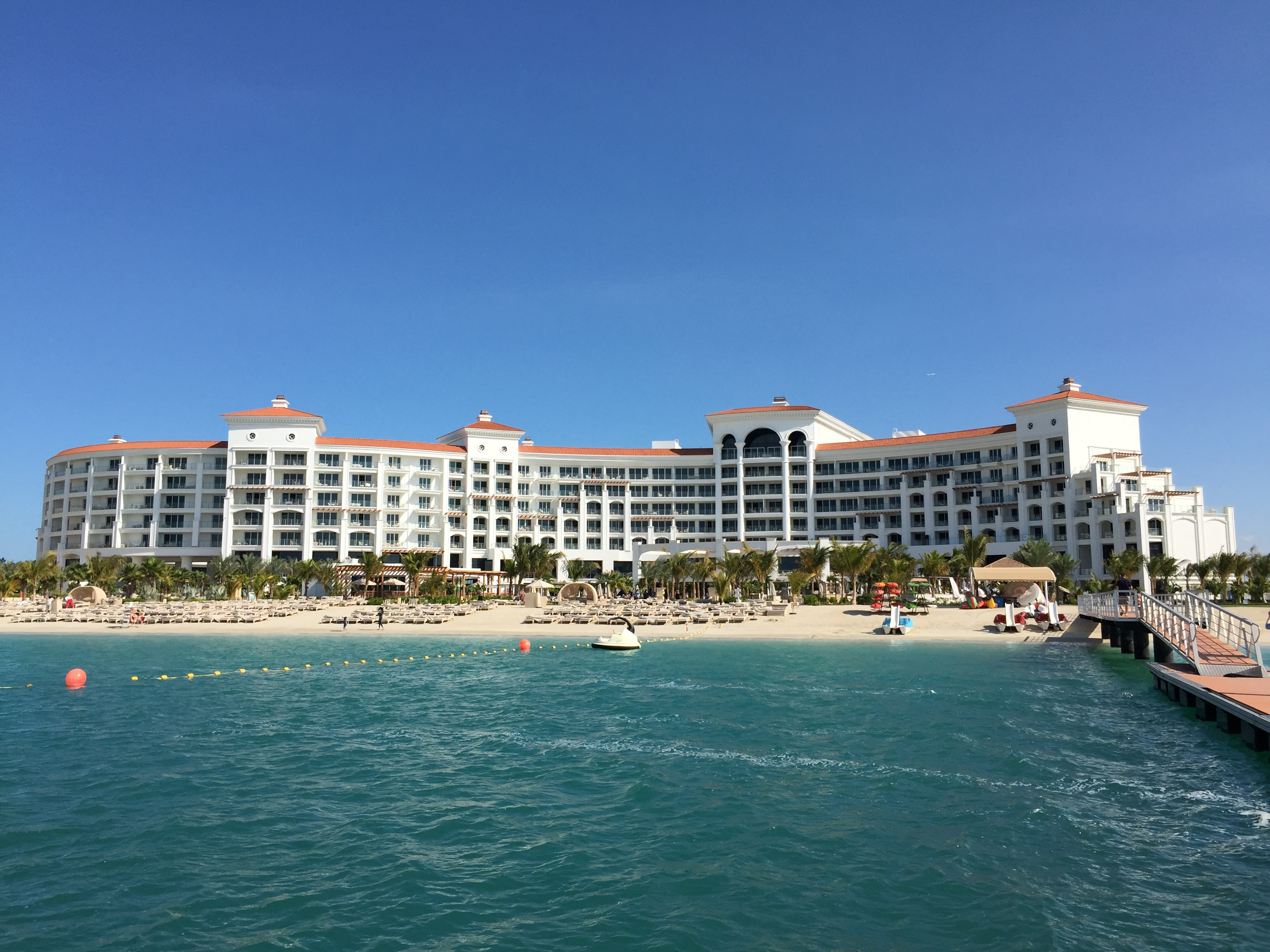

- Location within Dubai
- Hotel chain: Waldorf Astoria

General information
- Type: Luxury hotel
- Location: Crescent Road, The Palm Jumeirah, Dubai, United Arab Emirates
- Coordinates: 25.134618°N 55.150687°E
- Opened: 12 March 2014
- Owner: Al Habtoor Group
- Operator: Hilton Worldwide

Design and construction
- Architects: Khatib & Alami
- Main contractor: Al Shafar General Contracting (ASGC)

Other information
- Number of rooms: 319

Website
- Official website

Waldorf Astoria Dubai Palm Jumeirah is a five-star luxury hotel in Dubai, part of Hilton Worldwide. The hotel was opened March 12, 2014. It is the second hotel of the Waldorf Astoria Hotels & Resorts in the United Arab Emirates. In 2018, Corah Caples was appointed as Director of Operations.

== Building ==
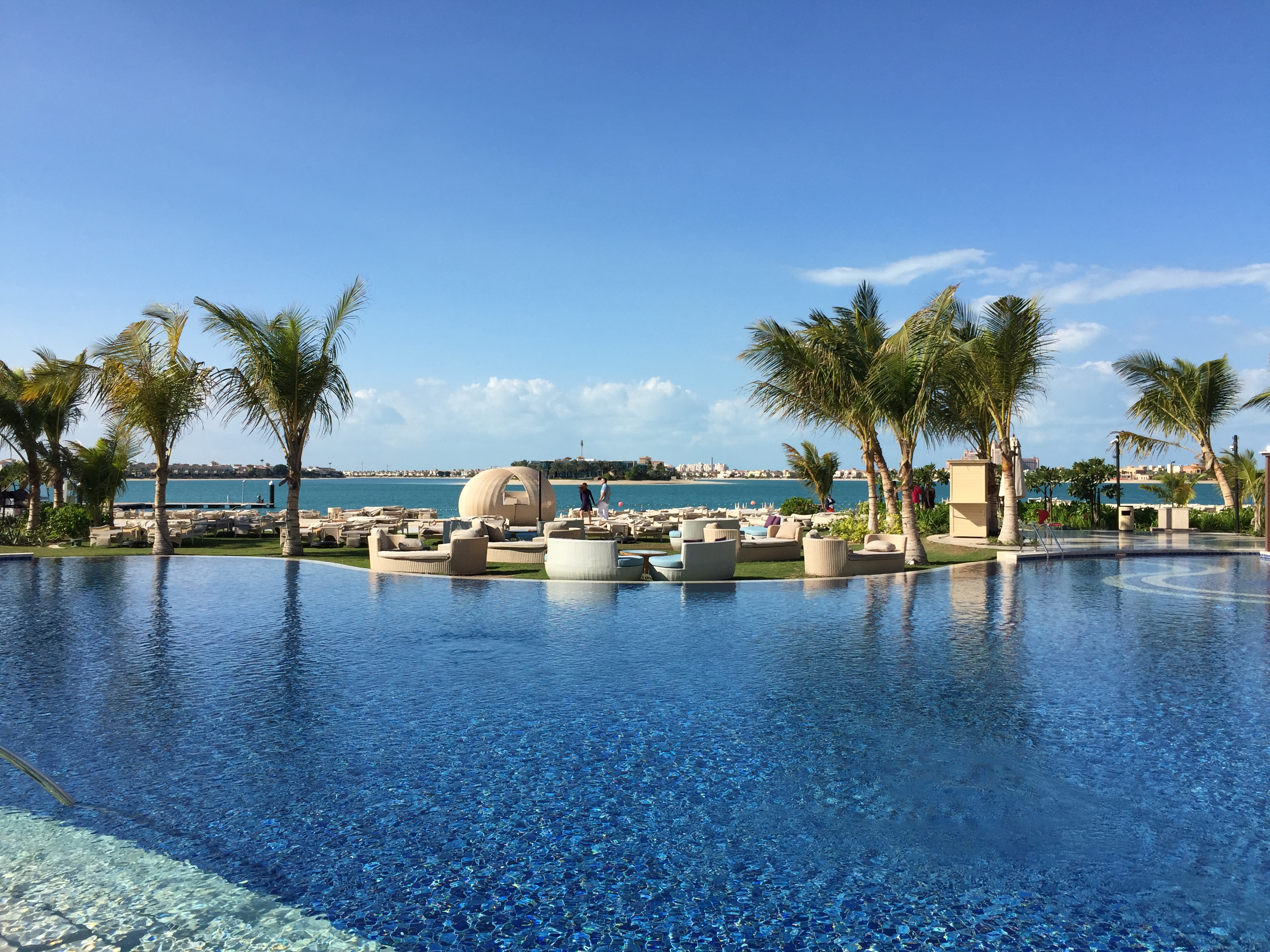
Waldorf Astoria Dubai Palm Jumeirah

The hotel is located on the Palm Jumeirah, an artificial archipelago in the United Arab Emirates. The hotel was built by ASGC Construction. Construction of the hotel faced a variety of issues during construction such as the site’s de-watering. Given that there were no closed shores near the site along with water having the ability to come in from multiple locations, the company had to adopt a variety of de-watering methods. A separate construction challenge came with the foundation work, as the diameter of the piles used was greater than those in the original designs as a result of changes to the building requirements. Foundations, therefore, had to be tailored according to existing pile locations. The plot is 49,000 m^{2} (530,000 sq ft) and the building occupies 20,000 m^{2} (220,000 sq ft) and consists of six above ground floors along with two basement floors.

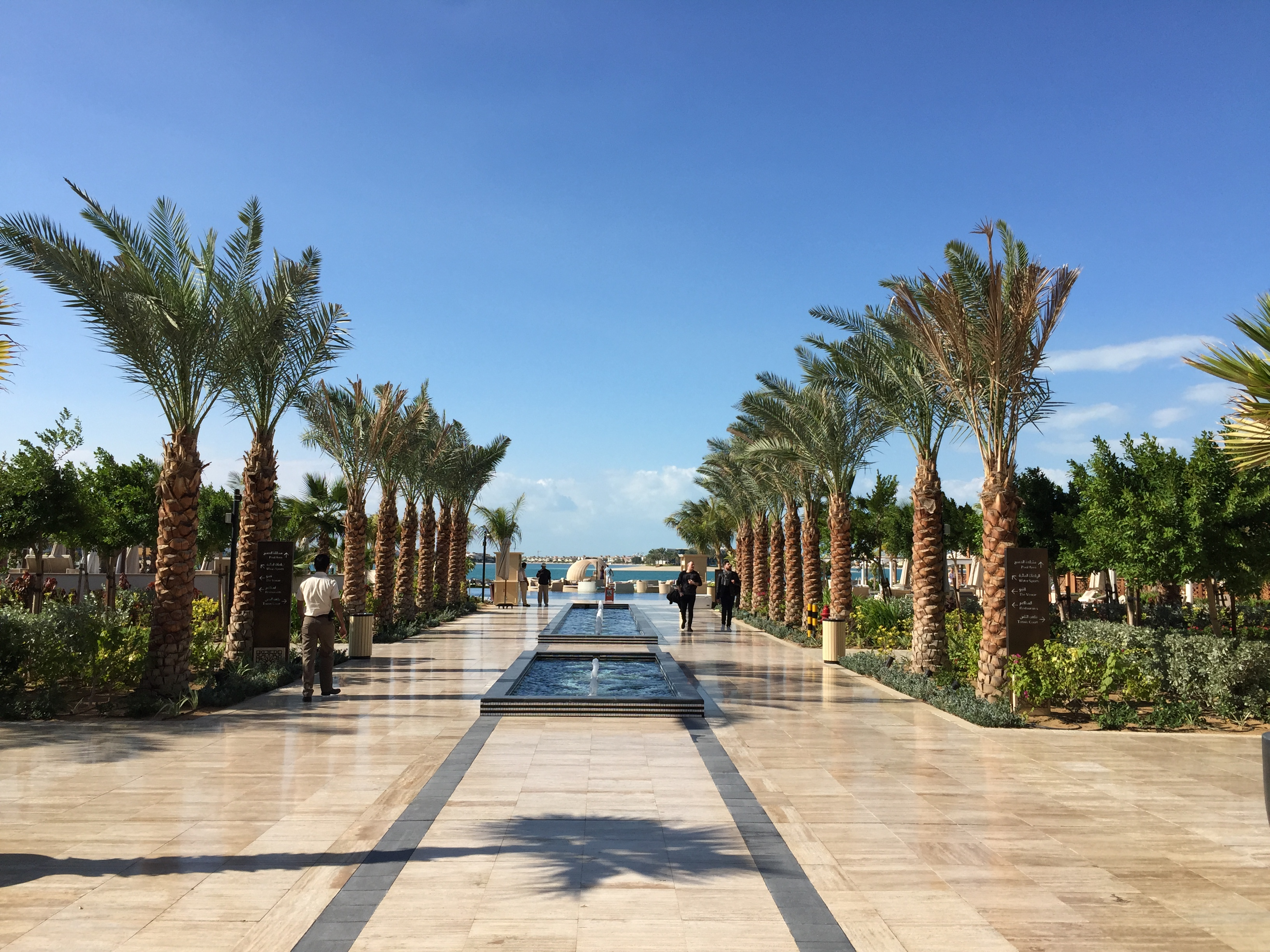

== See also ==
- List of hotels in Dubai
