= Waldorf Astoria Hotels & Resorts =

Luxury hotel chain

- Type: Subsidiary
- Industry: Hospitality
- Founded: January 2006; 20 years ago
- Number of locations: 39 (2025)
- Services: Luxury hotels and resorts
- Owner: Hilton Worldwide
- Website: Official website

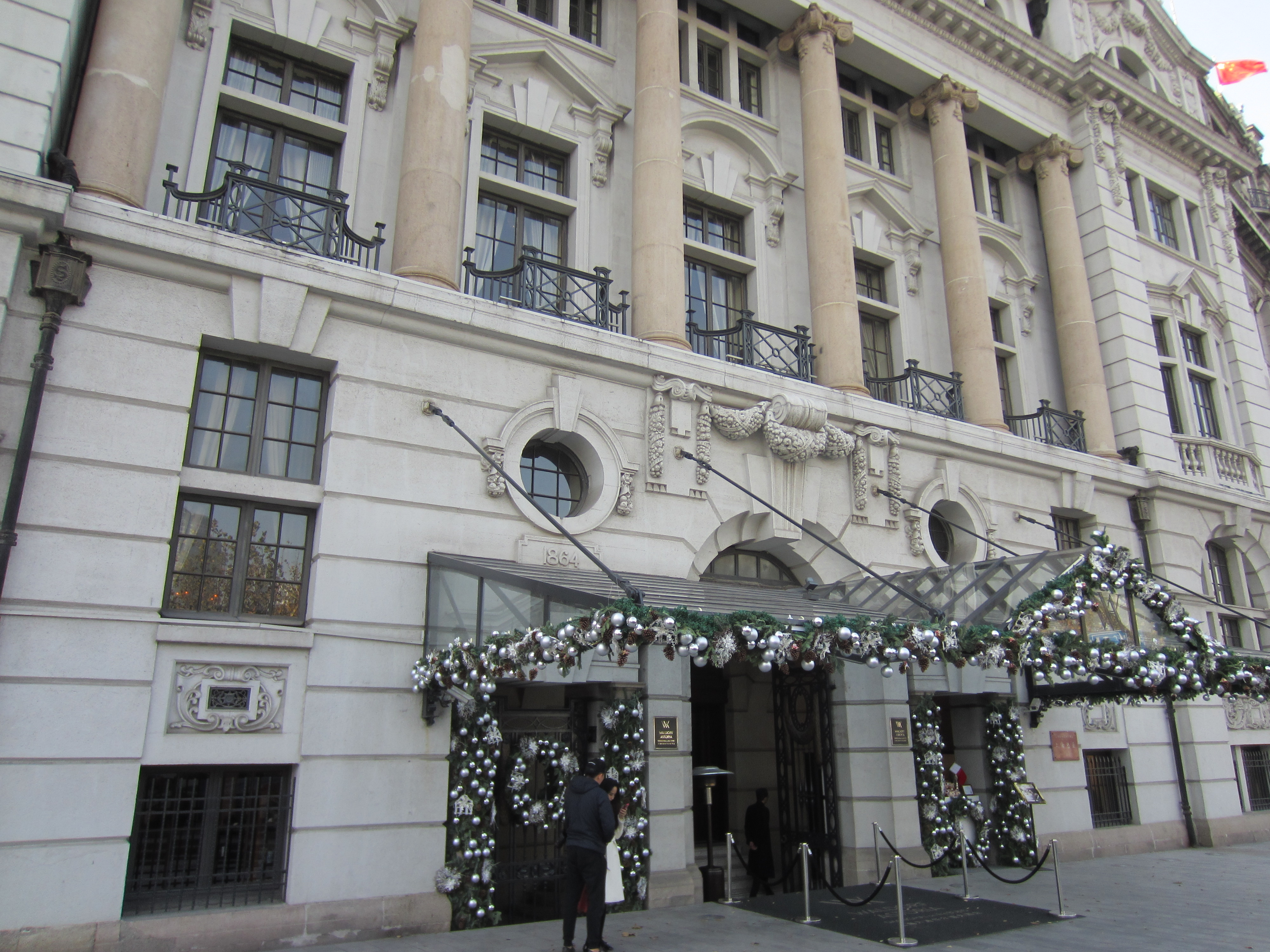
Waldorf Astoria Shanghai on the Bund

Waldorf Astoria Hotels & Resorts, formerly The Waldorf-Astoria Collection, is a luxury hotel and resort brand of Hilton Worldwide. It is positioned as the flagship brand within Hilton's portfolio, being used on hotels which offer the highest standards of facilities and service. As of December 2025, it had 39 properties with 9,688 rooms in 21 countries and territories.

== History ==
In January 2006, Hilton Hotels Corporation announced that it would launch a luxury hotel chain called The Waldorf Astoria Collection, branded after its flagship Waldorf Astoria hotel in New York City. In July 2009, the Dakota Mountain Lodge opened in Park City, Utah; it later dropped the "Dakota Mountain Lodge" title and is now known simply as Waldorf Astoria Park City. Waldorf Astoria Park City was acquired in September 2022 by Wolfgramm Capital, a private equity real estate firm. The Hilton group operates the hotel under a management contract with the buyer. It is the first ski resort to join the portfolio.

In January 2014, the Waldorf Astoria Dubai Palm Jumeirah opened in Dubai, on the Palm Jumeirah. In October 2014, Hilton Worldwide announced the sale of the Waldorf Astoria New York hotel to Chinese firm Anbang Insurance Group for $1.95 billion. The Hilton group continues to operate the hotel under a 100-year management contract with the buyer.

In March 2024, Hilton announced its expansion of the Waldorf Astoria brand into branded residences, with the first standalone residence project outside the US planned for Downtown Dubai, aiming for a 2028 opening in collaboration with NABNI Developments and designs by Carlos Ott Architects and Hirsch Bedner Associates.

== Accommodations ==
		U.S.	Americas (excl. U.S.)	Europe	Middle E. & Africa	Asia Pacific	Total
2013	Properties	14	2	4	3	1	24
2013	Rooms	7,292	1,232	1,042	703	260	10,529
2014	Properties	13	2	6	3	2	26
2014	Rooms	6,926	1,232	1,361	703	431	10,653
2015	Properties	12	2	6	3	2	25
2015	Rooms	6,671	1,137	1,361	703	431	10,303
2016	Properties	13	2	6	3	2	26
2016	Rooms	6,577	1,126	1,361	703	436	10,203
2017	Properties	13	2	6	3	3	27
2017	Rooms	5,666	1,126	1,361	703	723	9,579
2018	Properties	15	2	6	4	4	31
2018	Rooms	6,171	1,126	1,361	949	895	10,502
2019	Properties	14	2	6	5	5	32
2019	Rooms	5,965	257	1,361	1,224	1,014	9,821
2020	Properties	14	2	6	5	6	33
2020	Rooms	5,913	261	1,361	1,224	1,259	10,018
2021	Properties	12	2	6	5	6	31
2021	Rooms	4,535	261	1,361	1,224	1,259	8,640
2022	Properties	12	3	6	7	6	34
2022	Rooms	4,489	425	1,361	1,867	1,259	9,401
2023	Properties	12	3	6	8	6	35
2023	Rooms	4,598	422	1,361	2,200	1,259	9,840

== Properties ==
=== Current properties ===
The following table details the current properties of Waldorf Astoria Hotels & Resorts, in alphabetical order.

North America

North America
No.	Name	Location	Country/Territory	Opening Year
1	Grand Wailea, A Waldorf Astoria Resort	Wailea	United States	2006
2	Ho'olei at Grand Wailea	Wailea	United States	2008
3	The Roosevelt New Orleans, A Waldorf Astoria Hotel	New Orleans	United States	2009
4	Waldorf Astoria Atlanta Buckhead	Atlanta	United States	2018
5	Waldorf Astoria Beverly Hills	Beverly Hills	United States	2017
6	Waldorf Astoria Chicago	Chicago	United States	2012
7	Waldorf Astoria Las Vegas	Las Vegas	United States	2018
8	Waldorf Astoria Monarch Beach Resort & Club	Dana Point	United States	2021
9	Waldorf Astoria New York	New York City	United States	2006
10	Waldorf Astoria Orlando	Orlando	United States	2009
11	Waldorf Astoria Park City	Park City	United States	2009
12	Waldorf Astoria Washington DC	Washington, D.C.	United States	2022

Latin America and the Caribbean

Latin America and the Caribbean
No.	Name	Location	Country/Territory	Opening Year
1	Waldorf Astoria Costa Rica Punta Cacique	Guanacaste	Costa Rica	2025
2	Waldorf Astoria Los Cabos Pedregal	Cabo San Lucas	Mexico	2019
3	Waldorf Astoria Panama	Panama City	Panama	2013
4	Waldorf Astoria Riviera Maya	Cancún	Mexico	2022

Europe

Europe
No.	Name	Location	Country/Territory	Opening Year
1	Rome Cavalieri, A Waldorf Astoria Hotel	Rome	Italy	2008
2	Waldorf Astoria Amsterdam	Amsterdam	Netherlands	2014
3	Waldorf Astoria Berlin	Berlin	Germany	2013
4	Waldorf Astoria Helsinki	Helsinki	Finland	2025
5	Waldorf Astoria Minsk	Minsk	Belarus	2026
6	Waldorf Astoria Versailles - Trianon Palace	Versailles	France	2009

Africa and the Middle East

Africa and the Middle East
No.	Name	Location	Country/Territory	Opening Year
1	Waldorf Astoria Cairo Heliopolis	Cairo	Egypt	2023
2	Waldorf Astoria Doha Lusail	Lusail	Qatar	2022
3	Waldorf Astoria Doha West Bay	West Bay	Qatar	2024
4	Waldorf Astoria Dubai International Financial Centre	DIFC	United Arab Emirates	2019
5	Waldorf Astoria Dubai Palm Jumeirah	Palm Jumeirah	United Arab Emirates	2014
6	Waldorf Astoria Jeddah - Qasr Al Sharq	Jeddah	Saudi Arabia	2006
7	Waldorf Astoria Jerusalem	Jerusalem	Israel	2014
8	Waldorf Astoria Kuwait	Kuwait City	Kuwait	2022
9	Waldorf Astoria Rabat Salé	Salé	Morocco	2026
10	Waldorf Astoria Ras Al Khaimah	Ras Al Khaimah	United Arab Emirates	2013
11	Waldorf Astoria Seychelles Platte Island	Île Platte	Seychelles	2024

Asia and Pacific

Asia and Pacific
No.	Name	Location	Country/Territory	Opening Year
1	Waldorf Astoria Bangkok	Bangkok	Thailand	2018
2	Waldorf Astoria Beijing	Beijing	China	2014
3	Waldorf Astoria Chengdu	Chengdu	China	2017
4	Waldorf Astoria Kuala Lumpur	Kuala Lumpur	Malaysia	2026
5	Waldorf Astoria Maldives Ithaafushi	Kaafu Atoll	Maldives	2019
6	Waldorf Astoria Osaka	Osaka	Japan	2025
7	Waldorf Astoria Shanghai on the Bund	The Bund	China	2011
8	Waldorf Astoria Shanghai Qiantan	Qiantan	China	2025
9	Waldorf Astoria Xiamen	Xiamen	China	2020

=== Future properties ===
The following table lists Waldorf Astoria Hotels & Resorts properties in development, in alphabetical order.

Properties in Development

Properties in Development
No.	Name	Location	Country/Territory	Projected Opening Year
1	Waldorf Astoria Abu Dhabi	Abu Dhabi	United Arab Emirates	TBA
2	Waldorf Astoria Al Madinah	Medina	Saudi Arabia	2028
3	Waldorf Astoria Bahrain Bay	Manama	Bahrain	2028
4	Waldorf Astoria Bali	Nusa Dua	Indonesia	2029
5	Waldorf Astoria Diriyah	Riyadh	Saudi Arabia	2028
6	Waldorf Astoria Goa	South Goa	India	2030
7	Waldorf Astoria Guangzhou	Guangzhou	China	TBA
8	Waldorf Astoria Hanoi	Hanoi	Vietnam	2027
9	Waldorf Astoria Jaipur	Jaipur	India	2030
10	Waldorf Astoria Jakarta	Jakarta	Indonesia	2027
11	Waldorf Astoria Lake Tahoe	Lake Tahoe	United States	2027
12	Waldorf Astoria London Admiralty Arch	London	United Kingdom	2027
13	Waldorf Astoria Marbella	Marbella	Spain	2029
14	Waldorf Astoria Miami	Miami	United States	2028
15	Waldorf Astoria Miami Beach	Miami Beach	United States	2027
16	Waldorf Astoria Muscat Al Husn	Muscat	Oman	2027
17	Waldorf Astoria New Delhi	New Delhi	India	TBA
18	Waldorf Astoria San Miguel de Allende	San Miguel de Allende	Mexico	2027
19	Waldorf Astoria Scarlet Bay	Peloponnese	Greece	2029
20	Waldorf Astoria Shenzhen	Shenzhen	China	2028
21	Waldorf Astoria Sydney	Sydney	Australia	2027
22	Waldorf Astoria Tanger	Tangier	Morocco	2028
23	Waldorf Astoria Texas Hill Country	Fredericksburg	United States	2027
24	Waldorf Astoria The Avenues – Riyadh	Riyadh	Saudi Arabia	TBA
25	Waldorf Astoria Tokyo Nihonbashi	Tokyo	Japan	2027
26	Waldorf Astoria Turks and Caicos Dellis Cay	Dellis Cay	(United Kingdom) Turks and Caicos	2028
