= Shanghai Club Building =

Six-storey building in Huangpu, Shanghai, China

Coordinates: 31°14′20″N 121°29′0″E

- 上海总会大楼

General information
- Architectural style: Baroque Revival
- Location: Shanghai, China
- Opened: January 1910

Technical details
- Floor area: 9,280

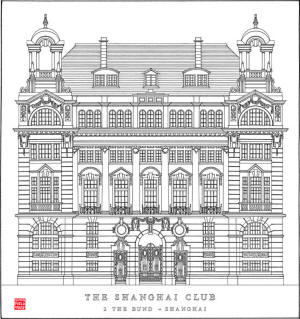
Shanghai Club - The Bund - Shanghai (Elevation)

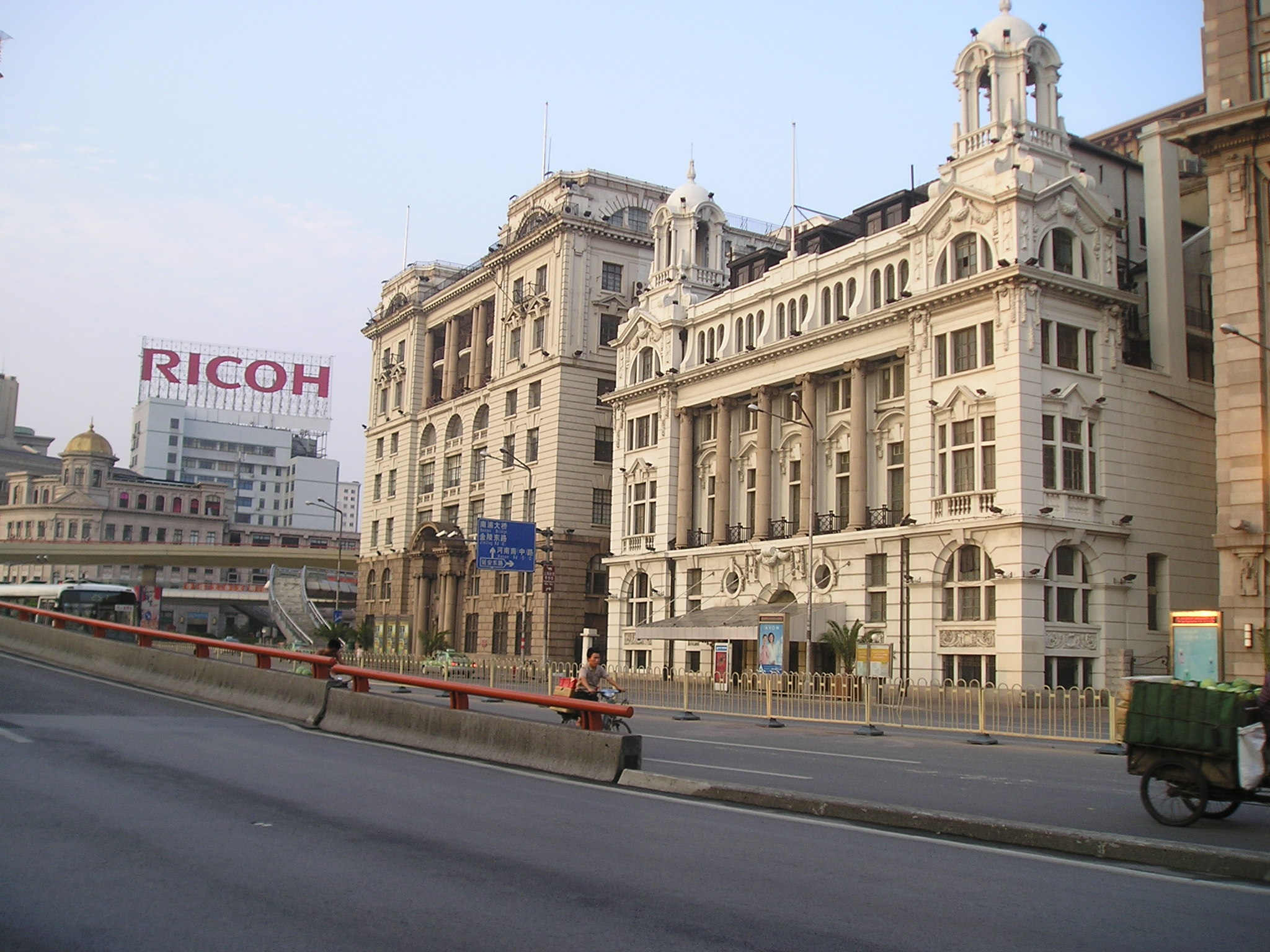
Shanghai club building on the right

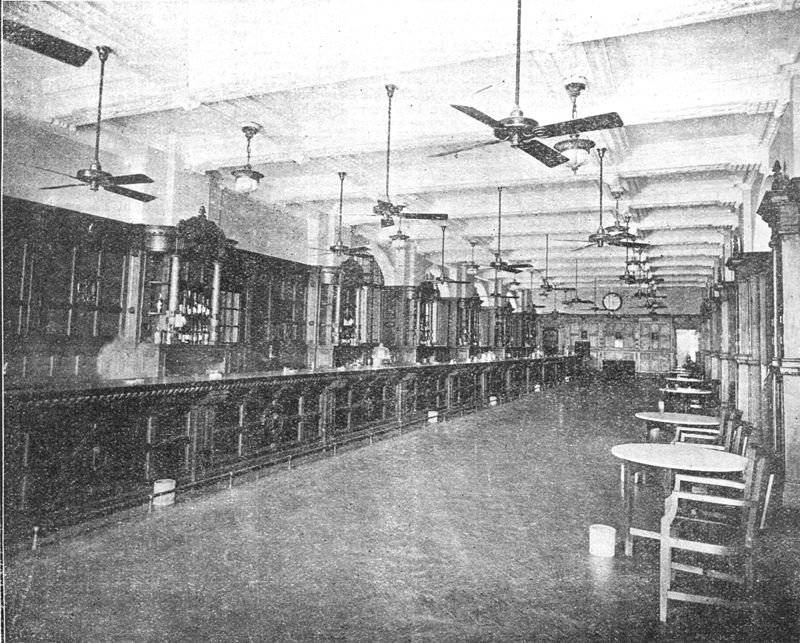
The Famous Long Bar in the Shanghai Club 1912

Shanghai Club Building (上海总会大楼) is a six-storey Baroque Revival building at The Bund, Huangpu, Shanghai, China. It was originally constructed in 1864 and opened in 1911, and was designated as a major cultural heritage site under national-level protection. Currently, it is operated by the Waldorf Astoria Shanghai on the Bund.

Once home to one of the premier men's clubs in Shanghai, the building was used for various clubs and hotels after 1949.

== Structure ==
The current building was opened on January 6, 1911. The total building footprint is 1,811 square metres, while total floor area is 9,280 square metres. The building's main facade, designed in the English Renaissance style, uses a tripartite design, the middle section featuring six Ionic columns. The roof section of the facade has two symmetrical Baroque-style cupolas, with intricate carved details. The architect was H. Tarrant. who died before its completion. A. G. Bray took over the design and is credited by at least one source as responsible for the interior design, Interior design is also claimed by Japanese architect Shimoda Kikutaro (下田菊太郎). The most famous feature of the interior is the 34-metre Jacobean-style mahogany bar, called "the long bar".

== History ==
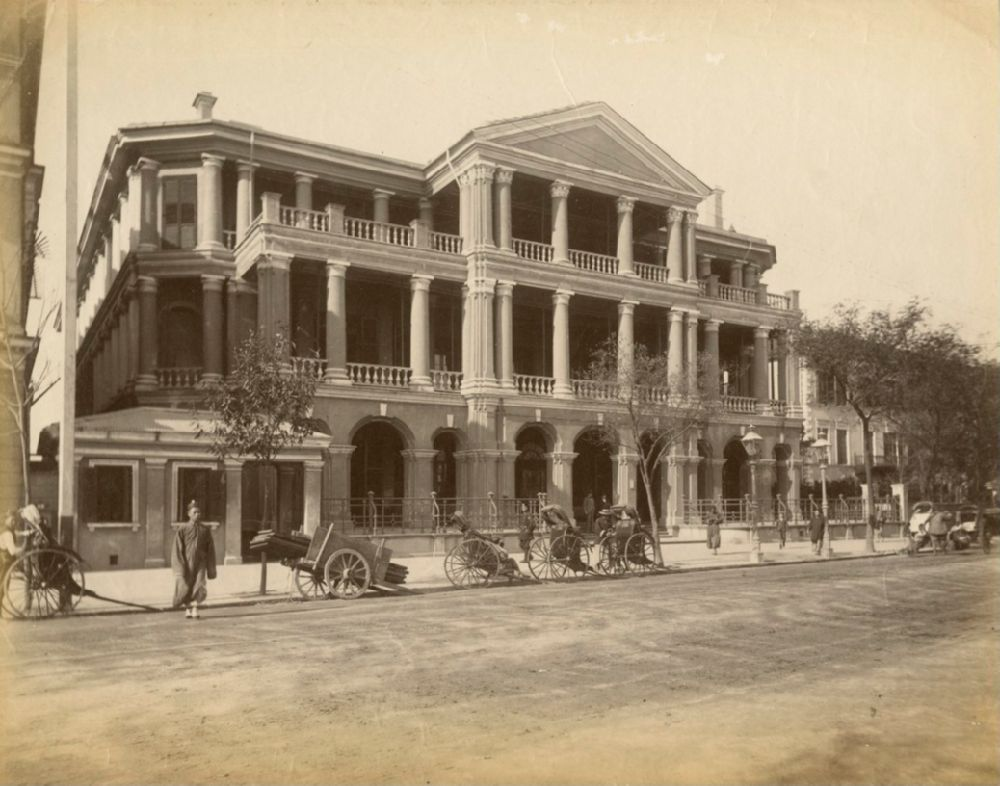
Undated photograph of the club building

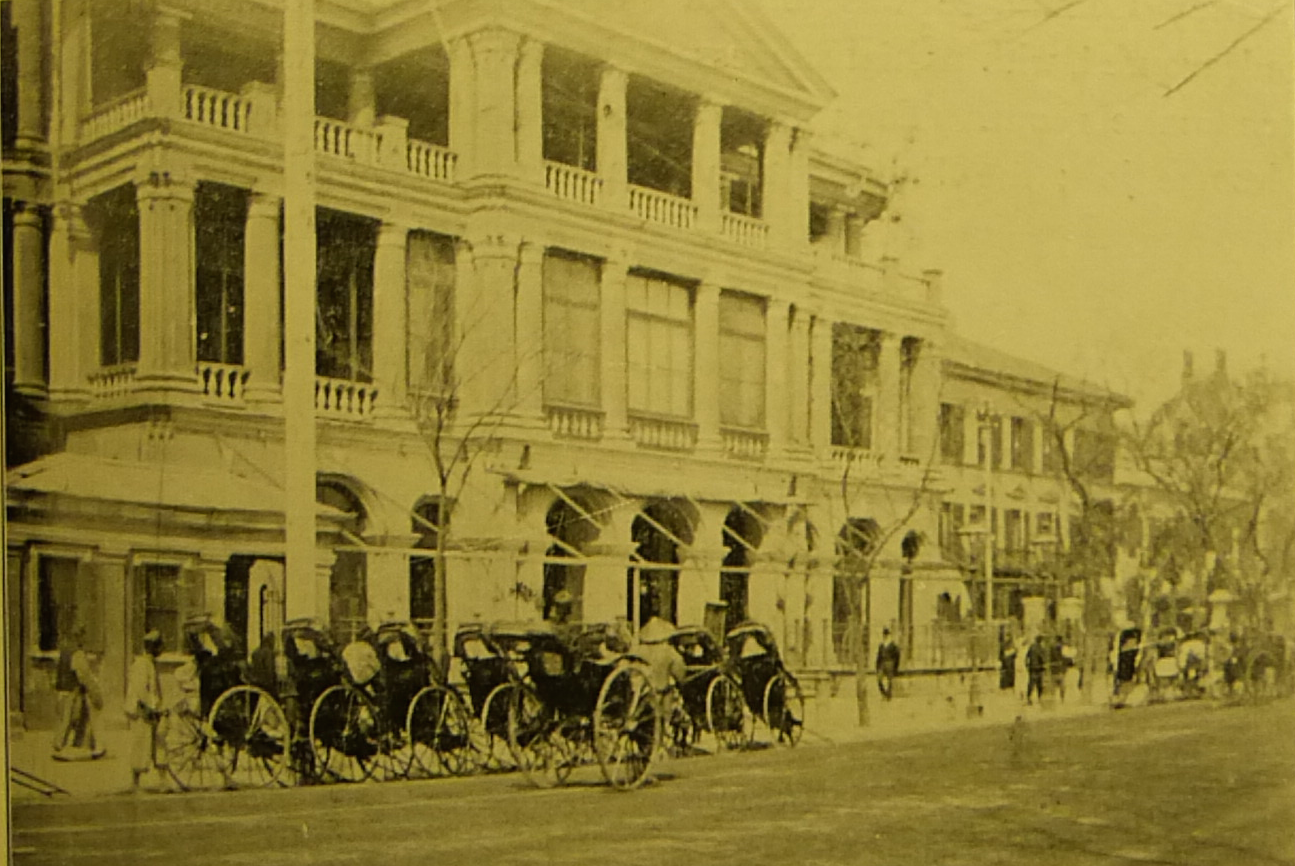
The Original Shanghai Club Building

The Shanghai Club was the principal men's club for British residents of Shanghai, which was founded in 1861. The club was originally named "The Correspondent's Club". In 1864, a club building was erected on this site, a three-storey red-brick building. Former United States President Ulysses S. Grant was hosted there when he visited Shanghai in 1879. In 1905, the Club decided to rebuild its club building. In 1909, the old building was torn down and replaced with a new, six-storey building, with a reinforced concrete structure in an English Renaissance style with Baroque Revival elements. The new building opened in January 1911. In its heyday in the 1920s and 1930s, the club was the most exclusive club in Shanghai and probably East Asia.

The second-floor was famous for the "Long Bar." This was an unpolished mahogany, L-shaped bar that measured 110.7 feet by 39 feet. It was famous for being the world's longest bar at one time. Noël Coward said, laying his cheek on it, that he could see the curvature of the Earth. There were also forty guest rooms on the second and third floors.

Membership was restricted to white men of a certain class. Even the famous 34-metre Long Bar on the second floor was subject to a strict hierarchy: the prime Bund-facing end of the L-shaped mahogany bar was the territory of the tai-pans and bank managers, with the social scale falling as one moved down the length of the bar. A massive Italianate Grand Hall was located on the first floor, with ceilings over 12 feet high, supported by enormous Ionic columns. The hall ended in a curving marble staircase, where twin elevators whisked members to the upper floors. Here, there were all the requisites of a proper gentleman's club: a smoking room and a library – reported to hold more volumes than the Shanghai Public Library – a billiards room, a dining room and guest rooms on the top two floors for resident members.

On the outbreak of war in the Pacific in 1941, the Shanghai Club was closed and occupied by the Japanese occupation force until the end of the war. In 1949, the building was expropriated by the new Communist government of Shanghai, and it was converted into the International Seamen Club, catering to foreign sailors. In 1971, it became the Dongfeng Hotel, and it was notable from 1990 to 1996 for hosting the first KFC restaurant in Shanghai.

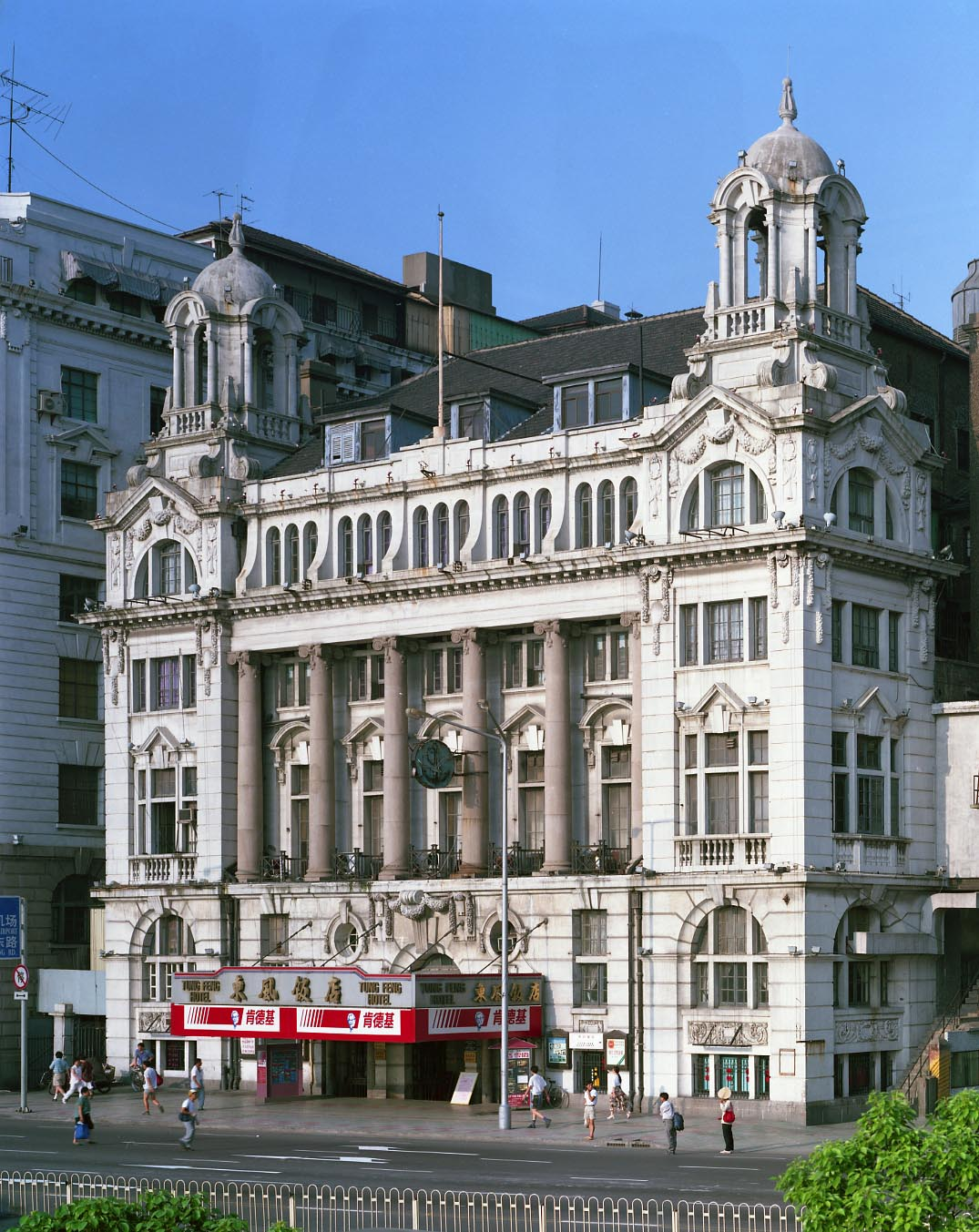
Tung Feng Hotel photographed in July 1994.

From 1996 the building sat derelict, until it was leased by the Hilton in 2009 and converted to become the Waldorf Astoria Shanghai on the Bund, a luxury hotel. The new hotel opened in 2011.

== See also ==
- Canidrome
